= Tihar =

Tihar may refer to:

- Tihar (festival), Nepalese festival
- Tihar Village, village in Delhi
- Tihar Jail, jail in Delhi
