= Black Warrant (disambiguation) =

Black Warrant may refer to:

- Black Warrant (book), a 2019 Indian book
- Black Warrant (film), a 2022 American film
- Black Warrant (TV series), a 2025 Indian television series, based on the 2019 book

== See also ==
- Execution warrant
