= DDPS =

DDPS may refer to:

- The Federal Department of Defence, Civil Protection and Sport in Switzerland
- Delhi Durga Puja Samiti, a Hindu festival in Delhi
- De Dietrich Process Systems, a company of the de Dietrich family
