= New Delhi Kali Bari =

Temple in India

Religion
- Affiliation: Hinduism
- District: Delhi
- Deity: Goddess Kali

Location
- Location: New Delhi
- State: Delhi
- Country: India
- Interactive map of New Delhi Kali Bari

New Delhi Kali Bari is a Hindu temple dedicated to Goddess Kali and the center for Bengali culture in New Delhi, India. Established in 1930s, it is situated on Mandir Marg, close to Laxminarayan Temple (Birla Mandir) in Delhi.

== History ==
After several years of demands by the burgeoning expatriate Bengali population, one acre of land was allotted on the new Mandir Marg (temple road), next to the Laxminarayan Temple. The small unpretentious temple of Goddess Kali came up shortly thereafter, with a pratima (idol) resembling the one at Kalighat Kali Temple in Kolkata. The mandir committee was formalized in 1935 with Subhas Chandra Bose as the first president and the first Mandir Building was inaugurated by Sir Justice Manmatha Nath Mukherjee. After that the authority established a building for the visitors and guest. Bengali tourists can book rooms or dormitory for staying there. There is an old and enriched library in Delhi Kalibari.

== Durga Puja ==
The Durga puja celebrated at the Kalibari, is one of the oldest Durga Pujas in the city. It first started in 1925. The original temple of Kali Bari was situated on Baird Road (today's Bangla Sahib Road), where the local Bengali community gathered for the annual Durga Puja. After the present temple came up after 1931, it shifted here. Till today, it continues to be the nodal point for the hundreds of puja committees in Delhi, and is widely revered among Delhi Bengalis. Only older pujas in Delhi are at Kashmere Gate, organized by Delhi Durga Puja Samiti, which started in 1910, and the Timarpur puja organised by the Timarpur and Civil Lines puja samiti, estd. 1914.

The puja celebration at Kali Bari continued to follow the traditional style, with traditional ekchalar thakur (single frame for idols) and sholar kaaj. Even puja rituals have remained unchanged since 1936 and traditional competitions in Rabindra sangeet and recitation are still organised. Mr Swapan Kumar Chakraborty is the current President of Delhi Kalibari. Artisans are brought in from Kolkata to build the puja pandal.

== Location ==
The temple is located on the Mandir Marg, situated west of Connaught Place in New Delhi. The temple is easily accessible from the city by local buses, taxis and auto-rickshaws. Nearest Delhi Metro station is R.K.Ashram Marg, located about 2 km away.
