= Sucharita Tyagi =

Indian film critic (born 1988)

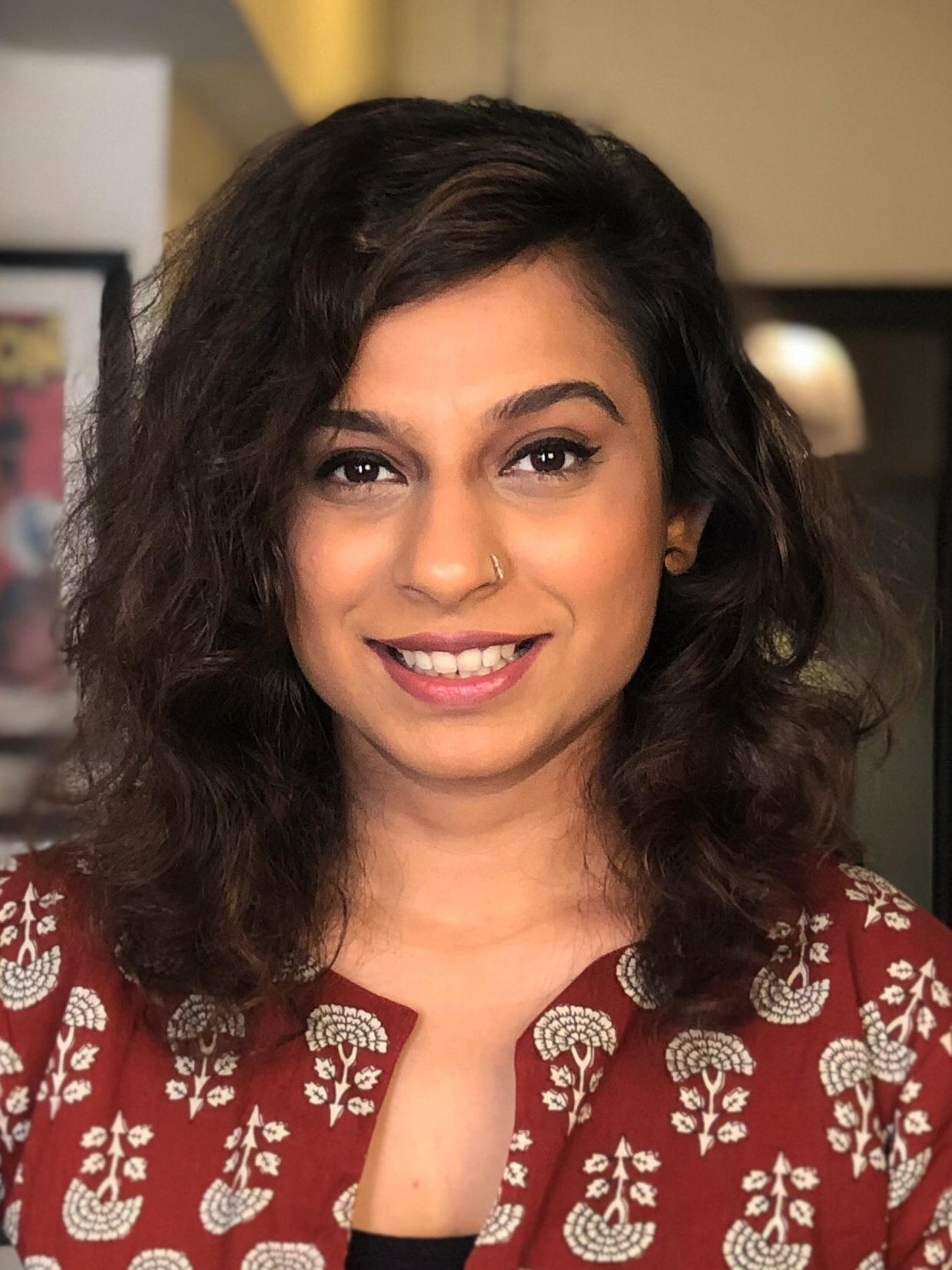
- Tyagi in 2019
- Born: 20 July 1988 (age 38); New Delhi, India
- Education: Indraprastha University, Delhi; St. Xavier's College, Mumbai
- Occupations: Film critic; video content creator

Sucharita Tyagi is an Indian film critic and former radio jockey. After working as a radio show host in New Delhi, she moved to Mumbai, transitioned into web content and launched her own YouTube channel where she posts film reviews and interviews with filmmakers, actors and other industry professionals.

Tyagi earlier recorded weekly review videos for Film Companion and hosted radio shows for channels including Red FM, Big FM and Radio City. Since launching her own YouTube channel, she has worked independently. Her channel has over 100k subscribers.

== Early life ==
Sucharita Tyagi was born in New Delhi, India. She attended Modern School, Barakhamba Road and graduated with a major in science.

== Career ==
=== Radio jockey (2007–14) ===
After graduating with a degree in Communications Studies and Journalism from the Indraprastha University, Tyagi began working as a voice over artist in New Delhi. At 19, she successfully auditioned for a job as a radio jockey at a Delhi-based FM channel. She worked at the Delhi stations of such channels as Red FM and Big FM, before moving to Mumbai, Maharashtra in 2010 to pursue post graduate education and further her career as a radio station host.

"I studied medicine till high school [but] shifted my talents to communications studies for a Bachelor’s Degree, and that is when I fell in love with broadcast media. I [...] started Radio two years after that, in 2007. Since then, it’s been a tumultuous way forward. I’ve worked with some of the top most Radio brands in India, and have loved every bit of it." - Tyagi, on choosing a career as a radio jockey.

Tyagi enrolled in a filmmaking course at the St. Xavier's College, Mumbai and simultaneously began working as programme host for the Mumbai-based FM station Radio City. She hosted the programme Freedom Live, which was aimed at promoting Indian independent music. The show was noted for its emphasis on lesser known artists and music.

She received attention for a starting a fundraiser to help Nikita Shukla—a visually impaired law student; the story was picked up by several media outlets. The campaign was widely shared and received attention from films actors and politicians based in Mumbai.

=== YouTube (2015–present) ===
Tyagi continued to work with Radio City until 2017, hosting Mumbai Masala; she interviewed various Bollywood and regional artists, then joined film review website Film Companion.

"When I mailed the first ever review to production, in the subject I wrote, "Not a Movie Review", and so we decided to call it that! [In my reviews], I simply say what a movie makes me feel, because that is how cinema should be appreciated." - Tyagi, on the title of her series and her style of writing film reviews.

Tyagi's first review video was released on Film Companion's YouTube channel in September 2015 under the title of "Not a Movie Review".

Tyagi was appointed a member of the Film Critics Guild, one of India's first film critics association as she continued to record weekly reviews for the "Not a Movie Review" series. She currently holds the position of Vice-Chairperson of the Guild. Some reviews received good amount of criticism, and sparked controversies and debates among artists and critics.

Tyagi made her film acting debut with a supporting role in the 2019 short film Lutf, co-starring Mona Singh and Vinay Pathak. A select few of episodes of "Not a Movie Review" were later compiled and released as a web series on Disney+ Hotstar under the same title in March 2020. Later that year, Tyagi played herself in Vikramaditya Motwane's black comedy, AK vs AK; also starring Anurag Kashyap and Anil Kapoor as fictionalised versions of themselves, the production utilises a film-within-a-film narrative. AK vs AK was released on Netflix on 20 December to positive response from critics.

In 2020, Tyagi launched her own clothing line in partnership with online retailer KadakMerch and started her own YouTube channel, posting weekly film reviews under the title "Ghar Se Movie Review". She also writes for other online media portals and publications. She was appointed as a jury member for the inaugural short film competition, the EUFF Film Project, at the European Union Film Festival in 2026.

== Filmography ==
Film
Year	Title	Role	Notes
2019	Lutf		Short film
2020	AK vs AK	Herself	

Television
Year	Title	Role	Notes
2020	Not a Movie Review	Herself	Web series; 63 episodes
