= The Silent Coup: A History of India's Deep State =

Book on Indian Politics

- Author: Josy Joseph
- Language: English
- Publisher: Context
- Publication date: August 23, 2021
- Publication place: India
- ISBN: 9-390-67953-2

The Silent Coup: A History of India's Deep State is a 2021 book by Josy Joseph, an Indian investigative journalist. In this book, Joseph presents the argument that India's democratic ethos has declined due to the extensive use of government agencies towards political ends. Joseph points out that, while the political class of India has kept military power in check, the non-military security establishment are used by the political executive to subvert democracy for their own ends, including silencing the government critics or intimidating them. The Deep State in the title of the book refers to this non-military security establishment, which includes the police, intelligence agencies, the Central Bureau of Investigation, the National Investigation Agency, the Anti-Terrorism Squad etc. and some others such as the Enforcement Directorate, the Income Tax Department, and so on.
