= Josy Joseph =

Indian writer and journalist

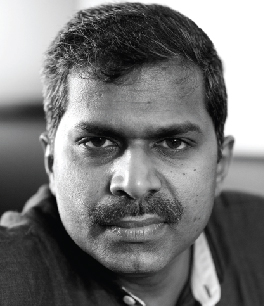
- Born: 6 May 1974 (age 52); Cherthala, Alapuzha District, Kerala, India
- Education: Fletcher School of Law and Diplomacy, Tufts University NSS College, Cherthala, University of Kerala, Sainik School Kazhakootam
- Occupation: Journalist
- Notable work: A Feast of Vultures: The Hidden Business of Democracy in India
- Spouse: Priya Solomon
- Children: Supriya Ann Joseph
- Website: http://josyjoseph.in

Josy Joseph is an Indian investigative journalist and author. He is the founder of Confluence Media, a platform-agnostic investigative journalism organization. He is an adjunt faculty at O. P. Jindal Global University

== Early life and education ==
He graduated from NSS College, Cherthala, affiliated to the University of Kerala, in Mathematics, Physics, and Statistics, and holds a Post-Graduate Diploma in Journalism. Joseph received his master's degree in International Relations in 2007 from the Global Master of Arts Program (GMAP) at The Fletcher School of Law and Diplomacy, Tufts University.

== Career ==
Joseph worked for The Hindu, Times of India, DNA (newspaper) and Rediff.com. His major works include news breaks on Leave Travel Allowance (LTA), published in Times of India in August 2013, on members of the Indian Parliament and government employees defrauding the government with false bills to claim undue benefits and on 2G spectrum case during 2010-11.

He reported on the questionable role of many sports administrators's in the 2010 Commonwealth Games. He also reported on the Adarsh Housing Society scandal which dealt with alleged irregularities in the construction of the Adarsh apartment complex in Mumbai meant for war widows and battle heroes. Joseph was part of the Times of India team that reported on BJP president Nitin Gadkari's Purti group receiving investments from over 100 companies, many of which were controlled by his close aides. Later, investigative agencies probed the group for money laundering and various criminal acts.

In July 2005, he reported on the alleged leakage of sensitive information from the War Room of the Government of India. It resulted in probes and consequent overhaul of security in military installations. In May 2003, he wrote for Rediff.com a five-part series on the long-term outlook for security issues in Pakistan. Joseph also interviewed Abdul Majid Dar, the chief commander of Hizbul Mujahideen, Kashmir's militant group.

In October 2016, Joseph and Vijaita Singh, published details of Operation Ginger that followed 2011 India–Pakistan border skirmish, one of the deadliest cross-border surgical strikes carried out in Pakistan by the Indian Army. In February 2018, Joseph and Khadija Sharife, in a joint investigation by The Hindu and the Organized Crime and Corruption Reporting Project (OCCRP), reported on India's state-owned Bank of Baroda's role in the financial machinations of South Africa's politically influential Gupta family, which led to the resignation of South African President Jacob Zuma.

== Books ==
In 2016, HarperCollins published his first book titled A Feast of Vultures: The Hidden Business of Democracy in India. The book was published Malayalam in 2021, translated by K.N. Ashok, a noted journalist and author.

The second book, The Silent Coup: A History of India’s Deep State was published in August 2021 by Context, an imprint of Westland Books. It deals with political corruption, money laundering, systemic issues within India’s security establishment and the alleged threats to democracy by India’s ruling elite." Business Standard found in the book multiple tales of how India’s security establishment and intelligence agencies have played an indelible role in weakening the democratic fabric of the country

== Confluence Media ==
In November 2019, Joseph received commitments for a seed-funding round from Accel founder Jim Swartz for his digital media startup, Confluence Media. Confluence Media bought the rights of the book 'Black Warrant: Confessions of a Tihar Jailer by Sunetra Choudhury and adapted it into a web series titled Black Warrant (TV series), co-created and co-directed by Vikramaditya Motwane

== Awards ==
2011: The Prem Bhatia Memorial Trust selected Josy Joseph for 'Outstanding Political Reporting of The Year for investigative reports, including the Adarsh scam, and corrupt decisions in organising the 2010 Commonwealth Games.'

2013: In July, he was also awarded the "Journalist of the Year (Print)" for 2010 at the Sixth Ramnath Goenka Excellence in Journalism Awards.

2018: Joseph's book A Feast of Vultures, was named the best book for 2017 by the jury in the non-fiction category of the Crossword Book Award.

2019: Recipient of India Press Club of North America's Madhyamasree Puraskaram.

== Controversies ==
In December 2016, Jet Airways and its founder-chairman Naresh Goyal filed a civil defamation suit seeking ₹1,000 crore in damages from Joseph, for references in the book A Feast of Vultures: The Hidden Business of Democracy in India alleging Goyal's connections with gangster Dawood Ibrahim
