= Geeta and Sanjay Chopra kidnapping case =

1978 crime in New Delhi, India

Geeta and Sanjay Chopra kidnapping
- Date: 26 August 1978
- Location: New Delhi, Delhi, India
- Outcome: Deaths of Sanjay and Geeta Chopra
- Deaths: 2
- Convicted: Kuljeet Singh (alias Ranga Khus); Jasbir Singh (alias Billa)
- Verdict: Guilty
- Convictions: Murder, common intention, kidnapping, kidnapping with unlawful confinement, kidnapping a woman with intention of sexual intercourse, and kidnapping with intention to cause hurt
- Sentence: Convicts hanged at Tihar Jail, New Delhi on 31 January 1982
- Awards: Victims awarded Kirti Chakra; Sanjay Chopra Award and Geeta Chopra Award instituted for bravery by children under the age of 16

The Geeta and Sanjay Chopra kidnapping case (also known as the Ranga-Billa case) was a kidnapping and murder in New Delhi in 1978. It involved the kidnapping and subsequent murder of siblings Geeta and Sanjay by Kuljeet Singh (alias Ranga Khus) and Jasbir Singh (alias Billa). Although the children were kidnapped for ransom, they were killed after the kidnappers learned that their father was a naval officer, on the assumption that he was not wealthy. Both men initially admitted to raping Geeta before her murder. They later retracted their statements, and forensic evidence could not confirm the rape. Upon circumstantial evidence including evidence that Geeta had been stripped naked, it was later confirmed beyond reasonable doubt that rape was committed. The two kidnappers were convicted and sentenced to death. The execution by hanging was carried out in 1982. Crime Patrol Dial 100 aired two episodes on Sony TV based on the story, 723 and 724, on 28 February 2018 and 1 March 2018. The case was also shown on the TV series Bhanwar, the 2025 Netflix series Black Warrant and the 2026 series Raakh, on Amazon Prime Video.

== Kidnapping ==
Geeta and Sanjay Chopra kidnapping case (Delhi)

Geeta Chopra was a 16½-year-old 2nd year student at Jesus and Mary College, New Delhi. Her brother, Sanjay, was a 14-year-old student in the 10th standard of the Modern School. Their father, Madan Mohan Chopra, was a captain in the Indian Navy. They lived in the Officer's Enclave in Dhaula Kuan.

On Saturday 26 August 1978, Geeta and Sanjay were supposed to participate in a radio programme called the Yuva Vani on All India Radio. They were to reach the All India Radio office on the Sansad Marg by 7 pm. Their father was supposed to pick them up outside the All India Radio after the programme at 9 pm.

The siblings left their house at 6:15 pm. A man, Kula Nand, saw them at the roundabout at Dhaula Kuan. Another person, M. S. Nanda, who was a witness in the case, gave the children a lift from Dhaula Kuan to Gole Dak Khana as it was drizzling.

At 6:30 pm, Bhagwan Dass noticed a mustard colour Fiat car, while travelling from Gurudwara Bangla Sahib towards North Avenue, near the yoga ashram at Gole Dak Khana. He heard noises coming from the car, so he stopped his scooter and approached the vehicle. He saw a girl pulling the hair of the driver and a boy fighting the passenger by the driver. Dass could not stop the car, and it sped away towards Willingdon Hospital. Several other people had tried to stop the car. One man named Babu Lal dropped his bicycle and tried to grab the door handle of the car, but failed. Dass reported this to the police. At 6:45 pm, he called the police control room and told them the license number of the car as HRK 8930, but it was noted by the operator as MRK 8930. Dass also reported that the girl was screaming for help.

Inderjeet Singh, a junior engineer in the Delhi Development Authority returning home from work on his scooter, saw the car on Baba Kharak Singh Marg near the casualty block of the Willingdon Hospital. He noticed a girl and a boy sitting in the rear, struggling with the driver and another man. He drove up and lined up with the running car. The boy, Sanjay, showed his bleeding shoulder to Inderjeet Singh and waved his hands at him, pleading for help. Inderjeet followed the car onto Shankar Road. But he lost the car when it jumped a red light at a traffic crossing at 6:45 pm. Inderjeet noted the correct number of the car and reported it to Rajendra Nagar. The police were slow in their reaction as they considered it a cognisable offence and that it was outside their jurisdiction, as they could not proceed without taking permission from the Meerut High Court.

At 8 pm, their parents tuned in to the radio to listen to their children on the programme, but another girl had been given the slot. The parents assumed that they had tuned in to the wrong station or that the programme had been cancelled. Their father took his scooter from home at 8:45 pm to reach the radio office. He did not find his children at the appointed place. He was told at the office that the children did not arrive. The father called home to ask if the children had reached home; their mother replied in the negative. Their father returned home and called his relatives and friends to ask if the children were with them.

At 10:15 pm, the kidnappers went to the Willingdon Hospital in a car with the number DHI 280, as one of them, Billa, had acquired a cut on his head. The hospital had taken a skiagraph of his skull. One of them left a fingerprint on the skiagraph, which matched perfectly with the culprit after he was apprehended. On being asked, they gave the doctors false names and said they were hurt by some thieves. The constable on duty at the hospital, Ranbir Singh, took their statement in which they said they were attacked near the Kali Mandir on Bangla Sahib road, their watch was stolen, and the injury was from an iron rod. Ranbir Singh informed the Mandir Marg police station. At 10:50 pm, two policemen dispatched from the Mandir Marg station to further question them arrived at the hospital.

At 11:10 pm, the two decided to leave against the doctors' advice. The two policemen, Sub-Inspector Ram Chander and Constable Harish Ram, asked them to accompany them to the spot where they were supposedly robbed. They took them to the spot in their car. Chander failed to find signs of struggle. They asked the duo to take them back to the station. At 1:45 am, they left the station, but they were asked to report again in the morning. When they did not, Chander went to their addresses, but found them to be false. Chander inquired with the Regional Transport Office and found the vehicle number belonged to a scooter.

== Investigation and media attention ==
The police control room forwarded the report from Dass to Mandir Marg police station. The report was given to sub-inspector Om Prakash at 7:05 pm. He went to the Gole Dak Khana to search for witnesses but could not find any. He returned to the station at 9:55 pm. Inderjeet's report had invoked no response. At 10:15 pm, the father called the police and gave them the descriptions of the children. The father searched places where the children might have possibly gone to, including the Willingdon Hospital and returned home at 11:30 pm.

The bodies were discovered by a cowherd, Mohan Das, grazing his cows in Delhi Ridge on 28 August 1978, at 6 pm. The cowherd reported the bodies to a patrolling constable, Rohtas Singh, at 12:00 am. Sub-inspector Hari Chand was sent to the site. The parents were called to the site to identify the bodies. They identified them as their children.

The autopsy was conducted by the police surgeon, Bharat Singh, on 29 August. He found the bodies to be in an advanced stage of decomposition. He could not establish sexual assault of Geeta due to the advanced decomposition of her body. He found multiple stab wounds and a broken jaw on Geeta. He confirmed multiple stab wounds on Sanjay.

The father decided to go to the media. Some newspapers carried photographs. On seeing such news, M. S. Nanda gave his statement. The police, in the course of their investigation, suspected the duo to be involved. They released the photos to the press, and a monetary reward was announced. The Mumbai Police was informed.

On 31 August, a car matching the kidnapping vehicle was found in Majlis Park with the number DHD 7034. A car had been reported missing of the same make, but with the number DEA 1221, so the police called the owner, Ashok Sharma. The car had been stolen from outside the Ashoka Hotel within six weeks of its purchase. Sharma was able to open the car with his keys. The stereo and speakers were missing. The car's white grille had been replaced with a black one. Two witnesses who lived in the area later said they had seen a man driving the car, and he had asked them for directions.

The car was examined by investigators from the Central Forensic Science Laboratory. Several fingerprints were obtained from the car. A cigarette butt and hair samples were found and taken. Bloodstains were discovered. Plates with the numbers DEA 1221, HRF 5411, and HRK 8930 were found in the car. In the lab, it was found that one of the plates originally had the number DHI 280, but it had been painted over. Similarly, another number, DHD 3548, was found. Some soil samples taken from the floor mat matched the soil samples from the site where the bodies were found.

The story got much media attention in India. Then-Prime Minister Morarji Desai took personal interest in the case. The Janata Party, which was in power in Delhi in 1978, was criticised for their handling of the case. They lost the subsequent election.

== Arrest and interrogation ==
The kidnappers were arrested on a train a few days later on 8 September 1978. On that day, the two kidnappers boarded the Kalka Mail when it had slowed near the Yamuna river bridge near Agra. The compartment they entered was reserved for military personnel, so they were asked to show their identity cards. They started a scuffle with the army-men and were suppressed. Lance Naik A. V. Shetty recognised them from a newspaper picture. On 9 September 1978, they were handed over to Inspector V. P. Gupta at the New Delhi railway station. They were held in separate non-adjoining cells.

On searching their bags, the police found a sword. Their clothes were found to have bloodstains. The doctor examining them found bruises on their arms and bodies, some of which were recent from a scuffle. The doctor found the sutures on Billa's head and estimated it to be 15 days old. A wound on Ranga's forearm was found to be 15 days old. Fingerprints, saliva, blood and hair samples were taken on 12 September. On 13 September, on Billa's directions, they were driven separately to Agra, where the police recovered a sword from a rented room in Sita Nagar where they were staying.

== Trial ==
=== Confessions ===
On 22 September, Ranga made a voluntary confession which was recorded by a metropolitan magistrate, but the statement was later retracted on 20 November. On 19 October, Billa gave a similar confession, but retracted it on 27 October. Both confessions included accounts of rape. Billa was noted to be "having sadistic pleasure while recalling the situation" as he had "started laughing after describing the ghastly killing of Sanjay". The confessions were later held to be independent as they had been kept in non-adjoining cells.

=== Evidence ===
The hair found in the car and on Sanjay's body matched that of Ranga. His fingerprints were found in the car. The bloodstains on his shirt belonged to blood group AB, which was a match with the siblings. Billa's hair was found on the body of Geeta, and blood matching his blood group A was found in the car. Blood of group AB was found on his clothes. The signature at the Willingdon Hospital matched that of Billa. The skiagrams of the skulls matched.

Geeta's body was in an advanced stage of decomposition at the point of her autopsy. Although this made it difficult to ascertain penetration, there was no doubt that she was stripped naked. When she left her house, she was wearing her brassiere and underwear. Geeta's dead body did not have these undergarments. In these circumstances, the court found that the initial retracted confessions on rape were, beyond a reasonable doubt, true.

The court did not ascertain whether it was Ranga or Billa who conducted the physical act of the murder(s) as the accounts they were relying on were only those of the two criminals themselves, which had been repeatedly found to be false. The court found the matter of determining the same of no particular significance.

=== Defence and alibi ===
Both men pleaded not guilty.

Billa claimed that he was in Bombay from 25 August to 1 September. He said he had acquired the head injury while trying to steal a car in Agripada, Bombay. Billa claimed he was forced to make a false confession. He said he was wanted by the Bombay police for false cases, so he had fled to Delhi with Ranga. They had come to Delhi on 15 August. On 18 August, they went to Panipat where Ranga's sister lived. On 25 August, both left for Bombay. On the 28th, he got his head wound. On 31 August, he left for Delhi, where he was informed by Ranga that they were wanted for the murders. They then tried to hide out in Delhi. They were trying to escape to Madras via Delhi when they were caught by the army men. He claimed he had been tortured by the police to confess. Ranga said that the sword was planted on him and that when his clothes were taken from him, they had no bloodstains.

They also produced witnesses to establish Billa's alibi but the court found his plea of alibi to be false.

=== Witnesses ===
Two doctors from the Willingdon Hospital who examined Billa on the night of 26 August could not positively identify him. The radiographer opined that the original skiagraph of that man matched the recent skiagraph of Billa's. Sub-inspector Chander could positively identify the two. Sohan Lal, a landlord in Majlis Park, identified and said that they had rented a room from him on 24 August and stayed there till 31 August. He said that he had seen a bandage on Billa's head on 27 August. Another witness, Parkash, the proprietor of a hotel in Fatehpur, said that he had given the two a room from 16 August to 23 August. Anil Kumar Gupta, who worked in a guest house near Gali Telian in Delhi, said he had given them a room from 31 August to 2 September. Susheel Kumar, a parking attendant, had charged them for parking at Buddha Jayanti Park. He had noticed a boy and girl in the rear. Avdesh Singh Sharma, a physician from Agra, said he had removed Billa's stitches on 4 September, but Billa had left without paying him.

=== Verdict and sentence ===
It was established by the court that the duo had come to Delhi to escape the Bombay police. They arrived in Delhi on 16 August and lived in various places under false names. They had two ceremonial kirpans, one small and one large (hereafter referred to as "sword" to distinguish between the two), and had gotten them sharpened elsewhere. Billa was proficient in stealing cars and had gotten fake number plates painted. He stole a Fiat from outside the Ashoka Hotel. They rented a room in Majlis Park, paid for two months in advance. They picked up the children sometime between 6:30 and 6:40 pm on 26 August. Sanjay received a wound on his shoulder. At 7:30 pm, the car was parked near the Buddha Jayanti Park. Ranga bought two ice creams and three Campa Colas. Sanjay's autopsy established that he had eaten a milk product before death but his body had not digested the milk products by the time he died. At 9:30 pm, the teenagers were murdered in the woods near the Upper Ridge Road, Delhi. Geeta's body was found with her undergarments missing. On 30 August, Ranga abandoned the car in Majlis Park, a few streets away from where they were living. On 31 August, after the police found the car, the duo left.

==== Events as established from confessions ====
Although the confessions weren’t considered in the sentencing, they were noted to have certain relevant details. According to Ranga's retracted statement, Ranga was initially a truck driver and later a taxi driver. He was introduced to Billa by one Sham Singh in Bombay. The two had kidnapped a boy in Bombay using Ranga's taxi.

Ranga later released the child after keeping him at his house for some time. Sham told him Billa was a well-known criminal who had killed two Arab men. Soon afterwards, Sham was arrested. The duo feared that Sham would reveal their ties to the police. They fled to Surat in the car with another person. There they left the car and took a bus to Ahmedabad. They then took a train to Delhi. On 17 August, they stole a car but abandoned it because it was not in good condition. On 18 August, Ranga went to Panipat to meet his sister for Raksha Bandhan. On 19 August, they stole another car and changed its plates but abandoned it after finding it had bad acceleration. That day, the car used in the crime was stolen from Ashoka Hotel, and they changed its plates. On 23 August, Billa threatened to kill Jugal and another person, Kewal. On 24 August, they rented the house in Majlis Park. They decided that they would kidnap a couple the next day, then force them to take them to their house so they could rob it, but they found no victims while roaming in the car.

On 26 August, after roaming all day, they found the siblings and thought them to be from a rich family. They offered them a lift and the children accepted. The children were talking in English. Billa had already loosened the inner door handles; he then pulled them out. The children began quarrelling with Billa, who then tried to frighten them with the small kirpan. Sanjay tried to snatch the kirpan but was injured. The victims in the struggle managed to stall the car. At one point, Ranga saw a Sikh man following them. He suggested dropping off the children and fleeing. Billa refused.

They then parked the car in Buddha Jayanti Park. Sanjay asked for water and was offered cola. He refused but accepted ice cream instead on Geeta's suggestion. They changed the car number to DHI 280. The children were asked about their parents. They replied that their father was a naval officer. Ranga suggested the kids should be let off, as the father probably did not have much money and might try to fight them. Billa told the children that Geeta would be used in a robbery in which she would stop a jeweller's car coming from Palam airport, asking for a lift. After that, they told them that they would be let them go. They drove onto an unpaved road and then took Sanjay about 100 yards away from the vehicle. Ranga was allegedly forced by Billa to attack Sanjay with a longer kirpan, about 3 feet long. After one blow, Sanjay's protests provoked Billa to snatch the kirpan from Ranga and repeatedly strike Sanjay for 10 minutes until he died.

While Ranga cleaned the blade, Billa raped Geeta. Then Billa asked Ranga to rape Geeta, which he did. When Geeta was being raped again, she picked up the kirpan and struck Billa's head. Geeta ran toward the road, but Ranga caught her. They made her dress and told her they were taking her back to her brother nearby. While she was walking ahead, Billa attacked her from behind and killed her. They washed the car to remove most of the blood. On 28 August, Billa left for Bombay by train. On 30 August, Ranga found that some Bombay policemen were in Delhi. He changed plates and parked the car a few lanes away from his rented place. On 31 August, he saw the police had found the car. Billa returned the same day. They left for Agra on 31 August.

Billa's version of the events varied slightly. According to him, they had given Sanjay Mandrax tablets to dull his pain from the cuts he received in the scuffle. Billa claimed that the rape of Geeta was Ranga's idea. They drove to a deserted place. Ranga took Sanjay away, and Billa raped Geeta. Ranga returned alone and raped her. Geeta asked about her brother and got suspicious. She attacked Billa with the sword. Ranga snatched the sword away and killed her. Ranga then told Billa he had killed Sanjay. They then dumped Geeta in the bushes and drove away.

==== Sentencing ====
Kuljeet Singh (alias Ranga Kush) and Jasbir Singh (alias Billa) were convicted and sentenced to death under Section 302 (murder) of the Indian Penal Code, read with Section 34 (common intention), by an additional sessions judge in Delhi. They were also convicted for crimes under Section 363 (kidnapping), 365 (kidnapping with unlawful confinement), 366 (kidnapping a woman with intention of sexual intercourse) and 367 (kidnapping with intention to cause hurt), read with Section 34.

== Appeals ==
The convicts challenged the death sentence verdict in the Delhi High Court. The High Court upheld the judgement on 16 November 1979. The convicts then petitioned under Article 136 in the Supreme Court of India, which was turned down. They then petitioned the President of India to use the clemency powers vested in him under Article 72 of the Constitution. The president turned down the petition without citing reason. They then petitioned the Supreme Court again, arguing that the president should use his clemency powers fairly.

On 21 April 1981, the Supreme Court upheld the death sentences. These petitions had further delayed their death sentences. The trials took about four years to complete.

== Death row interviews and execution ==
Following the judgement, some journalists petitioned the Tihar jail that they be allowed to interview the death row convicts. The jail authorities rejected the petition because their Jail Manual allowed interviews only with relatives, friends and legal advisers. Journalist Prabha Dutt decided to challenge the rejection of interview requests in court.

On 7 November 1981, the Supreme Court of India decided that the convicts should be allowed to be interviewed by some journalists, if they were willing. The journalists were granted permission to interview them together, for an hour, and to submit to a search before entering the prison. The judgement is considered a landmark in Indian law.

On 30 January 1982, five reporters — among them Prabha Dutt of Hindustan Times, Prakash Patra of The National Herald, and Usha Rai of The Times of India — were allowed to conduct the interview. The convict interviewed was Jasbir Singh alias Billa, who insisted that he was innocent. Ranga refused to be interviewed.

Both were hanged on 31 January 1982. Billa was quiet, but Ranga resisted going to the gallows. Their bodies were not claimed by their relatives.

== Aftermath ==
The Kirti Chakra was awarded to the children on 5 April 1981. In 1978, the Indian Council for Child Welfare instituted two bravery awards for children under the age of 16, the Sanjay Chopra Award and the Geeta Chopra Award, given each year along with the National Bravery Awards.

== See also ==
- 2012 Delhi rape case, a 2012 case that also got wide media attention
- Adnan Patrawala murder case, a 2007 kidnapping and murder case in Mumbai
- List of kidnappings
- List of solved missing person cases
