= 2022 West Bengal cow smuggling scam =

2022 cow smuggling scam in India

West Bengal cow smuggling scam is an ongoing cattle theft in India scam going on since August 2022. The scam is currently being jointly investigated by Enforcement Directorate, Central Bureau of Investigation and National Investigation Agency. The scam was revealed following the arrest of senior leader of Trinamool Congress and president of Birbhum district Trinamool Congress, Anubrata Mondal, who is also known to be a close aide of West Bengal Chief Minister Mamata Banerjee by the agencies.

== Background ==
The cattle smuggle is considered to be illegal in India. The racket was active mainly in the states of West Bengal, Jharkhand, Uttar Pradesh, Haryana, Rajasthan and Kerala. The main purpose of the racket was to smuggle thousands of cattle to the neighbouring country of Bangladesh through the state's border.

The case was first came when JD Mathew, who was the BSF commander in Bengal, was arrested from Kerala in 2018.

Then, in September 2021, CBI registered an FIR against six persons including Satish Kumar, who was a BSF commandant in the South Bengal region, along with the kingpin Enamul Haque, and his aides and other smmuglers, Anarul Sheikh, Md. Gulam Mustafa in 2016 and 2017.

Later, ED arrested Haque in February 2022, from the CBI custody in November 2020 and Satish Kumar in April 2022.

Later, Anubrata Mondal's security personnel Saigal Hossain was interrogated by the agencies and was arrested following the interrogation in June 2022. Following the arrest of Saigal, he revealed the name of Anubrata Mondal in the interrogation and the agencies sent the summon letter to Anubrata Mondal for interrogation in May 2022.

On 11 August 2022, the CBI arrested Anubrata Mondal, following the interrogation in his Bolpur residence. CBI also claimed that he was not cooperating with the agencies to investigate the scam. The agency also raided 13 locations including the residences of a close aide to Anubrata, Karim Khan and Ziaul Haque at Ilambazar, Nanoor and other parts of several areas of Birbhum. Following his arrest, he was brought to Kolkata for further interrogation, with necessary medical tests.

On 7 October 2022, CBI filed the charge sheet in the court in Asansol against Anubrata, where the charges were brought against him under Section 420 (Cheating) of the Indian Penal Code and several sections of The Prevention of Corruption Act.

In November 2022, Anubrata Mondal's custody was taken by ED from CBI. Later, in December 2022, Anubrata Mondal moved to Delhi High Court for bail plea and to avoid of taking him to New Delhi for further investigation by the agencies. However the plea was dismissed by the court later.

In January 2023, he again moved to the court for bail plea, but again denied. He was moved to Tihar Jail in Delhi from Asansol in April.

Also, in April, Anubrata Mondal's daughter Sukanya Mondal was summoned by ED for three times. She went for interrogation to ED Delhi office with all the documents.

On 26 April 2023, Sukanya Mondal was also arrested, following the interrogation by ED in New Delhi and sent to 3-day custody. She applied for a bail plea twice in the court, but both the time, it was denied.

On 22 February 2024, actor Dev was interrogated for 8 hours by ED in connection with the scam.

On 30 July 2024, Anubrata was granted bail by Supreme Court on the case.

On 10 September 2024, Sukanya was also granted bail from Supreme court.

== Reactions ==
Soon after the arrest of Anubrata Mondal, Trinamool Congress leaders condemned the arrest and blamed Bharatiya Janata Party for the arrest and to malign the party's image in Bengal, but they also said that they are keeping an eye on the situation and there is absolutely no comprise on it. BJP Birbhum leadership celebrated the occasion in the various party offices across Birbhum district in Rampurhat, Siuri, Bolpur and Sainthia.

BJP state president Sukanta Majumdar said that it is the beginning of the Mamata Banerjee's end. He also said that like Partha Chatterjee and Anubrata's arrest, other TMC leaders also would get arrested soon.

TMC Minister and Mayor of Kolkata, Firhad Hakim said that the central agencies would not be able to keep Anubrata behind the bars for a long time, as he is a "Banglar Bagh" (Bengal's tiger).

== See also ==
- 2022 West Bengal School Service Commission recruitment scam
- 2026 West Bengal election controversies
