= Yogita Bihani =

Indian actress (born 1995)

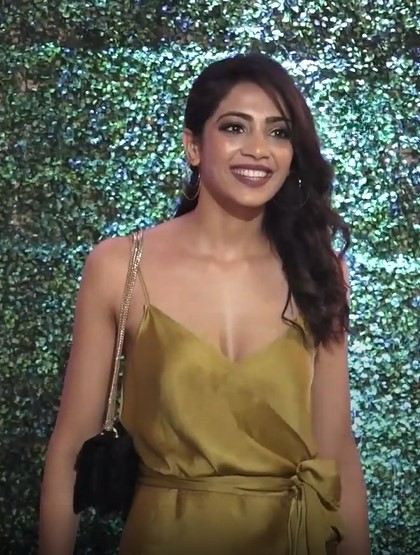
- Bihani in 2019
- Born: Bikaner, Rajasthan, India
- Education: Delhi University
- Occupation: Actress
- Years active: 2017–present
- Partner: Aaryamann Sethi (2025–present)

Yogita Bihani is an Indian actress who primarily works in Hindi films. Bihani made her acting debut with the soap opera Dil Hi Toh Hai (2018–2020). She expanded to films with AK vs AK (2020) and then starred in The Kerala Story (2023), which is her highest grossing release.

== Early life ==
Bihani was born in Bikaner, into a Maheshwari Marwari Bania family of 5 siblings and was raised in Delhi. She completed her graduation from Delhi University in Computer Science. After completing her graduation from Delhi, she joined Redfoodie Startup in Faridabad, Delhi NCR and worked there till 2016.

== Career ==
Bihani's career in glamour world began in 2018 when she participated and was selected amongst Top 3 contestants in Femina Miss India Rajasthan 2018.

However her biggest break came in April 2018 when she was selected to shoot for the promo with Salman Khan for his upcoming gameshow Dus Ka Dum on Sony TV.

After the promo went on air, she was spotted by Ekta Kapoor an Indian film and television producer who later selected her to play the lead role opposite Karan Kundra in her next show Dil Hi Toh Hai.

She talked about her life challenges and how her choices shaped her career in her TEDx talk titled 'The Crossroad of Choices' in November 2020.

Bihani in The Kerala Story played the role of Nimah Mathews, a strong and difficult-to-influence individual to a woman in despair, after suffering a heinous incident.

== Personal life ==
Bihani is in a relationship with singer-songwriter and YouTuber Aaryamann Sethi, who performs under the stage name "Aary". Sethi is the son of actors Archana Puran Singh and Parmeet Sethi.

The couple's relationship was publicly announced in July 2025 when Sethi revealed it through his YouTube channel "Aary Vlogs" in a video titled "I SURPRISED MY GIRLFRIEND! - DAY 7". Bihani has since made regular appearances on Sethi's YouTube channel and they have collaborated professionally, with her featuring in his music videos "Chhoti Baatein" and "Madhubala" in 2025.

In August 2025, the couple got engaged. Aaryamann proposed with the keyring of his parents bungalow in a small ceremony shared to their youtube channel.

== Filmography ==
Key
†	Denotes films that have not yet been released

=== Films ===
Year	Title	Role	Notes	Ref.
2020	AK vs AK	Yogita		
2021	Date Aaj Kal	Tara	Short film	
2022	Vikram Vedha	Chanda		
2023	The Kerala Story	Nimah Mathews		
2026	Vadh 2	Naina Kumari		

=== Short films ===
Year	Title	Role	Notes	Ref.
2024	Friends		Directed by Atul Mongia; Also writer	

=== Television ===
Year	Title	Role	Notes	Ref.
2017	Femme Foodies	Contestant		
2018	10 Ka Dum	Contestant		
2018–2020	Dil Hi Toh Hai	Dr. Palak Sharma Noon		
2019	Kavach... Maha Shivratri	Manju Patwardhan		

=== Music videos ===
Year	Title	Singer(s)	Ref.
2023	Alone	Kapil Sharma, Guru Randhawa	
2023	Ishq Ka Asar	Stebin Ben	
2025	Chhoti Baatein	Aaryamann Sethi	
2025	Madhubala	Aaryamann Sethi	
