= Black Warrant (TV series) =

Indian streaming television series

- Genre: Crime drama; Thriller
- Created by: Vikramaditya Motwane; Satyanshu Singh
- Based on: Black Warrant by Sunetra Choudhury and Sunil Gupta
- Written by: Arkesh Ajay; Satyanshu Singh
- Directed by: Vikramaditya Motwane; Satyanshu Singh; Arkesh Ajay; Rohin Raveendran Nair; Ambiecka Pandit
- Starring: Zahan Kapoor; Rahul Bhat; Paramvir Singh Cheema; Anurag Thakur
- Music by: Ajay Jayanthi
- Country of origin: India
- Original language: Hindi
- No. of series: 1
- No. of episodes: 7

Production
- Cinematography: Saumyananda Sahi
- Editor: Tanya Chhabria
- Running time: 38–50 minutes
- Production companies: Applause Entertainment; Andolan Films; Confluence Media

Original release
- Network: Netflix
- Release: 10 January 2025 – present

Black Warrant is 2025 Indian Hindi-language crime drama thriller television series based on the 2019 non-fiction book Black Warrant: Confessions of a Tihar Jailer by Sunil Gupta and Sunetra Choudhury, about Gupta's time as a jailer at Tihar Prisons. Created by Vikramaditya Motwane and Satyanshu Singh, it stars Zahan Kapoor as Gupta, alongside Rahul Bhat, Paramvir Singh Cheema, and Anurag Thakur.

The series, consisting of seven episodes, was released on Netflix on 10 January 2025.

== Premise ==
Beginning in the early 1980s, Black Warrant is based on historical events told from the perspective of Sunil Gupta, who was a jailer for 35 years at Tihar Prisons. The first season covers Gupta's experiences until 1984, and features real-life criminals, including Charles Sobhraj and Ranga-Billa.

== Cast and characters ==
=== Main ===
- Zahan Kapoor as Sunil Kumar Gupta
- Rahul Bhat as DSP Rajesh Tomar
- Paramvir Singh Cheema as Shivraj Singh Mangat
- Anurag Thakur as Vipin Dahiya

=== Recurring ===
- Sidhant Gupta as Charles Sobhraj
- Joy Sengupta as SP JP Singh
- Tota Roy Choudhury as SP Mukhopadhyay
- Rajendra Gupta as Saini Saab
- Sahib Singh as Zail Singh
- Mir Sarwar as Maqbool Bhat
- Rajshri Deshpande as Pratibha Sen
- Saamya Jainn as Priya
- Megha Burman as Seema
- Kamal Batra as Garvit Duggal
- Shivani Dubey as Kavita Soni
- Neelu Dogra as Sunil's mother
- Priya Chauhan as Shalini Tomar
- Puran Gabbi as Ranga
- Ramnish Chaudhary as Billa
- Maithili Jha as Geeta Chopra
- Aryan Raj as Sanjay Chopra
- Saroj Mishra as Kartar Singh
- Mukesh Pachode as Ujagar Singh

== Episodes ==
No.	Title	Directed by	Written by	Original release date
1	"The Snake (Saanp)"	Vikramaditya Motwane	Satyanshu Singh	10 January 2025
Sunil Gupta lands a job as a jailer at Tihar Prisons in 1981. Other new joinees are the Sikh Shivraj Singh Mangat and the hot-headed Haryanvi Vipin Dahiya. Gupta, naive and idealistic, immediately clashes with his belligerent superior DSP Rajesh Tomar. A murdered snake in the prison leads Gupta to unravel the workings of the prison, chiefly the warring Tyagi and Haddi gangs. Gupta also meets the serial killer Charles Sobhraj, who seemingly takes a liking to him.
2	"Gallows (Phaansi Kothi)"	Vikramaditya Motwane	Arkesh Ajay	10 January 2025
The criminals Billa and Ranga, accused of the Geeta and Sanjay Chopra murder, are issued a black warrant for their execution. Gupta is handed the responsibility of overseeing their hanging and dealing with the media. An idealistic journalist Pratibha Sen seeks to interview them.
3	"Macho (Dhaakad)"	Rohin Raveendran	Satyanshu Singh	10 January 2025
Around 200 students of Jawaharlal Nehru University are arrested for political dissent. They stage a jailbreak, and the responsibility falls on Mangat to figure out how. Meanwhile, Gupta, termed meek by his co-workers, attempts to change his ways.
4	"Team Player"	Ambiecka Pandit	Arkesh Ajay	10 January 2025
Dahiya begins an affair with Seema, the lonely wife of SP Mukhopadhyay. Gupta discovers their secret, but is urged by Dahiya to help him, as he has now agreed to an arranged marriage. Gupta buys earrings on Dahiya's behalf, as a parting gift for Seema. Mukhopadhyay discovers the earrings and suspects Gupta as Seema's lover. When questioned and threatened by him, Gupta discloses the truth about Dahiya. Mukhopadhyay seeks a transfer away from Tihar, and Seema, beaten by her husband, publicly expresses her love for Dahiya. An angered Dahiya, discovering Gupta's betrayal, berates him for not being a team player.
5	"Prison Food (Jail Ka Khana)"	Satyanshu Singh	Satyanshu Singh	10 January 2025
Gupta attempts to help poor prisoners by setting up a legal aid for them, but clashes with his corrupt superiors. An audit leads to Tomar and his aids manipulating the numbers, and the blame for stealing money from prison funds falls on Gupta. A disillusioned Gupta is blackmailed by Tomar to join them in stealing funds so he can eventually pay off the fine that he now owes & Prisoners Kartar and Ujagar Singh are Executed
6	"The Blanket (Kambal)"	Arkesh Ajay	Arkesh Ajay	10 January 2025
During a cold spell, the prisoners stage a hunger strike due to a lack of blankets. Gupta discovers that Tomar and SP JP Singh are stealing money meant for the prisoners. Disillusioned by past experiences, he does not pursue it, dismissing the accountant Saini's offer to help. Saini sets out by himself to report them, but is mocked and blackmailed by them. He kills himself by suicide, and a distraught Gupta discovers his body. Meanwhile, the political prisoner, Maqbool Bhat is executed.
7	"Double Life Sentence (Double Umar Qaid)"	Vikramaditya Motwane	Satyanshu Singh	10 January 2025
After Indira Gandhi's assassination, nationwide riots break out, particularly targetting the Sikhs. All Sikh officers, including Mangat, are transferred by Tomar. To deal with the increasing gang-related violence in the prison, Gupta plots a plan with Dahiya, Mangat and Tomar, to separate the gangs by bribing and dividing key members of each gang. Having restored some peace to the prison, Gupta spots a peacock in the courtyard. Meanwhile, Sobhraj escapes by feeding spiked sweets to the prison guards.

== Production ==
In June 2020, it was announced that Vikramaditya Motwane will be adapting the 2019 non-fiction book Black Warrant: Confessions of a Tihar Jailer by Sunil Gupta and Sunetra Choudhury into a streaming series. Motwane's production company Andolan Films and journalist Josy Joseph's company Confluence Media acquired the rights for the adaptation. Subsequently, Applause Entertainment acquired the rights and entered production for two and a half-years, before selling the finished product to Netflix.

Motwane said that Zahan Kapoor was cast in the lead role of Sunil Gupta after a blind audition process while Rahul Bhat was cast after he saw his performance in Kennedy (2023). Apart from Gupta's character, the other jailers shown in the series were fictional or composites of characters from the book.

== Release ==
The series began streaming on Netflix on 10 January 2025.

== Reception ==
=== Critical response ===
Shubhra Gupta of The Indian Express wrote that the "series goes the full yard in attempting to unpack the intricate power structure and showcasing caste-and-religious hierarchies in rough-tough Tihar Jail". Scroll.in's Nandini Ramnath considered it a "grim show" about the "brutalities of prison life". She appreciated the work of cinematographer Saumyananda Sahi and production designer Mukund Gupta, as well as the performance of Rahul Bhat. Saibal Chatterjee of NDTV opined, "As a piercing look at Tihar, an absorbing story of a baptism by fire and an insightful snapshot of an era in the life of a nation, Black Warrant warrants bingeing on". He was particularly impressed by the portrayal of "a male protagonist who upends notions of belligerence that popular films perpetuate".

Writing for The Hollywood Reporter India, Rahul Desai termed it "skilfully written, performed and crafted" and took note of its ability to subverse "easy tropes and resolutions". The Hindu's Shilajit Mitra wrote, "Black Warrant is a grim, discomfiting series, and the flashes of levity and camaraderie only serve to reinforce the tone." He was also appreciative of the performances of Bhat, Zahan Kapoor, and Rajendra Gupta. Shajin Shrijith of The Wire considered its quality to be in the same league as the shows Paatal Lok and Kohrra.

=== Audience viewership ===
According to data released by Netflix, Black Warrant was streamed by 2.3 million viewers in its first three days.

=== Awards and nominations ===
Name of the award ceremony, year presented, category, nominee of the award, and the result of the nomination
Award ceremony	Year	Category	Nominee	Result	Ref.
Asia Contents Awards & Global OTT Awards	2025	Best Creative	Black Warrant	Pending	
Asia Contents Awards & Global OTT Awards	2025	Best Newcomer Actor	Zahan Kapoor	Pending	
