= A Feast of Vultures =

2016 book by Josy Joseph

A Feast of Vultures: The Hidden Business of Democracy in India
- First edition
- Author: Josy Joseph
- Language: English
- Published: 28 July 2016
- Publisher: HarperCollins India
- Publication place: India
- Media type: Print
- Pages: 256
- ISBN: 978-9-35-029751-3

A Feast of Vultures: The Hidden Business of Democracy in India is a 2016 book by Indian investigative journalist Josy Joseph. It examines and documents the democracy of modern India, drawing attention to corruption in both business and government, and the intertwining of money and muscle power in politics.

== Summary ==
A Feast of Vultures is a multi-level inquiry into the Indian government, which examines, investigates and analyzes several major political scandals and highlights evidence of corruption against some of the country's largest political and business figures and houses. The book places particular focus on government-affiliated individuals who conduct business through their personal connections, resulting in what it argues are some of the country's largest business monopolies. This corruption is illustrated through examples of needs: a village needs a road and a hospital, a graveyard that needs a wall, and people that need toilets. In addition, the book describes the ways individuals navigated their business and how the government meets those needs. The book examines the role of intermediaries in the Indian political scenario and how they function in the government settings.

The book contrasts the lives of the anonymous poor with those of the rich and famous, and how the wealth gap undermines democratic processes. It reports on the flourishing phenomenon of middlemen who facilitate access to decision makers and manipulate government decisions. It is suggested that "a whole caste of middlemen" sustains and perpetuates corruption in India. It is prevalent from the lowest police post to the offices of the prime minister and president.

A particular segment of the economy is examined to show how democratic institutions are easily manipulated by ambitious and well-funded businessmen, who seek preferential treatment directly or through intermediaries including organized crime figures. Through a detailed investigation, the author provides his own evidence, arguing that some of modern India's most successful entrepreneurs have thrived through bribes, manipulation, and possibly even murder.

In the final segment of the book, Joseph argues that India's elite are the beneficiaries of corruption, using their financial and political clout to steer policy-making and legislation.. The elite are described as 'puppet masters' who straddle political and economic power, unencumbered by either democratic accountability or regulatory oversight.

== Conception and writing ==
Joseph has described his book as "an angst-ridden narrative on the distortion of our democracy." Rohan Venkataramakrishnan of Scroll.in stated that Joseph sought to cover stories which were untold due to concerns of litigation. Joseph said in an interview with the news site that he had observed unprecedented self-censorship by reporters, implying that they and their publishers were fearful of legal action. He said that journalists had thus "forgotten our duty and become lapdogs of the establishment." Joseph said that A Feast of Vultures was his first effort in uncensored journalism of modern India.

== Cover ==
The cover of A Feast of Vultures combines two images: a Corbis / Getty Images photograph of the bed of a farmer who committed suicide, his photograph propped up against a pillow, with a background of skyscrapers.

== Interviews ==
In an interview with Rohan Venkataramakrishnan for Scroll.in, Joseph said:

- "I'm the father of a 13-year-old girl. I would rather set an example for her than let my friends in the industry be happy or be scared of someone. I'm ready for it, if there is any litigation, I think it would be a great fight to have".
- "Very honestly, I've been in Delhi for 25 years, and I've never seen this level of self-censorship in public discourse, ever. The worst is the self-censorship that reporters are subjecting themselves to, and the distortion of facts. I hope it's a short-lived phenomenon. In a young country like ours, you cannot suppress dissent. At least not forever."
- "It's an embarrassing thing for journalists, though. We've forgotten our duty and become lapdogs of the establishment. Some of us will have to stand up and fight, and be firm about values. It is when we stand up, then things will change."

In an interview with Preetha Nair for TheNewsMinute.com, Joseph said:

- "It is a coincidence that my book comes at a time when we are celebrating 25 years of liberalisation and 70 years of independence. A lot of us born in the socialist era have come to believe that middlemen are part of our system. Liberalisation has given a fillip to middlemen and they've grown a hundred times. If you get the right middleman, you can even buy a government. My book is an angst-ridden narrative on the distortion of our democracy".
- "One of the fundamental flaws in our system is that Indian politics sucks in a lot of black money and our corporates are forced to feed the political class. If we can bring transparency in political funding, that itself will diminish corruption".

In an interview with Syed Firdaus Ashraf for Rediff.com, Joseph said:

- "As reporters, we are always dealing with a tiny bit of a large puzzle. We are also hamstrung by space limitations, various kinds of censorships imposed by corporate, political and such interests as well as other restrictions. I wanted to report and interpret modern India without any self-censorship, varnishing or any other considerations. A Feast Of Vultures is my first step in this direction".

== Reception ==
=== Critical reviews ===
Reviews of the book were largely positive. Harish Khare, editor of The Tribune, called it "an irritatingly brilliant book [told] with considerable competence and style." He further described it as a sobering and condemning view absent from newspapers. Rishi Raj of The Financial Express agreed that the realistic viewpoint was rarely seen in journalism or academic works, and recommended it to analysts and those interested in an uncompromising look at post-independence India.

Soutik Biswas of OPEN magazine called it "an ambitious inquiry of what ails India [...] Part memoir, part reportage and part polemic". Aditya Sinha of Mint stated that it was "meticulously researched and intelligently written" and "reads like a thriller". Namrata Biji Ahuja of The Week called it a "fascinating tale of modern India and its journey as a liberal economy" and a call to action against "the business-as-usual approach which allows crony capitalism, scandals and scams."

=== Awards ===
In January 2018, A Feast of Vultures was named the best book of 2017 by the jury in the non-fiction category of the Crossword Book Award. Competing entries included books by Amitav Ghosh, Pradeep Damodaran, Pankaj Mishra and Shashi Tharoor.

== Malayalam Edition ==
A Feast of Vultures: The Hidden Business of Democracy in India, released in English in 2016, was translated into Malayalam by K.N. Ashok, a noted journalist and author, and published by Azhimukham Media Private Limited in July 2021. The Malayalam edition has a new introduction and additions not included in the original English edition.
