= AK vs AK =

2020 film by Vikramaditya Motwane

- Official release poster
- Directed by: Vikramaditya Motwane
- Screenplay by: Avinash Sampath; Vikramaditya Motwane
- Dialogues by: Anurag Kashyap
- Story by: Avinash Sampath
- Produced by: Deepa De Motwane; Anurag Kashyap; David Taghioff
- Starring: Anil Kapoor; Anurag Kashyap; Yogita Bihani
- Cinematography: Swapnil S. Sonawane
- Edited by: Bunty Bhansali
- Music by: Songs: Alokananda Dasgupta; Rākhis; Nuka; Background Score: Alokananda Dasgupta
- Production company: Andolan Films
- Distributed by: Netflix
- Release date: 24 December 2020
- Running time: 108 minutes
- Country: India
- Language: Hindi

AK vs AK is a 2020 Indian Hindi-language comedy thriller film directed by Vikramaditya Motwane and is the first release under his banner Andolan Films. Anurag Kashyap, the executive producer and dialogue writer, also stars alongside Anil Kapoor as the title characters with debutante Yogita Bihani in a pivotal role.

The story, written by Avinash Sampath, utilises a film-within-a-film narrative where the main actors play fictionalised versions of themselves. After a public feud between Kashyap, an eccentric film director, and Anil Kapoor, an ageing film star, the former kidnaps the latter's daughter (Sonam Kapoor Ahuja) and forces Kapoor to search for her while his assistant (Bihani) films them as part of his next project, with most of the film shown from the perspective of her camera.

The idea for the film was conceived by Sampath in 2013, and development started after he sent it to Motwane. At first, the film's title was AK vs SK, with Shahid Kapoor (Note: Anil Kapoor and Shahid Kapoor are not related to each other.) playing himself in the latter role, but schedule conflicts caused the film to be shelved in 2016. The project was resurrected in late 2019 with Anil Kapoor in the role instead and a new script. Filming took place a couple of months later, and after an unconventional marketing campaign launched a few weeks before the film's release, AK vs AK debuted on Netflix as one of the service's original films on 24 December 2020, coinciding with Kapoor's 64th birthday and Christmas Eve. It initially received positive reviews, with praise going to the film's novel structure, the two leads' performances, and its exploration of the film industry, though critics found the ending and its buildup underwhelming.

== Plot ==
The film starts from the camera of an aspiring filmmaker, Yogita, who is filming Anurag Kashyap for a documentary. Kashyap and Anil Kapoor are interviewed by Sucharita Tyagi for a MAMI event. After an audience member asks if the director or the actor is more important, they start arguing about the question and insulting each other's careers, culminating in Kashyap throwing a glass of water in Kapoor's face. This becomes a major scandal for Kashyap, with other film personalities cutting ties with him and backing out of his projects. As he sits in his bedroom, enraged, Yogita gives him an idea.

Later, on Christmas Eve and Kapoor's birthday, Kashyap visits his set along with Yogita and pitches him a new story about a mad director who kidnaps the daughter of an ageing actor. Kapoor is initially uninterested until he realises that his daughter, Sonam, has actually been abducted by Kashyap, who wants to capture his real reactions during his search. Kashyap tells him that he has ten hours (until sunrise the next day) to find her and sets four rules: he can't get anyone else involved or call the police, all phone calls must be on speakerphone, and Yogita's camera must always stay on.

Kapoor first tries going to a police station, but Kashyap and Yogita convince them it is just a rehearsal for their film. Kapoor is still somewhat unconvinced that Sonam was really abducted, so Kashyap shows a live feed of her being held by a masked man with a knife. After talking to his son Harshvardhan, Kapoor learns from her driver that she was last seen at a hotel. He bribes the manager there with an endorsement to see the CCTV footage and spots the getaway driver's face; however, his search on the streets of Mumbai returns little success. Kapoor goes home and stealthily texts Harshvardhan the truth, but his confused reaction alerts Kashyap, who confronts Kapoor upstairs. While they fight, the masked man severs Sonam's finger, so Kapoor relents. Eventually, someone directs him to a Christmas celebration, where Kapoor finds the driver, Javed, through the viewfinder. Kapoor chases him through and around Mumbai Central before a car hits him. Bloodied, Kapoor breaks down in front of the camera, regretting his absence as a father and begging Yogita for any information. Kashyap, having slowed down due to his asthma, finally arrives to taunt Kapoor and make him continue. At another Christmas celebration, Kapoor has to dance for the crowd until someone tells him where Javed lives, where they finally capture him.

Javed directs them to where he was told to take Sonam; however, Kashyap insists that Javed is lying. They end up arriving at Kashyap's house, where another video call shows Sonam in his DVD room. When they get in, Sonam is gone, and Kashyap's parents have also been abducted. After a struggle between the trio, Kashyap reveals the original site, and they go there. A mysterious masked man with another camera shows up, but they don't find anyone else as the sun rises and time runs out. Although Kashyap repeatedly claims that these events weren't in his script, Kapoor discovers a copy and forces him to read it, which states that Kashyap intentionally diverted him, then planned to take a gun from his bag and force Kapoor to choose between killing himself or Kashyap with it. Kapoor interrogates an increasingly agitated Kashyap with the aforementioned gun and accidentally shoots him.

The perspective shifts to the third person as Kapoor and Yogita drive Kashyap to the hospital. Sonam and Kashyap's parents are later found in the basement of Kashyap's home, with Kashyap being charged for their kidnapping. As he lies in his hospital bed, Kapoor reveals that he had actually planned everything: angered at Kashyap's comments, he convinced Yogita after the panel show to help frame Kashyap in exchange for a break into the industry and conspired alongside his family to make most of the dramatic turns happen, with Harshvardhan having purposely hit him with the car. Months later, the resulting film nets some Filmfare Awards for Yogita (as director) and Kapoor, while a deranged Kashyap plots vengeance from a mental asylum.

== Cast ==
- Anil Kapoor as himself
- Anurag Kashyap as himself
- Yogita Bihani as Yogita
- Vipul Deshpande

Cameo appearances

- Harsh Varrdhan Kapoor as himself
- Sucharita Tyagi as herself
- Boney Kapoor as himself
- Sonam Kapoor as herself
- Nawazuddin Siddiqui as himself (also voiceover)
- Taapsee Pannu as herself (photograph and voiceover)
- Anand Ahuja as himself (photograph and voiceover)

== Production ==
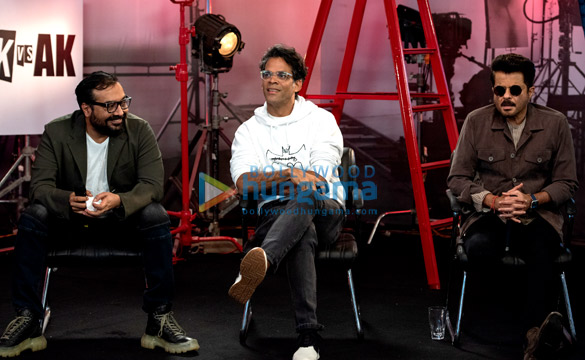
Trailer launch of AK vs AK, with (from left to right) Kashyap, Motwane and Kapoor

The film's development started in 2013, when Sampath thought of and sent the concept to Motwane. Originally, they thought of seeking Aamir Khan and Akshay Kumar as the "actor", but decided against the former and were rebuffed by the latter. Later, Shahid Kapoor took the role and the film was retitled AK vs SK, with a somewhat different story and cast as revealed in 2015; the catalyst of the plot would be Shahid Kapoor rejecting Kashyap's next film after the latter's latest venture flopped at the box office, and Shahid Kapoor's wife would be kidnapped instead. It was also initially reported that Shahid Kapoor's wife Mira Rajput would also make her debut in the film as herself, but this was later denied by Shahid Kapoor's spokesperson. Although he had already started filming for the project, Shahid Kapoor pulled out due to date clashes and it was shelved in 2016. Shahid and Motwane agreed to start working on the film again in the near future, with a planned restart in 2017. However, Motwane could only revisit the project in 2019 after finishing Bhavesh Joshi Superhero and Sacred Games, and decided to cast Anil Kapoor instead, stating he "always wanted a commercial star". He rewrote the script alongside Sampath with Kapoor in mind in August that year. Motwane gave the script to Kapoor in November; to Motwane's surprise, he received it well and allowed the film to mock him in any way. Kapoor's children, Sonam and Harshvardan, also agreed to join the project after Kapoor read the script to his family that night. On the other hand, Kapoor's wife Sunita refused to be involved in the film at all; Kashyap humorously noted "while nothing was out of bounds as far as personal attacks against each other go, the only place they weren't allowed to enter was 'Sunita's bedroom'".

AK vs AK was produced by Andolan Films, a new company that Motwane founded after the disbanding of Phantom Films, which he partially owned. Shooting took place over 21 days in late 2019 or early 2020, with Kapoor stating that "this is the fastest film I have done in my career". (Note: In a pre-release interview, Kapoor said that shooting started in December 2019, but later stated that it occurred between January and February 2020.) Although scenes were shot at Kashyap's actual house, sets were put up to stand in for the streets of Mumbai as well as Kapoor's house. However, according to Kapoor, much of the film's interactions are not staged, such as requests for selfies from Kapoor's fans throughout his search. The Guardian described shooting as taking place "under the radar" and commented on how unexpectedly close the initial announcement of the film was to its release date. Three separate trailers, one from the perspective of each "AK" and an "original, director's cut", were released at a launch ceremony on 7 December. To promote the ceremony, Kashyap and Kapoor engaged in a "Twitter war" the day before. In the weeks leading up to the film, Kapoor and Kashyap made more marketing material focusing on their "rivalry", creating videos and putting up billboards insulting each other.

== Soundtrack ==
AK vs AK

Soundtrack album by Alokananda Dasgupta, Nuka, and Rākhis
- Released: 29 December 2020
- Recorded: 2020
- Genre: Feature film soundtrack
- Length: 11:11
- Language: Hindi
- Label: Maisie Music Publishing
- Producers: Alokananda Dasgupta, Nuka and Rākhis

Official audio
- AK vs AK - Full Album on YouTube

The music for the film was mostly composed and produced by Alokananda Dasgupta (with the exception of Khalaas, which was composed by Nuka and Rākhis), who said she didn't understand the film's "technical depth" at first, but decided to interpret it as "three films within a film" and craft the score through that view. Writing for NDTV, Narinder Saini called the soundtrack "fun" and "catchy", and thought it would further increase the film's popularity. Bollywood Hungama praised the background music for fitting the film's themes, but criticised the songs Duniya Badi Gol and Ghum, stating that they "are in a wacky space". On the other hand, Roktim Rajpal of Deccan Herald described the background music as "generic".

Track listing
No.	Title	Lyrics	Performer(s)	Length
1.	"Khalaas"	Kunal Anand Padagle	Nuka, Rākhis, Anil Kapoor, Kaam Bhaari	2:50
2.	"Duniya Badi Gol"	Kunal Anand Padagle	Kaam Bhaari	1:33
3.	"Ghum"	Rajeshwari Dasgupta Ghose	Amit Trivedi	3:37
4.	"Shivali"	Rajeshwari Dasgupta Ghose	Nakash Aziz	3:11
Total length:				11:11

== Reception and analysis ==
AK vs AK was released as a Netflix original film on 24 December 2020, Kapoor's birthday and the same day most of the film takes place. The film was reviewed mostly positively by critics in the days surrounding its release. On the review aggregator website Rotten Tomatoes, 71% of 14 critics' reviews are positive, with an average rating of 6.9/10. The meta, mockumentary-like structure of the film was hailed for its uniqueness, with Saibal Chatterjee of NDTV declaring it "Hindi Cinema's Halley's Comet". Kapoor's and Kashyap's acting were also well received; the former was particularly praised, with Bollywood Hungama calling it "one of the finest performances of his career" and Tanul Thakur of The Wire describing him as "raw, real, searing". However, the final scenes and the ending twist were considered to be rather disappointing; Anupama Chopra of Film Companion stated "like so many meta movies, it eventually trips on its own cleverness and hits a dead end." Some critics remarked that its release timing helped; giving the film four stars out of five, Mike McCahill of The Guardian called the film a "postmodern surprise" in an "undistinguished pandemic year [for] Indian cinema", while Rahul Desai of Film Companion felt that its 2020 release "elevates the cheeky Netflix thriller into the realms of profound social messaging". In a more mixed review, Rajpal opined that the "meta" format set back the film, and also criticised its editing and pacing.

In an interview, Motwane said "We weren't making a comment intentionally [...] the aim was also to set the film up for an audience that is not voyeuristic about the industry". However, multiple reviewers explored the film's use of inside information on the reputations of the main actors and Bollywood in general, as well as broader questions about the roles and expectations of the film industry. The tussle between the two main characters has been perceived as a proxy for the conflict between established personalities with a history of nepotism, such as Kapoor, a member of the "first family of Indian cinema", and relative outsiders such as Kashyap. One scene, where Kapoor has to dance for the crowd to gain information on where Javed is, was seen by some as commentary on how the public retains power over movie stars by being able to determine their success.

== Controversy ==
The Indian Air Force (IAF) objected to a scene in the film featured in the trailer showing Kapoor cursing while dressed in an inaccurate IAF uniform. Kapoor later stated that the character was only an actor in the role of an IAF officer (Note: In the film, Kapoor was playing himself as an actor that had just finished shooting for the day after portraying an IAF helicopter pilot. Thus, he wears an IAF uniform for most of the film.) and posted a video offering his apology for hurting anyone's sentiments.
