= Manmatha Nath Mukherjee =

Sir Manmatha Mukherjee
- মন্মথনাথ মুখোপাধ্যায়
- Born: Manmatha Nath Mukherjee; 28 October 1874; Nadia district, Bengal, British India
- Died: 6 December 1942 (aged 68); Calcutta, British India
- Education: Albert Collegiate School; Surendranath Law College; Presidency College, Kolkata; University of Calcutta
- Occupation: Justice of Calcutta High Court
- Known for: Juridical contribution Social works

Sir Manmatha Nath Mukherjee (also spelt Mukherji or Mukerji; 28 October 1874 – 6 December 1942) was a Bengali judge of the Calcutta High Court and a distinguished jurist. He was also the Law Member of the Viceroy's Executive Council and awarded Knighthood in 1935. Manmatha Nath was the son-in-law of Bengali scholar Sir Gooroodas Banerjee.

== Early life ==
Manmatha Nath was born in the village of Jagati in Nadia district of undivided Bengal, the son of Unadi Nath Mukherjee. Manmatha Nath received his education at the Albert Collegiate School. After passing entrance examination he joined the Presidency College, Kolkata and completed M.A. He further studied Law in Surendranath Law College (then Ripon College, Calcutta).

== Career ==
In 1924 Mukherjee started work as a junior advocate in Calcutta High Court and uplifted as Judge in 1935. He became popular for some notable, impartial judgements to solve critical disputes such as Tarakeswar Temple case. He also became a Bengali Law Member of the Viceroy's Executive Council, President of the Calcutta Literary Society, Since 1926 and President of the Indian Research Institute. After retirement Mukherjee started practice law in Patna High Court and social works, organized anti communal campaign in Bengal. He Inaugurated the Mandir building of New Delhi Kali Bari. Government of India appointed him as Law Secretary for few days considering the outstanding legal knowledge of Mukherjee. He wrote few books on Law.

== Awards ==
In 1935, Mukherjee was knighted. For his exceptional contribution in legal arena, Nabadwip Bangabibudhajanani Sabha honoured him 'Nyayranjan', Varanasi Hindu Mahamandal gave the title 'Dharmalankar' and 'Nyadhish' was awarded by Sanskrit college. A road in Kolkata near Sealdah was named after him, Justice Manmatha Mukherjee Row.
