= Anubrata Mondal =

Indian politician

President of Birbhum District Trinamool Congress
- Incumbent
- Assumed office 2009

Convenor of Core Committee of Birbhum District Trinamool Congress
- In office 2025–2026

Personal details
- Born: 1 April 1960 (age 66) Bolpur, Birbhum district, West Bengal, India
- Party: All India Trinamool Congress
- Profession: Politician

Anubrata Mondal (born 1 April 1960), also known as Kesto Mondal, is an Indian politician from West Bengal, who belongs to All India Trinamool Congress. He is known to be a close aide of the former Chief Minister of West Bengal, Mamata Banerjee. He is currently serving as President of Birbhum District Trinamool Congress after getting bail for cattle case from Central Bureau of Investigation and Enforcement Directorate in lack of evidence from Tihar Jail. The National Investigation Agency also tried to nab him on national treasure (coal, sand, etc.) smuggling but failed. Due to this his daughter Sukanya Mondal had also spent 16 months in Tihar but nothing could be proven and she was bailed out.

== Controversies ==
On 11 August 2022, he was arrested by Central Bureau of Investigation after interrogation in West Bengal for smuggling cows. The Central Investigation Agency claims that apart from the ₹48.06 crore, they have found property worth ₹29 crore 50 lakh from cow smuggling since last December. So far, the ED has found property worth 77.56 crore rupees gained from cow smuggling money. On 12 August 2022, he was brought to Kolkata from Asansol after presenting him in the court. On 7 March 2023, the ED took him to Delhi for interrogation. Anubrata was sent to Tihar Jail on 21 March 2023. He was bailed on 30 july 2024.

On 30 May 2025, an audio conversation between Anubrata Mondal and Bolpur Police Station IC Liton Halder has been leaked, in which he is heard attacking the police officer, making abusive remarks to the officer’s wife and mother in clearly inaudible language. Anubrata initially denied the authenticity of the audio, but later practically admitted it in a letter sent to the party's state president. On 31 May 2025, a letter written by Mondal has become a subject of mockery. Though the intention was to apologise to police officials, the language and spelling used in the letter have turned it into a laughingstock. Linguists have remarked that such a distortion of the Bengali language is rarely seen.
