= Sonu Punjaban =

Indian convicted sex trafficker

- Born: Geeta Arora; 1981 (age 44–45)
- Spouse: Vijay Singh (d.2003)
- Children: 1
- Status: Imprisoned at Tihar Jail
- Conviction: Sex Trafficking
- Penalty: 24 years imprisonment

Geeta Arora, also known as Sonu Punjaban, is an Indian convicted sex trafficker who was sentenced to 24 years of imprisonment for trafficking a minor girl.

== Biography ==
Sonu married gangster Vijay Singh in 2003 who was killed in an encounter by Uttar Pradesh Special Task Force soon after their marriage. Then she got involved with Deepak who also killed in encounter by the Assam Police. She then married Deepak's brother Hemant Sonu who was also killed in police encounter in April 2006.

== Arrests ==
Sonu was arrested multiple times, first in 2007 under the sections of Immoral Traffic Prevention Act but soon got bail; then she was arrested once again in 2008 for the same offense. She was then arrested under Maharashtra Control of Organised Crime Act in 2011. She was finally arrested in 2017 and has been in Tihar Jail since then.

== 2020 conviction ==
On 16 July 2020, Sonu was convicted under Protection of Children from Sexual Offences Act for forcefully administering drugs to a minor girl so that she could be sexually exploited. The minor girl had given her statement to the police on 9 February 2014. Additionally, the court sentenced co-accused Sandeep Bedwal to 20 years of imprisonment.

Sonu attempted suicide while still in Tihar Jail, hours after she was convicted. She was hospitalized in Deen Dayal Upadhayay Hospital and was shifted back to the jail when her condition stabilized.
