= Black Warrant (book) =

Book by Sunetra Choudhury

Black Warrant: Confessions of a Tihar Jailer
- First edition
- Author: Sunetra Choudhury; Sunil Gupta
- Language: English
- Genre: Non-fiction; Drama
- Publisher: Roli Books
- Publication date: 7 November 2019
- Publication place: India
- Media type: Print (paperback, hardback)
- Pages: 178
- ISBN: 8194206855

Black Warrant: Confessions of a Tihar Jailer is an Indian 2019 non-fiction book written by journalist Sunetra Choudhury and the former superintendent of Tihar Jail, Sunil Gupta. It traces some of the infamous criminals who served their time in the jail and were hanged. The book was published by Roli Books on 7 November 2019. The book shares controversial confessions of procedural lapses and corruption leading to a travesty of justice. It provides a step forward in a quest to understand the Indian prison system and provides fodder for further research into its corruption and injustices.

== Reception ==
A review in The Financial Express called the book a "racy read" calling it "a must-read if they want a quick tutorial on the history of crime in Delhi in the past four decades."

== Adaptation ==
In June 2020, it was announced that Vikramaditya Motwane will be adapting the book into a web series. The rights are jointly acquired by Motwane's production company Andolan Films and writer-journalist Josy Joseph's Confluence Media.

The series Black Warrant, co-created by Motwane and Satyanshu Singh, released on 10 January 2025 premiering and streaming on Netflix, starring Zahan Kapoor.
