= Tihar Village =

Neighborhood of Delhi in West Delhi, India

Tihar village
- Neighborhood of Delhi
- Location in Delhi, India
- Coordinates: 28.6329415°N 77.1058448°E
- Country: India
- State: Delhi
- District: Central Delhi

Languages
  - Official: Hindi
- Time zone: UTC+5:30 (IST)
- PIN: 110 018
- Planning agency: Municipal Corporation of Delhi

Tihar Village is one of the oldest villages in Delhi.

== See also ==
- Tihar Prisons
