= Kashmiri Gate, Delhi =

Gate in Old Delhi, India

Kashmiri Gate
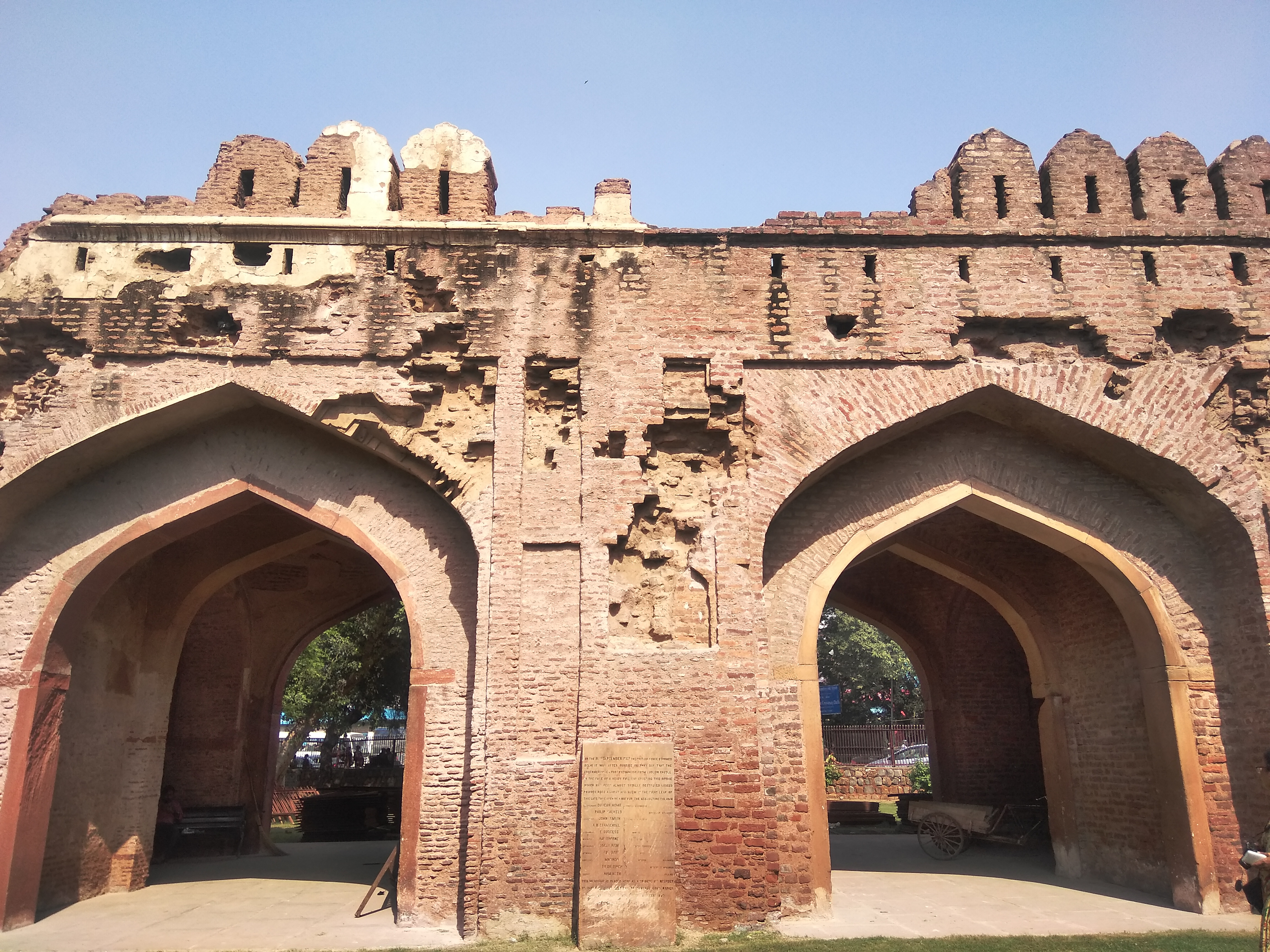
- One of the fourteen gateways of the city of Shahjahanabad
- Interactive map of Kashmiri Gate
- Location: Old Delhi, Delhi
- Coordinates: 28.6666296°N 77.2287938°E
- Type: City gate

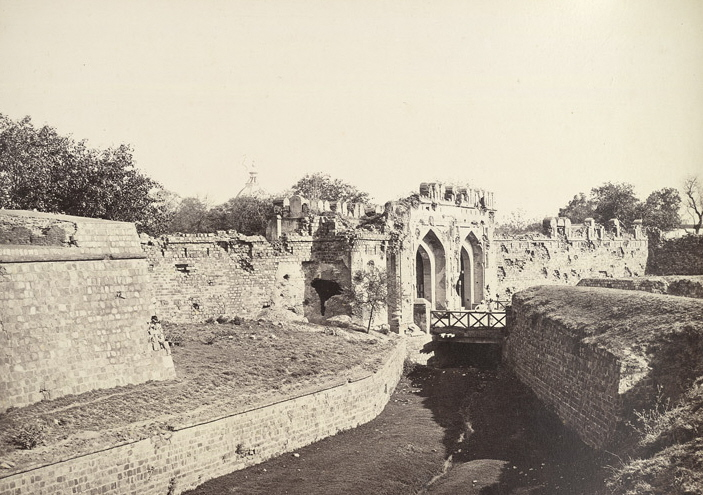
Kashmere Gate, c. 1858

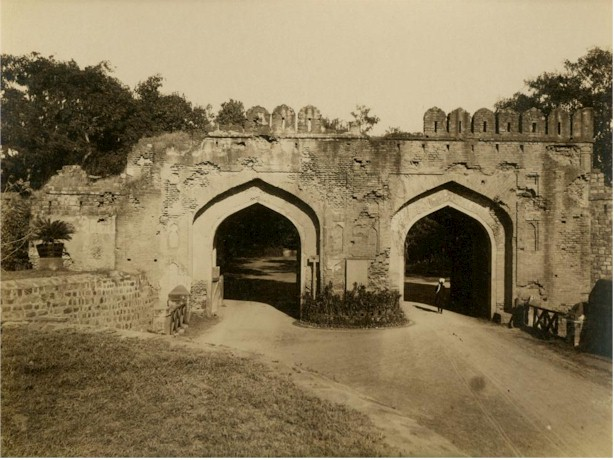
Kashmere Gate, c. 1865

Kashmiri Gate, also spelled Kashmere/Cashmere Gate, is a historic gate located in Old Delhi, Delhi, India. It served as the northern entrance to the walled city of Shahjahanabad, the capital of the Mughal Empire. Built by Mughal Emperor Shah Jahan in the mid-17th century, the gate is named after its proximity to the road that led to Kashmir. It holds historical significance not only for its architectural grandeur but also for its role in key events, including the 1857 Indian Rebellion. Today, Kashmiri Gate is a prominent landmark in Delhi, connecting several major roads and serving as a hub for the city's transportation network.

Kashmiri Gate lends its name to the surrounding locality in North Delhi, situated in the Old Delhi area. It also serves as a significant road junction since it lies in close proximity to important landmarks such as the Red Fort, the Inter-State Bus Terminal (ISBT), and the Delhi Junction railway station.

== History ==
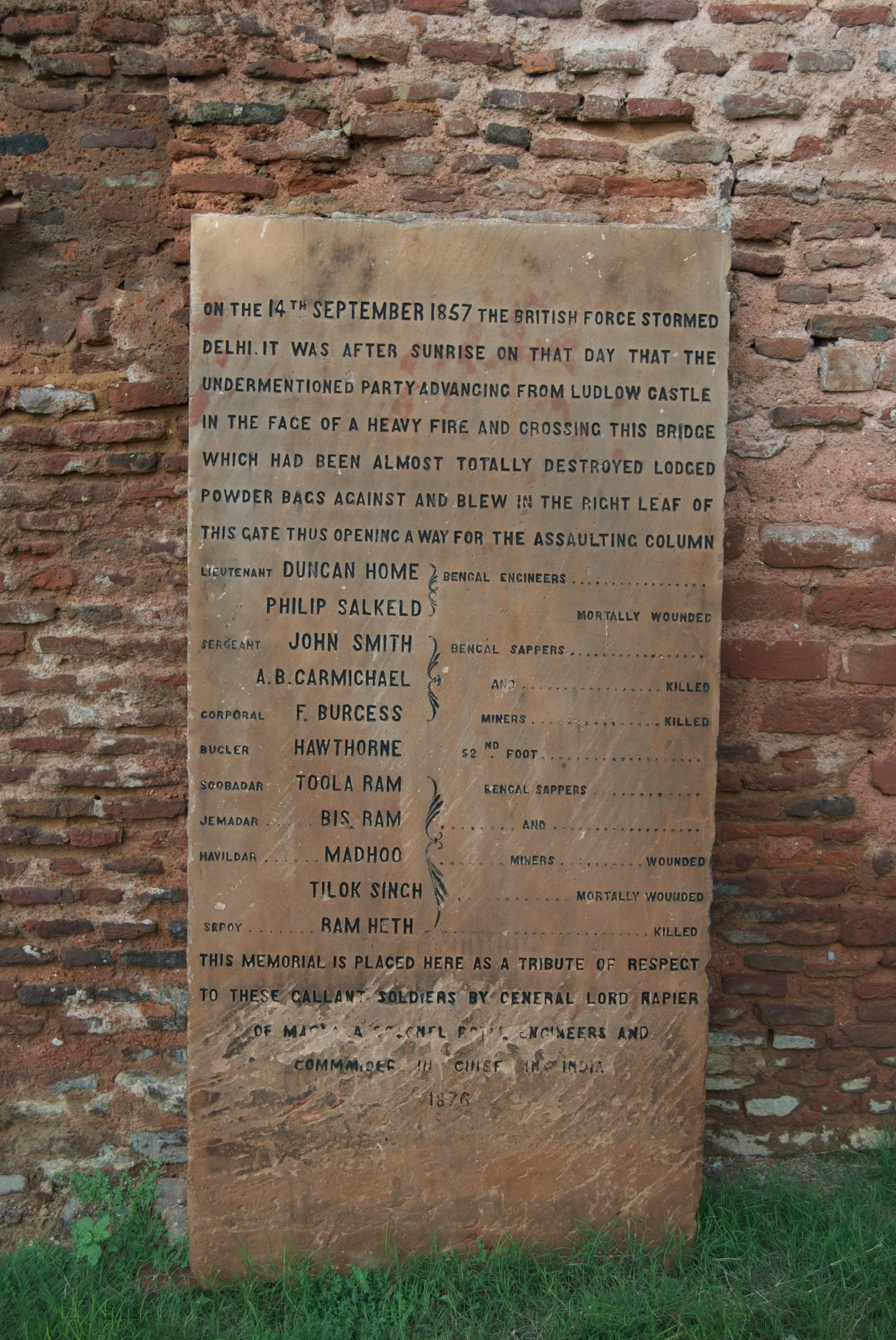
Plaque at Kashmere Gate, commemorating the 14 September 1857 attack on it by British Army during the Indian Rebellion of 1857

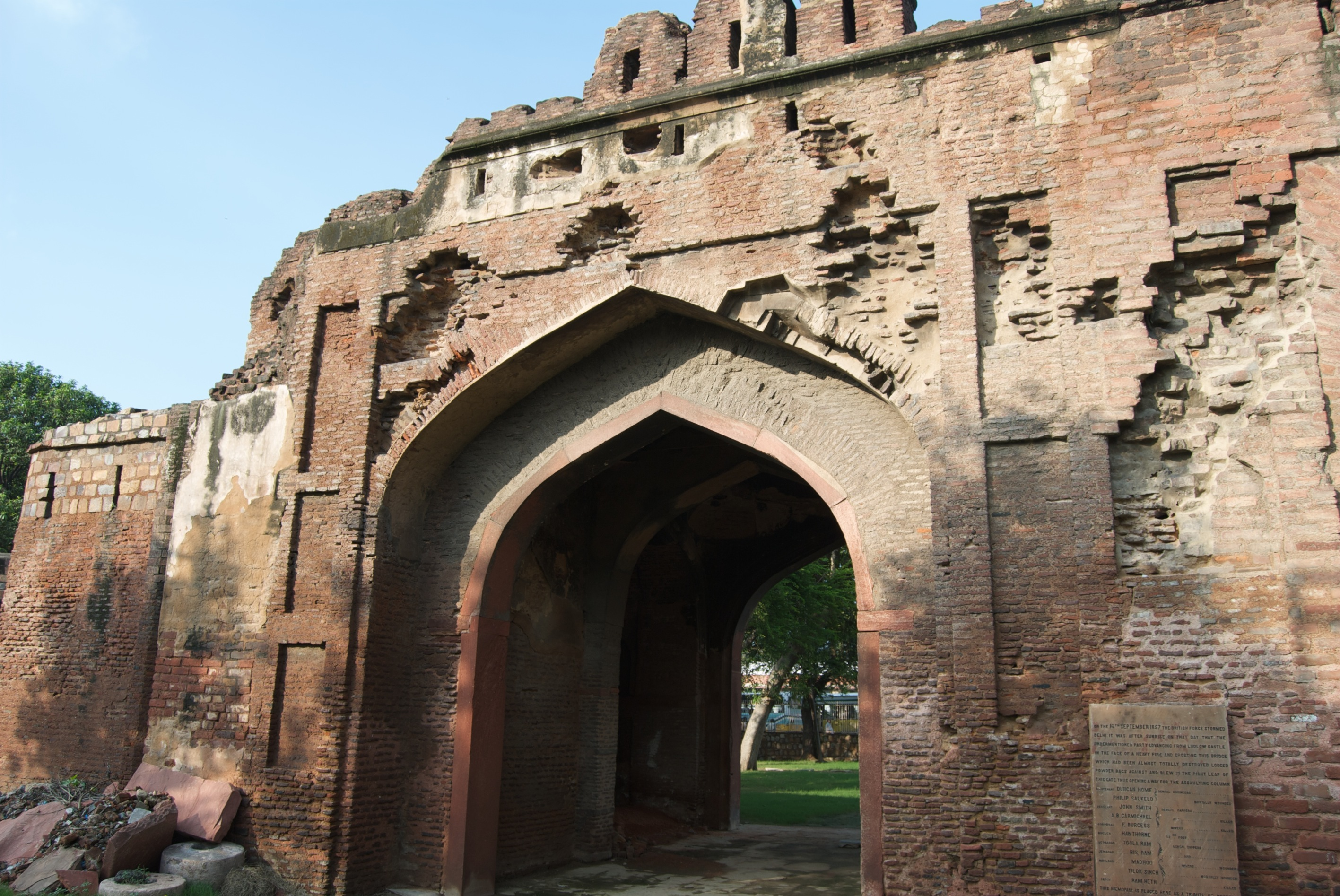
Kashmere Gate in 2008

Kashmiri Gate is located at the northern entrance to the walled city of Shahjahanabad (now referred to as Old Delhi), leading towards the Red Fort, which served as the imperial residence of the Mughal emperor. The gate was named "Kashmere Gate" during the British Raj, as it faced the direction of Kashmir. The monument still stands today, preserving its historical significance. The southern gate of the walled city is known as the Delhi Gate.

When the British first began settling in Delhi in 1803, they found the walls of the Old Delhi city, Shahjahanabad, in disrepair, especially after the siege by Yashwantrao Holkar of the Maratha Confederacy in 1804. In response, the British reinforced the city's walls. Over time, they gradually established their residential estates in the Kashmiri Gate area, which had once been home to Mughal palaces and the residences of nobility. The Kashmiri Gate amassed national attention during the Mutiny of 1857, when it became a key site of resistance. Rebelling soldiers fired volleys of cannonballs from the gate at the British forces and used the area to assemble and strategise their fight against colonial rule. The gate played a pivotal role in the uprising, symbolising the resistance and resilience of Indian soldiers during this significant historical event.

At the onset of the Indian Rebellion of 1857, the British used Kashmiri Gate to prevent the mutineers from entering the city. Efforts, however, floundered.

Evidence of the successive assaults mounted by British forces to storm the city can still be witnessed in the damage to the existing walls, likely caused by cannonballs. On the morning of 14 September 1857, Kashmiri Gate was the site of a significant British assault. The British Army destroyed the bridge and the left leaf of the gate using gunpowder, marking the beginning of the final assault on the rebels towards the end of the Siege of Delhi. The gate itself was stormed by men of 52nd (Oxfordshire) Light Infantry, led by Lt. Col. Kenrick Crosse, on 14 September 1857. Crosse was the first man through the gate to liberate the city from the mutineers. Bugler Robert Hawthorne was awarded the Victoria Cross for his heroism during the engagement.

After the 1857 rebellion, the British moved to Civil Lines, and Kashmiri Gate assumed a distinction as the fashion and commercial center of Delhi, a status it held until the creation of New Delhi in 1931. In 1965, a section of the gate was demolished to facilitate faster vehicular traffic movement. Since then, Kashmiri Gate has been preserved as a protected monument under the Archaeological Survey of India.

In the early 1910s, employees of the Government of India Press settled around Kashmiri Gate, including a sizable Bengali community. This community established the Delhi Durga Puja Samiti in 1910, which organised the first Durga Puja celebration in the area. Today, it is the oldest Durga Puja celebration in Delhi.

The building housing the Delhi State Election Commission's office, located on Lothian Road near Kashmiri Gate, was constructed between 1890 and 1891. From 1891 until 1941, it housed St. Stephen's College, Delhi, before the college moved to its present location in the University Enclave. During the Partition of India in 1947, Kashmiri Gate served as a refugee camp for people who had migrated from West Punjab and the North-West Frontier Province.

Between 2016 and 2017, Kashmiri Gate was listed by the United States Trade Representative (USTR) as a notorious market for selling counterfeit auto parts.

== St. James' Church ==
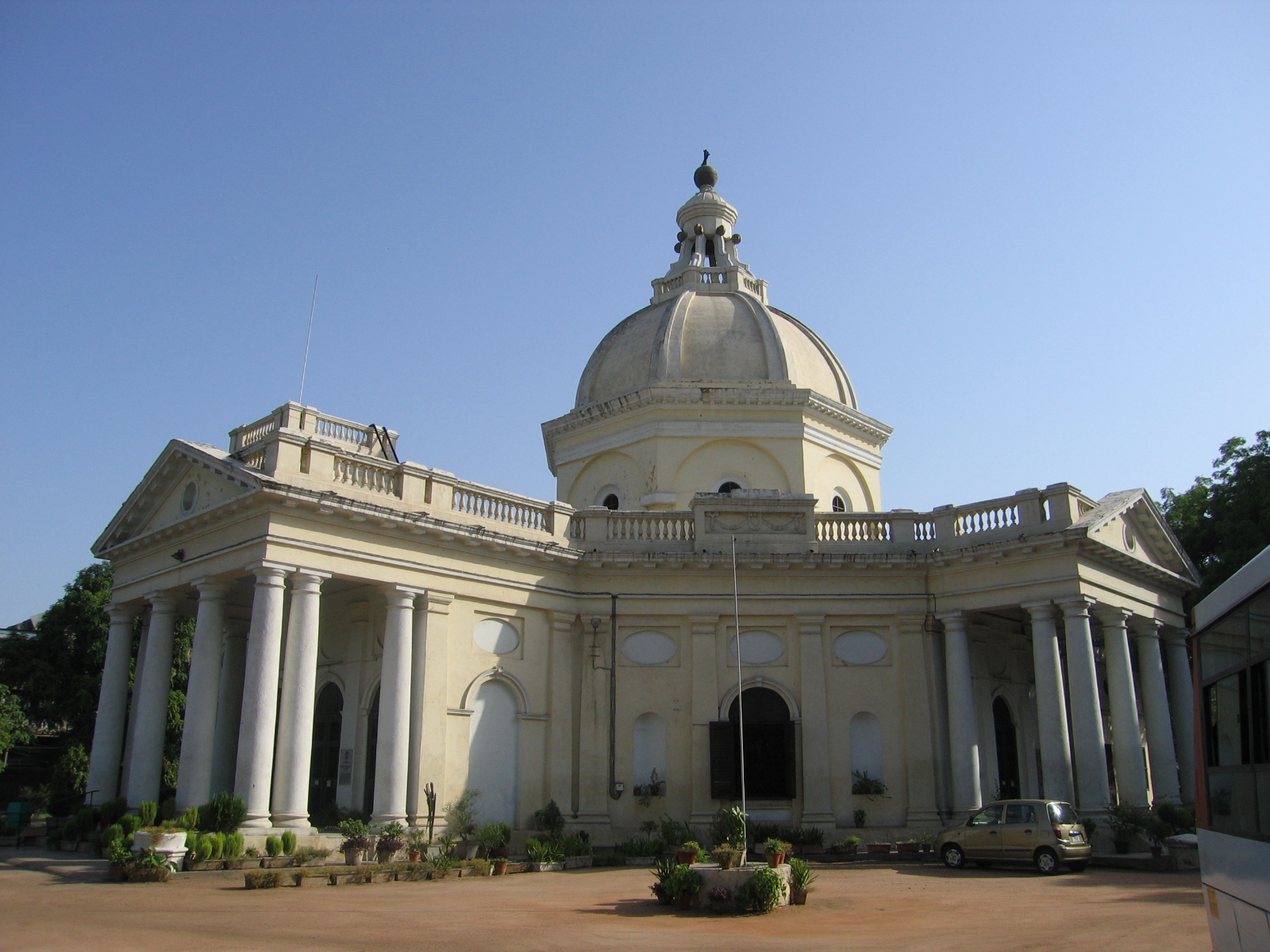
St. James' Church or Skinner's Church, Kashmere Gate, Delhi

St. James Church, also known as Skinner's Church, was commissioned by Colonel James Skinner (1778–1841), a renowned Anglo-Indian military officer who founded and led the eponymous cavalry regiment, Skinner's Horse. The church was designed by Major Robert Smith and constructed between 1826 and 1836.

== ISBT ==
The Maharana Pratap Inter-state Bus Terminus or ISBT is the oldest and one of the largest Inter State Bus Terminals in India, operating bus services between Delhi and seven states: Haryana, Jammu & Kashmir, Punjab, Himachal Pradesh, Uttar Pradesh, Rajasthan and Uttarakhand. It opened in 1976.

== Metro Station ==
The Kashmere Gate station of the Delhi Metro lies on the only trijunction of the Delhi Metro network: the Red, Yellow, and Violet lines converge at this station.

== Dara Shikoh Library ==
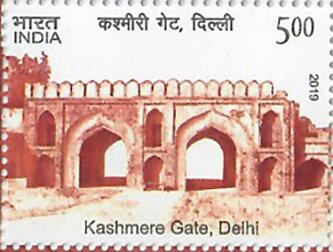
Stamp of India, 2019, depicting Kashmere Gate, Delhi, from the "Historic Gates of Indian Forts and Monuments" series.

A library established by Mughal prince Dara Shikoh, the elder brother of Emperor Aurangzeb, still exists in Kashmiri Gate. It is currently administered as an archaeological museum by the Archaeological Survey of India.

== Historic sites ==
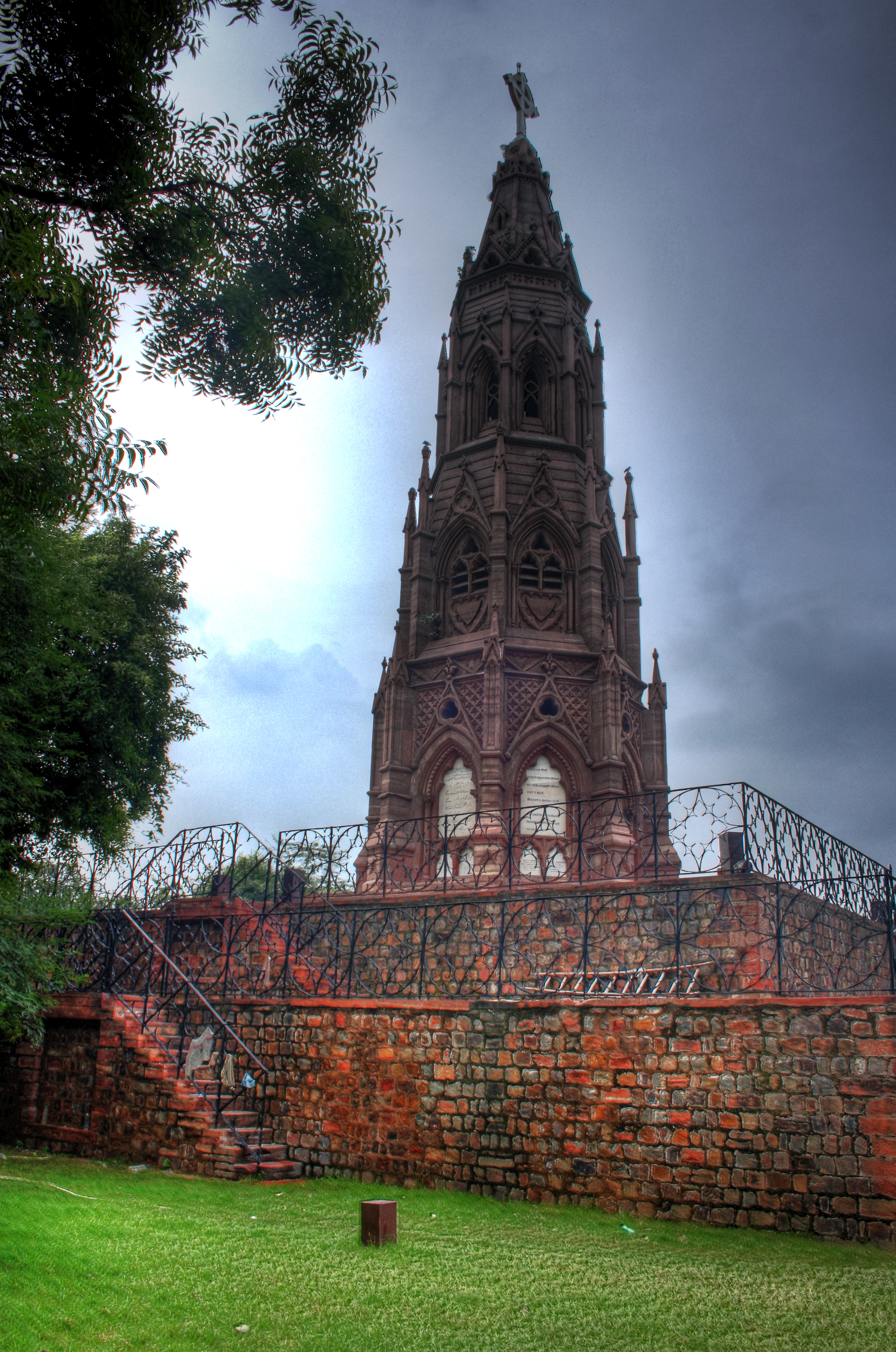
Mutiny Memorial, erected in 1863, commemorates the officers and soldiers, both British and native, of the Delhi Field Force who were killed during the 1857 rebellion

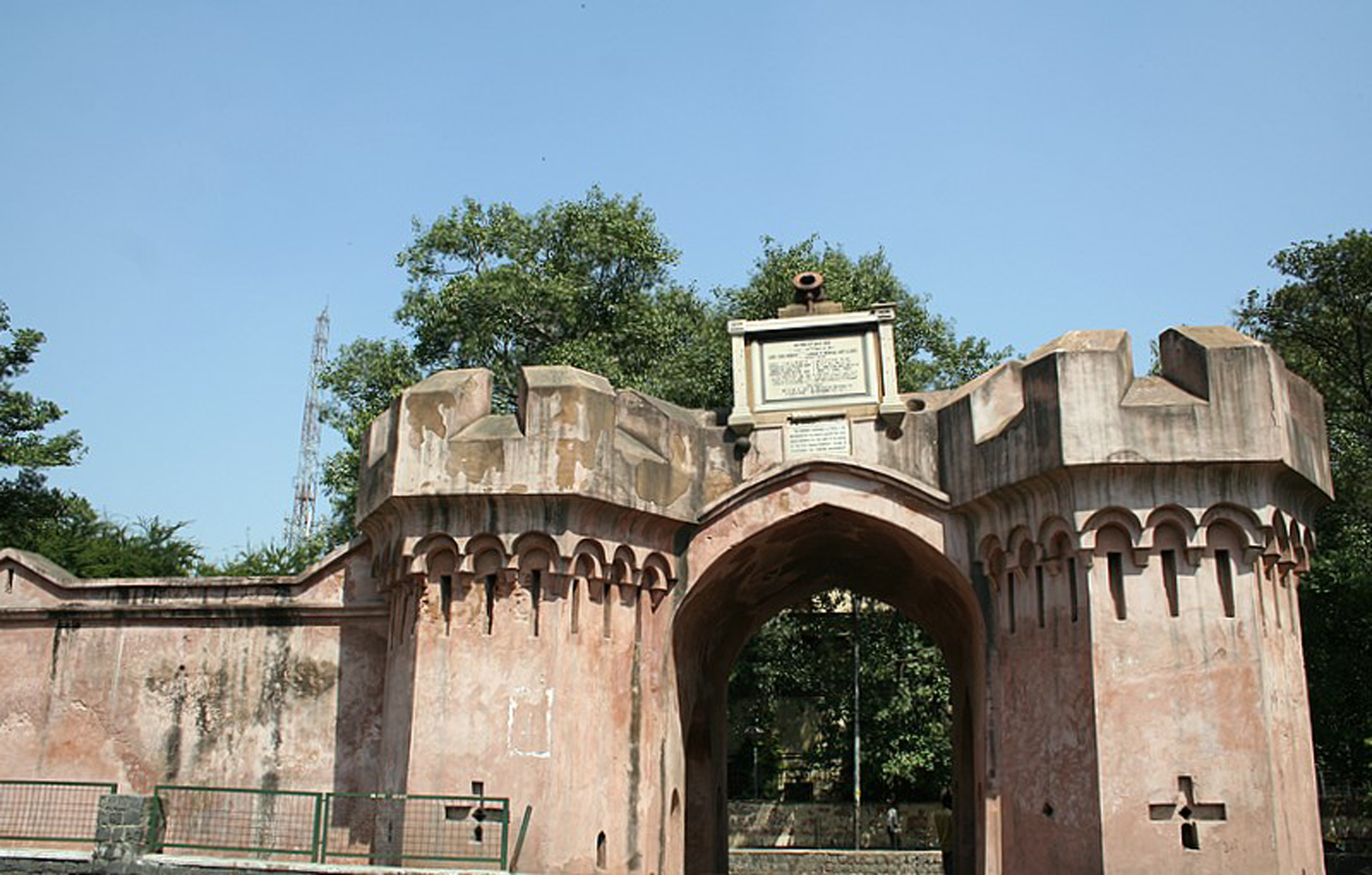
One of the two remaining Magazine Gateways, marking the site of old magazines blown up during the 1857 Mutiny, located south of the Kashmere Gate Post Office

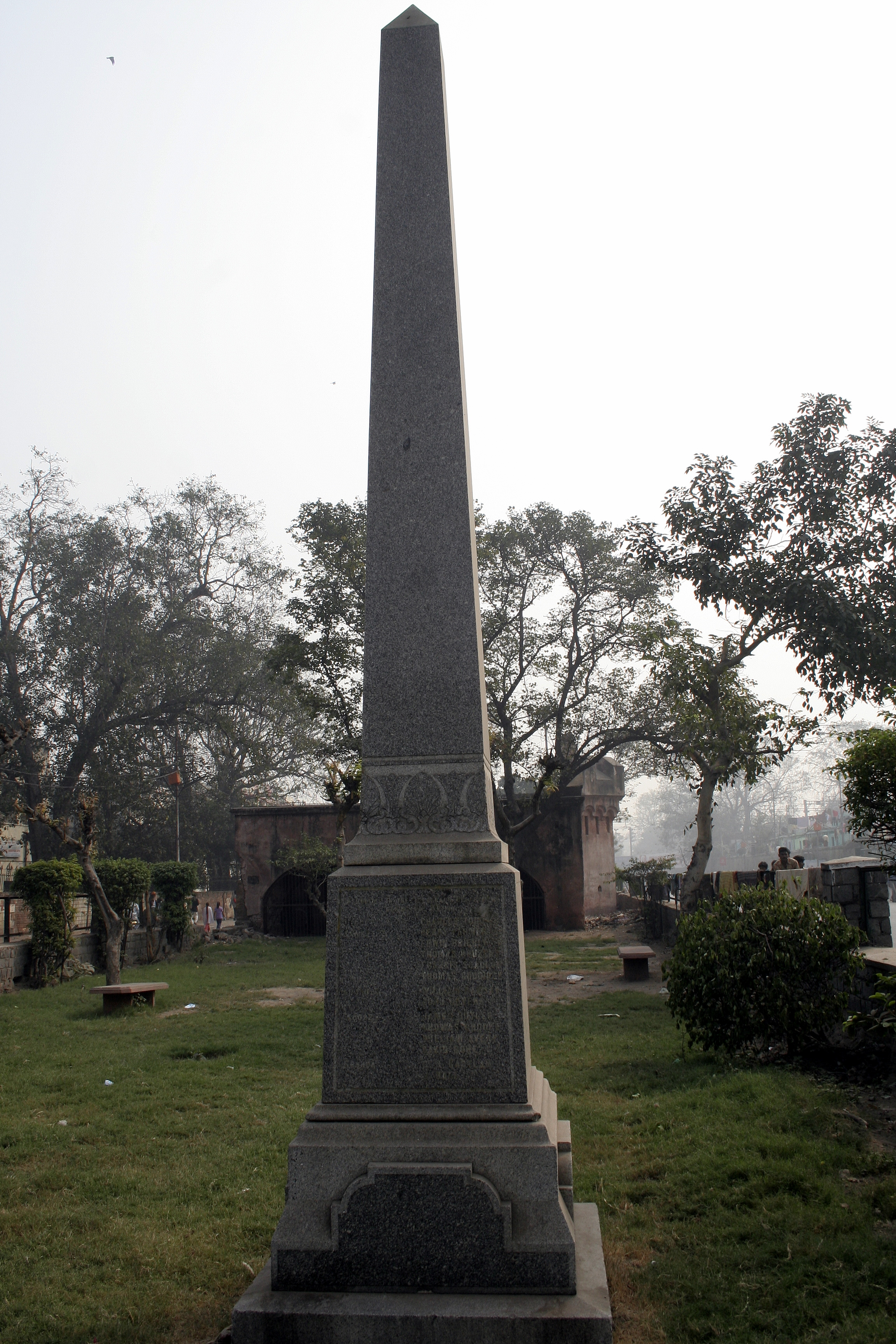
Telegraph Memorial, erected in 1901-02 to honour the postal & telegraph service personnel who died in 1857

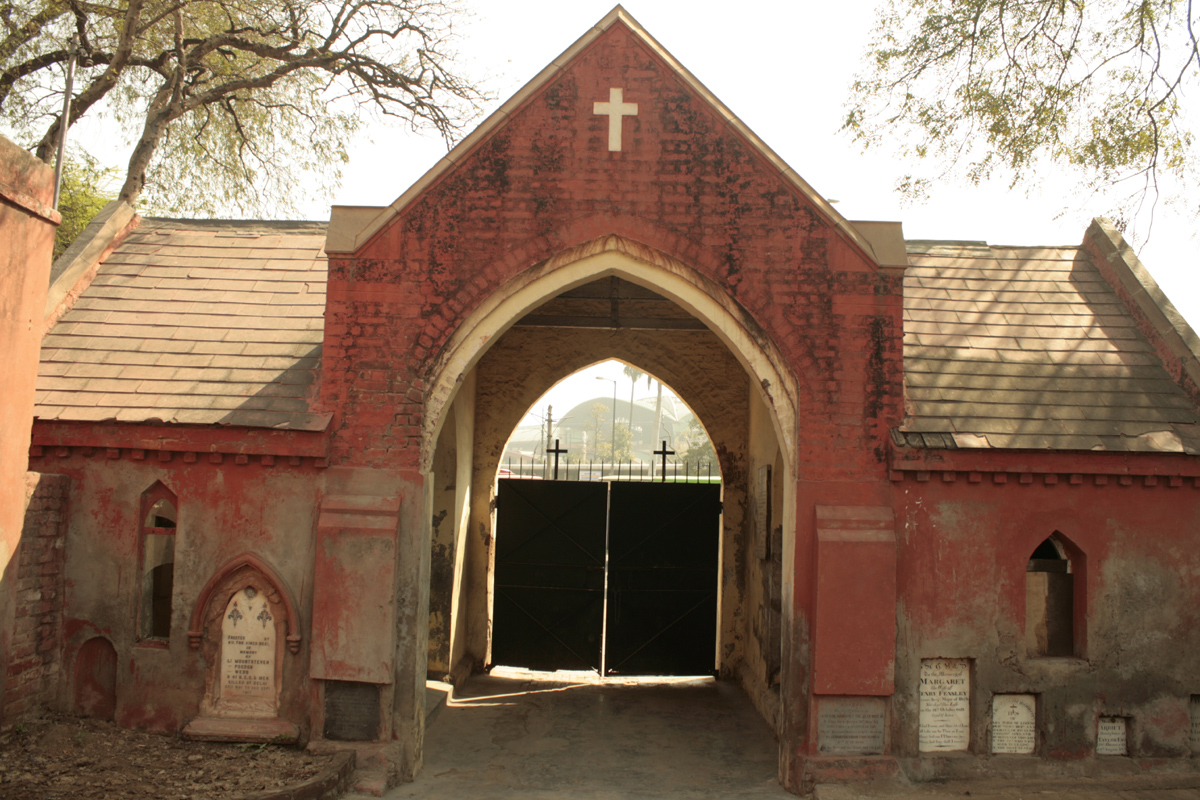
Entrance to the Nicholson Cemetery, named after Brigadier General John Nicholson, a British hero who witnessed combat during the 1857 Mutiny

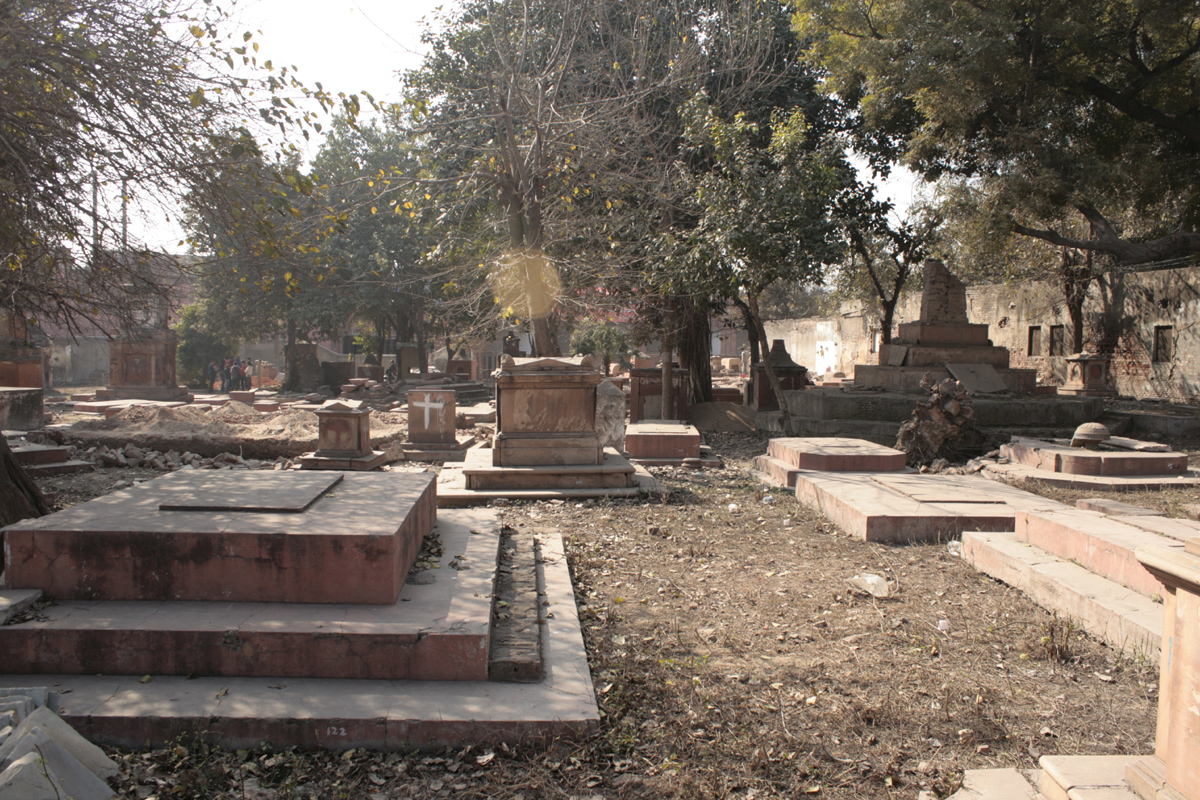
Lothian Cemetery

== Historical institutions ==
Madrasa Aminia, established in 1897 by Amin al-Dehlawi, is one of the historical Islamic institutions in Kashmiri Gate.

== See also ==
- Khooni Darwaza, an imposing gate constructed by Sher Shah Suri
- Delhi Gate, the southern gate of the historic Walled City of Delhi (Shahjahanbad)
