= Tihar Prisons =

Prison centre in Delhi, India

Tihar Jail
- Location in Delhi Location in India
- Location: Tihar Village, New Delhi, India; 28°37′03″N 77°06′02″E
- Status: Operating
- Security class: Maximum
- Capacity: 5,200 (out of total 10,026 of other two jail)
- Population: 14,059 (out of total 20,458 of other two jail) (31 December 2023)
- Opened: 1957; 69 years ago
- Managed by: Department of Delhi Prisons; Government of Delhi
- Website: tiharprisons.delhi.gov.in

Tihar Prisons, popularly known as Tihar Jail, is a prison complex in India and is one of the largest complexes of prisons in India. There are 9 functional prisons spread over more than 400 acres. Run by Department of Delhi Prisons, the prison contains nine central prisons, and is one of the three prison complexes in Delhi. The other two prison complexes are at Rohini and Mandoli with one and six central prisons respectively. Tihar prison complex is located in Janakpuri, approximately 3 km from Tihar village in West Delhi.

The prison is styled as a correctional institution. Its main objective is to convert its inmates into ordinary members of society by providing them with useful skills, education, and respect for the law. It aims to improve the inmates' self-esteem and strengthen their desire to improve. To engage, rehabilitate, and reform its inmates, Tihar uses music therapy, which involves music training sessions and concerts. The prison has its own radio station, run by inmates. There is also a prison industry within the walls, manned wholly by inmates, which bears the brand Tihar.

== History ==
=== Origin ===
Originally, Tihar was a maximum-security prison run by the State of Punjab. In 1966 control was transferred to the National Capital Territory of Delhi. Beginning in 1984, additional facilities were constructed, and the complex became Tihar Prison, also the largest jail in India.

=== Reforms ===
Under the charge of IPS officer Kiran Bedi, when she was Inspector General of Prisons, she instituted a number of prison reforms at Tihar, including changing its name to Tihar Ashram. She also instituted a Vipassana meditation program for both staff and inmates; initial classes were taught by S. N. Goenka. The prison has also produced an inmate who passed the UPSC civil service examinations.

Many of the inmates continue their higher education through distance education. The campus placement program was launched in 2011 for the rehabilitation of inmates about to complete their sentences. In 2014, a recruitment drive led to 66 inmates selected on the basis of their good conduct, received job offers with salaries up to ₹35,000 (US$370) per month, from as many as 31 recruiters, which included educational institutions, NGOs and private companies.

=== Escapes ===
In 1986, Charles Sobhraj, a French serial killer, threw a big party for his prison guards and fellow inmates, drugged them with sleeping pills and walked out of the Tihar prison in March.

In 2004, Sher Singh Rana, who had been arrested for the murder of Phoolan Devi in 2001, escaped from Tihar jail in February. He was arrested again in 2006, in Kolkata.

In 2015, two prisoners who were waiting for their trial in Tihar jail escaped through a tunnel in June.

== Jail factory ==
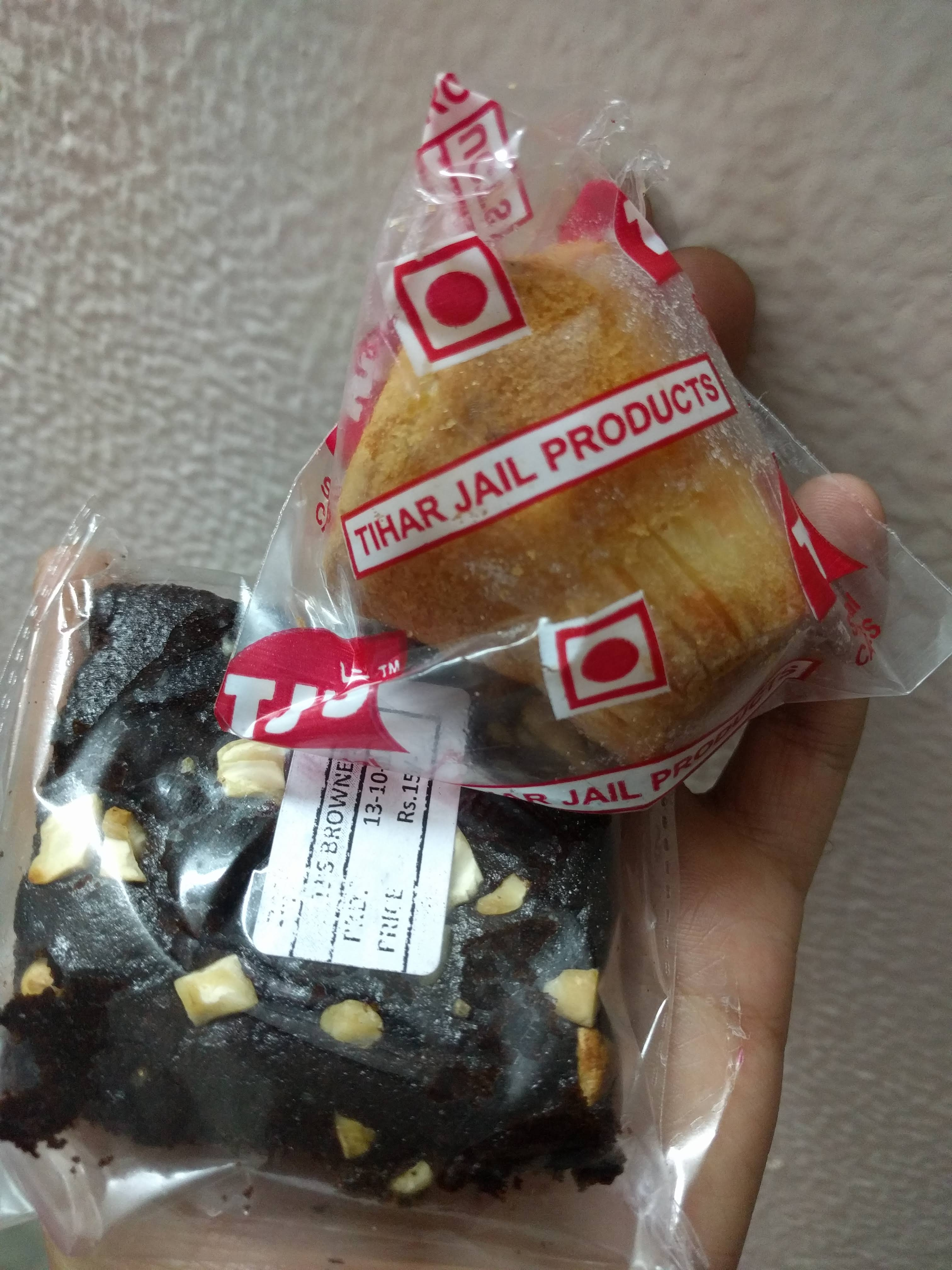
Tihar Jail muffin and brownie.

In 1961, the Jail Factory was established in Central Jail No. 2 at Tihar. Over the years, its activities have expanded to include carpentry, weaving (handloom & powerloom), tailoring, chemicals, handmade paper, commercial art, and baking. Later, in 2009, a shoe manufacturing unit was established using the Public-Private Partnership model, and thus, the brand TJ's was launched. As of May 2014, 700 inmates work in these units, and 25% of their earnings are deposited in the Victim Welfare Fund, which provides compensation to the victims and their families. A CSR initiative has been launched to provide a Level 4 training program comprising 340 hours of coursework to 1,200 inmates from the National Council for Vocational Training (NCVT) to empower inmates for a productive post-release life, as a step toward the rehabilitation of undertrials incarcerated for minor offences.

== Notable prisoners ==
=== Politicians ===
- Arvind Kejriwal —Arrest of Arvind Kejriwal due to 2022 Delhi liquor policy case
- Amar Singh — former member of the Samajwadi Party, arrested in a cash-for-votes scandal
- Anubrata Mondal — Indian politician accused of cow smuggling
- Anca Verma — wife of Abhishek Verma, co-accused in all his corruption cases
- 2G spectrum case accused, including A. Raja, Kanimozhi, Vinod Goenka, Shahid Balwa, and Sanjay Chandra
- Chandrashekhar Azad, an Indian politician
- 2022 Delhi liquor policy case accused, including K. Kavitha, Manish Sisodia, Satyendra Kumar Jain, and Sanjay Singh
- D. K. Shivakumar — former Minister in Karnataka Govt., sent to prison in money laundering case.
- Kanhaiya Kumar
- Lalu Prasad Yadav — former Union Minister of Railways, former Chief Minister of Bihar, incarcerated for the Fodder Scam
- P. Chidambaram — former Union Minister of Finance, Judicial custody in relation to the INX media Corruption case.
- Ripun Bora — education minister of Assam's Tarun Gogoi-led Congressional government, the main suspect in the Daniel Topno murder case, was arrested by CBI officials on 3 June 2008 and sent to Tihar on 7 June 2008
- Sanjay Gandhi — former Member of Parliament and son of Indira Gandhi
- Suresh Kalmadi — former president of the Indian Olympic Association, who was arrested for alleged corruption regarding the 2010 Commonwealth Games
- Bangaru Laxman- The former BJP national president was taken into custody and convicted in 2012 by a Delhi court in a Tehelka sting operation bribery case.
- Emergency Era Leaders (1975–1977): During the Indian Emergency, senior Jan Sangh and BJP figures—including Atal Bihari Vajpayee, L.K. Advani, and Arun Jaitley—were detained and held in Delhi's Tihar Jail.

=== Gangsters and criminals ===
- Charles Sobhraj — an international serial killer, secretly escaped from Tihar on 16 March 1986, but was recaptured shortly thereafter, returned to the prison and sentenced to an additional ten years for the escape. He was released and deported upon the completion of his term on 17 February 1997.
- Chhota Rajan — Mumbai-based gangster
- Lawrence Bishnoi, Indian gangster
- Sonu Punjaban, Indian pimp

=== Rapists ===
- 2012 Delhi gang rape accused; Ram Singh (died by suicide in March 2013), Mukesh Singh, Akshay Thakur, Pawan Gupta and Vinay Sharma; four surviving convicts executed on 20 March 2020
- Geeta and Sanjay Chopra kidnapping case accused - Kuljeet Singh and Jasbir Singh — executed in 1982

=== Terrorism and anti-nationalism ===
Following convicts and/or under-trial accused of terrorism and/or anti-nationalism:

- Abhishek Verma — accused in Navy War Room Leak case & Scorpene Submarines deal.
- Afzal Guru — Kashmiri separatist and Jaish-e-Mohammed terrorist involved in the 2001 Indian Parliament attack, who was executed on 9 February 2013
- Asif Iqbal Tanha
- Erappungal Abubacker, anti-national activities done under banned Popular Front of India organization.
- Jagtar Singh Hawara and Paramjit Singh Bheora, Khalistani militants, main accused in the assassination of Punjab Chief minister Beant Singh
- Jagtar Singh Johal — accused in 2016–17 targeted killings in Punjab, India
- Maqbool Bhat — Kashmiri separatist and convicted terrorist
- Saquib Nachan, Indian terrorist
- Satwant Singh and Kehar Singh — security guards, hanged for the assassination of Indira Gandhi
- Umar Khalid

=== Sports person ===
- Milkha Singh — former Indian sprinter, for travelling in a train without ticket.
- Sushil Kumar — Indian wrestler, arrested in connection with the murder of a 23-year-old wrestler at Chhatrasal Stadium

=== Others ===
- Abhijit Banerjee — Indian born American Nobel laureate. While studying at Jawaharlal Nehru University (JNU), he was arrested and imprisoned in Tihar Jail for protesting against JNU's vice-chancellor
- Anna Hazare - Indian social activists fighting against corruption, were imprisoned in Tihar for protesting conflicts between differing Civil Society and UPA Government anti-corruption bills, known as the Jan Lokpal Bill and the Lokpal Bill, respectively
- Subrata Roy — founder of Sahara India Pariwar
- Sudhir Chaudhary — Indian journalist sent to 14-day judicial custody but was later released on bail in extortion case

== Issues ==
=== HIV ===
The prison complex has no facilities for keeping paraplegic pre-trial inmates or convicts. The Integrated Counseling and Testing Centre reports that around 6% to 8% of the 11,800 Tihar inmates are HIV-positive, which is considerably higher than the HIV rate among the general population in India.

=== Overcrowding ===
As of December 2023, Tihar jail has 14,059 inmates against the sanctioned capacity of 5,200. The prison population as of 31 December 2023 has increased by double in comparison to the population as of 31 December 2018.

== In popular culture ==
- Black Warrant, non-fiction book about prisoners in the jail
- Black Warrant (2025) Netflix Series is based on the story Sunil Gupta, a Tihar jailer, and included notable events such as the execution of Ranga Billa and Maqbool Bhat.
- Doing Time, Doing Vipassana (1997) documentary about the introduction of S. N. Goenka's 10-day Vipassana classes at Tihar Jail in 1993 by then Inspector General of Prisons in New Delhi, Kiran Bedi. Bedi had her guards trained in Vipassana first, and then she had Goenka give his initial class to 1,000 prisoners.
- Jailer (2023), Rajinikanth is shown as Tihar Jailer "Tiger" Muthuvel "Muthu" Pandian in this film.

== See also ==
- Crime in India
- National Crime Records Bureau
