= Sunetra Choudhury =

TV journalist

Sunetra Choudhury is a journalist and anchor with The Hindustan Times. Her career started with The Indian Express in 1999 where she became the deputy chief reporter. In 2002, she began her TV career with Star News. Later, she moved to NDTV in 2003. Primarily located in New Delhi, she is an alumna of the Indian Institute of Mass Communication.

== Career ==
Choudhury started her career with the newspaper The Indian Express in 1999 and became the Deputy Chief Reporter responsible for their city section Newsline. In 2002, she entered the electronic media industry when she joined STAR News as a reporter in Hindi. In 2003, she joined the New Delhi based NDTV. On 30 April 2019, she announced that she has quit NDTV. On 1 May 2019, she joined Hindustan Times. She has been an anchor and reporter covering everything from natural disasters to crime, investigations and politics.

=== 2010 ===
In 2010, Hachette India published a book authored by her, named Braking News. The book is set two months before the general elections in May 2009. Choudhury, along with her colleague Naghma Sahar trundled the bylanes and boondocks of India in search of the elusive Indian voter, and an insight into his mind. They went to villages without electricity in UP, to tribal settlements in Jharkhand, to Baripada in Odisha and Kanchipuram in Tamil Nadu. They carried out a daily show called the Election Express, that spoke one on one with the locals and tried to understand the issues that determined their lives. Primarily being an election travelogue, she mentions:

Part travelogue, part election special, part candid confessions of an inveterate TV cameratime junkie, this book is a delightfully frank account of one woman's understanding of why the country voted as it did; and how obvious it is, once out of the larger cities that development is the ultimate votegetter....

=== 2011 ===
In 2011, she reported facing an awkward harassment situation from a senior politician.

In 2015, she received the Red Ink Award for her story on how disabled children were being adopted by Indian families for the very first time.

=== 2019 ===
On 10 November 2019, Roli Books published the book Black Warrant, which was co-authored by Sunetra Chaudhury and Sunil Gupta.

== Bibliography ==
- Breaking News (2010)
- Behind Bars: Prison Tales of India's Most Famous (2017)
- Black Warrant (2019)
