= Vikramaditya Motwane =

Indian filmmaker (born 1976)

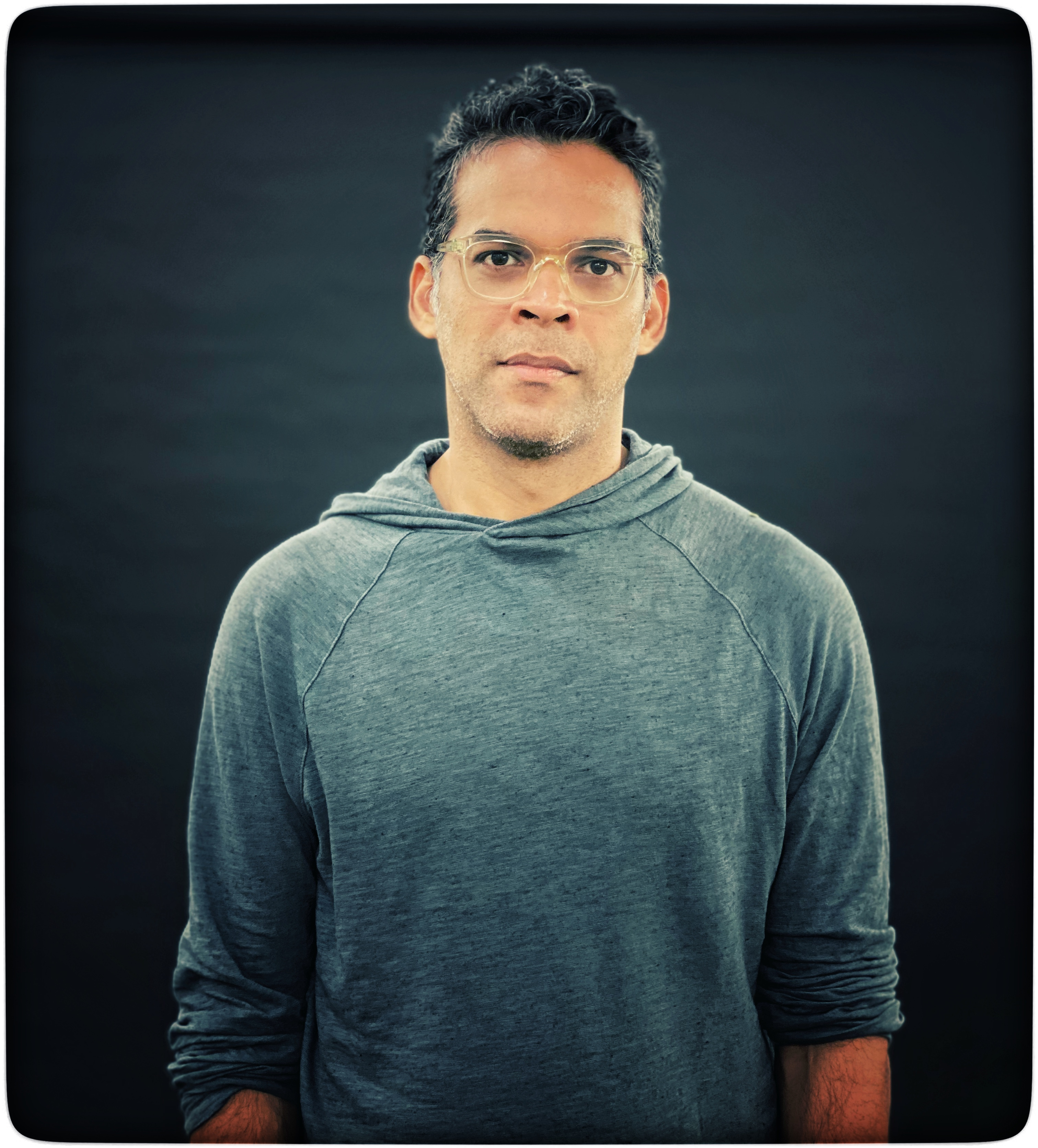
- Motwane in 2020
- Born: 6 December 1976 (age 49); Mumbai, Maharashtra, India
- Occupations: Director; producer; screenwriter
- Years active: 1999–present
- Spouse: Ishika Mohan Motwane (m. 2005)
- Children: 1

Vikramaditya Motwane (born 6 December 1976) is an Indian filmmaker who works in Hindi films and series. His directorial debut Udaan (2010) was selected to compete in the Un Certain Regard category at the 2010 Cannes Film Festival and also won seven Filmfare Awards.

Motwane has since directed the period romance Lootera (2013), the survival drama Trapped (2017), the superhero film Bhavesh Joshi Superhero (2018), and the thrillers AK vs AK (2020) and CTRL (2024). He has also produced several films, including Queen (2014) and Udta Punjab (2016). In addition, Motwane has served as creator and director on the streaming series Sacred Games (2018–2019), Jubilee (2023), and Black Warrant (2025).

== Early and personal life ==
His father is Sindhi Hindu while his mother is Bengali Hindu. He is married to photographer Ishika Mohan, who appeared in his debut, Udaan, as Rohan's mother.

== Career ==
Motwane was a long-time assistant of Sanjay Leela Bhansali, and collaborated with Bhansali on the films Hum Dil De Chuke Sanam (1999) and Devdas (2002). He directed the song sequences in Anurag Kashyap's unreleased film Paanch (2003) and was Choreographer on Deepa Mehta's Academy Award-nominated film Water (2005).

Motwane released his debut feature film, entitled Udaan (2010), for Anurag Kashyap's production house, Anurag Kashyap Films, on 16 July 2010, which won seven Filmfare awards including Filmfare critics award for best movie and also won him the Best Director Award at the 2011 Star Screen Awards.

Motwane's second film, a period romance called Lootera, was released on 5 July 2013.

Motwane's third film was a survival drama called Trapped. The film had its world premiere at the Mumbai Film Festival on 26 October 2016, where it was praised and received a Standing ovation. The film was released theatrically on 17 March 2017 to universal critical acclaim. The movie also won the award for 'Best Asian Film' by Neuchâtel International Fantastic Film Festival in 2017.

Motwane created American streaming company Netflix's first Indian series 'Sacred Games', based on the novel of the same name by Vikram Chandra and directed it along with Anurag Kashyap. The series was met with critical acclaim and Netflix then commissioned a second season for it later.

Motwane was co-owner of Phantom Films, a film production company, with Vikas Bahl, Anurag Kashyap, and Madhu Mantena that dissolved in 2018.

In June 2020, it was announced that Motwane will be adapting the 2019 non-fiction book Black Warrant into a web series. The rights are jointly acquired by his production company Andolan Films and writer-journalist Josy Joseph's Confluence Media.

== Filmography ==
=== Film ===
Year	Title	Director	Producer	Writer	Notes
2006	Undisputed	Yes			Short film
2007	Goal			Yes	
2009	Dev.D			Yes	
2010	Udaan	Yes		Yes	
2013	Lootera	Yes	Yes	Yes	
2014	Hasee Toh Phasee		Yes		
2014	Queen		Yes		
2014	Ugly		Yes		
2015	NH10		Yes		
2015	Masaan		Yes		
2015	Hunterrr		Yes		
2015	Bombay Velvet		Yes		
2015	Shaandaar		Yes		
2016	Wrong Side Raju		Yes		
2016	Udta Punjab		Yes		
2016	Raman Raghav 2.0		Yes		
2017	Trapped	Yes	Yes		
2018	Mukkabaaz		Yes		
2018	High Jack		Yes		
2018	Bhavesh Joshi Superhero	Yes	Yes	Yes	
2018	Manmarziyaan		Yes		
2019	The Booth		Yes		Short film
2020	Awake		Yes		Short film
2020	Cargo		Yes		Executive producer
2020	AK vs AK	Yes	Yes	Yes	
2021	2024		Yes		
2023	Indi(r)a's Emergency	Yes			Documentary
2024	CTRL	Yes	Yes	Yes	
2026	Lust Stories 3	Yes			Anthology Netflix film

=== Television ===
Year	Title	Functioned as				Notes
Year	Title	Creator	Executive producer	Director	Writer	Notes
2018–2019	Sacred Games	Yes	Yes	Yes	No	
2018	Ghoul	No	Yes	No	No	
2021	Decoupled	No	Yes	No	No	
2023	Jubilee	Yes	Yes	Yes	No	Co-created with Soumik Sen
2025	Black Warrant	Yes	Yes	Yes	No	Co-created with Satyanshu Singh

== Awards ==
Year	Award	Category	Film
2014	National Film Awards	Best Feature Film in Hindi	Queen
2011	Filmfare Awards	Best Film (Critics)	Udaan
2011	Filmfare Awards	Best Story	Udaan
2011	Filmfare Awards	Best Screenplay	Udaan
2015	Filmfare Awards	Best Film	Queen
2003	IIFA Awards	Best Sound Recording	Dev.D
2015	IIFA Awards	Best Picture	Queen
2011	Star Screen Awards	Best Director	Udaan
2015	Star Screen Awards	Best Film	Queen
2011	Zee Cine Awards	Best Director (Critics)	Udaan
2014	Stardust Awards	Best Film	Queen
2023	2023 Filmfare OTT Awards	Best Director Drama Series	Jubilee
