= Delhi Durga Puja Samiti =

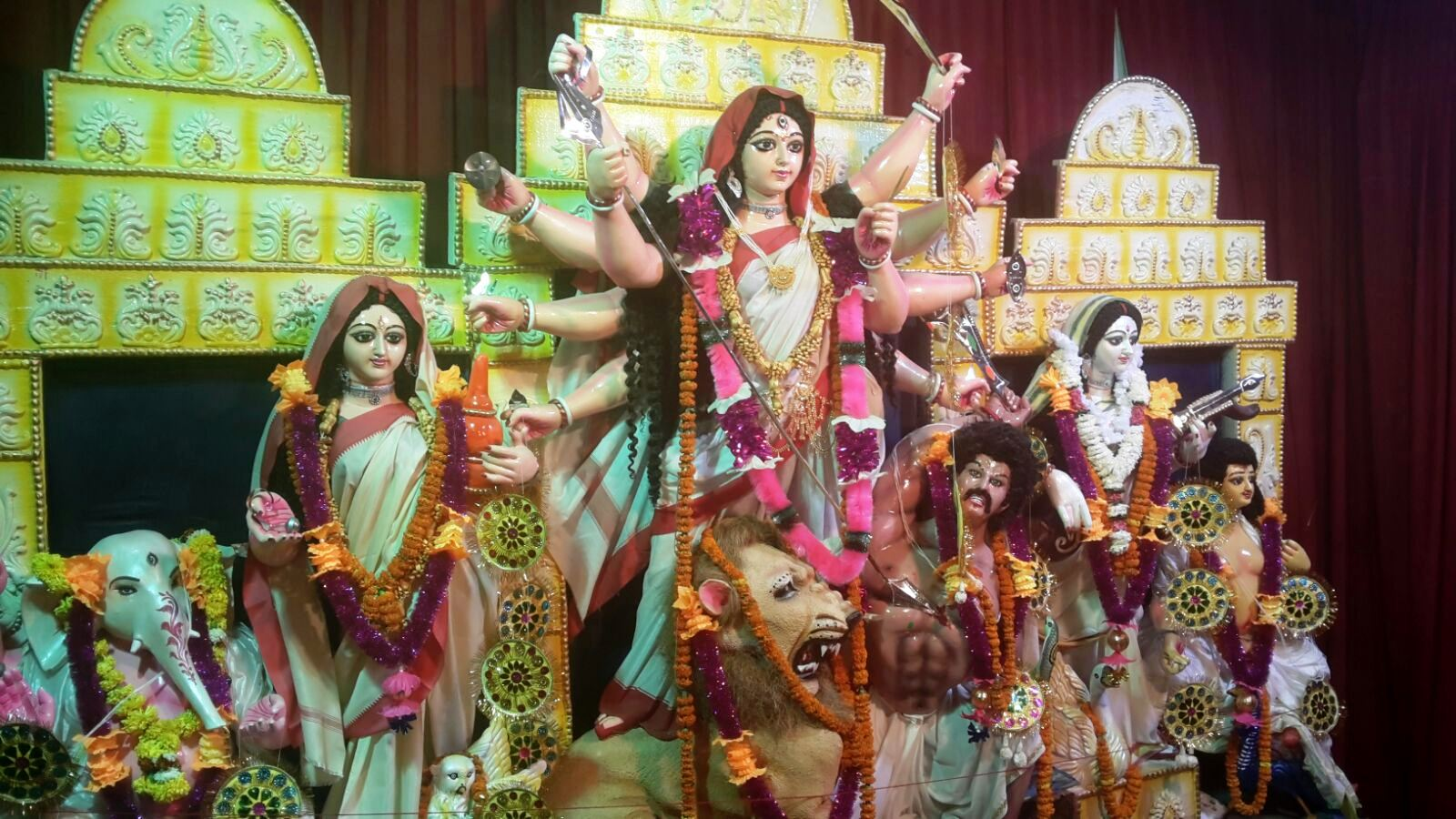
Durga Puja Samiti, Laxmi Nagar, Delhi 2015.

Delhi Durga Puja Charitable & Cultural Samiti, also known as the Kashmere Gate Durga Puja is the oldest community Durga Puja (festival) of Delhi. It is currently held in the lawns of Bengali Sr Sec School, Alipur Road, Delhi. It started in the year of 1910 at Roshanpura Kali Mandir near Nai Sarak as "Baroyari Puja" (Public Festival). It was an effort on the part of the probasi (settled) Bengalis living in the city, especially, of one Railway Doctor Hemchandra Sen (whose efforts saw the Puja being brought at a rented place at Roshanpura). Subsequently, Lala Lachminarayan & his son Lala Girdhari Lal helped the puja samiti grow by providing them space (from 1913 to 1946) in their Dharamshala located near Fathepuri Mosque.

Prior to 1910, the first Durga Puja is believed to have been celebrated as far back as 1842 by one Majumdar of Rajshai, the next two were held in 1875 and 1904. However, all of them were Private Pujas and discontinued thereafter.

With Bengalis embracing English education with great enthusiasm, many had to leave home to serve in different parts of the country during British times. This brought a clutch of Bengalis to the city. And in 1911, when Delhi was officially declared the Capital of British India, a good chunk of them came to work in various government offices. These educated Bengalis formed a close knit community, unhindered by petty professional jealousies. This gave a huge thrust to the annual Durga puja celebrations. At first (in 1910 & 1911), the puja in Delhi was performed by ritually consecrating the ‘mangal ghata’ — the earthenware pot, symbol of the ‘Devi’. However, enthusiasm was unbounded when idol worship (pratima puja) started in 1912. With the help of the late Parmananda Biswas, who happened to be a Christian gentleman, an idol was brought from Varanasi (Kashi). Many Railway employees too made it possible to bring the idol from Kashi to Delhi. This arrangement continued till 1925. From 1926, the idol began to be made in the city itself. Since then its no looking back. Many eminent persons visited this Puja venue including the stalwarts like Netaji Subhas Chandra Bose in 1935 and Smt Indira Gandhi, the then PM, in 1969..

== About the Durga Puja (DDPS) ==
The Delhi Durga Puja Charitable & Cultural Samiti has continued to stress the traditional aura & atmosphere of its Durga Puja Celebrations akin to 'Rajbaris' of West Bengal. At DDPS, Durga is always in the traditional 'Daaker Saaj' (with one frame idol), her garments are stylish, crimped decoration in silver and gold, with an intricate glittering crown and huge earrings. On Dashmi evening, when the idols are immersed in the river Yamuna, DDPS arrives with their magnificent but tranquil goddess on bullock cart chanting 'Durga Mai Ki Jai' and drum beats by at least 10-12 dhakis (Bengali drummers) accompanied by the men & women in dhoti-Kurta and red bordered saree, respectively.

=== Centenary Celebration 2009 (DDPS) ===
The DDPS celebrated its Centenary Year (100 years) in September 2009. The DDPS had been focused on planning it for an entire two years. The DDPS had arranged cultural events from 23 September to 27 September with a stress on the traditional art & culture of India. Mrs Sheila Dikshit, the Chief Minister (Delhi Govt.) offered her Ashtami puja at DDPS during the Evening of 26 September 2009.

== See also ==
- Barowari
