= Kennedy (film) =

- Official release poster
- Directed by: Anurag Kashyap
- Written by: Anurag Kashyap
- Produced by: Ranjan Singh; Kabir Ahuja
- Starring: Rahul Bhat; Sunny Leone; Mohit Takalkar
- Cinematography: Sylvester Fonseca
- Edited by: Tanya Chhabria; Deepak Kattar
- Music by: Boyblanck; Aamir Aziz
- Production companies: Good Bad Films; Zee Studios
- Distributed by: Letterboxd Video Store (International); ZEE5 (India)
- Release dates: 25 May 2023 (Cannes); 20 February 2026 (India)
- Running time: 148 minutes
- Country: India
- Language: Hindi

Kennedy is a 2023 Indian Hindi-language neo-noir crime thriller film written and directed by Anurag Kashyap. It stars Rahul Bhat and Sunny Leone in the lead roles. The film marks the third collaboration of Kashyap and Bhat after Ugly (2013) and Dobaaraa (2022).

Kennedy premiered at the 2023 Cannes Film Festival on 25 May. It was released digitally on Letterboxd Video Store on 10 December 2025 and was released on ZEE5 on 20 February 2026.

== Plot ==
Uday Shetty, a former Mumbai Police officer presumed dead for six years, secretly lives under the name Kennedy. During the COVID-19 pandemic, he works as a cab driver by day and as a contract killer for corrupt Police commissioner Rasheed Khan by night. Six years earlier, Rasheed and Sub-Inspector Abhijit Kaale arranged for Uday to disappear from the police force, with Uday willingly participating in the scheme. Since then, Rasheed has used him for murders, extortion and other illegal operations. Kennedy, a psychopath who enjoys killing, keeps belongings taken from his victims as souvenirs.

During one assignment, Kennedy kills Kabir, a businessman who lives in a Mumbai apartment building. Shortly afterward, he picks up Charlie, a woman living in the same building. Charlie reveals that Kabir was her boyfriend and had bought her apartment. She suspects that Rasheed ordered Kabir's murder because Kabir had refused to cooperate with his demands. Kennedy later secretly sews a camera into his jacket and installs another in his car to record his and his associates' crimes.

Rasheed is under pressure to recover the large bribe he paid to obtain his position as commissioner. With businesses struggling during the pandemic, he orders his officers to increase their extortion collections. He eventually targets a powerful businessman known by the sobriquet "Big Papa" and plans to frighten him with a staged terrorist attack. Rasheed orders Kennedy to obtain a vehicle and rig it with explosives, intending to use the threat to extort money. Kennedy also asks Rasheed to help him locate Saleem Kattawala, a gangster with whom he has a personal feud.

The plan goes wrong when the vehicle explodes at a luxury hotel. Rasheed had instructed Kennedy not to detonate the explosives, but Kennedy carries out the attack himself. Around the same time, Kennedy murders a politician and his family after the politician refuses a bribe and poses a risk to the scheme of changing the state government by a vote of no confidence. The killings create a major scandal and put Rasheed's position at risk.

After the politician's and his family's killing, Kennedy secretly breaks into his own former home. He eats some pudding from the fridge. He leaves gifts for his daughter, who claims to have eaten the pudding to her mother to cover up for him. He later follows her and texts her when she goes out with her friends, observing her from a distance. It is revealed that Kennedy has also installed cameras in the house, allowing him to watch his family while in hiding.

Kennedy's history with Saleem is gradually revealed. In 2014, Uday led a police raid on the home of actress Gunjan, who was romantically involved with Saleem. During the raid, Uday killed Gunjan's brother Chandan despite having no evidence that he knew Saleem's whereabouts. The incident damaged Uday's reputation and earned him the label of a "killer cop". Saleem retaliated by arranging the killing of Uday's young son, Adi. Uday subsequently disappeared, with the police allowing the world to believe that he was dead. His wife blamed him for their son's death and ordered him to leave.

In the present, Saleem continues to evade Uday while communicating with Rasheed. Rasheed promises Kennedy that he will help him find Saleem while manipulating both men. Charlie eventually learns that Kennedy killed Kabir. Rasheed now considers Kennedy a liability and orders one of his men, a sub-inspector and Kennedy's frequent partner in extortion collections, to deal with him.

Saleem confronts Kennedy in Kabir's empty apartment and uses Charlie as leverage. Kennedy kills Saleem and Gunjan, then gives ₹1.4 million to Charlie to give to his daughter. Suspecting that Rasheed gave Saleem his family's whereabouts, Kennedy returns to his apartment while the police raid it. He drives past and shoots Rasheed on the shoulder before escaping from the police and returning home.

Kennedy then sends an email to the government detailing his and Rasheed's crimes. He resumes texting his daughter and apologizes for not being present in her life. She correctly realizes that he is her father and that he is still alive. She repeatedly calls him, but he does not answer. As the phone continues to ring, Kennedy commits suicide by shooting himself in the mouth.

== Cast ==
- Rahul Bhat as Uday Shetty / Kennedy, an ex-police officer-turned-hitman
- Sunny Leone as Charlie
- Mohit Takalkar as Commissioner Rasheed Khan
- Abhilash Thapliyal as Chandan, Gunjan's brother
- Shrikant Yadav as SI Abhijit Kaale
- Megha Burman as Anuradha
- Kurush Deboo as a bookie associate of Shetty
- Karishma Modi as Gunjan Arora, a film actress
- Aamir Dalvi as Saleem Kattawala, a gangster with ties to Shetty's past

== Production ==
The idea of Kennedy was taken from Sudhir Mishra in 2003, who was then making a film with Sanjay Dutt and Tejaswini Kolhapure in the lead roles and for which Kashyap served as the director. Due to reasons unknown, the project was shelved and later Kashyap then took the idea of the protagonist which was based on a real-life police officer named Uday Shetty and scripted the film, making the character an undercover police officer-turned-hitman operating during the times of COVID-19 pandemic while also navigating his personal turmoil, as he tries to connect with his estranged family, particularly the daughter. The plot of the film is inspired from the Antilia bomb scare incident in 2021.

Kashyap stated that Vijay Sethupathi, though not being a part of the cast, helped in shaping the character and the film. For the protagonist, Kashyap initially envisioned Vikram to play the character; his real name is also Kennedy John Victor, which served as an inspiration for the title. Kashyap tried to reach him by sending messages to a wrong number by a miscommunication, until Sobhita Dhulipala, who was then shooting for Ponniyin Selvan, brought this to Vikram's attentation. However, Vikram could not commit to the film due to his scheduling conflicts and the team was in preparation for six months, albeit Vikram sharing his gratitude and happiness that the film was named after him. Kashyap then cast Rahul Bhat for the titular character; it is Bhat's third collaboration with the director after Ugly (2013) and Dobaaraa (2022).

Kashyap added that Bhat had the sense of egolesness and his performance being consistent and outstanding, thereby becoming a binding factor in the film. He praised his dedication of the actor, where he had to peel 700 apples for a specific scene where he had to peel an apple with a gun in hand, and sleeping with a pistol to stay in character. He also avoided sleeping before night shoots to get the weary, bloodshot look. Sunny Leone was considered to be the first choice for Charlie, as Kashyap found her "a fascinating, underutilised, underrated person, and extremely professional". The idea for casting Leone came after watching her infamous and publicised television interview where she received much support for handling judgemental and probing questions levied at her with grace and dignity, adding "I was blown away, and wondered if she would audition" but she eventually accepted his offer. Describing her character Charlie, she said: "She is one of those people who looks amazing and secure on the outside but is hiding how she is actually feeling. People feel secure and insecure at the same time. They smile but fear the worst. I meet several such people on a daily basis."

Kennedy was shot primarily during the COVID-19 pandemic where Kashyap used absolute silence to maintain the dark and gritty tone of the film. The final scene was shot in Colaba where the team could not use real guns for firing, Bhat mimicked the gun firing sounds to ensure authenticity, and in the intense scene, Kashyap stood with Bhat holding his hand as he broke down during close ups. For a song shoot with 150 dancers and 100 crew members, Leone practised that enigmatic laugh in the midst of filming, to make it a part of a personality. After the filming completed, Kashyap showed the film to his directorial peers and friends Sriram Raghavan, Vikramaditya Motwane and Abhishek Chaubey for inputs and suggestions in editing the final cut.

== Music ==
The film's soundtrack featured contributions from Boyblanck, Aamir Aziz and Shashwat Dwivedi. It was released through Zee Music Company on 13 February 2026.

== Release ==
Kennedy had its world premiere at the 2023 Cannes Film Festival on 25 May 2023 where it was showcased at the "Midnight Screenings" section, and went on to receive a standing ovation. The Indian premiere took place at the Jio MAMI Mumbai Film Festival in 2023 held on 30 October 2023, where the screening was held at the Nita Mukesh Ambani Cultural Centre and also well received during the premiere.

Zee Studios handled the distribution of the film, besides co-producing. Because of the change in management at the production company, the film's theatrical release was affected. Kashyap lamented about the situation in January 2025, saying that film lied in the hands of individuals who were inexperienced in filmmaking and was critical of the profit and share prices over creative content which was the reason for the delay. Furthermore, Kashyap wanted the film to be released without an interval, which exhibitors and theatre owners refused to, adding to the delay.

The film was the only Indian film to be selected for the launch lineup of Letterboxd Video Store on 10 December 2025, thereby marking its first wide availability to general audiences through a global TVOD release across more than 20 countries, excluding India. Kashyap welcomed the move, calling it a long-awaited chance for viewers outside festivals to finally watch the film. It premiered in India on ZEE5 on 20 February 2026.

== Reception ==
On the review aggregator website Rotten Tomatoes, 53% of 19 critics' reviews are positive, with an average rating of 6/10.

=== Domestic ===
Rahul Desai of The Hollywood Reporter India wrote "Movies like Kennedy are all about the diversions and idiosyncrasies within pre-existing formulas. The colour is supposed to be the point; the story itself is incidental. Opening with a Wordsworth quote, closing with totem-like ambiguity, those inner monologues — cinema is what happens to us while we’re busy expecting conflicts and resolutions. It invites us to be immersed in the space between dots that may or may not be joined. But Kennedy is, by nature, the kind of film that gets distracted by itself." Saibal Chatterjee of NDTV wrote "In the ultimate analysis, Kennedy is as much an Anurag Kashyap film as it is a Rahul Bhat vehicle. The cinematic work and the onscreen performance complement each other to perfection." Anuj Kumar of The Hindu wrote "Like the name of his new production house, Kashyap’s films these days are good and bad without a conjunction. It is like Kennedy flows into Nishaanchi. Both hold the gun with an unmistakable swagger. While the latter flatters to deceive, the former almost finds its target."

Nandini Ramnath of Scroll.in wrote "The movie’s biggest surprise is an excellent Sunny Leone, in her first real performance. Leone’s Charlie personifies Kennedy’s overall uncanniness. It’s never quite clear what Charlie is up to, which makes her a perfect fit in Kashyap’s out-of-control universe." Deepansh Duggal of The Quint wrote "Kennedy is just the film that Bollywood needed. It seems like the industry has, at least momentarily, found its spine." Abhishek Srivatsava of The Times of India wrote "Kennedy stands as a reminder of what Anurag Kashyap is capable of when he trusts his instincts. It is dark, layered, and unapologetic. It may not aim for mass approval, but it leaves a strong impact. It feels honest to the world it portrays." Shubhra Gupta of The Indian Express wrote "Bhat, returning to Kashyap’s fold after Ugly, pitches in a muscular performance, coasting on a dead-eyed stare and gravelly voice, but remains curiously impassive. After that first unexpected giggle in an elevator, Leone lapses into similarity. After a point, though, the rage dissipates. The music, such a powerfully integral part of the story, trails off. As does the film."

Mayur Sanap of Rediff.com wrote "the violence in Kennedy is often unflinching and the characters offer no easy sympathy, but you stay hooked on how it all plays out. And that's when the classic Anurag Kashyap twist arrives, bringing an unexpected emotional payoff that lands just right. A strong pick for anyone who likes their cinema very dark." B. H. Harsh of Cinema Express wrote "While underwhelming on one level, the film suddenly attains a layer of exorcism for the filmmaker who continues to be one of the most compelling chroniclers of male loneliness. While occasionally off-tune, Kennedy doesn’t miss a beat." Yatamanyu Narain of News18 wrote "In the end, Kennedy defies neat categorisation. It is a crime thriller that doubles as a political lament and a psychological autopsy. It deserved the expanse of the silver screen. Yet even on streaming, it stands tall. For Kashyap, who has moved from the grounded intensity of Nishaanchi to the cerebral intrigue of Dobaaraa, Kennedy remains one of his most haunting provocations yet."

=== International ===
Guy Lodge of Variety said that "Kennedy is thus best enjoyed on a setpiece-to-setpiece basis, as the director’s genre smarts show themselves best in energized individual action sequences [...] Though the film’s visual design doesn’t make good on the kitsch comic-noir styling of its opening credits, it’s nonetheless shot with varnished verve by Sylvester Fonseca, while Tanya Chhabria and Deepak Kattar’s agitated editing ensures the film always feels busy, even when it’s sometimes running in place." Fionnuala Halligan of Screen International wrote, "Kashyap has his following, and an international art-house reputation which still lingers from Gangs of Wasseypur. His output, though, can be inconsistent, and Kennedy seems more like a thinly-conceived, quick-shoot Covid-19 footnote to the director’s prolific career." Stephanie Bunbury of Deadline Hollywood wrote "Kennedy is enjoyably grim but, like Uday Shetty himself, it could do with a shave."
