= Haridwar hate speech controversy =

Dharm Sansad event for establishment of Hindu Rashtra in India

In December 2021, a dharma sansad (religious assembly) of Hindu ascetics was held at Haridwar in Uttarakhand, India, where hate speeches were delivered in which the speakers called for a genocide against Muslims in the name of protecting Hinduism. The government's apathy in the face of the hate event has been condemned by a wide cross section of Indian society, including retired military leaders, civil society activists, students, academics, and retired judges.

== Event ==
The Haridwar dharma sansad (religious assembly) was organised by Yati Narasighanand, the priest of the Dasna Devi temple in Ghaziabad and the chief of the Juna Akhara. The gathering was held over three days during 17–19 December 2021.

The theme of the conference was Islamic Bharat mein Sanatan ka Bhavishya ("The Future of the Sanatan (Dharma) in Islamic India"). It was described as a "strange topic" by The Wire, because nobody other than this gathering believed that India was "Islamic".

Almost all of the speakers were saffron-robed Hindu ascetics (called sadhu if they are male, and sadhvi if they are female). Many of them were also heads of akharas (physical training institutions which are usually run by members of ascetic orders).

Since at least the seventh century, militant ascetics have been a fixture of Hindu civilisation. (Note: Harman, William (2013), "The militant ascetic traditions of India and Sri Lanka", in P. Pratap Kumar (ed.), Contemporary Hinduism, Routledge, pp. 245–, ISBN 9781315729589: (p.248) "We know that armed ascetics are mentioned in the seventh-century Sanskrit drama Harṣacaritra, and in the eleventh-century Sanskrit comedy Prabhodhacandrodaya ... "; (p.249) "The first historically verifiable account of militant ascetic violence seems to have occurred in 1567 when the Emperor Akbar accidentally became embroiled in an impending skirmish between two Hindu ascetic groups armed to the teeth.") They were brought under control by the British in the 18–19th centuries. (Note: van der Veer, Peter (February 2007), "Warrior Ascetics and Indian Empires by William R. Pinch (book review)", American Historical Review: "Gradually, however, with the expansion of British control, the ascetics became marginalized. An important element of their marginalization was the application of British-Indian civil law to the inheritances of ascetics who had both celibate descendants and natural offspring.") The Hindu nationalist organisation Rashtriya Swayamsevak Sangh (RSS) and its religious wing Vishwa Hindu Parishad (VHP) started building links with the ascetic orders in the 1960s. In the 1980s a hundred members of the VHP got initiated into ascetic orders in Haridwar in the name of "protecting culture". (Note: Jha, Dhirendra K. (1 April 2019), "An Unholy Quest: The RSS's attempts to engulf the sadhu class", The Caravan: "A report published in Organiser, on 1 August 1982, indicates that at least part of the phenomenon was planned. Titled "Haridwar Makes History," the report talked of the VHP getting a hundred of its men initiated as "sanyasins" by "seven local historic akharas" of Haridwar, as part of its newly launched project called the Sanskriti Raksha Yojna—"culture-protection plan".)

== Speeches ==
At the assembly, numerous speakers called for the killing of minorities and attacks against their religious spaces.

Prabodhanand Giri, a former RSS pracharak who turned ascetic and runs an organisation called Hindu Raksha Sena in Haridwar, asked Hindus to emulate what was done in Myanmar, referring to the violence against Rohingya Muslims. He called it safai abhiyan ("cleanliness drive"), apparently implying ethnic cleansing. Prabodhanand Giri associates himself with the Uttar Pradesh chief minister Yogi Adityanath, whose picture is featured on his Facebook page. Speaking to the NDTV News the following day, he said that he stood by what he said, and asserted that he was not afraid of the police.

Sadhvi Annapurna, formerly Pooja Shakun Pandey, the head of the Niranjani Akhara and a general secretary of the Hindu Mahasabha, openly called for the killing of Muslims. "If 100 of us are ready to kill two million of them, then we will win and make India a Hindu nation," she said, asking Hindus to be ready to kill and be willing to go to jail. Talking to NDTV News, she too said that she was not afraid of the police.

Another speaker named Swami Anandswaroop, who heads the Sambhavi Dhaam, told people not to celebrate Christmas in Haridwar. He also called for the banning of Muslim vendors from Haridwar. He stated that the government would have to comply with the ruling of the Dharm Sansad because it was the "word of God." Otherwise, it would wage a war like the one which was waged in 1857, a reference to the Indian Rebellion of 1857 against the British Indian government.

== Oath-taking ==
Around the same time as the Haridwar meeting, members of Hindu Yuva Vahini, a Hindutva youth militia which was founded by Yogi Adityanath, met in Delhi in order to take an oath. Raising their hands in a Nazi-style salute, the hundreds of members who were in attendance chanted, "We make a resolution until our last breath: We will make India a Hindu nation, and keep it a Hindu-only nation. We will fight and die if required, we will kill as well." The oath was administered by Suresh Chavhanke, the editor-in-chief of the right-wing news channel, Sudarshan News. He then tweeted a video of the oath to his half a million followers.

== Raipur dharma sansad ==
It later transpired that a similar event was conducted at Raipur during 25-26 December 2021, organised to discuss the creation of a Hindu Rashtra. One speaker, a self-styled godman called Kalicharan Maharaj, declared Mahatma Gandhi a "traitor who destroyed the nation" and praised Gandhi's assassin Nathuram Godse, for which he was later arrested. Others urged participants to arm themselves if they desired to make India a Hindu Rashtra, claimed that tribals in the region were "being lured" into Christianity and that Muslims were "entrapping Hindu women" through what conspiracy theorists call "Love jihad".

== Reactions ==
=== Domestic ===
Video clips of the speeches which were made at the dharma sansad meeting went viral on social media. Admiral Arun Prakash, the former Chief of Naval Staff, described it as a clear threat to India's national security; former Army chief General Ved Prakash Malik agreed and urged urgent action. Trinamool Congress spokesperson Saket Gokhale lodged a police complaint; Indian National Congress spokesperson Shama Mohammed followed a similar course.

Members of BJP and its supporters shared a clipped video of Muslim leader Asaduddin Owaisi to allege that he called for a genocide of Hindus, in an effort to divert attention from the Haridwar hate speeches.

A group of 183 students and academics at the Indian Institutes of Management, Ahmedabad and Bangalore, wrote to the Prime Minister urging action. "Your silence, Honourable Prime Minister, emboldens the hate-filled voices and threatens the unity and integrity of our country," they wrote.

More than 100 veterans, bureaucrats and other prominent citizens including five former chiefs of staff of the Armed Forces wrote an open letter to the President, the Prime Minister, the Chief Justice of India and others, seeking immediate action against those who made open calls for genocide of Indian Muslims in Haridwar and New Delhi. The letter also mentioned targeting of other minorities of India like Christians, Dalits and Sikhs.

Senior Advocate Fali Nariman has criticised the ruling party for keeping silent and almost endorsing the hate speeches.

=== International ===
Twitter from around the world created a 'twitter storm' on 8 January with the hashtag #StopIndianMuslimGenocide. A press statement issued by global Indian diaspora said, "[they] will not merely stand and watch the denial of the humanity of our fellow Indians". As many as 28 diaspora groups from across the globe participated in the protest.

The Organisation of Islamic Cooperation which has 57 Muslim majority nations as its member states called upon the international community including the United Nations to take necessary measures and asked India to ensure the safety of Muslims in response to Haridwar hate speech and hijab controversy in India. India condemned OIC for its remarks saying it has communal mindset and is "hijacked by vested interests to further their nefarious propaganda against India.”

Gregory Stanton, founder of Genocide Watch, who predicted Rwandan genocide 5 years before it happened in 1994, condemned the hate speech and said that a genocide against Muslims is impending in India. He said that the idea of India as a Hindu nation, "which is the Hindutva movement, is contrary to the history of India and the Indian Constitution". Alluding to Indian Prime Minister Modi's silence over the hate speech, Stanton said: "What we have now though, an actual member of the RSS (Rashtriya Swayamsevak Sangh) – this extremist, Hindutva-oriented group – Mr Modi as prime minister of India. So, what we have here is an extremist who has taken over the government." He asked the US Congress to pass a resolution to warn India against a possible Muslim genocide.

=== Law and order ===
On 23 December, the Uttarakhand Police have registered an FIR against Jitendra Narayan Tyagi and unnamed "others" for "promoting hatred between religious groups". Tyagi, formerly Wasim Rizvi, is a recent convert to Hinduism initiated by Yati Narsinghanand. People on social media have questioned why the police did not register case against any of the speakers but named only Tyagi.

Ten days later, on 2 January 2022, a second FIR was filed naming ten organisers of the dharma sansad, including Yati Narasinganand. In Delhi, a complaint was filed on 27 December against Suresh Chavhanke of Sudarshan News for his hate speech at the Hindu Yuva Vahini gathering.

Seventy-six top lawyers and judges wrote to the Chief Justice of India requesting him to take a suo moto notice and urgent judicial intervention. They noted that it was a "grave threat not just to the unity and integrity of our country but also endanger the lives of millions of Muslim citizens".

Yati Narsinganand was seen to be defiant in videos circulated on social media. He predicted that the police would be "on our side".

On 10 January 2022, the Supreme Court has agreed to hear a public interest litigation (PIL) petition from senior advocate Kapil Sibal on behalf of journalist Qurban Ali and former judge of Patna High Court Anjana Prakash. Sibal noted that, despite the registration of FIRs, no arrests have been made, and said that, "without the attention of your lordships, no action will be taken". The Supreme Court issued notices to the Uttarakhand Police and the Delhi Police, seeking their response to the petition.

On 14 January, the Uttarakhand Police arrested Waseem Rizvi alias Jitendra Narayan Tyagi. Yati Narsinganand condemned the arrest and defied the police, saying he himself was with Tyagi during the events. In a video circulated on social media, the police were seen being apologetic.

Narsinganand was later arrested on 16 January 2022, initially for a former case of misogyny pending from September 2021 (insulting the modesty of a woman). The next day, they said the arrest would cover the Haridwar dharma sansad case as well. The police said Narsinganand was served notice to join investigations at police request. As he did not honour the notice, he was arrested and taken into judicial custody for 14 days. (Note: A government official also explained that there were Supreme Court orders that bar the police from making arrests for crimes that need imprisonment of seven years or less.)

After his arrest, Narsinganand delivered further hate speech extending to the Supreme Court, the constitution and "the system", including the police, politicians and the Army. "Those who believe in [the constitution] will be killed", he declared.

On 19 April 2025, Tyagi was acquitted in the hate speech case.

== Aftermath ==
A day before the dharma sansad on 27 April 2022, the Supreme Court told the Uttarakhand government to ensure no hate speech at the event. Uttarakhand Police denied permission to hold the event and filed an FIR. Heavy police presence was present to ensure order.

== See also ==
- Eliminationism
- Hate speech in India
  - Hate speech laws in India
- Hindutva
- Violence against Muslims in independent India

== Bibliography ==
- Harman, William (2013), "The militant ascetic traditions of India and Sri Lanka", in P. Pratap Kumar (ed.), Contemporary Hinduism, Routledge, pp. 245–, ISBN 9781315729589
- Lochtefeld, James G. (Summer 1994), "The Vishva Hindu Parishad and the Roots of Hindu Militancy", Journal of the American Academy of Religion, 72 (2): 587–602, doi:10.1093/jaarel/LXII.2.587, JSTOR 1465279
- Lorenzen, David N. (1978), "Warrior Ascetics in Indian History", Journal of the American Oriental Society, 98 (1): 61–75, doi:10.2307/600151, JSTOR 600151
