= Kennedy (soundtrack) =

Soundtrack album by Boyblanck, Aamir Aziz and Shashwat Dwivedi
- Released: 13 February 2026
- Genre: Feature film soundtrack
- Length: 40:49
- Language: Hindi
- Label: Zee Music Company
- Producers: Jarvis Menezes; Vineeth Jayan; Adam Klemens; CollabStories Collective

Kennedy is the soundtrack album to the 2026 Hindi-language neo-noir crime thriller film of the same name directed by Anurag Kashyap starring Rahul Bhat, Sunny Leone and Mohit Takalkar. The film's soundtrack is composed and written by Boyblanck, Aamir Aziz and Shashwat Dwivedi and written by Jarvis Menezes, Vineeth Jayan and CollabStories Collective. The album was released through Zee Music Company on 13 February 2026, a week prior to the film's release.

== Development ==
The film's soundtrack featured songs and poems composed by Raghav Bhatia, who performs under the stage name Boyblanck, and Aamir Aziz. Bhatia came from a non-musical background and used to compose rap songs as a hobby during his education at Guru Gobind Singh Indraprastha University doing Bachelor of Business Administration. When he created a sample melodic rap named "Mr. Kennedy" which was inspired by the professional wrestler Ken Anderson, he shared to several friends including one who worked as an intern in Kashyap's production design team. She shared to Kashyap who listened to the song and felt that he was "fascinated by the fresh sonics and vibe" and asked him to meet the director, as Kashyap decided to incorporate the sound in the film.

As Bhatia met Kashyap at his house, he recalled that he was intimated by film people; then Kashyap gave him a hug and provided him lunch and hence he felt no discomfort after that. Bhatia then stayed at Kashyap's home composing some of his tunes while Kashyap narrated elements of the film story with novels and comics being inspirations. Bhatia also visited the sets to understand the sound palette and vibe. Bhatia added that Kashyap's films use music differently in comparison with mainstream Hindi films and asked him to support the script with the music. Much of the songs were created at Kashyap's home at a span of six months. He also co-composed the music with his friend Aziz, who came with the ballad-style presentation of his poetry thereby creating a fusion of two different perceptions and personalities. Both of them wrote lyrics and sung the song together, while "The Night Anthem of Kennedy" was performed by Vishal Dadlani.

For the background score, Kashyap used elaborate orchestral pieces inspired from Pyotr Ilyich Tchaikovsky's music that shaped the script. It was recorded by the City of Prague Philharmonic Orchestra conducted by Adam Klemens in Prague. Ashish Narula, who had worked as a music producer and supervisor for Amit Trivedi had worked as the music supervisor for this film, besides designing the background score. He was fascinated on Bhatia and Aziz's works, which resulted in developing and curating the sound design around the songs and themes the duo had created.

== Release ==
The soundtrack was released through Zee Music Company on 13 February 2026.

== Track listing ==
No.	Title	Lyrics	Music	Performer(s)	Length
1.	"The Night Anthem of Kennedy"	Boyblanck, Shashwat Dwivedi	Boyblanck, Shashwat Dwivedi	Vishal Dadlani	3:39
2.	"Dede Tarqeeb"	Aamir Aziz, Boyblanck	Aamir Aziz, Boyblanck	Aamir Aziz, Boyblanck	3:16
3.	"A Love Song"	Aamir Aziz, Boyblanck	Aamir Aziz, Boyblanck	Aamir Aziz, Boyblanck	3:35
4.	"Ae Zindagi"	Aamir Aziz	Aamir Aziz	Aamir Aziz	4:48
5.	"Kabhi Tu Bhi Roke Dekh"	Aamir Aziz, Boyblanck	Aamir Aziz, Boyblanck	Boyblanck	4:25
6.	"Mera Mehboob"	Aamir Aziz	Aamir Aziz	Aamir Aziz	4:30
7.	"Kaali Raatein"	Boyblanck, Shashwat Dwivedi	Boyblanck, Shashwat Dwivedi	Boyblanck	2:41
8.	"The Sound Of Kennedy"	—	Pyotr Ilyich Tchaikovsky	City of Prague Philharmonic Orchestra	11:08
9.	"Kitne Qatl"	Aamir Aziz	—	Aamir Aziz	1:45
10.	"Chhalawa"	Aamir Aziz	—	Aamir Aziz	0:57
Total length:					40:50

== Reception ==
Nandini Ramnath of Scroll.in wrote "Jarring classical music is plastered over scenes of slaughter, while club songs performed by indie artists Amir Aziz and Boyblanck hold forth on generalised moral turpitude." Angel Rani of Deccan Herald said that "bursts of poetry and music from Aamir Aziz and Boyblanck, [gives] the carnage an oddly lyrical backdrop." Poulomi Das of The Federal said the score "leans heavily on percussive pulse and sweeping orchestral swell" while Boyblanck and Aziz's songs "dictate context, giving the film an operatic charge even when the writing stalls".

Yatamanyu Narain of News18 admitted that the "operatic score merges seamlessly with Aamir Aziz’s poetry and Boyblanck’s jazz-inflected compositions" with "Mera Mehboob" and "Kabhi Tu Bhi Roke Dekh" serve as "both narrative propulsion and political commentary" and Tchaikovsky's music being "the film's aching backbone". Priyanka Sundar of Firstpost noted the "Boyblanck and Aamir Aziz’s music add such brilliant undertone to the already intriguing plotline" and further added that the shift from classical, rap, rhythm and blues served as a psychological study to the titular protagonist. Guy Lodge of Variety described it as a "hip-hop-inflected song score". Hema of Outlook described the music as "minimal and haunting and includes sounds that crawl into the head".

== Personnel credits ==
Credits adapted from Zee Music Company:

- Music composers: Boyblanck, Aamir Aziz
- Music producers: Jarvis Menezes, Vineeth Jayan, Adam Klemens, CollabStories Collective
- Music supervisor: Ashish Narula
- Mixing and mastering: Prathamesh Dudhane at Bombay Live Studios
