= Union leader =

Union leader may refer to:

- New Hampshire Union Leader, an American newspaper, formerly the Manchester Union Leader
- Union Leader (film), a 2017 Indian drama film
- the leader of a trade union
- the leader of the Polish Labor Union, a political party
