= Kolhapure =

Kolhapure is a surname. Notable people with the surname include:

- Padmini Kolhapure
- Tejaswini Kolhapure
