= Tum Dena Saath Mera =

Tum Dena Saath Mera (lit. 'You Give Me Help' in Hindi) may refer to:

- "Jab Koi Baat Bigad Jaye", which contains the lyric "Tum Dena Saath Mera", a song by Kumar Sanu and Sadhana Sargam from the 1990 Indian film Jurm
- Tum Dena Saath Mera (2009 TV series), an Indian Hindi-language television series which aired on DD National
- Tum Dena Saath Mera (2011 TV series), an Indian Hindi-language drama series, which aired on Life OK
- Oh Humnava Tum Dena Saath Mera (2026 TV series), an Indian Hindi-language drama series, which aired on StarPlus
