= Murder of Shraddha Walkar =

2022 Shraddha Walkar murder case

Shraddha Walkar
- Born: 1995; Maharashtra, India
- Died: May 18, 2022 (aged 27); Delhi, India
- Cause of death: Strangulation in domestic violence
- Occupation: Call centre employee

The 2022 Shraddha Walkar murder case, also known as the 2022 Fridge murder case, was the gruesome murder of Shraddha Walkar, a 27-year-old Hindu woman who was murdered by her 28-year-old Muslim boyfriend and live-in partner, Aaftab Ameen Poonawala on 18 May 2022 in South West Delhi, India.

Poonawala chopped up Walkar's body into dozens of pieces after murdering her, stored them in his apartment's refrigerator and over the next months, went around disposing them off - a piece at a time - in different parts of the Chhatarpur forest in the city, hoping animals would eat them; taking inspiration from the American TV show, Dexter. Poonawala expressed no remorse or regret for what he did to his Hindu girlfriend in his confession, but instead expressed the idea of doing the same to at least 20 more Hindu women, and also bragged about becoming an Islamic martyr who'll get 72 hoors (virgins) in heaven.

== Incident ==
The case only came to light nearly six months after the murder, when Shraddha's father lodged a missing persons complaint after learning from Shraddha's friends that they were unable to contact her for over two-and-a-half months. On 18 May 2022, 28-year-old Aaftab Poonawala strangled his live-in partner Shraddha over an argument and then proceeded to dismember her body into 35 pieces, allegedly charring her face to hide her identity. A 300-litre fridge was used to store her body parts, which were individually disposed in the Chhatarpur forest over the next 18 days, at around 2 AM every night to avoid suspicion.

Poonawala was arrested by the Delhi Police on 12 November 2022. Shraddha's father has demanded the death penalty for Aaftab.

== About Victim - Shraddha Walkar ==
Shraddha Walkar lived with her family until 2018, which consisted of her mother and her brother in Vasai, in the Palghar District of Maharashtra. She studied in a convent school in Vasai and took admission in a BMM course in Viva Institute of Technology, Virar. She later dropped out from the course. Her father, Vikas Walkar, lived separately and operated an electronics service business. While working at a call centre of an MNC in Malad, Shraddha met Aaftab via the Bumble app. Aaftab was also a resident of Vasai. He went to L.S. Raheja College for BMM studies. He, coincidentally, also worked at the same call centre. In 2019, she moved out to live with him, against her family's wishes, who opposed the interfaith relationship and the idea of living-in with someone "she barely knew".

Friends and family of Shraddha have further accused Poonawala of physically abusing Walkar regularly prior to the murder. They were said to frequently argue over financial issues, and they were arguing when the murder took place. During interrogation, Aftab confessed to the crime and said that they fought often as Shraddha was pressurizing him for marriage.

Shraddha's father, Vikas Walkar, confirmed that he had repeatedly disapproved of Shraddha's relationship with Poonawala, because he was a Muslim and could "resort to domestic violence" against her. He also stated that he had no idea that she was living in Delhi, and thought that she was in Bangalore. Whenever he asked her about her partner, she would not speak much about him. Her father also stated that she was closer to her uncle than to him.

== About Accused - Aaftab Poonawala ==
Aaftab Ameen Poonawala is a Gujarati Muslim. He confessed to the murder after the police discovered discrepancies in his statements and recovered evidence of the murder. He was then taken to the forest to identify Shraddha's remains. The police brought a dog squad to discover the body parts. However, many pieces, including the head, could not be found. Thirteen decomposed parts of her body were found, of which mostly pieces of bones remained. Upon a DNA match, it was confirmed that the body parts indeed belonged to Shraddha.

Being a trained chef, Aaftab knew how to dismember and preserve flesh. The Delhi Police also revealed that after searching on Google, he cleaned blood stains from the floor with some chemicals and disposed of the stained clothes. Aaftab had taken inspiration from the TV show Dexter to dispose the body. He used to sleep in the same room where he had chopped the victim's body. He used to see the face after keeping it in the fridge and also cleaned the fridge after disposing of the body parts. He started by chopping off her liver and intestines.

In his confession, Aaftab stated that he had planned to kill Shraddha Walkar a week before he actually did it. However, seeing her emotional and crying, he decided to "hold back for later". He believed Shraddha Walkar had trust issues and accused him of cheating whenever he talked to someone on the phone.

Poonawala showed no remorse or regret for the heinous crime he committed. He admitted to using online dating apps like Bumble to target Hindu women and also bragged about allegedly luring in 20 more Hindu girls in love with him and wishing to do the same to them. Poonawala also claimed that he'll be remembered as a Shahid (Islamic martyr) amongst Muslims in India and would go to Jannat (Islamic heaven) to get 72 hoors (virgins).

On 31 July 2023, Shraddha Walkar's father, Vikas Madan Walkar, was presented before the sessions court in Saket as a prosecution witness, where he testified that Aaftab Poonawala told him that he had purchased a shovel, two knives, and a hammer and cut both of Shraddha's wrists during the night, placing the body parts in a polythene bag.

In the same session, Shraddha's brother Shreejay Walkar also testified against Aaftab, stating that two weeks after leaving her home, Shraddha told him that she and Aaftab were fighting a lot — verbal and physical. She had told him that Aaftab would beat her up occasionally. In spite of trying to reason with her, she refused to breakup with him, saying that Aaftab would apologise to her after every fight, and she would accept the apology and continue living with him. Following this, Shreejay's interaction with Shraddha also reduced substantially, after he believed she has been completely influenced by Aaftab. After the death of their mother, Shreejay advised Shraddha to breakup with Aaftab again, which she did not listen to.

== Arrest ==
Aaftab Ameen Poonawalla was charged by Delhi police for killing Shraddha Walkar and chopping her body in May 2022. The chargesheet was based on evidence and witness testimony. Police allege he strangled Shraddha and disposed of remains. Aaftab was arrested after investigation found last location in Delhi. He is currently lodged in Tihar Jail cell number 4 in West Delhi, where he is constantly surveilled. The Delhi Police also filed a 6,629 pages long chargesheet against him. The chargesheet was filed 75 days after the investigation began.

On 29 November 2022, when Aaftab was being taken back to jail from the Forensic Science Laboratory of West Delhi, the police van was attacked by sword-wielding members of Hindu Sena. The organisation distanced itself from the incident, saying what the activists did was out of their personal motive, and that the organisation shall never support any act that is against the Constitution of India.

On 15 March 2024, on the request of his lawyer Akshay Bhandari, the Delhi High Court ordered Tihar prison to let Aaftab Poonawala out of his prison cell for eight hours every day like the rest of the inmates. Previously, he was only allowed to step out of his prison cell for two hours. The order was passed by a bench headed by Justice Suresh Kumar Kait on a petition filed by Poonawala, saying that he cannot be kept in solitary confinement under the "garb of security".

== Reactions ==
=== Hindu Reactions ===
Kaushal Kishore, the Union Minister of State for Housing and Urban Affair, said that couples who wish to live together must register in court or should have proper registration. He also added that women should stay away from such live-in relationships.

The case was cited by the Vishwa Hindu Parishad as an example of "love jihad", who demanded that the central government make laws to stop such incidents from happening, adding that they have recorded 420 incidents of love jihad in the past ten years from New Delhi alone. The group also decided to launch a campaign from 21 to 31 December 2022 to raise awareness about love jihad. Walkar's father accused Poonawala of engaging in love jihad on their daughter.

An interfaith wedding reception that had to take place on 20 November 2022 in Vasai, the town Aaftab and Shraddha belonged to, had to be cancelled because of local Hindu organisations contacting the owner of the marriage hall and urging him to cancel the event to ensure peace in the area. The incident was a result of the editor-in-chief of Sudharshan News, Suresh Chavanke, doxing the couple's wedding invitation card on Twitter. While initially the couple had no idea their wedding invitation card had gone viral on social media, they decided to call off the reception following the political discourse it had taken.

=== Muslim Reactions ===
Initial Muslim reactions to the incident was to falsely accuse Aftab Poonawala of being a Parsi Zoroastrian on the internet, with some later also accusing him of being a Sindhi Hindu, related to Aftab Shivdasani. Fact-checkers and netizens later pointed out through Poonawala's social media that he was a Gujarati Muslim, which Poonawala himself later confirmed.

Salim Engineer, the vice president of Jamaat-e-Islami Hind (JIH), condemned claims by political pundits of a definite religious motive behind the crime, and asked Muslims to combat any efforts by the media to play the incident online as a communal matter. Engineer also rejected claims of "love jihad".

Zafar Aafaq, a Muslim journalist writing for Scroll.in, called 'love jihad', cited commonly in the media after the incident, a "conspiracy theory" created by the Hindu right.

Bilal Ahmad, a 21-year old Muslim student at Jamia Millia Islamia claimed he felt drawn into this debate even though he felt the incident had nothing to do with Muslims and had no religious motive.

Asif Khan, a Muslim activist, said in an interview with Scroll.in, that he has been posting doctored articles of domestic violence cases with Hindu men as perpetrators online to distract people away from the Walkar murder case.

Safoora Zargar, a Muslim student activist expressed her thoughts on the incident via the social media platform, X (formerly Twitter), stating that discussions surrounding Aftab Poonawala's actions have been the "lowest moment in India’s gender discourse" and that the incident has caused 'blind hatred' against Muslims to surge massively in India.

Sharjeel Usmani, a Muslim activist on social media refused any form of condemnations for the incident and expressed his displeasure with Muslims as a group collectively having to condemn acts of violence just because the perpetrator was a Muslim.
