= Crime Patrol (TV series) =

Indian crime television series

- Poster
- Also known as: Crime Patrol Satark
- Genre: Reality; Documentary; True crime
- Created by: Subramanian S. Iyer
- Developed by: Subramanian S. Iyer; Darpan Raj
- Directed by: Subramanian S. Iyer; Darshan Raj
- Creative directors: Neeraj Naik; Manish Sharma; Nitin Diwedi
- Presented by: Anup Soni; Sakshi Tanwar; Sonali Kulkarni; Divyanka Tripathi; Sanjeev Tyagi; Nisaar Khan; Diwakar Pundir; Shakti Anand; Ashutosh Rana; Renuka Shahane; Nakuul Mehta; Ajay Devgn
- Starring: See below
- Country of origin: India
- Original language: Hindi
- No. of seasons: 10
- No. of episodes: 2,120

Production
- Producers: Prem Krishen Malhotra; Sunil Mehta; Vipul D. Shah; Anirban Bhattacharyya; Rabindra Choubey; Damini Kanwal Shetty
- Editors: Dharmendra Gupta; Manoj Singh; Subrata Guha; Prashant Palande
- Running time: 45 minutes
- Production companies: Cinevistaas Limited; Optimystix Entertainment; RowdyRascal; Credence Studio; CamsklubStudioPvtltd; Studio NEXT

Original release
- Network: Sony Entertainment Television; SonyLIV
- Release: 9 May 2003 – 1 October 2026

Related
- Crime Patrol Dial 100

Crime Patrol is an Indian true crime anthology series created by Subramanian S.lyer for Sony Entertainment Television. The first season was created by Cinevistaas Limited and directed by Anshuman Kishore Singh, while later seasons were created by Optimystix Entertainment. The series is set in Mumbai, India. The first and second seasons' episodes are 30 minutes long, while the subsequent seasons' episodes are 40 minutes long.

The series, which premiered on May 9, 2003, is the longest-running reality crime television series in India. In 2021, the show won the Milestone Achievement Award at the 20th Indian Television Academy Awards (ITA Awards).

== Plot ==
The series presents dramatized versions of crime cases that occurred in India. Series anchor, Anup Soni, suggests the correct measures to avert crimes while narrating real-life stories revolving around harassment, kidnapping, and murder. The series opens its viewers' minds with these cases by making them aware of the crime around them.

Since June 2015, Crime Patrol has not only focused on creating awareness about crimes but has also aimed to help the victims depicted in the episodes.

== Cast ==
=== Hosts ===
- Anup Soni
- Sakshi Tanwar
- Sonali Kulkarni
- Divyanka Tripathi
- Sanjeev Tyagi
- Diwakar Pundir
- Shakti Anand
- Ashutosh Rana
- Renuka Shahane
- Nakuul Mehta
- Ajay Devgn

=== Cast ===
- Sanjeev Tyagi as Abhimanyu Jindal, a fictitious supercop and various other role as Police Inspector
- Ujjwal Chopra as Police Inspector and various other roles
- Saurabh Suman as Police Sub Inspector and various other roles
- Ankit Bhardwaj
- Pushkar Priyadarshi
- Sana Sayyad as Manisha
- Adaa Khan
- Pankaj Berry
- Kamlesh Oza
- Rushad Rana
- Harsh Khurana
- Reema Worah
- Ashi Singh
- Mazher Sayed
- Sudeep Sarangi
- Avneet Kaur as Kajal
- Vishal Jethwa as Vicky
- Sayantani Ghosh
- Shriya Pilgaonkar
- Ahsaas Channa
- Akshita Mudgal
- Aadesh Chaudhary as Rupank Bhanot
- Tanishq Rajan as Disha
- Mangesh Desai as Police Inspector Sunil Kelkar

=== Special appearances ===
- Juhi Chawla (2011)
- Kailash Satyarthi (2015)
- Ranveer Singh (2015)

== Series overview ==
Series	Episodes	Originally released	
Series	Episodes	First released	Last released
1	134	9 May 2003	3 March 2006
2	88	26 January 2010	24 May 2010
3	28	24 September 2010	25 December 2010
4	942	29 April 2011	9 December 2018
5	559	15 July 2019	3 December 2021
6	215	7 March 2022	31 December 2022
7	66	10 July 2023	19 January 2024
8	40	15 July 2024	22 November 2024
9	28	12 April 2025	13 July 2025
10	20	31 August 2026	1 October 2026

=== Season 1 (2003–2006) ===
The first season was a weekly program airing on Friday nights, hosted by Diwakar Pundir, who was later replaced by Shakti Anand in late 2004. Partha Dey was the director of Anchor Links featuring Shakti Anand, and was also the director of special episodes, such as the 100th Episode, which was based on crimes in Delhi. The 100th episode was a collaboration between Sony TV and NDTV. Nitesh Mishra was the casting director. Season one was immediately popular. Season one recreated live-staged crime and the citizens' response to it. These were a part of the show and were done with multiple hidden cameras, line produced and directed by Partha Dey in Delhi, Haryana, MP, UP and Punjab.

=== Season 2 (2010) ===
Due to the first season's popularity, Sony TV decided to bring back the series for a second season. The second season was aired from Monday to Thursday nights. Season 2 was presented by Anup Soni and Sakshi Tanwar. Unlike the first season, this season didn't perform that well in TRP Ratings.

=== Season 3 (2010) ===
The third season was broadcast on Friday and Saturday nights. This season soon went off-air due to low TRP ratings.

=== Season 4 (2011–2018) ===
The fourth season premiered four months after the third season ended as Crime Patrol Dastak. The season managed to gain better TRP ratings. The fourth season was initially aired on Friday and Saturday nights. From April 11, 2014, the series was aired three days a week from Friday to Sunday nights. The series was given a new title Crime Patrol Satark (previously Crime Patrol Dastak until July 6, 2014). During the last quarter of 2017, Soni decided to exit the series, citing that he wanted to focus on his acting career in films. "I requested that I would like to focus on films, and they were ok with it. They wanted me to complete my contract that ended this March–April", said Soni. After Anup Soni, Sanjeev Tyagi replaced him until he joined again.

=== Season 5 (2019–2021) ===
The fifth season premiered on July 15, 2019, and aired on Monday–Friday nights. Anup Soni returned to host the series 15 months after leaving the show. After some time, Divyanka Tripathi Dahiya hosted the show, followed by Sonali Kulkarni and then later Ashutosh Rana. In December 2021, it was announced that the show would be halted for three months - this signalled the end of the fifth season and the show returned in March 2022 for its sixth season.

=== Season 6 (2022) ===
The sixth season titled Crime Patrol 2.0 premiered on March 7, 2022, and aired on Monday–Friday nights. This season got low TRP ratings due to its format, so later the show returned to its original old format with actors from prior seasons like Sanjeev Tyagi, Nissar Khan, etc. Tyagi returned to the show in May 2022.

=== Season 7 (2023) ===
The seventh season titled Crime Patrol - 48 Hours premiered on 10 July 2023 and aired on Monday-Friday nights.

=== Season 8 (2024) ===
The eighth season titled Crime Patrol — City Crimes premiered on 15 July 2024. The series ended on 22 November 2024 with 40 episodes.

=== Season 9 (2025) ===
The ninth season titled Crime Patrol — 26 Jurm, 26 Cases premiered on 12 April 2025 and ended on 13 July 2025.

=== Season 10 (2026) ===
The tenth season titled Crime Patrol – Crime Ka Current Season premiered on 31 August 2026 and ended on 1 October 2026. It aired on Monday to Thursday nights. The series was hosted by Ajay Devgan.

== Spin-off ==
A spin-off series, Crime Patrol Dial 100 premiered on October 26, 2015, aired on Monday–Thursday nights, and was produced by different production companies. It ended on July 12, 2019.

== Controversies ==
=== Delhi gang-rape case ===
Bhartiya Stree Shakti (Nagpur Wing), a non-governmental organisation, Information and Broadcasting Ministry of India intervened and asked Sony Entertainment Television not to telecast a program about the Delhi gang-rape case. On 10 September 2013, the show was given permission to present the 2012 Delhi gang rape case on their show, and the promos of the episode were aired. The episode was aired in a two-episode part on September 21, 2013, and September 22, 2013.

=== Om Prakash Chautala teacher recruitment scam ===
Sony TV was to air episodes based on the Om Prakash Chautala teacher recruitment scam in the show. On 22 February 2013 Delhi High Court restrained Sony TV from telecasting the related episodes until 4 April 2013, upon the appeal by Chautala and others as the case was still in court and there was a possibility of bias of the show on the case. On 2 March 2013, show was given clearance by High Court. Clearance was challenged in Supreme Court and on 6 March 2013, the episodes of this case were again put on hold. On 3 May 2013, the Supreme Court allowed Sony TV to telecast episodes as the trial was complete and the judgment of conviction and sentence were in the public domain.

Later, there were episodes of Crime Patrol that dealt with teacher recruitment scams, they did not specifically mention the Om Prakash Chautala scam. Episodes 252 and 253, which aired on May 31, 2013, and June 21, 2013, respectively, focused on Teacher Recruitment Scam.

=== Murder of Shraddha Walkar ===
A December 2022 episode about a murder involving an interfaith relationship, which bore similarities with the murder of Shraddha Walkar the same year, faced online backlash with calls for a boycott of the broadcaster Sony TV, for allegedly changing the religion of the murder-accused to Hindu and the victim to Christian. Though Sony later clarified that the episode was not based on the recent incident but on a similar case from 2011, it nonetheless removed the episode from access due to the controversy.

== Reception ==
=== Critical response ===
Crime Patrol generally receives positive reviews from critics. Riptide Malhotra of India TV stated, "The popularity of Crime Patrol is quite high and Sony regularly airs on weekends. The show is so popular that it keeps people awake until late at night to watch the latest episodes. This show is not just a show that airs crime stories, but is a true depiction of real-life happenings presented in a dramatized form."

=== Ratings ===
Riptide Malhotra of India TV gave the series 4/5 stars and further stated, "The show is presented in such a way that will not threaten you but will make you conscious enough with that extra punch and appeal. Overall, to make the show convincing is the major responsibility of the host."

In 2011, it was one of the most watched Hindi GECs, maintaining its position in the top 20, averaging 3+ TVR. The Baby Falak Case sequence aired during February 2012 made the series the most watched Hindi GEG program with 6.78 TVR. The following week after it, the series maintained its top position with 5.27 TVR. gmil

=== Accolades ===
The series has won Star Guild Awards for Best Non-Fiction Series in 2013. The series has won Indian Telly Awards for Best Thriller Programme in 2012 and 2013. Subramanian S Iyer and Amit Jha (directors) won Indian Telly Jury Award for Best Director (thriller/crime/horror) in 2012, while Durgesh Pesharwar and Shailendra were nominated. Shreya Dudheria and Subramanian S Iyer were nominated for the same category of the same award in 2013.

Subramanian S Iyer was nominated for Best Screenplay Writer (drama series & soap) of Indian Telly Jury Awards in 2012, and won in 2013. Charudutt Acharya won the Indian Telly Jury Award for Best Dialogue Writer (drama series & soap) in 2013. The series was nominated for Best Weekly Serial of Indian Telly Awards in 2012 and 2013 and for Best Thriller / Horror Serial of Indian Television Academy Awards in 2014. In February 2021, the series won the Milestone Achievement Award at the 20th Indian Television Academy Awards (ITA Awards).

== See also ==
- India's Most Wanted
- Savdhaan India
