= Karishma Modi =

Indian television actress

- Born: 23 December 1980 (age 45); Ahmedabad, Gujarat, India
- Occupations: Model, actress and television anchor

Karishma Modi is an Indian model, actress and television anchor.

Modi won the Femina 'Look of the Year' award in 1999 and was awarded 'Miss Talented' at the Elite Model Look '99 in France.

== Filmography ==
=== Films ===
Year	Title	Role	Language	Notes	Ref.
2023	Kennedy	Gunjan	Hindi		

=== Television ===
Year	Show	Role
2000	Rishtey	Sherry
2008, 2010	CID	Diana / Swati
2012–2014	SuperCops Vs SuperVillains	Senior Inspector Kashish
2015	Adaalat	Advocate Anita D'Souza
