= Union Leader (film) =

- Theatrical release poster
- Directed by: Sanjay Patel
- Written by: Sanjay Patel; John Winston Rainey
- Produced by: Sanjay Patel
- Starring: Rahul Bhat; Tillotama Shome
- Cinematography: Nilip Deb
- Edited by: Aurelien Brentraus; Brock Roberts
- Production company: Dimlight Pictures
- Distributed by: PVR Vcaao
- Release dates: 24 September 2017 (Canada); 19 January 2018 (India)
- Running time: 105 Mins
- Countries: India; Canada
- Language: Hindi

Union Leader is a 2017 Indian drama film directed by Sanjay Patel and starring Rahul Bhat and Tillotama Shome. The film follows the story of a chemical factory supervisor who raises the issue of worker's health and safety against an unsympathetic management.

== Plot ==
Jay Gohil (Bhat) is employed as supervisor at a chromium sulfate factory of Apollo Chemicals in Gujarat. The workers there are experiencing deteriorating health conditions; respiratory diseases and cancers and five eventually succumb to their illness, all because of the poor working conditions at the factory. Leader of their union is in cahoots with the factory management and turns a blind eye to their problems. Reluctantly Jay becomes the voice of his colleagues and demands wage hike and medical insurance. Angered by the workers' demands, factory owner decides to shut it down.

Jay's son Harsh (Tirth Sharma) believes in Gandhism and plays a key role in raising the workers' issues.

== Cast ==
- Rahul Bhat as Jay
- Tillotama Shome as Geeta
- Jayesh More as Manoj
- Samvedna Suwalka as Rita
- Jay Vithlani as Anand
- Chetan Daiya
- Mehul Buch

== Production ==
Patel had worked as chemical engineer in Gujarat before moving to Canada. He based the film on his observations of the workers in chemical factories in Gujarat. The project began under the title Kamdar Union and marked Patel's maiden attempt at making a full-length feature film. Costumes worn by actors in the film were bought from a local market and were "age[d]" using "herbal colours and other products" in 11–12 days each.

The filming took place at Vatva, Ahmedabad and other places in Gujarat and it was wrapped up towards the end of December 2016. Patel cast Indian actors for his film and managed the finances himself. However, the post-production work was done in Calgary, Canada and the film's title was changed to Union Leader.

== Release ==
The film was released in theatres on 19 January 2018. A special screening of the film was held at the Suncor Energy Centre, Fort McMurray in November 2017.

== Reception ==
Though critical of the film, Anna MM Vetticad in her review for Firstpost praised Bhat's performance and gave the film a 1.5/5 rating. She opined that the film's "[commitment] to its cause" was its strength and that Bhat had brought an "X factor to his performance" which exceeded the screenplay's limitations. He, however, felt that the supporting characters had not been used "effectively" which robbed the film of its "emotional stirrings". Nandini Ramnath of Scroll.in was appreciative of the film's "sympathetic portrayal of the workers", noting that the "convincing cast of supporting actors ... actually look like blue-collared representatives rather than Bollywood extras". She wrote that the remaining cast "works better" than Bhat who was "passable".

Pallabi Dey Purkayastha of The Times of India gave the film a 2.5/5 rating, noting that although the film showed "pragmatism" but "crumbles towards the end because of poor execution". Ravi Bule of Amar Ujala wrote that Shome did justice to her role, while rating the film 2/5.

=== Accolades ===
Award	Category	Year	Result	Ref.
AMPIA (Rosie Awards)	Best Dramatic Feature Made for TV Movie; Best Director (Drama Over 30 Minutes); Best Editor (Drama Over 30 Minutes)	2018	Nominated	
St. Louis International Film Festival	Best Movie	2017	Nominated	
10th Colombia George International (Angaelica) Film Festival	Legacy Awards — Best of Fest	2017	Won	
17th Kansas International Film Festival	Best Film	2017	Nominated	
13th Utopia Film Festival	Best Film	2017	Nominated	
18th Ojai Film Festival	Best Film	2017	Nominated	
32nd Fort Lauderdale International Film Festival	Best Film	2017	Nominated	
51st Hof International Film Festival, Germany	Emerging Director	2017	Nominated	
24th CineSol Film Festival, Texas	Best Film	2017	Nominated	
11th Red Rock Film Festival, Utah	Best Film	2017	Nominated	
7th Vancouver International South Asian Film Festival	Best Feature Film	2017	Nominated	
48th International Film Festival of India	Cinema of the World	2017	Nominated	
