= Yes Papa =

- Theatrical release poster
- Directed by: Saif Hyder Hasan; Hariharasudhan Balasubramani
- Written by: Saif Hyder Hasan
- Starring: Tejaswini Kolhapure; Anant Mahadevan; Nandita Puri; Divya Seth Shah; Geetika Tyagi; Sanjeev Tyagi
- Release date: 29 March 2024
- Running time: 1 hours 25 minutes
- Country: India
- Language: Hindi

Yes Papa is a 2024 Indian Hindi-language drama film directed by Saif Hyder Hasan and Hariharasudhan Balasubramani. The movie stars Tejaswini Kolhapure, Anant Mahadevan, Nandita Puri, Divya Seth Shah, Geetika Tyagi, and Sanjeev Tyagi in the lead roles.

== Plot ==
The story is about a girl who is sexually molested by her father.

== Cast ==
- Tejaswini Kolhapure as Vinita's lawyer
- Anant Mahadevan as Vinita's father
- Nandita Puri
- Divya Seth Shah as judge
- Geetika Tyagi as Vinita Ghoshal
- Sanjeev Tyagi as Pradeep Honnur

== Release ==
The film was officially released on 29 March 2024.

== Reception ==
Shubhra Gupta of Indian Express rated 1.5/5 stars and observed, "The film does have the right intention. Child sexual abuse is a difficult subject, and needs wider amplification."

Archika Khurana from the Times of India rated it 3.5 out of 5 stars. "Yes Papa delves into the suffering felt by child abuse survivors all their lives, especially if the perpetrator is a parent. It also touches upon the importance of breaking the silence and how we must take children seriously and listen to them since fear and stigma are the most significant hurdles to such interactions and their reporting. Even mothers frequently ask their children to remain silent when confronted with an uncomfortable scenario. This is beautifully conveyed in the story. Shot in black and white this 85-minute film highlights the critical need to break the silence around child sexual assault without passing any judgment. Instead, it lets the viewers ponder the subject and start a dialogue as it needs attention. Without sensationalizing director Saif Hyder Hasan firmly puts his point across to spread awareness, which is handled gently but will undoubtedly shake you," Archika observed.

Jyoti Raghav from Amar Ujala gave a rating of 1.5 out of 5 and remarked, "In this film, Anant Mahadevan has portrayed the role of Sangi Ghoshal's father alongside Vinita Ghoshal. The way he recites poetry and sings songs in front of his daughter makes it seem like he is not her father but rather his lover, for whom he longs in separation. This has been the most stellar role of Anant Mahadevan's career. Anant Mahadevan himself has directed the film but couldn't grasp the essence of the story and his character. Geetika Tyagi seemed ineffective in the role of Vinita Ghoshal. Tejaswini Kolhapure and Sanjeev Tyagi did not fit the roles of the lawyer at all. Sanjeev Tyagi appeared to mimic several other artists in the role of the lawyer. Watching Nandita Puri in the role of Nandita Ghoshal, Vinita Ghoshal's mother feels like director Saif Haider Hasan couldn't find anyone suitable for this character, so he brought in Nandita Puri. Divya Seth has certainly made an effort to deliver a better performance in the role of the judge. The film's cinematography, editing, music, background score, and production value are average."
