= Bundelkhand Mukti Morcha =

Political party in India

Bundelkhand Mukti Morcha (Hindi: बुन्देलखंड मुक्ति मोर्चा, Bundelkhand Liberation Front) is a political party in India. The film star Raja Bundela is the president of the party. The party struggles for the creation of a Bundelkhand state (today part of Uttar Pradesh and Madhya Pradesh). In the Lok Sabha elections 2004 Bundela stood on an Indian National Congress ticket in Jhansi, the "capital" of Bundelkhand. Bundela got 104584 votes (12.76%).
