= The Birds Who Fear Death =

- Film poster
- Directed by: Sanjay Patel
- Written by: Sanjay Patel
- Produced by: Sanjay Patel
- Starring: Adam Beach; Simon Baker; Graham Greene; Carmen Moore; Tanaya Beatty; Nathaniel Arcand; Glen Gould; Tommy J. Mueller
- Cinematography: Charles Hamilton
- Edited by: Sanjay Patel; Mark Goldman
- Production company: Dim Light Pictures Inc
- Distributed by: Mongrel Media
- Release date: September 21, 2024 (CIFF)
- Running time: 102 minutes
- Country: Canada
- Language: English

The Birds Who Fear Death is a 2024 Canadian drama film written, directed and produced by Sanjay Patel, starring Adam Beach, Simon Baker, and Graham Greene.

The film premiered at the Calgary International Film Festival on September 21, 2024.

== Premise ==
Two disinherited brothers without money travel into the Canadian wilderness to search for their heritage and a lost fortune.

== Cast ==
- Adam Beach as Adam
- Simon Baker as Ryan
- Graham Greene as Chief Ed
- Carmen Moore as Shanon
- Tanaya Beatty as Constance
- Nathaniel Arcand as Don
- Glen Gould as Faddy
- Michelle Thrush as Marilyn
- Tommy J. Mueller as Police Chief Robert
- Julian Black Antelope as Jarome
- Shane Ghostkeeper as Cube

== Filming ==
Principal photography took place in Calgary and the surrounding areas of Alberta, Canada during the summer and fall of 2022.

== Release ==
Mongrel Media, a film distributor, released the film in Canada.

It screened in the Borsos Competition program at the 2024 Whistler Film Festival.
