= Prabodhanand Giri =

Indian religious leader associated with Hindutva ideology

Prabodhanand Giri is a controversial Indian religious leader associated with far-right Hindutva ideology. He is the head of the Hindu Raksha Sena, an organization that advocates for Hindu nationalism and has been linked to calls for violence against Muslims in India. He gained notoriety for his role in the Haridwar Dharma Sansad hate speech controversy in December 2021, where he allegedly incited violence and called for the ethnic cleansing of Muslims, drawing comparisons to the genocide in Myanmar.

== Controversial role in the Haridwar Dharam Sansad (2021) ==
During the Haridwar Dharam Sansad (religious conclave) in December 2021, Giri allegedly incited violence and urged Hindus to take up arms against Muslims. He described them as a threat to the nation, echoing the sentiments of other far-right leaders present at the event. His inflammatory remarks, which have been widely condemned, included claims that Muslims pose a serious threat to Hinduism and India's social fabric. This rhetoric has been linked to a broader agenda of extremist Hindu groups that promote violence against religious minorities, particularly Muslims.

== See also ==
- Saffron terrorism
- Rohingya genocide
- Religious violence in India
