= Sanjay Patel (filmmaker) =

Indian film director

- Born: India
- Citizenship: Canadian
- Occupations: Filmmaker, engineer
- Known for: Union Leader, If You Love Your Children

Sanjay Patel is an Indo-Canadian filmmaker mostly known for his 2017 film Union Leader which was screened at the 48th International Film Festival of India in 2017. He also directed the award winning short film If You Love Your Children in 2014. Patel is the author of the book The Future of Oil.

== Biography ==
Patel studied chemical engineering in India. He worked in a chemical plant in Gujarat for around seven years prior to moving to Canada in 2000. Patel, without any formal study of filmmaking, directed and produced his first short film called If You Love Your Children in 2014 receiving multiple awards and nominations since its release. In 2012, he published his first book titled The Future of Oil.

== Filmography ==
| Year | Movie | Note |
|---|---|---|
| 2014 | If You Love Your Children | Short film |
| 2017 | Union Leader | |
| 2024 | The Birds Who Fear Death | |
