= Nikos Andritsakis =

Greek cinematographer

- Occupation: Cinematographer
- Years active: 2010–present
- Website: andritsakis.com

Nikos Andritsakis is a Greek cinematographer who predominantly works in Hindi cinema.

== Early life ==
Born in Greece, Andritsakis moved to London at the age of 24, where he worked for eight years before beginning to shuttle between the UK and India. Andritsakis is a graduate of London Film School.

== Career ==
Andritsakis first came to India to work on a project that was eventually shelved. His expertise in digital format cinematography caught the attention of director Dibakar Banerjee. Together, they have worked on three films, starting with Love, Sex Aur Dhokha (2010).

== Filmography ==
Year	Title	Language	Notes
2010	Love Sex Aur Dhokha	Hindi	Anthology
2011	Chalo Dilli	Hindi	
2012	Shanghai	Hindi	
2013	Ugly	Hindi	
2013	Bombay Talkies	Hindi	
2015	Detective Byomkesh Bakshy!	Hindi	
2018	The Ashram	English	
2019	Made in Heaven	Hindi	TV series
2023	The Archies	Hindi	
