= Mujhe Chaand Chahiye =

- Created by: Prayas Productions, now named Chitrayug Productions
- Directed by: Raja Bundela
- Starring: Tejaswini Kolhapure; Raja Bundela; Manav Kaul
- Country of origin: India
- Original language: Hindi
- No. of episodes: Total 68

Production
- Producer: Satish Kaushik
- Running time: approx. 24 minutes

Original release
- Network: Zee TV

Mujhe Chaand Chahiye is a television series that aired on Zee TV channel in 1998–1999. The series was shot in a town called Chanderi in Madhya Pradesh, starring Tejaswini Kolhapure, who started her acting career with this series. The series is based on the eponymous Hindi novel by Surendra Verma.

== Concept ==
The story revolves around the life of a girl named Varsha and her journey towards the big world. Despite being raised in a small town (Shajahanpur), Varsha's confidence in achieving her aim is very high. She wants to be a professional stage actor and, being ahead of her time, her thoughts are too evolved to be appreciated by her family. She wants to accomplish her goal. Urged by her teacher one day, she goes to Lucknow, learns stage acting and gets admitted into the National School of Drama, which becomes the launchpad for her career.

Not only does she become successful, she becomes a superstar. But in her attempt to become the queen of glamour, she realises how shallow the glamour world is. At this point, she starts to realise that her family values, though old, were fulfilling. Now she is afraid to go back home, because she believes that her family might not accept her. The question remains: Will she be able to leave the world of glamour?

== Cast ==
- Raja Bundela
- Kamalika Guha Thakurta as Divya
- Tejaswini Kolhapure as Varsha
- Rakesh Paul as Kishore
- Amit Behl
- Rashmi Goda as Jhalli
- Ambar Singh
- Manav Kaul as Mohan
