= Kamalika Guha Thakurta =

Indian television actress

Kamalika Guha Thakurta (born 8 November 1964) is an Indian television actress who hails from West Bengal. She made her debut with Mujhe Chaand Chahiye and found success with Kyunki Saas Bhi Kabhi Bahu Thi. She also played the role of Sumitra in Vishnu Puran (TV series).

In Naagin, she plays the role of Guru Maa, who lives in a mandir, worships Maa kali, and plans to get rid of the Naagin (Shivanya, Mother of Mahanagrani Shivangi)

She has also appeared on stage in 2014, with a part in Emotional Creature, a series of monologues written by Eve Ensler.

== TV serials ==
- In Mujhe Chaand Chahiye as Divya
- In Baa Bahoo aur Baby as Anish's Mom
- In Kashti
- In Kyunki Saas Bhi Kabhi Bahu Thi as Gayatri Jamnadas Virani
- In Vishnu Puran (TV series) as Sumitra
- In Kya Hadsaa Kya Haqeeqat
- In Karam Apnaa Apnaa as Devika
- In Kasturi as Gayatri Dev
- In Balika Vadhu as Pramila
- In Yahaaan Main Ghar Ghar Kheli as Tejaswini
- In Jhilmil Sitaaron Ka Aangan Hoga
- In Zindagi Wins as Vandita Srinivas
- In Ek Hasina Thi (TV series) as Payal and Nitya's mom
- In Maharakshak: Devi as Meena
- In Jodha Akbar as Damayanti, mother of Laboni
- In Naagin as Guru Maa
- In Sasural Simar Ka as Mahamaya "Witch"
- In Yeh Rishta Kya Kehlata Hai as Gurumaa
- In Santoshi Maa as Kamini
- In Durga – Mata Ki Chhaya as Jogmaya
- In Qayaamat Se Qayaamat Tak as Damayanthi
- In Kyunki Saas Bhi Kabhi Bahu Thi 2 as Gayatri Jamnadas Virani
- In Saru as Kamini
- In Adaalat - Episode 144
