= Sanjeev Tyagi =

Indian actor

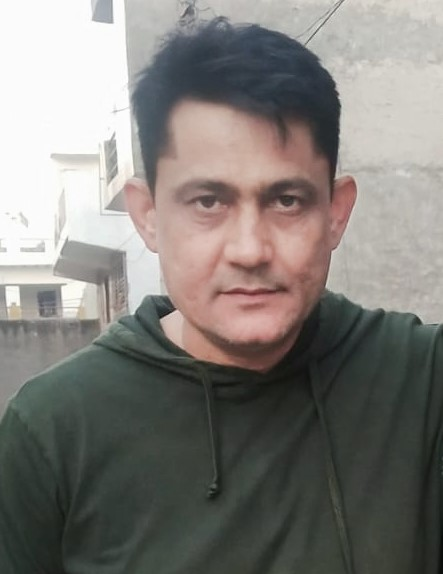
- Born: 29 June 1971 (age 55); Meerut, Uttar Pradesh, India
- Education: Chaudhary Charan Singh University (previously Meerut University)
- Occupation: Actor
- Years active: 2000–present
- Known for: Inspector in Crime Patrol since 2011
- Spouse: Dipali Tyagi (m. 2001)

Sanjeev Tyagi (born 29 June 1971), also credited as Sanjeev Tyaagi, is an Indian television and film actor, known for his role as police inspector in Crime Patrol at Sony TV. He appeared in most of the Crime Patrol's episodes. He appeared in Akshay Kumar's Baby and played the role of D. Mishra in Hanak, a movie based on Vikas Dubey's life. He is vocal about women and child safety.

== Career ==
Tyagi started his career with DD National Shows. From 2011 through 2021, and starting again in 2022, he played Abhimanyu Jindal, an angry police inspector in Crime Patrol.

== Filmography ==
†	Denotes films that have not yet been released

=== Films ===
Year	Movie	Role	Notes	Ref(s)
2011	Money Devo Bhava	Shailendra		
2015	Baby	Sharan (Policeman)		
2021	Hanak	D. Mishra	Biopic on Vikas Dubey	
2023	Aazam	PSI Ankit More		
2024	Yes Papa	Pradeep Honnur	released at IIFFB(India International Film Festival of Boston) in 2022; in cinemas in March 2024	
	Beeru†	TBA	Completed	

=== Television ===
Year	Show	Role	Notes	Ref(s)
2003	Kabhi Aaye Na Judaai			
2005	Kahaani Ghar Ghar Kii	Mr. Malhotra		
2006	Raavan	Dhumraksh		
2010	Karam Dhram Apna Apna	Amar		
2011–2021	Crime Patrol	Inspector/Abhimanyu Jindal/Kevalram/Thakur Mahendra Singh	Also host for some episodes.	
2011–2014	Adaalat	Dr. Jhanjhani/Dr. Subhankar Ghosh/Keshav Balhara/Ranjan Mishra/Ronnie Iyer		
2012	Bin Bitiya Swarg Adhoora	Pradeep Talwar		
2012	Junoon – Aisi Nafrat Toh Kaisa Ishq	Mishra Ji		
2014	Million Dollar Girl	Avanti's Taya		
2019	Court Room: Sachchai Hazir Ho	Lawyer		
2022	Crime Patrol 2.0	Abhimanyu Jindal		
2023	Crime Patrol 48 hours	Police Inspector	started from 10 July on Sony TV.	
2024	Crime Patrol - City Crimes	Police Inspector	started from 16 July	

=== Web series ===
Year	Series	Role	Network	Ref(s)
2022	Suranga	Jaywanth	Atrangii	

== Theatre ==
Year	Play	Role	Place	Ref(s)
2018	Devdas – The Musical Play	Chunnilal/Narayandas	NCPA, Mumbai	
