= That Game of Chess =

- Directed by: Raja Bundela
- Written by: Viresh Sinha; Oge Madekwe
- Produced by: Sunny Bedi; Bonnie Klein; Amresh Sinha; Viresh Sinha
- Starring: Viresh Sinha; Melanie Malia; Alok Nath; Cazzy Golomb
- Cinematography: Armand Gazarian; John O'Shaughnessy
- Edited by: Chris Worland
- Music by: Jason Solowsky
- Production company: Madan Prem Entertainment
- Release date: 3 April 2009
- Running time: 93 minutes
- Country: United States
- Language: English

That Game of Chess is a 2009 American drama film directed by Raja Bundela, starring Viresh Sinha, Melanie Malia, Alok Nath and Cazzy Golomb.

== Cast ==
- Viresh Sinha as Rahul
- Melanie Malia as Sarah
- Alok Nath as Father
- Cazzy Golomb as Elena
- Raja Bundela as Raj Bedi
- Spencer Scott as Tony

== Release ==
The film was released on 3 April 2009.

== Reception ==
Gary Goldstein of the Los Angeles Times wrote that the film is "so unconvincingly played and poorly crafted that it's checkmate from the first move."

David Chute of LA Weekly wrote that "the film displays no zest or inventiveness whatsoever, though the actors manage, most of the time, to read their dialog audibly."

Mark Keizer of Boxoffice rated the film 0.5 stars out of 5 and wrote that the film is "just too silly for any serious discussion other than how Sinha plans to live now that’s blown his life savings on a movie this bad."
