= Anjaane =

- Film Poster
- Directed by: Harry W. Fernandes
- Produced by: Anil K. Mehta
- Starring: Manisha Koirala; Sanjay Kapoor; Tejaswini Kolhapure; Helen; Tanwi Gouri Mehta; Anand Mehta
- Cinematography: Rajan Kinagi
- Music by: Himesh Reshammiya
- Release date: 30 December 2005
- Running time: 110 minutes
- Country: India
- Language: Hindi
- Budget: ₹1.50 crore
- Box office: ₹13.50 lakh

Anjaane: The Unknown is a 2005 Indian Hindi-language horror film starring Manisha Koirala, Sanjay Kapoor, Tejaswini Kolhapure and Helen. Directed by Harry W. Fernandes, the film is based on Alejandro Amenábar's film The Others, which was already remade in Hindi and released as Hum Kaun Hai? with Amitabh Bachchan and Dimple Kapadia in 2004.

== Plot ==
Aaditi and Aditya are a married couple with two children. They are wealthy and live in a mansion. Their idyllic life is shattered with the arrival of Sonia, who has an affair with Aditya. Eventually, Aditya leaves his family for Sonia, leaving the wife and two kids alone. When it is found out that Sonia is barren, Aditya demands custody of his children from Shivani and approaches the courts for a custody battle. Eventually, the courts ruled against Shivani and awarded custody to Aditya and Sonia. The movie changes its ambiance from the family dispute to one of suspense and horror shortly after.

== Cast ==
- Manisha Koirala as aaditi
- Sanjay Kapoor as Aditya Malhotra
- Tejaswini Kolhapure as soniya
- Helen
- Tanwi Gouri Mehta
- Anand Mehta
- Ekta Jain as vakil

== Soundtrack ==
Anjaane

Soundtrack album by Himesh Reshammiya
- Released: 2005
- Genre: Feature film soundtrack
- Language: Hindi
- Producer: Himesh Reshammiya

Himesh Reshammiya chronology
Vaah! Life Ho Toh Aisi! (2005)	Anjaane (2005)	Aksar (2006)

1. "Kis Kadar Chahate Hai Ham Tumko Sanam" - Alka Yagnik, Jayesh Gandhi
2. "De Do Re De Do" - Jayesh Gandhi, Sunidhi Chauhan
3. "O Maahive Re O Maahive" - Alka Yagnik, Udit Narayan
4. "O Soni Re O Sayyoni Re" - K. K., Sapna Mukherjee
5. "Anjaane" - Kunal Ganjawala
6. "Mummy Cool Cool" - Baby Mohini Roy, Master Sohail
