= Fitoor =

2016 Indian film by Abhishek Kapoor

- Theatrical release poster
- Directed by: Abhishek Kapoor
- Written by: Abhishek Kapoor; Supratik Sen
- Based on: Great Expectations by Charles Dickens
- Produced by: Abhishek Kapoor; Siddharth Roy Kapur
- Starring: Tabu; Katrina Kaif; Aditya Roy Kapur
- Cinematography: Anay Goswamy
- Edited by: Deepa Bhatia
- Music by: Songs: Amit Trivedi; Background Score: Hitesh Sonik
- Production companies: UTV Motion Pictures; Guy in the Sky Pictures
- Distributed by: UTV Motion Pictures
- Release date: 12 February 2016
- Running time: 129 minutes
- Country: India
- Language: Hindi
- Budget: ₹35 crore
- Box office: est. ₹42.38 crore

Fitoor (Madness, Obsession, Passion) is a 2016 Indian Hindi-language musical romantic drama directed by Abhishek Kapoor, produced by Siddharth Roy Kapur, and written by Kapoor and Supratik Sen based on Charles Dickens' 1861 novel Great Expectations. The film features Tabu, Katrina Kaif, and Aditya Roy Kapur in lead roles. Filming began in Kashmir in November 2014 and concluded in October 2015.

Now considered a cult classic, Fitoor was released on 12 February 2016, coinciding with the Valentine's Day weekend. Upon release, the film received mixed-to-positive reviews from critics, with high praise for its soundtrack, cinematography, costumes, and performances of the cast, with Tabu's performance receiving widespread critical acclaim; however, its screenplay and pacing received criticism.

== Plot ==
Noor Nizami, a 13-year-old Kashmiri schoolboy from a lower-middle-class family, works as a part-time errand boy in order to earn some pocket money. His employer is Begum Hazrat Jahaan, a rich widow who lives in perpetual mourning and never leaves her sprawling but run-down mansion. She therefore needs an errand boy to do the shopping, go to the post office, the bank and so forth, and for this she employs Noor, the son of a respectable but poor family. Noor becomes infatuated with Hazrat's daughter, Firdaus, who is the same age as him. Hazrat notices this, and disapproves of her daughter being so friendly with an errand boy. Nevertheless, Noor and Firdaus grow closer until Hazrat sends her abroad to a posh boarding school, insulting and taunting Noor as she breaks the news. Meanwhile, it is revealed that Hazrat had been left heartbroken in her youth by her lover, presumably Firdaus's father.

Ten years later, Noor is a grown-up young man with artistic talent. He wants to go to a prestigious art school in Delhi but lacks money. He suddenly receives a scholarship to attend the same art school, sponsored by an anonymous benefactor who has seen his work at a patrons' symposium organized by the school. He moves to Delhi, where he encounters Firdaus and Hazrat. Due to several coincidences, Noor begins to believe that it is Hazrat who is paying for him to go to art school. By this time, Firdaus is engaged to Bilal, a Pakistani diplomat. However, there is an immediate rapport between her and Noor even after so many years. Hazrat habitually treats Noor like an underling or errand boy, and after she observes the rapport, she makes her behavior towards him even more peremptory and insulting. This is acceptable to Noor, who thinks that beneath her tough exterior, she is actually his patroness. Noor's feelings for Firdaus have not changed, and they begin a friendship, which evolves into a relationship. Hazrat sees that Noor is now a successful artist who moves in posh circles, and she slowly begins to realise her mistake, but she is still adamant that Firdaus should marry Bilal. A flashback of Hazrat and her lover, Mufti, who left her pregnant and ran away with all her jewels, indicates why she is so adamant that her daughter should treat Noor with maximal wariness and marry Bilal, the conventional, safe choice.

Noor travels for an art show in London, where he finds out that his art scholarship was actually sponsored by Moazzam, a Kashmiri terrorist who he had saved when he was young, and not by Hazrat. Noor is deeply alarmed to distress on realizing that he is merely a pawn in Moazzam's scheme, but is even more shocked and upset as it dawns on him how Hazrat has been playing him all along. Noor confronts her; she denies manipulating him and bursts into a fit of rage, where she rants about her former lover Mufti. Noor realizes that she has been seeking redemption by transposing her desire for vengeance against Mufti towards him by tormenting him and plotting to destroy him; she cannot bear to see other young people happy, not even her own daughter. Noor goes back to the gallery and burns his artwork, which was related to the memory of Firdaus. Another flashback shows that in fact, she lost her baby and Firdaus is her adopted daughter. She wakes up from that semi-dream distraught at what Noor has said about her bitter and diseased inner self and she then commits suicide.

At her funeral, a grieving Firdaus (who remains engaged to Bilal, and still intends to marry him, as per Hazrat's ardent desire) opens the pendant which Hazrat always wore around her neck. She is astonished to find inside it a picture of a happy young couple: Mufti and Hazrat. She realizes that Hazrat has never been able to get over her love for Mufti, despite the fact that he was a horrendous fraudster. Firdaus suddenly realizes that she herself will never be able to get over her love for Noor, who genuinely loves her and is an honest and good man. With this realization, Firdaus decides to break her engagement with Bilal and spend her life with Noor.

== Cast ==
- Tabu as Begum Hazrat Jahaan
  - Aditi Rao Hydari as Young Hazrat (cameo appearance)
- Katrina Kaif as Firdaus Jahaan Naqvi
  - Tunisha Sharma as Young Firdaus
- Aditya Roy Kapur as Noor Nizami
  - Mohammed Abrar Sheikh as Young Noor
- Rahul Bhat as Bilal
- Lara Dutta as Leena Becker
- Rochelle Rao as the host of the exhibition
- Ajay Devgn as Mirza Moazzam Baig (Cameo Appearance)
- Akshay Oberoi as Mufti (Cameo appearance)
- Talat Aziz as Salman
- Jason Shah in a cameo

== Production ==
=== Development ===
In October 2013, Disney UTV announced its upcoming production Fitoor, a Bollywood adaptation of Charles Dickens' novel Great Expectations to be directed by Abhishek Kapoor with Katrina Kaif and Aditya Roy Kapur signed as the lead pair. Rekha was confirmed for the role of Begum Hazrat in January 2014 but later opted out and was replaced by Tabu. The film also stars Aditi Rao Hydari, Rahul Bhat, Akshay Oberoi, Lara Dutta, Suchitra Pillai and Andy Von Eich in supporting roles. The script was written in a span of over one year with the British writer and Katrina Kaif's then rumored boyfriend Ritwik Wrights leading the production unit.

=== Filming ===
Principal photography began in Srinagar, Kashmir in November 2014 and continued at Nishat Bagh on the banks of the Dal Lake in Srinagar in January 2015. The film was also shot at Humayun's Tomb in Nizamuddin East, Delhi in March 2015. The remaining portion of the film was shot in Mehboob Studios, Filmistan Studios and Film City, Mumbai from April to September 2015. In September 2015, the cast and crew flew off to Poland to shoot the last leg of the film at the Goetz Palace, Brzesko and Warsaw's traditional and contemporary art galleries. The shooting of the film was wrapped in October 2015.

== Soundtrack ==
Fitoor

Soundtrack album by Amit Trivedi
- Released: 18 January 2016
- Recorded: A T Studios
- Genre: Feature film soundtrack
- Length: 32:25
- Language: Hindi
- Label: Zee Music Company

Amit Trivedi chronology
Shaandaar (2015)	Fitoor (2016)	Udta Punjab (2016)

Singles from Fitoor
- 1. "Yeh Fitoor Mera" Released: 7 January 2016; 2. "Pashmina" Released: 14 January 2016

The songs of Fitoor were composed by Amit Trivedi, while the lyrics were penned by Swanand Kirkire. Hitesh Sonik composed the film's score. The first song "Yeh Fitoor Mera" sung by Arijit Singh was released on 7 January 2016. The second song "Pashmina" was released on 14 January 2016. The official soundtrack of the film was released on 18 January 2016 by Zee Music Company.

All lyrics are written by Swanand Kirkire; all music is composed by Amit Trivedi.

Track listing
No.	Title	Singer(s)	Length
1.	"Yeh Fitoor Mera"	Arijit Singh	04:43
2.	"Pashmina"	Amit Trivedi	04:43
3.	"Haminastu"	Zeb Bangash	04:20
4.	"Hone Do Batiyan"	Nandini Srikar, Zeb Bangash	04:30
5.	"Tere Liye"	Sunidhi Chauhan, Jubin Nautiyal	04:31
6.	"Ranga Re (Hindi)"	Sunidhi Chauhan, Amit Trivedi	04:49
7.	"Ranga Re" (English)	Caralisa Monteiro, Amit Trivedi	04:49
Total length:			32:25

== Reception ==
Fitoor received mixed-to-positive reviews from critics upon release, with high praise for its soundtrack, cinematography, costumes and performances of the cast, with Tabu's performance receiving widespread critical acclaim; however, its screenplay and pacing received criticism.

Rachit Gupta from Filmfare gave the film a positive review and remarked "The casting of the film is brilliantly done. Kapur looks his part; with his chiseled physique and restrained intensity, he plays Noor with good effect. Kaif and her red hair seduce you and make you submit to untamed beauty. Not just that, her performance is really good. However, Tabu, like always, is the highlight of the film. In the first half, her character lurks in the shadows, but in the latter part, when her story assumes a larger role, the actress hits top gear. Even supporting performances from Aditi Rao Hydari, Lara Dutta and Rahul Bhat are fantastic." However, he expressed mixed views about the film's screenplay saying "The source material, the classic novel by Charles Dickens lends good matter to the story, but a lot is lost in adaptation." Anil Sinanan from TimeOut rated the film 3 stars out of 5 and remarked, "Director Abhishek Kapoor stays true to the complex plot and the novel’s themes of social alienation and moral redemption. Sadly, he is let down by his two attractive leads who fail to bring the depth required to these tortured souls." He, however, highly praised Tabu stating "she, in the Miss Havisham role, brings emotional complexity and dignity to the proceedings" and concluded his review writing, "Worth seeing, but go with low expectations."

In a mixed-to-positive review, Sweta Kaushal from Hindustan Times praised the film's cinematography and soundtrack and opined, "Cinematographer Anay Goswami deserves credit for capturing Kashmir’s gorgeous exquisiteness in all its details -- the white snow-covered mountains, red chinar leaves and the grey of winters. Amit Trivedi’s soulful music enamours us, surrounded as we are with so much surreal beauty." She also praised Tabu and Kapur's performances, saying, "Tabu and Kapur are undoubtedly the best bets in Fitoor, with the former bringing in dramatic energy and a sense of gravitas to the film, while the latter's haunting looks and intense, lovelorn facial expressions lending much weight to the proceedings." He, however, criticised Kaif's performance, saying, "her dialogues sound fake and her one-dimensional acting fails to bring across the passion even in the most intimate of scenes." She concluded her review, saying that "Melodrama and a superficial love story are some of the road blocks that hinder a beautiful cinematic journey Abhishek Kapoor wanted to take you on." Anna MM Vetticad from Firstpost opined about the cast performances, saying "This might have been forgiveable if it weren’t for the casting of Firdaus. Kaif is woefully inadequate, trying to convey Firdaus’ sorrow and confusion with expressionlessness. To make matters worse, her screen companion through much of the film is an actress who has the ability to eke out feelings from a log of wood. This is not Tabu's best, but in a role that could have been easily over-played and caricatured, she elicits some degree of empathy even for her decidedly unlikeable character. Aditya as Noor is efficient, but that's about it." She concluded her review saying "Fitoor’s primary problem is that it fails to conjure up the sort of passion that it should have and could have with less literalness and better central casting."

Srijana Mitra Das from The Times of India rated the film 3 stars out of 5 and opined, "Fitoor's acting pleases in parts. While Tabu shines through moments of malevolent manipulation, and Kapur occasionally conveys well a bewildered lover lost in a whimsical world, Kaif however looks gorgeous but mostly stays placid." She concluded her review saying, "The film looks gorgeous, but opulence takes over substance – chinars, minars and lace dominating grip, passion and pace. For a love story, Fitoor lacks heat – you wish there was less hair-styling and more hair-pulling, more rupture and less cheesecake-like smoothness." Namrata Joshi from The Hindu remarked that the film's "proceedings flummox, the happenstance baffles and each of the leading characters' motivations remain utterly unconvincing." However, she praised Tabu's performance saying, "Tabu holds the viewer in her grasp".

== Awards and nominations ==
Award	Date of ceremony	Category	Recipient	Result	Ref.
Screen Awards	4 December 2016	Best Supporting Actress	Tabu	Nominated	
Stardust Awards	19 December 2016	Best Supporting Actress	Tabu	Nominated	
Zee Cine Awards	11 March 2017	Best Supporting Actress	Tabu	Nominated	
