= Raja Bundela =

Indian actor and politician

- Born: Lalitpur, Uttar Pradesh, India
- Occupations: Actor, producer, politician
- Political party: BJP
- Other political affiliations: INC; Bundelkhand Mukti Morcha; Bundelkhand Congress
- Spouse: Sushmita Mukherjee

Raj Rajeshwar Pratap Singh Judev also known as Raja Bundela is an Indian actor, producer, politician and civil activist.Presently He is the Vice President of Bundelkhand Vikas Board, Uttar Pradesh. In films, he is notable for appearances in Swarg, Shola Aur Shabnam, Pratha, Namestey LA, and Son of Flower.he became a politician interested in civil rights and statehood for his native Bundelkhand in India.

== Personal life ==
Raja Rajeshwar Pratap Singh Judev, fondly known as Raja Bundela was born in Lalitpur, Uttar Pradesh. Raja Bundela was born to one of the Royal houses of the Lalitpur district. He is an alumnus of National School of Drama passing out in 1977. He married Sushmita Mukherjee in 1993. The couple has been blessed with two sons, Rudransh Bundela and Rudranuj Bundela.

== Political career ==
Bundela is Vice President of Bundelkhand Vikas Board, Uttar Pradesh Gov Bundela was president of Bundelkhand Mukti Morcha which is campaigning for the creation of a separate Bundelkhand state comprising 15 districts of Uttar Pradesh and Madhya Pradesh.

In the Lok Sabha elections 2004, Bundela stood on an Indian National Congress ticket in Jhansi, the putative capital of Bundelkhand. He got 104 584 votes (12.76%).

In August 2011, he formed Bundelkhand Congress with a single point agenda of creating a separate Bundelkhand state which includes parts from today part of Uttar Pradesh and Madhya Pradesh. The party made an alliance with the Peace Party of India and Apna Dal in the 2012 Uttar Pradesh legislative assembly election but failed to make an impact.

Bundela joined Bharatiya Janata Party in presence of senior party leaders in 2013.

In early 2026, Bundela reignited the debate surrounding Bundelkhand statehood by proposing that electoral delimitation could serve as a catalyst for renewed political mobilization on the issue.

== Filmography ==
=== Actor ===
- Vijeta (1982)
- Star (1982)
- Ab Ayega Mazaa (1984)
- Arjun (1985)
- Mhara Peehar Sasra (1985)
- Ankush (1986)
- Swati (1986)
- Yeh Woh Manzil To Nahin (1987)
- Main Azaad Hoon (1989)
- Swarg (1990)
- Shadyantra (1990)
- Phaagan Aaya Re (Haryanvi Film) (1991)
- Shola Aur Shabnam (1992)
- Police Officer(1992)
- Paramaatma (1994)
- Sautela Bhai (1996)
- 23rd March 1931: Shaheed (2002)
- That Game of Chess (2005)
- Sirf Romance: Love by Chance (2007)
- Do Knot Disturb (2009)
- Happy Phirr Bhag Jayegi (2018)

=== Director ===
- Pratha (2002)
- That Game of Chess (2005)
- Sirf Romance: Love by Chance (2007)
- Son of Flower (2012)
- Dil Toh Deewana Hai (2016)

=== Producer ===
- Pratha (2002)

== Television ==
- Mujhe Chaand Chahiye (Zee TV)
- Bible Ki Kahaniya (Doordarshan)
- Babul Ka Aangann Chootey Na (Sony)
- Tara Rohit Seth (Zee TV)
- Aahat (Sony)
- Farmaan (Doordarshan)
