= Paanch =

- Theatrical poster
- Directed by: Anurag Kashyap
- Written by: Anurag Kashyap
- Produced by: Padmini Kolhapure (presenter); Tutu Sharma; Jaydev Banerjee
- Starring: Kay Kay Menon; Aditya Srivastava; Vijay Maurya; Joy Fernandes; Tejaswini Kolhapure
- Cinematography: Natty Subramaniam
- Edited by: Aarti Bajaj
- Music by: Vishal Bhardwaj
- Production company: Padmini Films
- Release date: 2003 (Filmfest Hamburg)
- Running time: 130 minutes
- Country: India
- Language: Hindi

Paanch (transl. Five) is a 2003 Indian crime thriller film written and directed by Anurag Kashyap in his directing debut, starring Kay Kay Menon, Aditya Srivastava, Vijay Maurya, Joy Fernandes, and Tejaswini Kolhapure. The film is loosely based on the 1976–77 Joshi-Abhyankar serial murders in Pune.

Paanch did not receive a theatrical or home-video release. The Central Board of Film Certification raised objections due to the film's violence, depiction of drug abuse, and use of strong language. After some cuts, the film was cleared by the Central Board of Film Certification in 2001. However, despite the director's protests, it was not approved for release. The story was considered too disturbing for the general public, and the production lacked the budget for reshoots. Paanch was later made available through torrent websites and screened at several film festivals.

== Plot ==
A kidnapping plot goes awry when four friends plan to kidnap their own friend, who is accidentally killed.

== Cast ==
- Kay Kay Menon as Luke Morrison
- Aditya Srivastava as Murgi
- Vijay Maurya as Pondy
- Joy Fernandes as Joy
- Tejaswini Kolhapure as Shiuli
- Sharat Saxena as Inspector Deshpande
- Pankaj Saraswat as Nikhil Ranjan
- Vijay Raaz as Anish Ranjan
- Abhinav Kashyap as Police Salam

== Soundtrack ==
The soundtrack of the film features music composed by Vishal Bhardwaj and lyrics written by Abbas Tyrewala. Released by BMG Crescendo in May 2002, the album marked the company's entry into the Hindi film music market.

No.	Title	Length
1.	"Main Khuda" (performed by K.K.)	6:06
2.	"Ye Kaisa Hai Shaher" (performed by Dominique)	4:22
3.	"Paka Mat" (performed by Hariharan and K.K.)	4:38
4.	"Paanch Theme" (performed by Dominique)	2:49
5.	"Ankhiyan Chipki" (performed by Ustad Sultan Khan)	4:20
6.	"Jism Hai" (performed by Asha Bhosle)	3:31
7.	"Tamas" (performed by Deva Sen Gupta)	4:31
8.	"Main Khuda" (performed by Sunidhi Chauhan)	4:36

== Production ==
In September 1993, Anurag Kashyap stayed at the St. Xavier's Boys Hostel, where he spent time with Adam Avil, Eddie Avil, Luke Kenny, and Ulysses Veyra, members of a band initially named Greek, later renamed Pralay. He documented their daily activities in a small notebook, filling forty pages. These notes served as the foundation for a script he began writing in fragments for a film initially titled Mirage, which eventually became Paanch. Kashyap had previously seen former VJ Luke Kenny perform in a play directed by Vikram Kapadia. Impressed by Kenny’s performance, Kashyap approached him with a partially completed script, but the collaboration did not materialize. During his collaboration with Nair, Kashyap discovered files related to the Joshi-Abhyankar Serial Murders, a series of ten murders committed in Pune in 1976.

"Five very ordinary college kids viciously murdered nine people. I got what I needed to finish my script then."

== Release ==
Paanch was screened at several film festivals, including Filmfest Hamburg in 2003, Osian's Cinefan Festival of Asian and Arab Cinema as the closing film in 2005, the Indian Film Festival of Los Angeles in 2006, and the Jagran Film Festival in 2016.
