= Tum Dena Saath Mera (2009 TV series) =

- Genre: Drama
- Written by: Rahul Bhat & Sanjeev Kaul
- Directed by: Rahul Bhat
- Creative director: Ajay Jadhav
- Starring: See below
- Theme music composer: Naqsh Lyallpuri & Prakash Nar
- Opening theme: "Tum Dena Saath Mera" by Jaspinder Narula
- Country of origin: India
- Original language: Hindi
- No. of seasons: 1

Production
- Executive producers: Sham Chavan & Anuradha Anand Lunavar
- Producers: Rahul Bhat & Sharika Sharma Bhat
- Cinematography: Pravin Salian
- Editor: Sumit Shah
- Camera setup: Multi-camera
- Running time: Approx. 24 minutes
- Production company: Film Tonic Entertainment

Original release
- Network: DD National
- Release: 23 November 2010 – 2010

Tum Dena Saath Mera is a Hindi language Indian television drama series which premiered on 4 January 2010 on DD National. The series is produced by television actor, Rahul Bhat and focuses on the life of physically challenged people.

== Plot ==
The story revolves around the life of a blind girl, Simran who falls in love with a mute boy, Samarjeet, her childhood friend.

== Cast ==
- Piku Sharma ... Simran
- Amit ... Samarjeet
- Gajendra Chauhan ... Gurnam Singh (Simran's father)
- Rajeev Verma...Manjinder Singh (Manjeet)
- Hemant Chadha ... Lakhwinder Singh
- Aarti Puri ... Rani
- Supriya Karnik ... (Simran's sister)
