= Rahul Bhat =

Indian actor

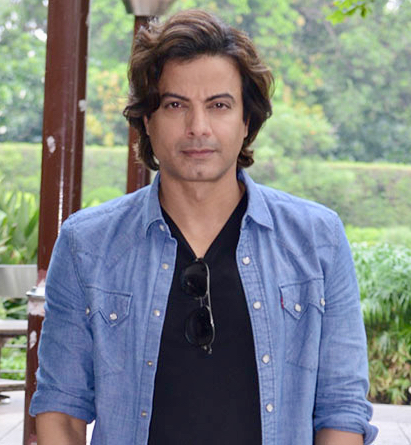
- Bhat in 2019
- Born: Srinagar, Jammu and Kashmir, India
- Occupations: Actor, producer
- Years active: 1998—present

Rahul Bhat is an Indian actor who works in Hindi films. He began his career as a fashion model and participated in the Graviera Mr. India contest in 1998, and subsequently worked in several advertisements and music videos. He gained fame for his leading role in the television serial Heena from 1998 to 2003. After starring in the films Yeh Mohabbat Hai (2002) and Nayee Padosan (2003), he took a sabbatical from acting and began producing television serials, including Meri Doli Tere Angana (2007–2008) and Tum Dena Saath Mera (2009).

Bhat made his acting comeback with a leading role in Anurag Kashyap's thriller film Ugly (2013), for which he received critical acclaim. He has since appeared in Fitoor (2016), Daas Dev (2018), Section 375 (2019), and Kashyap’s Dobaaraa (2022), and Kennedy (2023). In 2025, he starred in the Netflix thriller series Black Warrant.

== Life and career ==
=== Early life and work ===
Bhat was born in Srinagar, Jammu and Kashmir, India into a Kashmiri Pandit family.

Bhat began his career as a fashion model. In 1998, he participated in the Graviera Mr. India contest, where he won the Mr Photogenic award. He did advertisements for Pond's and Breeze detergent, and appeared in music videos like "Soni Lag Gayee" with Pakistani singer Sajjad Ali, and "Punjabi Munda" for Tips Industries. He gained popularity for his role in Heena, a soap opera on Sony Entertainment Television, which aired for five years from 1998 to 2003.

Bhat had his first film role in the romantic drama Yeh Mohabbat Hai in 2002, directed by Umesh Mehra. The film was not well received, but Priyanka Bhattacharya of Rediff.com found him “sincere” and Taran Adarsh of Bollywood Hungama opined that he had made a “decent debut”. The following year, he starred in the comedy Nayee Padosan, in which he played dual roles of a Tamil man and a don.

Disillusioned with the kind of roles he was being offered, Bhat took a sabbatical from acting. He instead began his own production company Filmtonic Entertainment, under which he produced television soap operas such as Meri Doli Tere Angana (2007–2008), Chhukar Mere Man Ko (2007), and Tum Dena Saath Mera (2009). He has said about this period, "I quit acting because I was angry. I did not want to do B and C grade projects. I wanted to work on good scripts and with committed filmmakers. But nothing came my way and that made me unhappy."

=== Return to acting ===
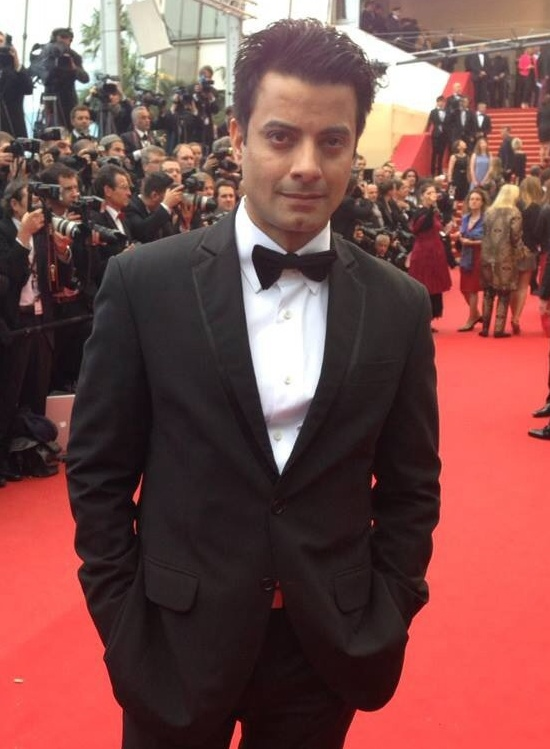
Bhat at the premiere of Ugly at the 2013 Cannes Film Festival

The filmmaker Anurag Kashyap approached Bhat to play the part of a struggling actor whose daughter is kidnapped in his thriller film Ugly (2013). To prepare for his role, Bhat started consuming alcohol heavily and deprived himself of sleep to create dark circles around his character's face. For a sequence, where Bhat had to cry, Kashyap kept talking to him for three hours and he eventually broke down and wept. The camera kept rolling during that period. Ugly premiered in the Directors' Fortnight section of the 2013 Cannes Film Festival where it received standing ovation. It was also screened at the New York Indian Film Festival and the Indian Film Festival of Los Angeles. Arunava Chatterjee of India Today called Ugly a "pathbreaking crime fiction" and found Bhat to be “outstanding” in it. Brian Clark of Screen Anarchy added that Bhat "does especially impressive work transitioning his character through some demanding plot twists and power shifts".

Three years later in 2016, Bhat played a role opposite Katrina Kaif in the romantic drama Fitoor and alongside Priyanka Chopra in the crime film Jai Gangaajal. In a review for the latter film, Srijana Mitra Das of The Times of India wrote that even in a small role, he had played his character's "radicalism with aplomb".

The following year, Bhat had a leading role in Union Leader, an Indian-Canadian drama about a chemical factory supervisor who raises the issue of worker's health and safety against an unsympathetic management. Anna M. M. Vetticad wrote that Bhat had brought an "X factor to his performance" which exceeded the screenplay's limitations.

Bhat starred in Sudhir Mishra’s romantic drama Daas Dev (2018), a retelling of Sarat Chandra Chattopadhyay's novel Devdas set in the political landscape of Uttar Pradesh, in which he played the lead role opposite Aditi Rao Hydari and Richa Chaddha. In 2019, he appeared alongside Chaddha and Akshaye Khanna in the courtroom drama Section 375. He played a Bollywood director accused of rape. Rajeev Masand wrote that he “does well as the arrogant director”.

In 2021, Bhat starred in Man Naked, an experimental single-shot short film. Bhat reunited with Anurag Kashyap in 2022, in Dobaaraa, a remake of the Spanish mystery film Mirage, starring Taapsee Pannu. Anupama Chopra found Bhat's to be the "most notable character" in the film and added that his "frayed good looks and exhausted manner infuse a much-needed comic edge into the film". He collaborated once again with Kashyap in the crime film Kennedy, which premiered at the 2023 Cannes Film Festival.

Bhat starred in Netflix thriller series Black Warrant in 2025, playing DSP Rajesh Tomar, a senior jailer at Tihar jail. Shubhra Gupta of The Indian Express termed it his most "worthy role" since Ugly. Scroll.in's Nandini Ramnath wrote that he "superbly portrays Tomar’s concentrated perversion".

== Filmography ==
Year	Film	Role	Notes
2002	Yeh Mohabbat Hai	Chaand Nawaab	
2003	Nayee Padosan	Prabhu	
2013	Ugly	Rahul Kapoor	
2016	Fitoor	Bilal	
2016	Jai Gangaajal	Pawan	
2017	Union Leader	Jay Gohil	
2018	Daas Dev	Devdas	
2019	Section 375	Rohan Khurana	
2021	Man Naked	Ronnie	Short film
2022	Dobaaraa	Vikas Awasthi	
2023	Kennedy	Uday Shetty / Kennedy	

=== Television ===
Year	Show	Role	Notes
1997	Jai Hanuman	Sujuti	
1998–2003	Heena	Sameer	
2002	Draupadi	Krishna	
2007–2008	Meri Doli Tere Angana	–	Producer
2007	Chhukar Mere Man Ko	–	Producer
2009	Tum Dena Saath Mera	–	Producer
2025	Black Warrant	DSP Rajesh Tomar	
2025	Crime Beat	Binny Chaudhary	
