= Chromium sulfate =

Chromium sulfate may refer to:

- Chromium(II) sulfate
- Chromium(III) sulfate
