= Dobaaraa =

2022 Indian science fiction film

- Theatrical release poster
- Directed by: Anurag Kashyap
- Screenplay by: Nihit Bhave
- Based on: Mirage by Oriol Paulo
- Produced by: Shobha Kapoor; Ekta Kapoor; Sunit Khetrapal; Gaurav Bose
- Starring: Taapsee Pannu; Pavail Gulati
- Cinematography: Sylvester Fonseca
- Edited by: Aarti Bajaj
- Music by: Gaurav Chatterji; Shor Police; Jakub Grzechowiak
- Production companies: Cult Movies; Athena; Vermillion World
- Distributed by: Pen Marudhar Entertainment
- Release dates: 23 June 2022 (London Indian Film Festival); 19 August 2022 (India)
- Running time: 132 minutes
- Country: India
- Language: Hindi
- Budget: ₹30 crore
- Box office: est. ₹6.77 crore

Dobaaraa (transl. Second time / 2:12), also stylized as 2:12, is a Hindi-language science-fiction mystery thriller film directed by Anurag Kashyap. The film stars Taapsee Pannu, Pavail Gulati and Rahul Bhat.

Dobaaraa is an official remake of the 2018 Spanish film Mirage. It opened the London Indian Film Festival 2022 and was theatrically released on 19 August 2022 and opened to highly positive reviews from critics. However, the film was a box-office bomb.

== Plot ==
A woman gets an opportunity to save the life of a 12-year-old boy, who accidentally witnessed a death during a thunderstorm that happened 25 years ago, by getting connected through the television set during a similar storm in the present. What happens ahead is slowly unraveled by her with the help of a police officer with a mysterious past.

== Cast ==
- Taapsee Pannu as Antara Awasthi/Dr. Antara Vasishth, Anay's love interest and Vikas's wife
- Pavail Gulati as Anay Anand, Antara's love interest
  - Aarrian Sawant as Young Anay
- Nassar as Dr. Sethupathi
- Rahul Bhat as Vikas Awasthi, Antara's Husband
- Sukant Goel as Abhishek
  - Shaurya Duggal as Young Abhishek
- Saswata Chatterjee as Raja Ghosh
- Vidushi Mehra as Shikha Vats
- Himanshi Choudhry as Sheela
- Nidhi Singh as Bhavna Awasthi
- Madhurima Roy as Sarah Kunder, Vikas's Girlfriend
- Myra Rajpal as Avanti Awasthi
- Medini Kelamane as Rujuta Ghosh
- Priti Shroff as Hospital Nurse
- Rahul Tewari as Police Inspector

== Soundtrack ==
Dobaaraa

Soundtrack album by Gaurav Chatterji and Shor Police
- Released: 19 August 2022
- Recorded: 2021
- Genre: Feature film soundtrack
- Length: 17:30
- Language: Hindi
- Label: Saregama Music

The music of the film is composed by Gaurav Chatterji and Shor Police. Lyrics are written by Hussain Haidry. The background score is composed by Shor Police.

Tracklist
No.	Title	Singer(s)	Length
1.	"Waqt ke Jungle"	Armaan Malik	3:14
2.	"Veham"	Fotty Seven	3:20
3.	"Dariya Hai" (Music by Shor Police)	Clinton Cerejo, Bianca Gomes	3:06
4.	"Pari"	Neeti Mohan	4:20
5.	"Pari" (Reprise)	Gaurav Chatterji	3:30
Total length:			17:30

== Reception ==
=== Critical response ===
Dobaaraa received positive reviews from critics with praise for the direction, screenplay and performances. On the review aggregator website Rotten Tomatoes, 73% of 11 critics' reviews are positive, with an average rating of 5.3/10.

Rohit Vats of DNA India rated the film 5 out of 5 stars and wrote, "Dobaaraa is fast, dark, exciting, disruptive and has a multi-layered storytelling." Rohit Bhatnagar of The Free Press Journal rated the film 4 out of 5 stars and wrote, "Taapsee is a good performer. The plot is so interesting that you hardly get time to distract yourself." Amandeep Narang of ABP News rated the film 4 out of 5 stars and wrote, "For a film like Dobaaraa, you have to have a kind of mathematical exactitude on how to cut between timelines, set a standard pace, keep the plot relatable, interlace the story with music, and Anurag Kashyap manages to do exactly that." A critic for Outlook India rated the film 4 out of 5 stars and wrote, "Dobaaraa is an edge-of-the-seat, brainy remake, worth watching once." Rachana Dubey of The Times of India rated the film 3.5 out of 5 stars and wrote, "Dobaaraa is an engaging thriller which is worth your time. This one needs all your attention, so go dive in." Zinia Bandyopadhyay of News 18 rated the film 3.5 out of 5 stars and wrote, "Dobaaraa is a mad and whacky tale and is edge-of-the seat as a thriller. The film keeps you hooked, and thoroughly engaged, even with the constant back and forth in time."

Grace Cyril of India Today rated the film 3.5 out of 5 stars and wrote, "Dobaaraa is the kind of film that will have the audience putting together a jigsaw puzzle as they leave the theatres. And when they’ve done so, they’ll realise that Dobaaraa is just another level." Pratikshya Mishra of The Quint rated the film 3.5 out of 5 stars and wrote, "Dobaaraa delves into questions of consequences and the time-space continuum and through Taapsee Pannu’s extremely believable performance as the frazzled, yet determined, woman on a mission, the film remains gripping and entertaining." Namrata Thakker of Rediff rated the film 3.5 out of 5 stars and wrote, "Dobaaraa may seem confusing if you aren't exposed to the time travel genre, but Anurag Kashyap's film makes it the right time to get acquainted with the genre." IANS of rated the film 3.5 out of 5 stars and wrote, "Kashyap is able to both narrate a stellar story and flesh out his characters within two hours and 12 minutes."

Saibal Chatterjee of NDTV rated the film 3 out of 5 stars and wrote, "Director Anurag Kashyap gets much of it right even when the going isn't entirely smooth." Deepa Gahlot of Scroll.in rated the film 3 out of 5 stars and wrote, "Dobaaraa has a brisk pace, enough to guard against nit-picking. Kashyap’s version is actually more interesting and emotionally engaging than Mirage."

Anna M. M. Vetticad of Firstpost rated the firm 2.5 out of 5 stars and wrote, "Dobaaraa is moderately thrilling and in parts genuinely frightening, but lacks the rootedness and heft that has come to be associated with Anurag-ness." A critic for Pinkvilla rated the film 2 out of 5 stars and wrote, "Dobaaraa lags behind on the chills and thrills that one expects of a time travel-based thriller and misses out on creating the edge-of-the-seat atmosphere." Shubhra Gupta of The Indian Express rated the film 1.5 out of 5 stars and wrote, "Dobaaraa comes off too choppy and muddled. It’s hard to keep track of the many things happening in the time zones the movie slips in and out of." Monika Rawal Kukreja of The Hindustan Times stated, "Dobaaraa has a lot that's unsaid and needs to be understood and that's where the complicated and complex plot works." Anuj Kumar of The Hindu stated, "While Taapsee is at the top of her game, Anurag skillfully executes a more perceptive draft of the original Spanish mystery drama."

=== Box office ===
On its opening day, the film collected only ₹0.72 crore at the domestic box office.

As of 26 August 2022, the film collected ₹4.72 crore at the domestic box office.
