= Tejaswini Kolhapure =

Indian actress

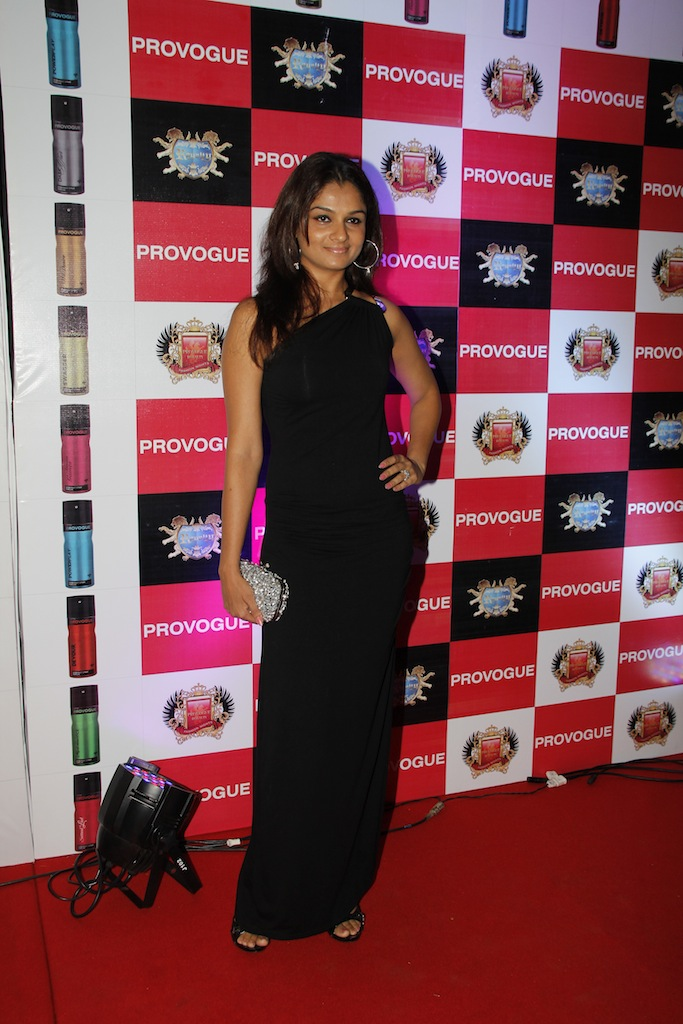
- Kolhapure in 2012
- Born: Mumbai, Maharashtra, India
- Occupations: Actress, model
- Spouse: Pankaj Saraswat
- Children: 1
- Relatives: See Mangeshkar-Hardikar-Abhisheki-Kolhapure family

Tejaswini Kolhapure is an Indian super model and actress.

== Personal life ==
Kolhapure was born in Mumbai in a Maharashtrian family. Her father, Pandharinath Kolhapure, was a classical singer whose family was from Kolhapur. She is the youngest sister of Shivangi Kolhapure (wife of Shakti Kapoor) and Padmini Kolhapure and mausi (maternal aunt) to Shraddha Kapoor.

She is the niece of singer Lata Mangeshkar, as her paternal grandmother was the half-sister of Deenanath Mangeshkar, Lata's father. Her mother, Nirupama Prabhu, had a job working for the airlines.

Kolhapure and her husband, Pankaj Saraswat, had a daughter in 2015.

== Career ==
Before she started her career with modelling and films, she made her debut with a television series, Mujhe Chaand Chahiye, directed by Raja Bundela on Zee TV. She appeared in the "Saughat" and "Tum Bin" episodes of the miniseries Rishtey on Zee TV. She was also involved in theatre.

She did a Modelling assignment in a Fashion Catalogue published by Krupa Kreations - Vimal N. Upadhyaya in the year of 1992. In same edition of this Catalogue, she was accompanied by Aishwarya Rai, Sonali Bendre and Niki Aneja.

Her first film made by Anurag Kashyap, Paanch, was not initially released. Paanch was delayed in its release due to problems with the depictions of violence, language and drug use in the film. Her appearance in Ugly was with the director, Kashyap, once more where she played a depressed young woman who was also an alcoholic. Kolhapure said that filming Ugly was a draining experience. The Hindustan Times wrote that "Kolhapure plays a battered wife and brings out the pain of a barren life perfectly."

=== Theatre ===
1999

- The Magic Pill directed by Satyadev Dubey
- Sabse Bada Thag directed by Makrand Deshpandey

2000

- Brahma Vishnu Mahesh directed by Satyadev Dubey.

2002

- Modh during the 'Prithvi Festival 2002' directed by Ahlam Khan

2005

- Beauty, Brains, & Personality directed by Vandana Sajnani

2007

- Flirt in Your Dreams directed by Satyadev Dubey

2008

- All About Women directed by Hidayat Sami

=== Short film ===
Year	Work	Role	Network	Notes
2007	Salt 'N' Pepper			short film

=== Films ===
Year	Title	Role	Notes
2003	Paanch	Shiuli	
2004	Stop!	Tina A. Mehra	
2005	Anjaane	Sonia	
2007	Salt & Pepper		
2008	Mumbai Cutting		
2010	Raavan	Dulari	
2010	Tequila Nights	Amrita Pathak	
2013	Boyss Toh Boyss Hain		
2014	Ugly	Shalini Bose	
2019	Happi		Special appearance
2024	Yes Papa		
