= Suresh Chavhanke =

Indian journalist (born 1972)

- Born: 18 February 1972 (age 54); Shirdi, Maharashtra, India
- Occupations: TV anchor; businessman
- Organization: Sudarshan News
- Website: sureshchavhanke.in

Suresh Chavhanke is an Indian journalist who is the current chairman, managing director and the editor-in-chief of Sudarshan News (Sudarshan TV Channel Limited), a Hindutva-aligned television channel. He is the anchor of its TV show Bindas Bol.

== Early life and career ==
Suresh Chavhanke is a member of Rashtriya Swayamsevak Sangh since the age of 3 years when he started attending its ceremonies. As a member of RSS, he had worked as a reporter of pro-RSS newspaper Tarun Bharat. He held several posts in RSS before becoming a full-time reporter. He launched Sudarshan News channel in 2005 in Pune, Maharashtra and later shifted it to Noida, Uttar Pradesh. He is currently the chairman, managing director and editor-in-chief of Sudarshan News. He hosts the show Bindas Bol.

== Legal issues and controversies ==
An FIR was lodged with Noida Police against Suresh Chavhanke for allegedly raping a former employee of his channel Sudarshan News in November 2016. He was booked by the police under 11 sections of the IPC; police had investigated the case but the charges were not substantiated as per the closure report filed by the police in January 2017. Yati Narsinghanand Saraswati, convener of the Akhil Bhartiya Sant Parishad, alleged that complainant was under influence of "jihadist" elements and claimed that they have solid proofs but can't disclose to media. Several organisations alleged that he was victimised because he stood up for "Hindu cause".

In April 2017, Chavhanke was booked and later arrested for inciting communal hatred between the Hindus and Muslimsts of Uttar Pradesh had registerecomplaint against Bindas Bol, hosted by Chavhanke and had alleged that it aired programmes that promoted communal disharmony and hostility between religious groups. Subsequently, Chavhanke was booked under various IPC sections and section 16 of the Cable Television Network (Regulation) Act, 1955 was also invoked. After being released on bail, he claimed that it was an attempt to "suppress and intimidate media".

In 2018, he started a Bharat Bachav rally allegedly to give a message on population control. The rally was interrupted by Hyderabad Police citing law and order problems created by the event.

In September 2020, Bindas Bol hosted by Chavhanke, aired a conspiracy termed "UPSC Jihad." The show claimed that Muslims were systematically "infiltrating" India's civil services, suggesting that Muslim candidates received undue advantages in the Union Public Service Commission (UPSC) examinations. These assertions were based on misleading data and unverified claims, including allegations of preferential treatment and undue benefits for Muslim aspirants.

The program faced widespread condemnation for promoting communal disharmony and spreading misinformation. Critics highlighted that the content was offensive and had the potential to promote communal attitudes. In response, the Ministry of Information and Broadcasting issued a caution to Sudarshan News, advising the channel to be more careful in the future and warning of stricter penal action in case of further violations. 91 retired Civil servants filed case against him claiming that his programme contains derogatory statements about the Muslim community and was divisive in nature, and the programme was paused by Allahabad High Court on 1 September 2020.

The Supreme Court of India also intervened, expressing concerns over the show's content and temporarily restraining the channel from airing further episodes. The court described the program as "insidious" and emphasized the need to balance freedom of the press with the responsibility to prevent communal discord.

In December 2021, Suresh Chavhanke, administered an oath at a Hindu Yuva Vahini event in Delhi, urging attendees to "fight," "die," and "kill if required" to establish a Hindu nation. This event sparked widespread criticism, with multiple complaints filed against him for hate speech and inciting communal tensions. Initially, the Delhi Police claimed that no hate speech occurred, but after Supreme Court intervention, they registered an FIR in May 2022. The police later informed the court that the investigation was in an advanced stage, awaiting a forensic voice sample analysis. Despite the legal action, Chavhanke has continued to defend his speech, claiming it was an expression of his ideological beliefs. Supreme Court of India criticized the delay in action and directed the Delhi Police to provide a more comprehensive affidavit on the matter. The case remains under investigation, with legal proceedings ongoing.
