= Sudarshan News =

Indian Hindi-language news channel (2005)

- Type: News channel
- Country: India
- Headquarters: A-84, Sector 57, Noida, Uttar Pradesh, India

Programming
- Language: Hindi
- Picture format: 16:9 576i (SDTV)

Ownership
- Owner: Suresh Chavhanke

History
- Launched: 9 August 2005

Links
- Webcast: Watch Live
- Website: sudarshannews.in

Availability

Streaming media
- Official Webcast: Watch Live
- Jio TV: Sudarshan News on Jio TV
- YouTube: Sudarshan News's channel on YouTube
- Shemaroo Me: Watch Live
- Distro TV: Watch Live

Sudarshan News is an Indian right-wing news channel. It was founded in 2005 by Suresh Chavhanke, the chairman and editor-in-chief. Chavhanke is a long-term member of the Hindutva organisation Rashtriya Swayamsevak Sangh (RSS), and had worked as a reporter of the pro-RSS newspaper Tarun Bharat. He held several posts in the RSS before becoming a full-time reporter. He launched Sudarshan News in 2005 in Pune, Maharashtra and later shifted it to Noida, Uttar Pradesh. He is currently the chairman, managing director and editor-in-chief of Sudarshan News and hosts its flagship TV show Bindas Bol. Chavhanke was also associated with the Akhil Bharatiya Vidyarthi Parishad, the student wing of RSS. He asserts that he practices ideology-driven journalism and prefers that the news programs on his channel be viewed as opinionated campaigns.

In August 2021, a 26 year old reporter from the channel, Manish Kumar Singh, was kidnapped and murdered in Bihar's East Champaran district. The police arrested three suspects out of which two were journalists, namely Amarendra Kumar and Mohammed Arshad Alam. Police sources said that they suspect a personal dispute to be the cause behind the murder. However the victim's father alleged the murder to be linked to Singh's journalism. In May 2024, another journalist from the channel, Ashutosh Srivastava was shot dead in Jaunpur, Uttar Pradesh. According to his family, the killing was linked to his coverage of the alleged slaughter of cows in the area.

The channel has been widely criticised for blatant anti-Muslim communal broadcasting and has been considered to be a part of pro-Modi government news outlets in India dubbed the "Godi media".

== Reception ==
In April 2017, Chavhanke was arrested for allegedly inciting communal hatred through multiple episodes of a flagship program. He secured bail two days later.

In 2020, Hemant Soren, the Chief Minister of Jharkhand, ordered state police to take action against Chavhanke for this hate speech.

Chavhanke claims to have contributed towards the ochlocratic atmosphere that led to police complaints and death threats against M. F. Husain for allegedly violating Hindu sentiments. As a result, Husain left India on a self-imposed exile until his death.

In April 2017, Chavhanke was booked and later arrested for inciting communal hatred between the Hindus and Muslimsts of Uttar Pradesh had registerecomplaint against Bindas Bol, hosted by Chavhanke and had alleged that it aired programmes that promoted communal disharmony and hostility between religious groups. Subsequently, Chavhanke was booked under various IPC sections and section 16 of the Cable Television Network (Regulation) Act, 1955 was also invoked. After being released on bail, he claimed that it was an attempt to "suppress and intimidate media".

In June 2018, the Delhi Minorities Commission issued a notice to the channel after it broadcast a program that claimed a Muslim-dominated region was inhabited by illegal Bangladeshi and Rohingya infiltrators.

On September 2020, Bindas Bol hosted by Chavhanke aired a conspiracy theory suggesting that Muslim students were "infiltrating" administrative services terming it "UPSC jihad"; became viral. It was heavily condemned, including by former senior bureaucrats, judges, and the Home Minister. Broadcast of the actual TV programme was stayed by the Delhi High Court and the matter is sub-judice.

The show claimed that Muslims were systematically "infiltrating" India's civil services, suggesting that Muslim candidates received undue advantages in the Union Public Service Commission (UPSC) examinations. These assertions were based on misleading data and unverified claims, including allegations of preferential treatment and undue benefits for Muslim aspirants.

The program faced widespread condemnation for promoting communal disharmony and spreading misinformation. Critics highlighted that the content was offensive and had the potential to promote communal attitudes. In response, the Ministry of Information and Broadcasting issued a caution to Sudarshan News, advising the channel to be more careful in the future and warning of stricter penal action in case of further violations. 91 retired Civil servants filed case against him claiming that his programme contains derogatory statements about the Muslim community and was divisive in nature, and the programme was paused by Allahabad High Court on 1 September 2020.

The Supreme Court of India also intervened, expressing concerns over the show's content and temporarily restraining the channel from airing further episodes. The court described the program as "insidious" and emphasized the need to balance freedom of the press with the responsibility to prevent communal discord.

=== Fake news ===
On multiple occasions, Sudarshan News was found to be spreading fake news. In 2019, the channel broadcast an old video, which was morphed with slogans calling for the killings of RSS workers. In 2014, fake quotes were attributed to Shahrukh Khan by the news channel. During the Delhi riots of 2020, the channel was found to be spreading communally charged fake news.

In March 2019, a Kozhikode district court ordered the channel to pay a compensation of ₹50 lakh (US$52,000) to Malabar Gold in a defamation suit, after it broadcast edited visuals alleging the company of having celebrated Pakistani Independence Day.
