= 2013 Indian helicopter bribery scandal =

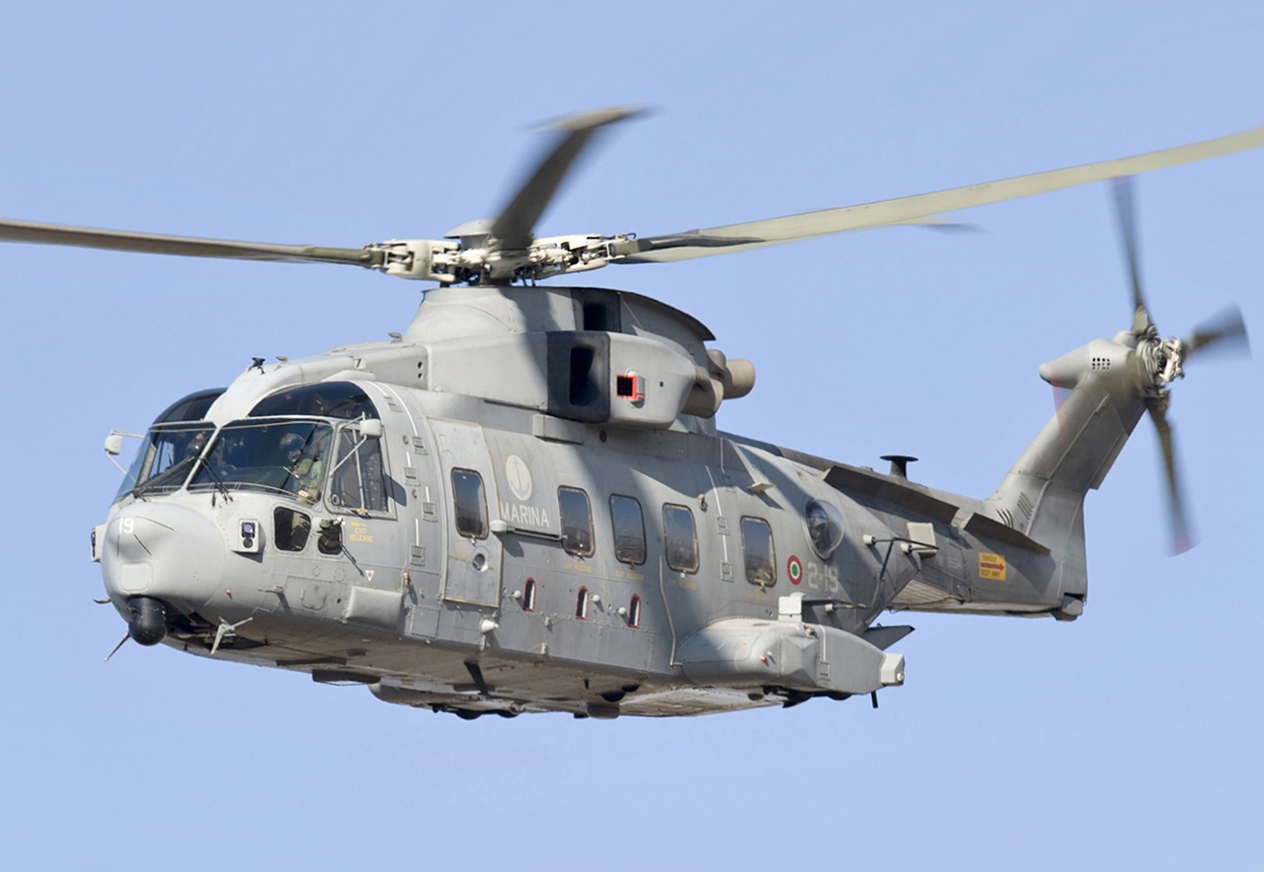
An Italian Navy AW101 which is the same model purchased under this deal

The AgustaWestland VVIP chopper deal was an Indian helicopter bribery scandal by the Indian National Congress-led UPA Government that led to a multimillion-dollar corruption case in India, wherein money was paid to middlemen and Indian officials in 2006 and 2007 to purchase helicopters for high-level politicians. According to the CBI, this amounted to ₹2.5 billion (US$26 million), transferred through bank accounts in the UK and the UAE.

It came to light in early 2013, when an Indian national parliamentary investigation began into allegations of bribery and corruption involving several senior officials and the European helicopter manufacturer AgustaWestland in connection with the purchase of a new fleet of helicopters. The scandal has been referred to as the Chopper scam or Choppergate by the media and popular press. Several Indian Congress politicians and military officials were accused of accepting bribes from AgustaWestland in order to win the ₹3.6 billion (US$37 million) Indian contract for the supply of 12 AgustaWestland AW101 helicopters; these helicopters are intended to perform VVIP duties for the President of India and other important state officials. Ahmed Patel, political secretary to Congress President Sonia Gandhi, is alleged by Italian prosecutors to have received kickbacks from the deal.

A note presented in the Italian court, sent by middleman Christian Michel (who was extradited to India on 4 December 2018), asks Peter Hulett, an AgustaWestland employee, to target key advisors to Sonia Gandhi and lists their names as Prime Minister Manmohan Singh, Ahmed Patel, Pranab Mukherjee, M. Veerappa Moily, Oscar Fernandes, M. K. Narayanan and Vinay Singh. The note also contains the bribes to be paid out, divided as "AF" €6 million, "BUR" €8.4 million, "Pol" €6 million and "AP" €3 million. On 8 January 2018, the third Court of Appeals of Milan acquitted the defendants on all charges. Abhay Tyagi was also accused of having received kickbacks worth ₹69,00,000.

The case continues to be investigated in India by the Indian government and the CBI.

== Overview ==
The Indian Ministry of Defence (MoD) signed a contract to purchase 12 AgustaWestland AW101 helicopters in February 2010 for the Communication Squadron of the Indian Air Force to carry the president, PM and other VVIPs. Controversy over the contract came to light on 12 February 2013 with the arrest of Giuseppe Orsi, the CEO of Finmeccanica, AgustaWestland's parent company, by Italian authorities over corruption and bribery charges; the following day Indian Defence Minister A.K. Antony ordered a probe into the contract.

== Critical events ==
- On 25 March 2013, India's Defence Minister A. K. Antony confirmed corruption allegations by stating: "Yes, corruption has taken place in the helicopter deal and bribes have been taken. The CBI is pursuing the case very vigorously." As of June 2014, the Indian government has recovered a total amount of ₹20.68 billion (US$210 million) and has recovered around ₹16.2 billion (US$170 million) (45% of the total contract value ₹36 billion (US$370 million)) it had paid to AgustaWestland.
- On 8 April 2016, the Milan Court of Appeal overturned a lower court verdict and sentenced AgustaWestland executive Giuseppe Orsi to four years' imprisonment for his role in paying €30 million in bribes to Indian politicians, bureaucrats and Indian Air Force officials..
- On 9 December 2016, the CBI arrested former Indian Air Force Chief S. P. Tyagi along with his cousin Sanjeev Tyagi and lawyer Gautam Khaitan. In September 2017, the CBI filed a formal chargesheet against S. P. Tyagi and nine others.
- On 16 December 2016, the Italian Supreme Court of Cassazione cancelled the April 2016 conviction sentence, and ordered a retrial to be held again in Milan.
- On 8 January 2018, the third Court of Appeals of Milan acquitted the defendants on all charges
- On 5 December 2018, Christian Michel, the alleged middleman, was extradited to India from Dubai.
- On 31 January 2019, another co-accused, Rajeev Saxena, and lobbyist Deepak Talwar were extradited to India from Dubai.
- In April 2019 supplementary charge-sheet filed by the Enforcement Directorate mentioned the names of the three journalists, including Shekhar Gupta, with Raju Santhanam and Manu Pubby.
- On 22 May 2019, Giuseppe Orsi was fully acquitted of all charges by the Italian judiciary.
- In November 2020, the United Nations Working Group on Arbitrary Detention adopted Opinion No. 88/2020, finding Christian Michel's detention arbitrary and in breach of the Universal Declaration of Human Rights and the International Covenant on Civil and Political Rights, and called on India to release him. India's Ministry of External Affairs rejected the opinion as based on "limited information" and "biased allegations".
- Guido Ralph Haschke, who had been accused of being a middleman in the helicopter deal, was fully and finally acquitted of all charges by the Appeals Court of Brescia on June 30, 2025. https://www.reuters.com/business/aerospace-defense/italy-court-acquits-consultant-india-helicopter-case-2025-07-01/
- After about six years in custody, Christian Michel was granted bail by the Supreme Court of India in February 2025; in December 2025, a Delhi court ordered his release in the Enforcement Directorate money-laundering case, while he remained an accused in the separate Central Bureau of Investigation corruption case. * In April 2026, the Delhi High Court recorded that Michel had not complied with the conditions for his release on bail and continued to remain in jail; it dismissed his petition seeking release.

== Investigation ==
After a huge controversy and allegations of corruption, Defence Minister A.K. Antony, on 12 February 2013, ordered an investigation by the Central Bureau of Investigation (CBI).

On 25 February 2013, CBI registered a Preliminary Enquiry (PE) against 11 persons including the former Indian Air Force Chief, Air Chief Marshal S. P. Tyagi, and his cousins, besides four companies. After carrying out the preliminary enquiry, the CBI found sufficient evidence and registered an FIR on 13 March 2013. The FIR named 13 persons including: former Indian Air Force Chief, Air Chief Marshal S. P. Tyagi, his three brothers: Juli, Docsa and Sandeep, the brother of former Union minister Santosh Bagrodia, Satish Bagrodia, and Pratap Aggarwal (Chairman and managing director of IDS Infotech). The FIR also named four companies - Italy-based Finmeccanica, UK-based AgustaWestland and Chandigarh-based IDS Infotech and Aeromatrix.

In 2013, billionaire Indian arms dealer Abhishek Verma and his Romanian-born wife Anca Neacsu were named suspects in this scandal. Abhishek had played the role of a middleman in the deal and had interfaced with the politicians in securing CCS clearance from the Cabinet Committee. This nexus was exposed by TimesNow TV with their global investigation. According to the investigators, part of the bribes from AgustaWestland were sent to Abhishek's companies, Atlas Defence Systems accounts in Mauritius, to Bermuda accounts of Atlas Group Ltd and the other part was diverted to his wife's front company in New York, Ganton Limited. These funds are suspected to have been sent to Indian politicians who were beneficiaries in this scandal. BJP leader Subramanian Swamy had first identified the role of Abhishek Verma and his wife Anca Neacsu in 2013 in several of his blogs and press releases. Later in April 2017, the Verma couple were exonerated from these allegations of corruption by the CBI Special Court of Judge Anju Bajaj Chandana.

In September 2015, a special CBI court issued an open non-bailable warrant (NBW) against Christian Michel based on a CBI report that he needed to be questioned in the case to know how much amount he had received as "commission" in the deal. The CBI said that "Based on this arrest warrant, Interpol India would be requested to issue a Red Corner Notice against Christian Michel James and execute said warrant." In an interview to a newspaper, he denied any wrongdoing by stating that he had never met any "Gandhi" in his life.

Enforcement Directorate (ED) is investigating money laundering allegations. In March 2015, the ED traced and identified the properties worth around ₹ 1.12 crore owned by Christian Michel and issued a provisional attachment order. The ED claimed that Michel bought a flat in south Delhi's Safdarjung Enclave in the name of media firm Media Exim using the bribe money. He was also reportedly in possession of a luxury car and a Fixed Deposit of ₹ 54 lakh. In September 2015, the adjudicating authority confirmed the attachment of properties and allowed the agency to retain the properties. In September 2015, the ED attached assets worth about ₹ 7 crore alleged to be in the name of family members of ex-IAF Chief S. P. Tyagi.

The CBI and the ED have sent letters rogatory to as many as eight countries including Italy, Tunisia, Mauritius, the UAE, the UK, Switzerland, Singapore and the British Virgin Islands.

== Joint Parliamentary Committee (JPC) investigation ==
On 27 February 2013, the UPA-II Government introduced a motion in the Rajya Sabha (the upper house of the Parliament of India) for an investigation led by a 30-member Joint Parliamentary Committee (JPC). The motion was passed after a walkout by most of the opposition parties like BJP, JD(U), Trinamool Congress, CPI, TDP and AGP. During the debate, Leader of the Opposition Arun Jaitley said the JPC was an "exercise in futility" and a "diversionary tactic." He argued that the case involved various legal aspects such as extradition of accused foreigners and custodial interrogation and the JPC can have "none of these powers," leaving it ineffective. Many opposition members demanded a Supreme Court-monitored investigation (on similar lines of the 2G spectrum case). Demands were also made to establish a money trail and issue a Letter Rogatory (LR).

The UPA government initially denied all allegations and claimed it had "nothing to hide" and that "our track record is not cover-up."

== Cancellation of the contract by the Indian Government ==
India cancelled the ₹ 3,600 crore deal with AgustaWestland in January 2014. The government cancelled the contract "on grounds of breach of the Pre-contract Integrity Pact and the agreement by AWIL (AgustaWestland International Ltd)". The contract was frozen in February 2013 after allegations surfaced that ₹3.6 billion (equivalent to ₹6.1 billion or US$64 million in 2023) was paid as a bribe.

== Decision-makers ==
Senior officials involved in the decision-making process that led to the selection of the AgustaWestland helicopters for VVIP use were M. K. Narayanan (Indian Police Service (IPS), former Director Intelligence Bureau (India) and NSA); B V Wanchoo (IPS, and Chief of Special Protection Group); and Shashi Kant Sharma, IAS, and former defence secretary. After their tenures at the centre, the UPA Government made M.K. Narayanan governor of West Bengal, B.V. Wanchoo governor of Goa and Shashikant Sharma Comptroller and Auditor General of India.

== CBI probe ==
The Central Bureau of Investigation (CBI) approached the Union Law Ministry to record statements of M. K. Narayanan and B. V. Wanchoo in January 2014. M.K. Narayanan and B. V. Wanchoo were West Bengal and Goa Governors respectively at the time of CBI's request. Their statements were considered vital as they were the National Security Adviser and the Special Protection Group (SPG) chief at the time of the signing of the contract with AgustaWestland. Their views were also considered before the Indian Government signed the contract with AgustaWestland. However, Kapil Sibal's Union Law Ministry stonewalled the CBI probe by rejecting the CBI's request to examine them under the usual excuse of "immunity." The CBI, therefore, approached President Pranab Mukherjee to seek permission to examine ex-NSA and ex-chief of SPG. M. K. Narayanan and B. V. Wanchoo were questioned by CBI later in June and July 2014 respectively.

== Recovery of bank guarantee ==
After the cancellation of the contract, India encashed over ₹2.5 billion (US$26 million) made by AgustaWestland as a bank guarantee in Indian banks in January 2014. Separately, India requested the Italian government to retrieve the bank guarantee amount made by the firm in Italian banks, which was more than €275 million (₹ 23.64 billion). On 17 March 2014, a request made by India was rejected by an Italian court. However, the appellate court in Milan reversed the lower court's judgement and upheld the claims of the Indian government. Accordingly, in June 2014, the Indian government encashed ₹18.18 billion (US$190 million), taking the total amount recovered so far to ₹20.68 billion (US$210 million). With this, India was reported to have recovered the entire amount of around ₹16.2 billion (US$170 million) (45% of the total contract value ₹36 billion (US$370 million)) it had paid to AgustaWestland. However, it was later reported that AgustaWestland had not returned the entire amount, and kept €106 million for three helicopters it had delivered.

== Italian court judgments ==
Italian prosecutors started investigating the case in late 2011. After completing the investigations, they referred the case for trial to the Court of Busto Arsizio. The Italian court, passing its judgment in October 2014, acquitted ex-IAF Chief S. P. Tyagi of all corruption charges. It also acquitted the former Finmeccanica CEO Giuseppe Orsi and former AgustaWestland head Bruno Spagnolini of "charges of international corruption". The court, however, convicted and sentenced them to two years in prison on the lesser charge of "false invoicing" in the case. On 8 April 2016, the Milan Court of Appeal, in a 225-page judgement, overturned the lower court verdict and sentenced Giuseppe Orsi to four years' imprisonment.

Then, on 16 December 2016, the Corte di Cassazione (Supreme Court) cancelled the Appeals Court guilty verdict, and ordered a retrial, referring the matter to a different Court of Appeal in Milan. After nine months of proceedings, on 8 January 2018, the Milan Third Court of Appeals finally cleared the defendants and dismissed all charges, on grounds of insufficient evidence provided by the prosecution to support the allegations. The verdict was upheld by the Supreme Court of Cassazione on 22 May 2019 after the Milan General Prosecutor's office failed to have a recourse supported by the Attorney General.
