= Rheinmetall =

German military vehicle and arms manufacturer

Rheinmetall AG

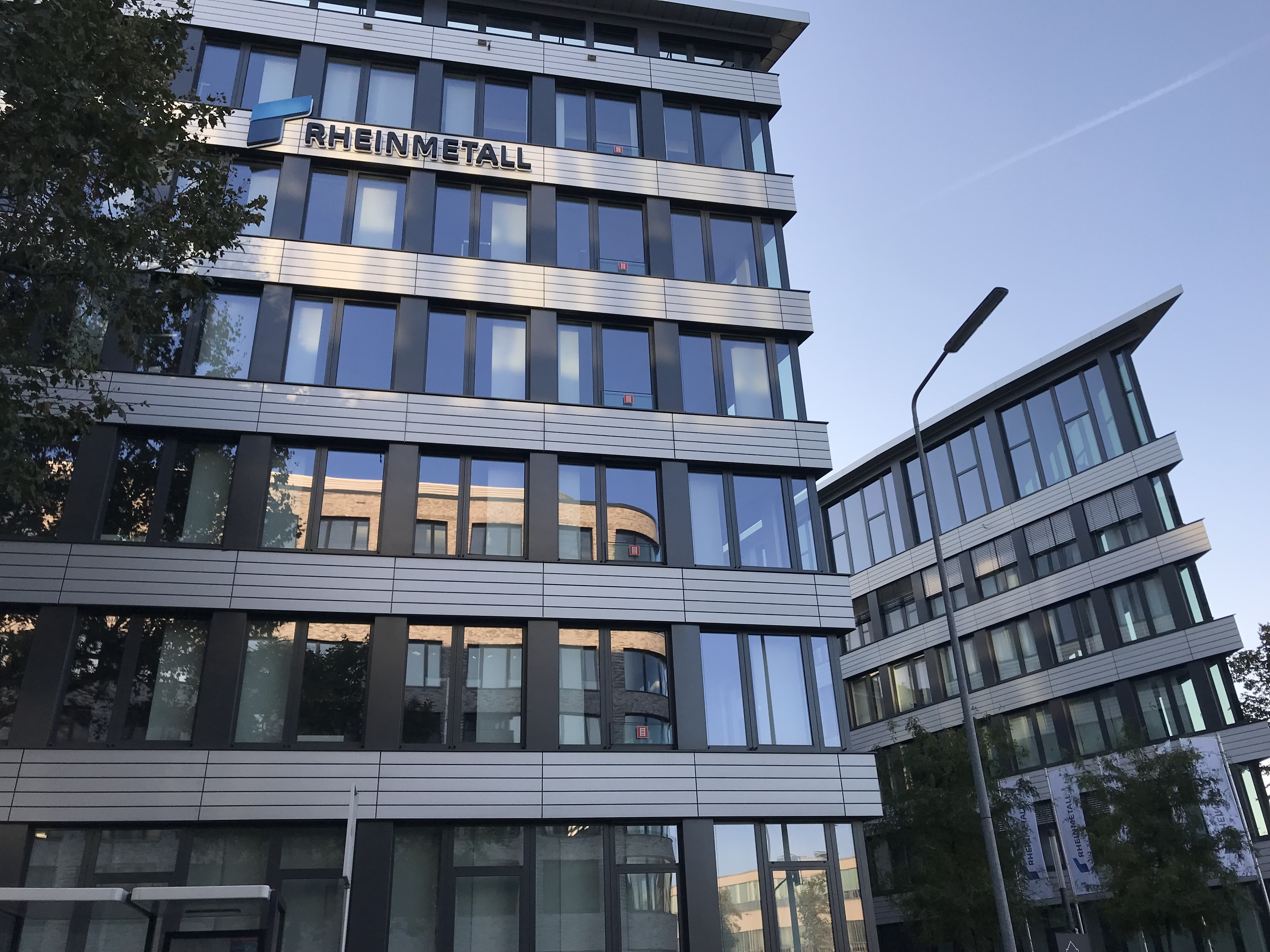
- Rheinmetall's head office in Düsseldorf
- Type: Public (Aktiengesellschaft)
- Traded as: FWB: RHM; FWB: RHMB (ADR); OTCID Basic Current: RNMBF; OTCID Basic Current: RNMBY (ADR); DAX component (RHM)
- ISIN: DE0007030009; US76206K1079
- Industry: Defence
- Founded: 13 April 1889; 137 years ago
- Founder: Lorenz Zuckermandel
- Headquarters: Düsseldorf, Germany
- Key people: Armin Papperger (CEO and chairman of the executive board); Ulrich Grillo (Chairman of the supervisory board)
- Products: Automotive parts; military vehicles; autocannons; ATGMs; anti-aircraft defence systems; artillery; mortars; tank guns; munitions; ammunition; fuze systems; electronics; naval ships
- Revenue: ▲€9.935 billion (2025)
- Operating income: ▲€1.841 billion (2025)
- Net income: ▲€835 million (2025)
- Total assets: ▲€16.772 billion (end 2025)
- Total equity: ▲€5.615 billion (end 2025)
- Number of employees: ▲40,000 (2025)
- Subsidiaries: Rheinmetall BAE Systems Land (55%); Rheinmetall MAN Military Vehicles (51%); Blohm+Voss; RWM Italia S.p.A (100%)
- Website: www.rheinmetall.com/en

Rheinmetall AG (Note: AG stands for Aktiengesellschaft, which means "joint-stock company".) (German pronunciation: [ˈʁaɪnmeˌtal]) is a German arms manufacturer, headquartered in Düsseldorf, North Rhine-Westphalia, Germany. The group was promoted to the DAX, Germany's leading stock market index, in March 2023. It is the largest German and fifth-largest European arms manufacturer, and produces a variety of armored fighting vehicles and armored personnel carriers, in both wheeled and tracked versions. Furthermore, the company is one of the largest munitions manufacturers within NATO; it produces air defence systems and, since 2026, has also been building warships, including at the traditional Blohm+Voss shipyard. The company also manufactures loitering munitions. Through partnerships and joint ventures, it furthermore produces reconnaissance radar satellites and centre fuselage sections for the F-35 fighter jet. Its name is derived from the German-language words Rhein and Metall, translating to "Rhine-metal" when combined.

== History ==
=== Founding and early growth ===
In April 1889, Hörder Bergwerks-und Hütten-Verein, a metalworks and mining conglomerate, founded the Rheinische Metallwaren–und Maschinenfabrik Aktiengesellschaft (Note: "Rhenish Metal Goods and Machinery Factory Corporation") to produce ammunition for the armed forces of the German Empire. The first Rheinmetall factory was established by engineer Heinrich Ehrhardt (1840–1928) in Düsseldorf. Rheinmetall continued to expand production the late 19th century and also acquired the companies Metallwerk Ehrhardt & Heye AG in 1892 (incorporating them into the company in 1896). In 1896, Rheinmetall presented the world's first rapid-fire gun suitable for field service, with variable recoil and combined barrel recoil and a forward feed device. It was based on patents by the engineer Konrad Haußner. The Prussian artillery testing commission rejected it, either misjudging or not realising the possibilities. After the successful introduction of recoil-operated guns by France (Canon de 75 mle 1897), this attitude changed and the development became a great economic success for Rheinmetall. In 1901, on the initiative of Heinrich Ehrhardt, Rheinmetall took over the bankrupt Munitions- und Waffenfabrik AG in Sömmerda, expanding its product range.

=== World War I and the interwar period ===
In the following years, Rheinmetall also grew due to orders from abroad. In 1906, the factory in Düsseldorf was expanded. At the beginning of the First World War in 1914, Rheinmetall was one of the largest armaments manufacturers in the German Empire, and employed almost 8,000 people. By the end of the war, the workforce had increased to almost 48,000 workers and employees, including around 9,000 women. The built-up area at the main plant quadrupled during this time.

After the war, the armaments production came to a standstill and Rheinmetall had to lay off employees. The provisions of the Treaty of Versailles made it necessary to switch to civilian products. Rheinmetall therefore produced locomotives, railway carriages, agricultural machinery and steam ploughs in the Rhineland. The factory in Sömmerda produced precision mechanical devices such as typewriters and calculating machines. Steel production in Rath was increased to ensure the production of civilian goods.

From 1921, Allied regulations once again permitted the production of weapons systems in small quantities. The plant in Düsseldorf-Derendorf was occupied by Belgian and French troops in 1921, during the Allied occupation of the Rhineland, and from 1923 to 1925 during the occupation of the Ruhr, and was partially devastated. Due to a lack of orders, civilian production had to be discontinued except for the manufacture of steam ploughs. In 1925, the state holding company VIAG of the German Reich bought a majority stake in Rheinmetall, as part of a capital increase.

In April 1933, Rheinmetall bought the locomotive manufacturer Borsig, which was about to be liquidated, and thus came into possession of a large factory in Berlin-Tegel. This led to Rheinmetall being renamed Rheinmetall-Borsig AG in 1936. As part of the rearmament of the Wehrmacht, Rheinmetall increasingly developed and produced weapons and ammunition on behalf of the Reich Ministry of War from the mid-1930s onward. The products ranged from machine guns and cannons, anti-tank guns, mine launchers and field guns to anti-aircraft guns and railway guns. In 1937, the subsidiary Alkett (Altmärkische Kettenwerke) was founded in Berlin for the development and construction of armoured tracked vehicles. From 1937 onward, it was the second largest German armaments company. In 1938, the company moved its headquarters from Düsseldorf to Berlin.

=== World War II ===
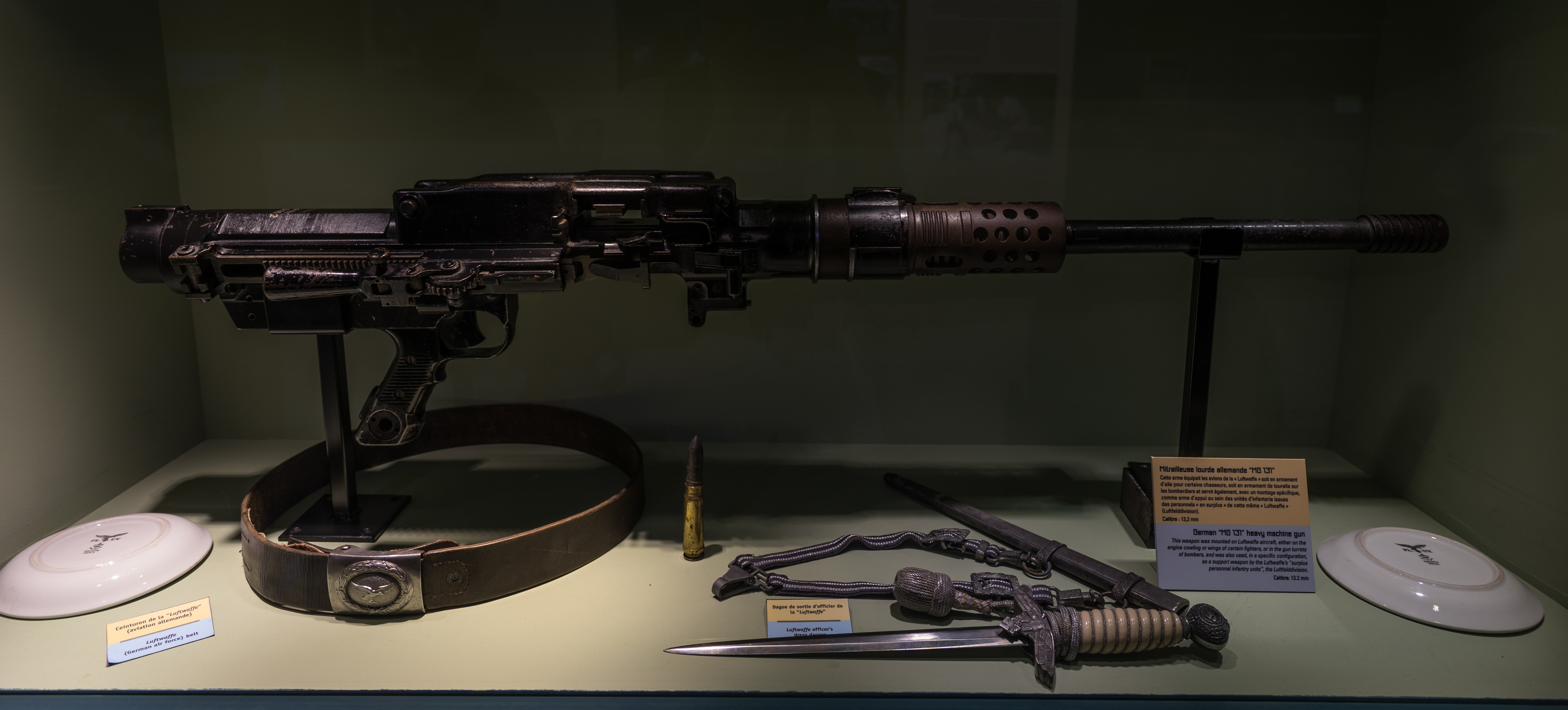
Rheinmetall-Borsig MG 131

During the Second World War, armaments production was increased to the maximum and the development of new weapons systems was demanded. State influence through Wehrmacht institutions and the integration of Rheinmetall-Borsig into the state-owned company Reichswerke Hermann Göring increased to such an extent that the company came under complete state control and was integrated into the planned war preparations. The company manufactured weapons for the German armed forces that included large quantities of the AA 3.7 cm Flak 43 gun and to a lesser extent, the 5 cm Flak 41. Other weapons produced included machine guns such as the MG 131 machine gun.

In the last two years of the war, the production facilities were severely damaged or destroyed by Allied air raids. After a heavy air raid on the factories in Düsseldorf, numerous production areas were relocated east to areas of the later GDR, such as Apolda and present-day Poland, such as Guben and Breslau. During the war, the number of employees grew to 85,000. By the end of the war, most of the Rheinmetall-Borsig plants had been destroyed. The plants in Düsseldorf, West Berlin and Unterlüß came under the control of the Western Allies, and under trusteeship. All properties in the territories occupied by the Red Army were expropriated. Some factories were completely dismantled by the victorious powers.

During the Second World War, numerous forced labourers worked in the Rheinmetall factories. In the Unterlüß plant alone, around 5,000 foreign forced labourers and prisoners of war, approximately 2,500 Poles, 1,000 from the USSR, 500 Yugoslavs, 1,000 from other countries, were liberated by British troops at the end of the war. Between 1944 and 1945, Rheinmetall-Borsig took over the sponsorship of the nursery for foreign children in Unterlüß, which was also a maternity home for forced labourers and a killing centre for their children. At times, Hungarian Jewish women from a subcamp of the Bergen-Belsen concentration camp were deployed in Unterlüß.

=== Cold War ===
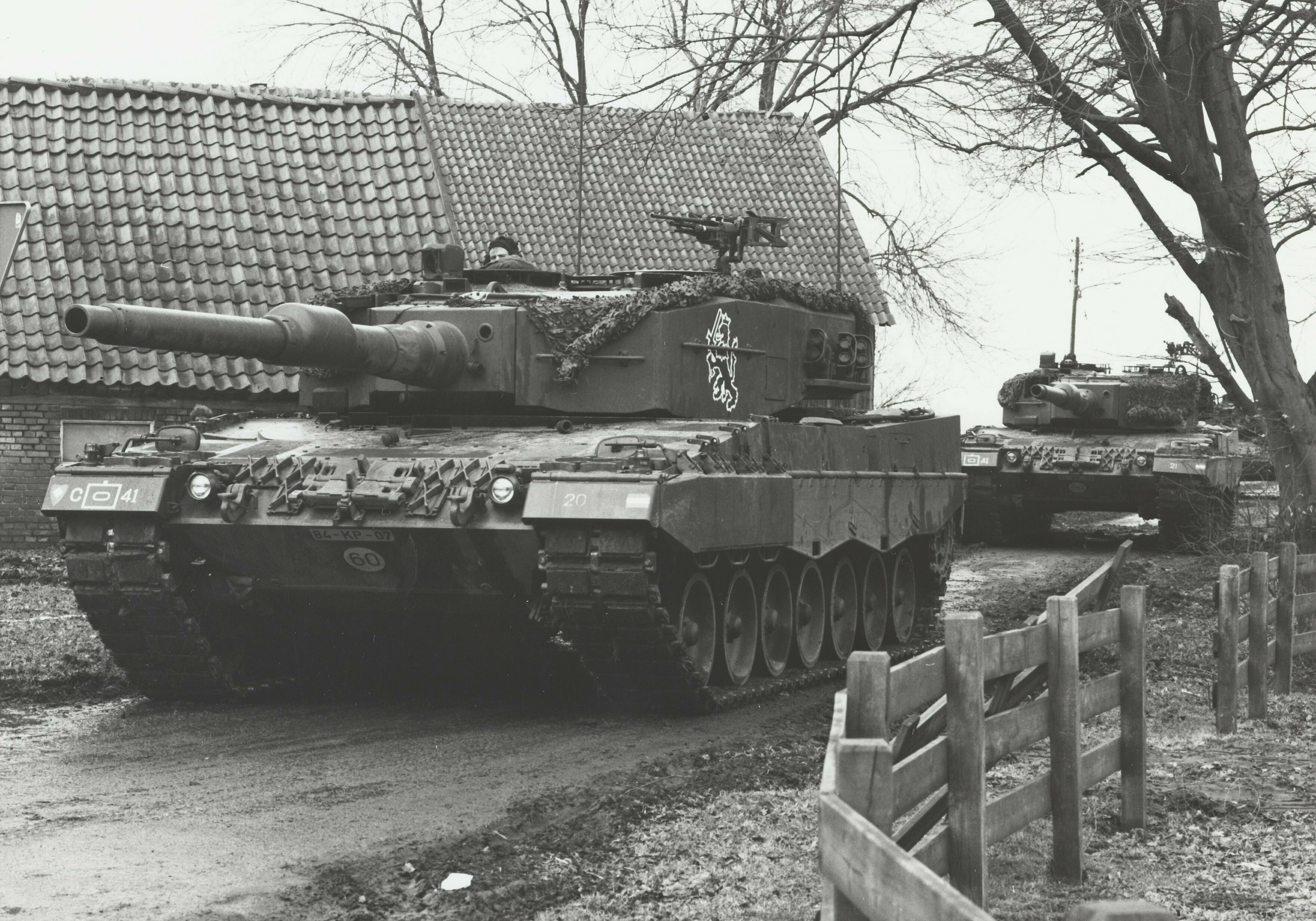
Leopard 2 main battle tank seen in the 1980s. The tank utilises the Rheinmetall Rh-120 tank gun.

The Düsseldorf plant was not fully destroyed after the Second World War. While production ceased, a small number of employees and workers apparently remained in service, carrying out clean-up work and small-scale civilian production. The Rheinmetall sites were not severely affected by dismantling following their capture by the Western Allies and the Soviet forces.

In the East Germany, state-owned spinoffs of Rheinmetall manufactured office machines (including typewriters, automotive parts and moped engines, cameras, and later printers and personal computers. Much of the production took place at Sömmerda.

In West Germany, production was completely banned until 1950. Rheinmetall-Borsig was then transformed into a pure holding company owned by the Federal Republic of Germany. Two independent subsidiaries were founded. Borsig in Berlin produced steam boilers and refrigeration systems. Rheinmetall in Düsseldorf built typewriters, shock absorbers, lifts, tanning machines and transport and loading equipment. In 1956, the 56 per cent majority share in Rheinmetall-Borsig, which was owned by the Federal Republic of Germany, was taken over by Röchlingsche Eisen- und Stahlwerke GmbH. In August, Borsig was sold to Salzgitter AG. The holding company was renamed Rheinmetall Berlin AG in November. A new defence technology production programme was launched in 1956, with the establishment of the Bundeswehr, including restarting production of machine guns, automatic cannons and ammunition. The first product was the MG3.

In 1964, production of heavy weapons resumed, such as gun barrels and mounts. Rheinmetall began equipping tanks and artillery pieces. Rheinmetall developed a tank destroyer cannon, a standard armoured turret and a tank howitzer. In 1965, the development of 120-millimetre smoothbore technology began under the leadership of Raimund Germershausen. Parallel to the increasing sales success and organic growth, Rheinmetall acquired around a dozen smaller mechanical engineering companies between 1958 and 1973, primarily those active in the fields of packaging and forming technology and electronics. 1974/75 saw the first acquisitions of foreign companies in Portugal, Great Britain and the Netherlands. In 1978, production of the 155 mm FH70 field howitzer began. In October 1979, the first Leopard 2 main battle tank (equipped with the 120-millimetre smoothbore gun developed by Rheinmetall) was delivered to the Bundeswehr.

In the following years, the company's civilian division was reorganised and strengthened in 1981 with the purchasing of multiple companies, although the company was unsuccessful in acquiring the WMF Group. In 1999, Rheinmetall sold off its packaging technology division to IWKA AG. In 1986, the Automotive Technology division was established through the acquisition of carburettor manufacturer Pierburg GmbH. Together with Diehl Munitionssysteme, Rheinmetall founded the Gesellschaft für Intelligente Wirksysteme (GIWS). GIWS specialised in intelligent ammunition, projectiles and other defence technology systems. In 1989, due to the changed global political situation at the end of the Cold War, Rheinmetall diversified into civilian industrial products.

=== 1990s ===
By acquiring a 100 per cent stake in MaK System Gesellschaft, part of Friedrich Krupp AG, between 1990 and 1992, Rheinmetall expanded its expertise in the field of new systems for land forces and special vehicles. For example, for use in environmental protection. In the same year, Rheinmetall delivered the first Wiesel armoured weapon carrier to the German armed forces. The company strengthened its involvement in the field of ammunition production by acquiring a stake in WNC-Nitrochemie GmbH in Aschau am Inn.

In 1993, Rheinmetall expanded its civilian product range by acquiring Mauser Waldeck AG to build up the Office Systems division, taking over Heimann Systems GmbH to strengthen the Security Technology division and acquiring a majority stake in Preh-Werke to expand the Automotive Technology division. In 1995, Rheinmetall expanded its expertise in medium-calibre automatic cannon systems, by acquiring a majority stake in Mauser-Werke Oberndorf Waffensysteme GmbH and increasing Pierburg's involvement in the USA. In the same year, Rheinmetall acquired a stake in STN Atlas Elektronik in order to strengthen its expertise in defence electronics.

In 1997, Rheinmetall underwent a fundamental reorganisation, in the form of mergers and new acquisitions, including acquiring Hirschmann, an electronics communication company.

In 1998, the first unit of the new gun artillery system Panzerhaubitze 2000, developed by Rheinmetall and MaK Systemgesellschaft, was handed over to the Bundeswehr, and the Rhino minesweeper from MaK Systemgesellschaft was deployed in the former Yugoslavia. Rheinmetall took over the defence technology of BUCK System GmbH and formed BUCK Neue Technologien. In 1999, Rheinmetall acquired a majority stake in Oerlikon Contraves, a supplier of combined cannon and guided missile systems for air defence, and Eurometaal Holding N.V., a manufacturer of medium calibre artillery. In late 1999, Rheinmetall took over the companies KUKA Wehrtechnik and Henschel Wehrtechnik, and later combined the two with MaK Systemgesellschaft, to form the new company, Rheinmetall Landsysteme.

=== 2000 and onward ===
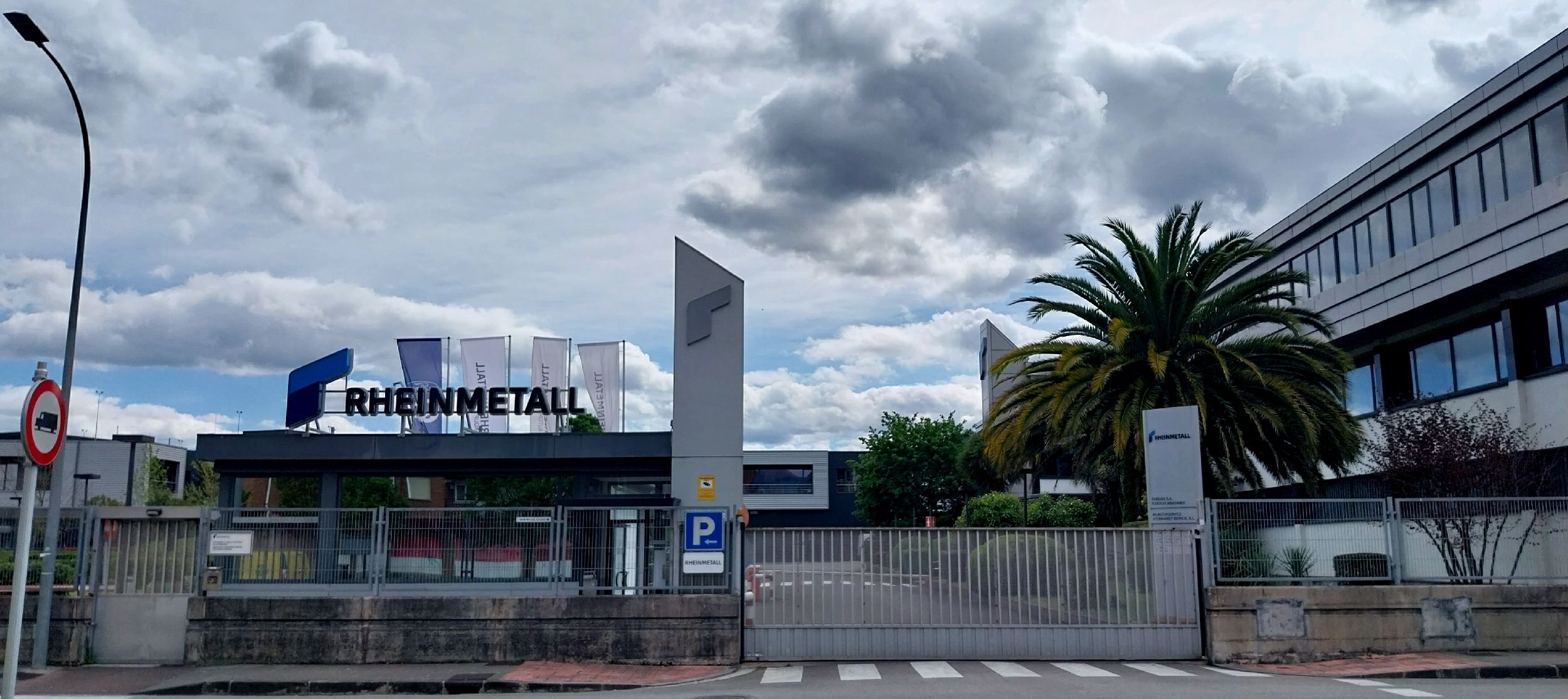
Rheinmetall production facility in Spain

In 2000, Rheinmetall's Executive Board decided to concentrate on defence technology, automotive technology and electronics. Subsequently, it sold off multiple subsidiaries. By 2004, the focus on the defence technology divisions was largely completed.

In 2003, Rheinmetall Landsysteme delivered the first new Marder 1A5 mine-protected infantry fighting vehicle. To develop the new Puma infantry fighting vehicle for the Bundeswehr, Rheinmetall Landsysteme and Krauss-Maffei Wegmann set up the joint venture PSM GmbH, in which both companies hold a 50 per cent stake. In the Defence Technology division, Rheinmetall W&M GmbH was merged with Mauser-Werke Oberndorf Waffensysteme GmbH, Buck Neue Technologien GmbH and Pyrotechnik Silberhütte GmbH to form the new Rheinmetall Waffe Munition GmbH. Rheinmetall cooperated with Rafael Ltd. and Diehl Munitionssysteme GmbH for missile manufacturing contracts.

In 2005, Rheinmetall Landsysteme became a co-partner in the newly founded Heeresinstandsetzungslogistik (HIL). The company is responsible for the maintenance of selected vehicles and weapon systems of the German Army.

In 2008, Rheinmetall acquired the armour manufacturer Stork PWV from the Dutch conglomerate Stork, taking over a share of the production of Boxer armored vehicles, which were developed for the Bundeswehr and the Dutch army.

In May 2010, Rheinmetall and MAN founded the joint company Rheinmetall MAN Military Vehicles (RMMV). This created a full-range supplier in the market for wheeled military vehicles, covering the complete range of protected and unprotected transport, command and functional vehicles for international armed forces. Rheinmetall holds a 51 per cent stake in the company and MAN 49 per cent. Between 2010 and 2011, Rheinmetall acquired the German activities of Verseidag Ballistic Protection. In February 2011, Rheinmetall increased its stake in ADS Gesellschaft für aktive Schutzsysteme.

In 2012, KSPG took over the plain bearing manufacturing activities of Kirloskar Oil Engines Ltd (KOEL) in Pune, India.

In January 2012, Rheinmetall and Cassidian combined their activities in the field of unmanned aerial systems and cargo loading systems in a joint venture. Cassidian holds 51 percent and Rheinmetall 49 percent of the shares in the newly founded Rheinmetall Airborne Systems GmbH. In May 2012, the automotive sector streamlined its organizational structure. KSPG's previous six business units were bundled into three divisions: Hardparts, Mechatronics and Motorservice.

In 2019 the Rheinmetall BAE Systems Land joint venture was formed to manufacture Boxer and Challenger 3 vehicles for the British Army.

=== Post 2022 ===
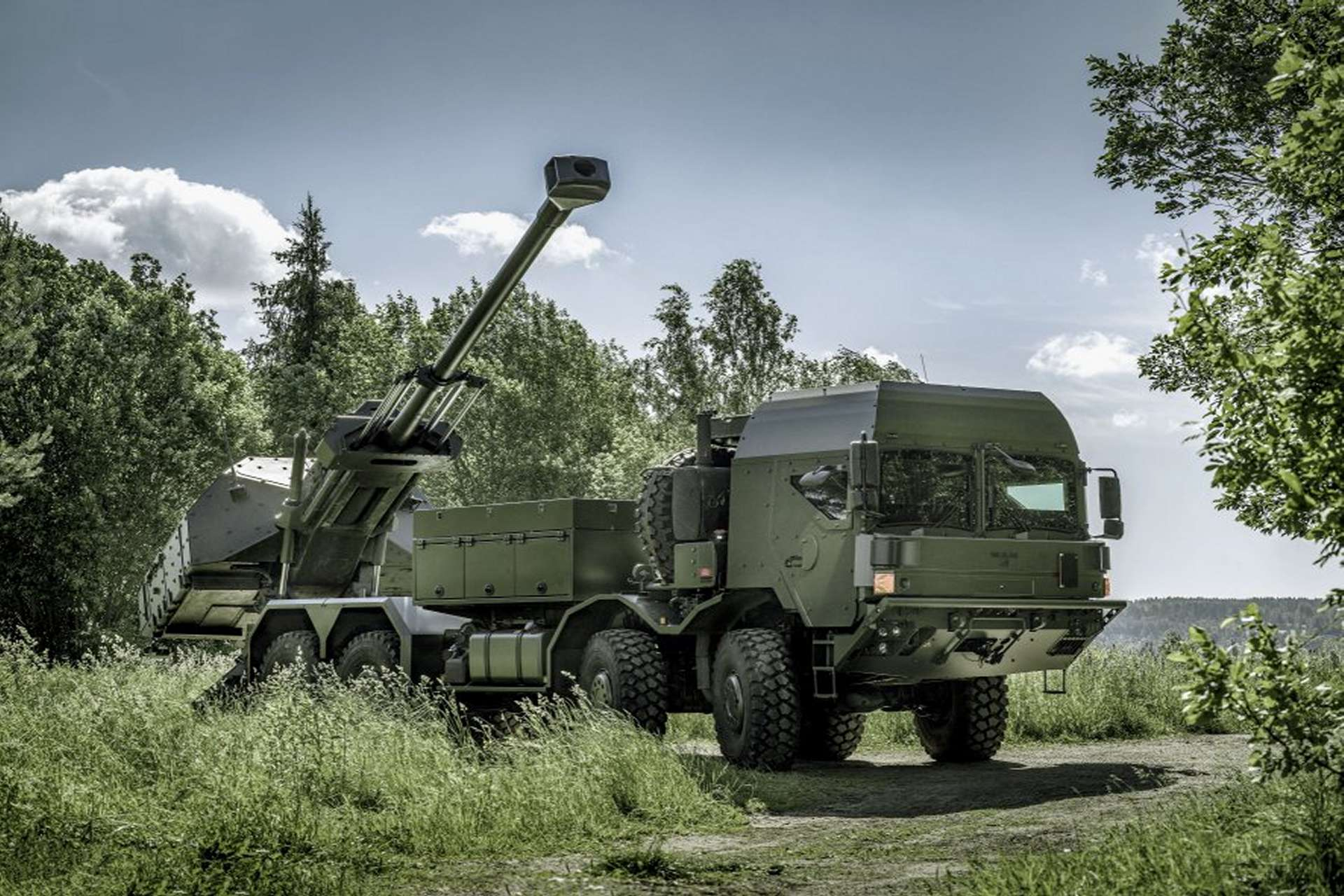
Rheinmetall HX 8x8 truck carrying an Archer gun system

Following the Russian invasion of Ukraine in 2022, German Chancellor Olaf Scholz gave the Zeitenwende speech during a special session of the Bundestag in February allocating a special fund for the Bundeswehr of 100 billion euros for increased defence spending. Rheinmetall Group CEO Armin Papperger expressed the expectation that Rheinmetall would benefit from this on a large scale by placed orders and an increased share price. In June 2022, Rheinmetall presented its latest Panther KF51 main battle tank at the Eurosatory arms fair.

In November 2022, Rheinmetall announced the purchase of Spanish ammunition manufacturer Expal, which was completed in August 2023 for 1.2 billion euros, although the process was subject to a competition investigation. As a result, Rheinmetall was fined 13 million euros in 2024 for providing misleading information regarding its merger with Expal Systems. In December 2022 and into early 2023, Rheinmetall increased production of ammunition in Germany, in connection with the war in Ukraine and a Swiss veto on ammunition deliveries. Rheinmetall announced that it was building a new production facility for 20-35 millimeter calibre ammunition. In July 2023, the plant started production. In September 2023, it was announced that Hungary would be the first country to complete development of its version of the KF 51 tank, and locally produce it. Also in 2023, Rheinmetall opened a service and logistics centre in Satu Mare, Romania for maintaining the weapons used by Ukraine. A year later, Rheinmetall confirmed that the facility was operating and that it was developed in cooperation with the Automecanica Mediaș company. The same year, Automecanica Mediaș was renamed to Rheinmetall Automecanica after the German company purchased its majority stake. In October 2023, Ukrainian Prime Minister Denys Shmyhal presented Chancellor Scholz with the certificate of registration of the joint venture Rheinmetall Ukrainian Defence Industry LLC, based in Kyiv, which began operations in the same month. Rheinmetall began producing the Lynx Infantry Fighting Vehicle in Ukraine in mid 2024, with the first units expected to be delivered by the end of the year. Production of the TPz Fuchs Armoured Personnel Carrier in Ukraine was also planned on a similar timescale, though it is unclear if this has also begun.

In 2023 and early 2024, an Indian public-owned company, Munitions India, exported 500 tonnes of explosives to Germany's Rheinmetall. An initial shipment of 144 tonnes of explosive was sent in October 2023. Two additional shipments were undertaken with the final shipment in March 2024. In 2024, it was reported 200,000 artillery shells were to be manufactured at a new plant in Unterlüß. In 2024, Rheinmetall signed a deal with Lithuania to build a 155 mm artillery ammunition plant. The company will invest around €180 million and the plant will be jointly owned by Rheinmetall and the Lithuanian government. The plant is being built in Baisogala and is expected to be operational in mid-2026. In September 2025 a similar 155 mm ammunition plant was announced to be built by Rheinmetall in Latvia. In July 2024, US intelligence services claimed to have foiled a Russian plot to assassinate Armin Papperger (CEO and chairman of the executive board).

In May 2025, the Indian Reliance Group agreed to provide Rheinmetall with explosives and ammunition. The deal included the supply of raw materials as well as the production of munitions at a facility in India. The businesses also announced a strategic partnership to work on several joint areas of business. Rheinmetall Waffe Munition GmbH placed an export order worth ₹600 crore (equivalent to ₹620 crore or US$66 million in 2026) from Reliance Defence. The contract is a part of the larger strategic partnership with the same company.

In September 2025, the company acquired the ship producer and shipyards of Blohm+Voss. They also agreed to establish joint production of 155 MM artillery in Ukraine.

In October 2025, the company formalized partnership with a US defense and critifcal materials company Solugen based out of Houston, Texas to expand the availability of new and affordable, U.S.-made energetics to support faster adoption of advanced energetics across the defense sector.

== Divisions ==
The company has diversified into multiple divisions across both land, air, maritime and electronics.

With its Vehicle Systems Division, Europe and International, Rheinmetall is primarily active in the field of wheeled and tracked military vehicles, both logistic and tactical as well as turret systems for mounting on other vehicles.

Logistics Vehicles		Vehicle Configuration					
Model	Axle Configuration & Chassis Payload	Cargo/Cargo with Crane	Hooklift	Tanker/Tipper	System Carrier	Recovery	Light & Heavy Equipment Tractor
HX2	20t 4x4 (8t)	X		X	X		
HX2	33t 6x6 (15t)	X		X	X	X	X
HX2	41t 8x8 (21t)	X	X	X	X	X	X
HX2	50t 10x10 (28t)				X	X	
HX3	20t 4x4 (8t)	X					
HX3	33t 6x6 (15t)	X	X	X	X	X	X
HX3	41t 8x8 (21t)	X	X	X	X	X	X
HX3	50t 10x10 (28t)		X	X	X	X	
HX (System Carrier)	HX Recovery	-	-	-	-	-	-
HX (System Carrier)	HX Bridge Layer	-	-	-	-	-	-
HX (System Carrier)	HX Excavator	-	-	-	-	-	-
HX (System Carrier)	HX ALHS	-	-	-	-	-	-
HX (System Carrier)		-	-	-	-	-	-
HX (System Carrier)		-	-	-	-	-	-
HX (System Carrier)	HX 10x10 Heavy Repair & Recovery	-	-	-	-	-	-
TG-MIL							
Armoured Cabins
Trailers
Tactical Vehicles - Tracked
Leopard MBT							
Panther KF51
Challenger 2 MBT
Lynx IFV
Puma IFV
Marder IFV
Warrior IFV
Wiesel
Bv206S
Buffel
Keiler
Kodiak
CRAAV - Armoured Engr Veh
CVR(T) - Recce Veh
Titan - Armoured Engr Veh
Trojan - Armoured Engr Veh
Terrier - Armoured Engr Veh
Bulldog - APC
Wheeled Armoured Vehicles
Boxer							
Fuchs Evolution
GMARS
Pinzgauer
HX Wheeled SP Howitzer
HX GMARS
Survivor R 4x4

The Weapon and Ammunition division is active in weapon systems and ammunition.

The Air Defence Division is grouped into two business units: Systems & Effectors and Systems & Sensors. It covers the following areas:

Air Defence Division Products
Area	Product
Networked Air Defence	Skynex
Drone Defence Toolbox	Mobile C-UAS
Command & Control Systems	Skymaster
Stationary Air Defence	Oerlikon Skyguard 3 Oerlikon Skyshield Oerlikon X-TAR3D Search Radar
Mobile Air Defence	Oerlikon Skyranger
Naval Air Defence	Oerlikon Millennium Gun Oerlikon Searanger Oerlikon Seaguard

The Digital Systems Division contains the following business units: Air Unmanned Space, Defence Electronics, Digital Solutions and Global Business. The Air Unmanned Space business unit develops solutions for use in space as well and manned and unmanned aircraft. This includes a strategic partnership with Lockheed Martin and Northrop Grumman to manufacture the centre fuselages for the F-35A Lightning II, as well as a joint venture with ICEYE to manufacture state-of-the-art earth observation satellites. Future collaborations include with Boeing Australia to integrate the MQ-28 Ghost Bat fighter-bomber drone into European command, control and weapons systems. This unit is also responsible for the development and manufacture of the FV-014 loitering munition system. The Defence Electronics unit's diverse portfolio contains a number of sensors, command and control software and effectors. This unit also contains a simulation and training systems across all military domains.

Naval Systems Division contains surface shipbuilding capabilities with four specialised shipyards in northern Germany: Blohm+Voss and Norderwerft in Hamburg, Peene-Werft in Wolgast and Neue Jadewerft in Wilhelmshaven. In addition to shipbuilding the division offers a maintence, repair and servicing portfolio. It contains four business units: Autonomous Maritime Technology, Service & Repair, Shipbuilding Germany and Shipbuilding International.

== Finances ==
Rheinmetall stock price (1973–2025)

In fiscal year 2022 (2021), Rheinmetall generated sales of €6.410 billion (€5.658 billion). It had 25,486 (23,945) employees (FTE) and a reported EBIT of €731 million (€608 million). In the 2020 financial year (2019) Rheinmetall had €5.405 billion (€6.255 billion) in sales, with 23,268 (23,780) employees (FTE) worldwide. In 2022, Rheinmetall was the largest defence company in Germany, and the fifth largest in Europe. Rheinmetall has been listed in the German DAX share index since 20 March 2023.

The key trends for Rheinmetall AG are, as of each financial year:

Year	2017	2018	2019	2020	2021	2022	2023	2024	2025
Total revenue (€ mn.)	5,896	6,148	6,255	5,875	5,658	6,410	7,176	9,751	9,935
Net profit (€ mn.)	224	305	335	−27	291	469	535	804	1,029
Total Assets (€ mn.)	6,358	6,759	7,415	7,267	7,734	8,089	11,943	14,670	17,077
Number of employees	21,610	22,899	23,780	23,268	23,945	25,486	28,054	28,539	32,251

== Ownership ==
In December 2024, 57% of Rheinmetall AG shares were held by institutional investors, 28% of which came from North America, 20% from Europe and 9% from the rest of the world. 27% of Rheinmetall's shares were owned by private shareholders while other investors held the remaining 16%. The largest shareholders in January 2026 are:

- BlackRock (7,07%)
- Bank of America (4,64%)
- Morgan Stanley (4,37%)
- Goldman Sachs (4,06%)
- UBS Group (3,83%)

== Criticism ==
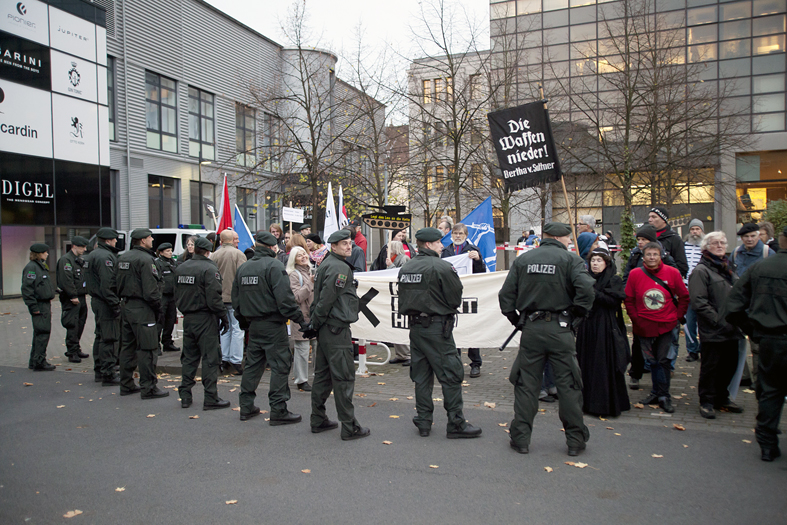
Protestors outside Rheinmetall in Düsseldorf

In 2012, Rheinmetall Air Defence (RAD), a division of Rheinmetall, was one of six companies that were blacklisted by India's Ministry of Defence for their involvement in a bribery scandal. The companies were accused of bribing the Director General of Ordnance Factories Board (OFB), Sudipta Ghosh. RAD and the other firms were barred from any dealings with the OFB and all other Indian defence companies, as well as being blacklisted from participating in any Indian defence contract, for a period of 10 years. RAD claimed that the charges against it are without merit. In 2012, Rheinmetall Air Defence was implicated in a corruption case in India, along with arms dealer Abhishek Verma and his wife Anca Verma, as lodged by the anti-corruption agency of India, the CBI, for bribing defence officials for securing multi billion dollar weapons contracts of the Indian military establishment. In 2014, RAD Chairman Bodo Garbe and General Manager Gerhard Hoy were issued summons of the Indian courts. Subsequently a red-corner notice was issued for their detention through Interpol. In 2016, the case was under trial in Indian courts.

In 2024, Investigate Europe criticized that Rheinmetall has a parallel business that sells machinery and factories free from German export rules. Also in 2024, it was reported that Rheinmetall supplied weapons used by Israel during the Gaza war.

In July 2026, a group of activists staged a blockade outside Rheinmetall's office near Berlin's Brandenburg Gate to protest the company's arms production.

=== Controversy for financial investment ===
Various financial groups such as Nordea exclude Rheinmetall shares from their funds. Managers of equity funds such as defence ETFs define criteria that companies must meet in order for their shares to be included in their portfolios. The fund provider VanEck excludes companies from its selection process that are "proven to be involved in the manufacture of anti-personnel mines (Ottawa Treaty), cluster munitions (Oslo Convention), biological, chemical and incendiary weapons, nuclear weapons outside the Non-Proliferation Treaty, depleted uranium and white phosphorus. Such weapons are referred to as "controversial" in financial jargon. According to the sustainability agency ISS ESG (Institutional Shareholder Services Inc.), whose data VanEck uses, Rheinmetall is "demonstrably involved in the production of components for uranium ammunition through its subsidiary Nitrochemie".
