= Lorenzo Borgogni =

Italian businessman

Lorenzo Borgogni is an Italian businessman who was the longtime director of external relations at Finmeccanica, a partly government-owned company specialising in aerospace, defense and security.

In October 2011, Borgogni left his position at Finmeccanica after reports he was being investigated for alleged payment of bribes connected to Sistri, a waste-tracking system developed by a Finmeccanica subsidiary, SELEX Sistemi Integrati. In late 2012, Borgogni told Italian prosecutors that AgustaWestland, another subsidiary of Finmeccanica, had paid 51 million euros in kickbacks to win a helicopter contract with the government of India. These charges led to an international scandal and to extensive investigations by the authorities of both countries.

In 2014, Borgogni was arrested on corruption charges relating to the alleged Selex bribes. The newspaper La Repubblica described Borgogni as the "Deep Throat" of the AgustaWestland scandal.

== Early life and education ==
Lorenzo Borgogni is a native and resident of Siena Buonconvento, in Tuscany.

== Career ==
Borgogni was the director of external relations at Finmeccanica for nearly 20 years.

He took part in a meeting in March 2006 in Russia at which Russian-Italian projects, including the project to develop a Russian regional jet, were discussed. The Russian participants included Presidential aide Sergei Prikhodko, Minister for information technology and communications Leonid Reiman, Minister of industry and energy Viktor Khristenko, and Deputy foreign minister Aleksandr Grushko.

A 2011 article in Espresso described Borgogni's alleged role in the appointment of persons to the Board of Directors of Finmeccanica, who are technically named by the Italian Treasury. In reality, according to this report, Borgogni would essentially issue orders every year listing officials of various political parties who were to become directors of the firm.

Borgogni has also been president of the Accademia dei Risorti (Academy of the Resurrected).

== Selex scandal ==
In December 2009, the Finmeccanica subsidiary Selex Sistemi Integrati won a €400m contract to design, deploy, and maintain the Sistri system, which electronically tracks waste transportation and disposal. In 2011, during a struggle over control of the firm between chairman Pier Francesco Guarguaglini and Giuseppi Orsi, who succeeded him in November of that year, Italian authorities began investigating allegations of bribery in connection with the contract, and concluded that in order to process the bribes, massive slush funds had been established by means of a complex system of false invoicing, several sham firms had been set up in Delaware and other tax havens, and secret bank accounts had been opened in Switzerland. Borogni was one of the Finmeccanica officials who were targets of the investigation.

A report in The Hindu later stated that the "vast" Italian investigation into Finmecannica had begun in Naples as a search "for connections between the mafia, large Italian companies and the Italian government," and that as part of this investigation, investigators had "recorded the conversations of Lorenzo Borgogni, who at the time was responsible for 'Institutional Relations' (read contacts with government officials and politicians) for Finmeccanica." Emiliano Fittipaldi, an investigative journalist for Espresso, later told The Hindu "It was not surprising that the Naples investigators were digging into Lorenzo Borgogni," given that as the person responsible for "institutional relations," "he was a man who knew many secrets."

In October 2011, the same month in which two Selex managers were arrested as a result of the probe, Borgogni either was suspended from office by Orsi or resigned his position on orders from Orsi, after various media reported that he was being targeted "over alleged ethics violations" and had admitted to interrogators in Rome tho accepting millions of euros from companies that had received contracts from Finmeccanica.

On 22 November 2011 a report stated that Guarguaglini denied having "created illegal funds" or "paid or ordered anyone to pay money to politicians or political parties," and that Borgogni, who had not yet been charged or arrested, claimed not to have done anything illegal. Borgogni was suspended from office, at the request of the CEO Giuseppe Orsi, after newspapers published accounts of his interrogation in Rome, in which he admitted accepting millions of Euros from companies which received contracts from Finmeccanica. Through his lawyer Stephen Bortone, Borgogni said: "I never took bribes or made such a statement to anyone." Borgogni also asserted that he had never made any accusations about Guarguaglini or his wife, Marina Grossi.

== Helicopter scandal ==
In late 2011, Borgogni began telling Italian investigators about another alleged set of acts of corruption involving India's purchase the previous year of 12 AW101 helicopters for €560 million from Finmeccanica's helicopter unit, AgustaWestland. Borgogni provided them with details of kickbacks supposedly paid to Indian officials via an elaborate process in order to ensure their purchase of the helicopters. Borgogni supplied detailed information regarding the identities of the middlemen and the means by which AgustaWestland had distributed a total of 51 million euros in kickbacks to individuals in India. Borgogni told prosecutors that the slush funds had been established after a "sudden" 10 million euro per helicopter price hike in 2010.

According to India Today, Borgogni said that the two middlemen hired "to swing the Indian contract" were "Swiss businessmen Guido Ralph Haschke and Christian Michael," and the Italian investigation focused on recordings of conversations between Haschke and Michael and their contacts. It was alleged that the 51 million euros "were paid to, among others, Haschke, Carlo Gerosa (Haschke's partner), Giuseppe Orsi (Finmeccanica head), Bruno Spagnolini (AgustaWestland CEO) and several unnamed Indians."

Indian politician Ram Jethmalani wrote in 2012 that the Italian investigation had apparently been "triggered by in-house Finmeccanica rivalries," namely between Guarguaglini and Orsi. Jethmalani tied Borgogni's decision to "spill the beans" to the ouster of Silvio Berlusconi in November 2011, and to Borgogni's falling-out with Orsi, to whom he had close before Orsi apparently ordered him to resign. Fittipaldi described Borgogni as a "pentito" – "someone who repents and cooperates with the investigation in order to get a lesser sentence." According to Borgogni's charges, at least 10 million of the 51 million euros in kickbacks had been "funnelled back to Italy and paid to the Lega Nord party in return for its support to Orsi's bid to become president of Finmeccanica." One Indian report suggested that the charge that this sum had been paid to Lega Nord was "what is really novel about Borgogni's information." Guarguaglini denied on 22 November 2011 "that the company had set up slush funds or that he had given orders to pay off politicians."

Borgogni's disclosures led to what Outlook India described as "a full-fledged Italian investigation into alleged unethical dealings" by Finmeccanica. The focus of the probe was on Borgogni's "allegation that one of the middlemen, Guido Haschke, was hired as an 'intermediary' for a sum of 41 million euros," a sum that was allegedly "hiked at the last minute by 10 million euros," an increase that Italian investigators "zeroed in on" as evidence that company officials had used these fund to bribe Italian political parties "for plum postings." The Financial Times stated on 25 April 2012 that the probe, by Naples prosecutors, was focusing on Orsi and was a "formality." Finmeccanica dismissed Borgogni's charges as part of a personal vendetta against Orsi for having compelled his resignation.

Borgogni's disclosures led to what Outlook India described as "a full-fledged Italian investigation into alleged unethical dealings" by Finmeccanica. The focus of the probe was on Borgogni's "allegation that one of the middlemen, Guido Haschke, was hired as an 'intermediary' for a sum of 41 million euros," a sum that was allegedly "hiked at the last minute by 10 million euros," an increase that Italian investigators "zeroed in on" as evidence that company officials had used these fund to bribe Italian political parties "for plum postings." The Financial Times stated on 25 April 2012 that the probe, by Naples prosecutors, was focusing on Orsi and was a "formality." Finmeccanica dismissed Borgogni's charges as part of a personal vendetta against Orsi for having compelled his resignation.

Finmeccanica said Borgogni had admitted receiving millions of euros in "consultancy" fees from suppliers in a "clear breach of Finmeccanica's code of ethics" and that it was considering taking legal action against him. Borgogni denied acting illegally, and confirmed that he had given the Naples prosecutors information and documents relating to Haschke and another unnamed "intermediary." Another 25 April 2012 report stated that Naples prosecutors following up Borgogni's accusations were gathering evidence in Switzerland about Finmeccanina's alleged Swiss bank accounts.

Borgogni said in testimony in a Naples court on 15 November 2012 that there were "agreements" between certain officials at AgustaWestland and Guido Haschke and Michel Christian, purportedly providing for the payment of 41 million euros in bribes to these two individuals, a sum that was later allegedly raised to 51 million euros. During cross-examination, he acknowledged that his testimony about bribery was based on "rumours" he had heard at Finmeccanica and that he was not sure of the amounts of the bribes.

An Indian newspaper stated on 13 February 2013 that Italian prosecutors had been "on the corruption trail for the last two years after former head of Finmeccanica's external relations wing Lorenzo Borgogni made disclosures about the payment of 51million Euros." As a result of their investigation of Borgogni's charges, Italian police in April 2013 arrested several individuals on suspicion of such crimes as criminal association, false invoicing, and corruption. At the time of the arrests, sources said that the false invoicing amounted to €40m. In January 2014, the Indian government canceled the helicopter deal with AgustaWestland. On 17 March 2014 a Milan court ruled in favor of AgustaWestland in a case in which the Indian Ministry of Defense sought to recover some €278 million in bank guarantees over the scrapped helicopter deal. The next day, Indian authorities said they would appeal the verdict.

On 30 September 2014, in his final summation in the trial of Orsi on the charges stemming from Borgogni's accusations, Orsi's defense lawyer Ennio Amodio said that Orsi was innocent of all charges. Amodio said, "Orsi believed his role was to clean up old corruption and to do this he got rid of 40 people," including Borgogni, and insisted that Borgogni had only leveled accusations against Orsi "because he had been ousted by Orsi." On 9 October 2014 Orsi and his co-defendant, former AgustaWestland executive Bruno Spagnolini, were both sentenced to two years in prison for false bookkeeping and acquitted of international corruption in the helicopter case. Eventually, on 8 January 2018, the third Court of Appeals of Milan acquitted the defendants on all charges, including those of false bookkeeping. https://web.archive.org/web/20200906183548/https://in.reuters.com/article/leonardo-india-corruption-trial/italian-court-clears-former-leonardo-bosses-in-india-corruption-case-idINKBN1EX159?il=0 Guido Ralph Haschke, who had been accused by Borgogni of being a middleman in the helicopter deal, was fully and finally acquitted of all charges by the Appeals Court of Brescia on June 30, 2025, thus proving Borgogni's accusations to be false. https://www.reuters.com/business/aerospace-defense/italy-court-acquits-consultant-india-helicopter-case-2025-07-01/

== Arrest ==
On 24 March 2014 Italian police arrested Borgogni and Stefano Carlini, a former director of Finmeccanica's electronics unit, Selex Service Management, on charges of criminal association and corruption in relation to the development of the Sistri system. Both men were accused of "paying bribes and siphoning money off to foreign bank accounts." The arrest had nothing to do with the helicopter scandal. Two entrepreneurs were also arrested at the same time in connection with the probe. Borgogni was placed under house arrest. Rome businessmen Vincenzo Angeloni and Luigi Malavisi had already been arrested for playing a part in the bribery, while Guarguaglini remained under investigation. According to The Local, "Borgogni and the others were believed to have created a system of false invoicing between Selex and other companies, and in order to cover this up they had created false businesses in Delaware and deposited money in Switzerland." In addition to arresting Borgogni and his alleged accomplices, police "seized 28 bank accounts and two safe-deposit boxes." According to Defense News, Italian magistrates suspected that money in large slush funds related to the Sistri matter had ended up "in the coffers of Italian political parties."

Finmeccanica said it had sued "certain suppliers" for damages in relation to the Sistri case. It was reported in late March 2014 that Borgogni was "due to be questioned by investigators on April 1."

== Other controversies ==
As of November 2011, Borgogni was "under investigation over possible illicit payments as part of a criminal inquiry in Rome into contracts for Enav SpA, Italy's air-traffic control agency." Borgogni said in a statement about the investigation that he had "always acted with respect for the law and in the best interest" of Finmeccanica. In the Enav case, a prosecutor asked for Borgogni's imprisonment in connection with charges of illegal payments to political parties, but a juge decided that such a measure was not yet necessary. head of external relations of Finmeccanica are mentioned as suspects for illegal financing of political parties.

Borgogni's Accademia dei Risorti and a firm called Poyel Produzioni produced a 2013 film called "Giallo Toscano" (Yellow Tuscan") with the collaboration of the municipality of Milan and the Milanese company On Air, and with the support of the region of Tuscany and of the Tuscan Film Commission. An Italian film periodical described the movie as Borgogni's attempt to lend a helping hand to his native region in a time of crisis. A minor controversy developed in January 2014, however, over the fact that the Tuscan government and film commission had given tens of thousands of euros to support Borgogni's production despite the fact that he was under investigation for criminal activities. Also a source of controversy was that a partner of Borgogni in the production of the film was Paolo Oliverio, who had been arrested in November 2013 on charges of kidnapping.
