= Shrikant Verma =

Indian poet

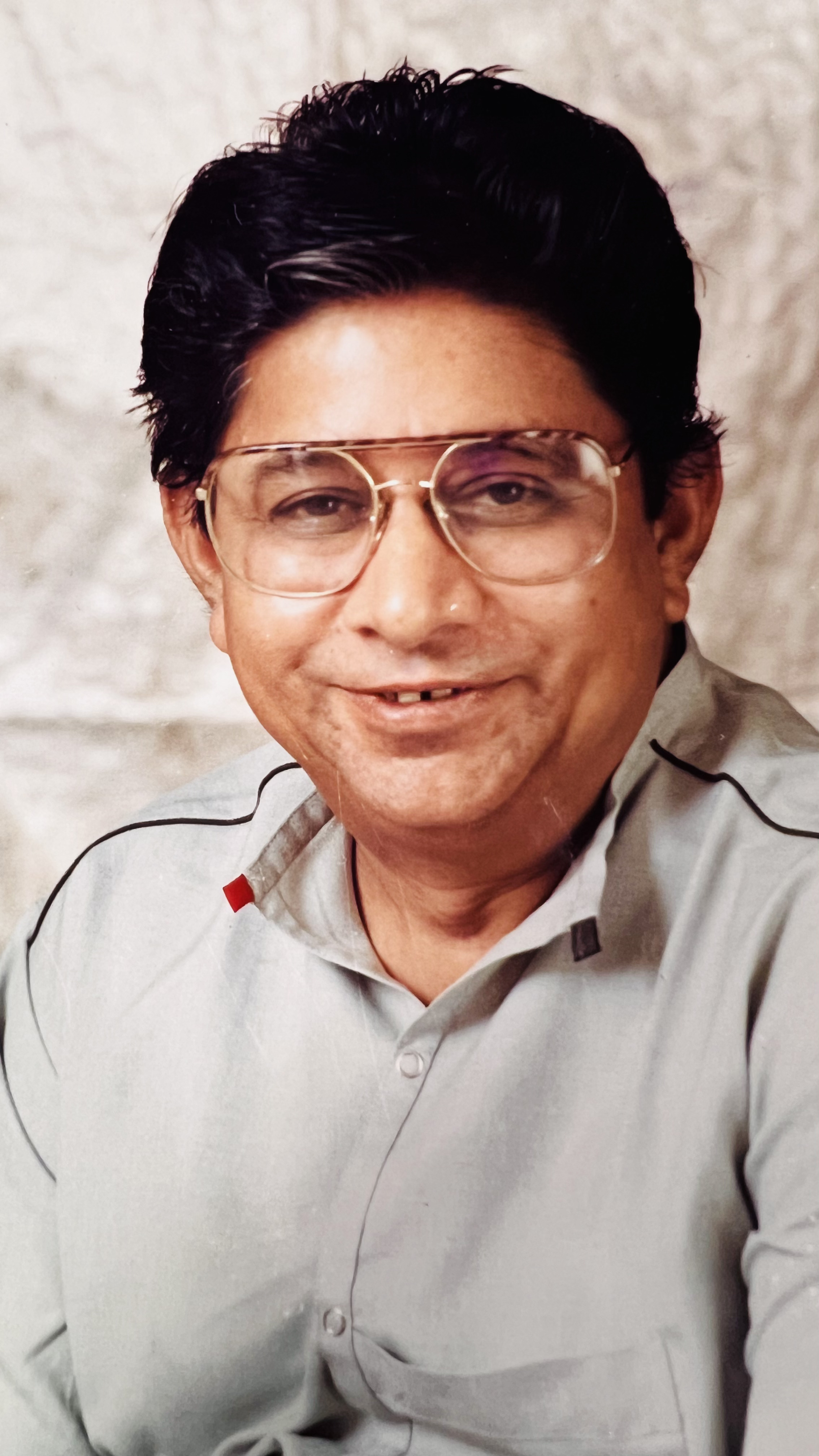
- Born: 18 September 1931; Bilaspur, Chhattisgarh
- Died: 25 May 1986 (aged 54); New York, US
- Education: MA Hindi (Hons) Nagpur University
- Occupations: Poet; Politician
- Known for: Nai Kavita
- Notable work: Magadh Jalsaghar Maya Darpan Apollo Ka Rath Doosri Bar
- Spouse: Veena Verma
- Children: Abhishek Verma
- Website: https://thevermafamily.org

Shrikant Verma (18 September 1931 – 25 May 1986) was an Indian poet and a Member of Parliament from Madhya Pradesh as a Congress party candidate from 1976 to 1982 and 1982 to 1986. Verma died of cancer in 1986 in New York.

== Biography ==
Verma was born in Bilaspur in a Kayastha family. He graduated from Nagpur University with a Master of Arts degree in Hindi. He has authored twenty books.

== Personal life ==
Verma married to Veena Verma in 1967, who later was elected Member of Parliament for three consecutive terms from the state of Madhya Pradesh. Verma's only child, Abhishek Verma was declared the youngest billionaire of India in 1997.

== Awards and honours ==
Verma was awarded Tulsi Samman for Jalsagar from Madhya Pradesh Government in 1976 and Shiksha Samman from Madhya Pradesh State Kala Parishad in 1981. In 1982, he presided over the Afro-Asian Writer's Conference hosted in New Delhi. In 1987, he was posthumously awarded the Sahitya Academy Award for Magadh.

== Legacy ==
A philanthropic foundation, Shrikant Verma Trust, was set up by Verma's son Abhishek Verma in 1989 to further the cause of arts, literature and journalism in the memory of his father and it continues to support initiatives in education, literature, fine arts, cultural heritage and community welfare. The trust is run by Verma's daughter in law Anca Verma, who collaborates on global campaigns such as 'HungerFreeWorld' that is managed by Verma's granddaughter Nicolle Verma.

Bilaspur city named the central vista as 'Shrikant Verma Marg' and in 1992 the then Sunder Lal Patwa, Chief Minister of Madhya Pradesh unveiled a 30 feet statue of Verma at Shrikant Verma chowk.
