= Veena Birbal =

Indian jurist

Justice (Retd.) Veena Birbal

Judge of the Delhi High Court
- In office 31 August 2007 – 30 June 2014
- Nominated by: Ramesh Chandra Lahoti
- Appointed by: A. P. J. Kalam

Personal details
- Born: 1 July 1952 (age 74)
- Education: University of Delhi

Veena Birbal (born 1 July 1952) is a former judge of the Delhi High Court in India, and the former president of the Delhi State Consumer Disputes Redressal Commission. She has adjudicated in a number of significant Indian cases concerning criminal offences and corruption, including the Scorpene deal scam, the 2G spectrum case, the Nitish Katara murder case, and the Uphaar Cinema Fire litigation.

== Judicial career ==
Birbal enrolled with the Bar Council of Delhi in 1978, and practiced law at the Delhi High Court, Supreme Court of India and other courts and tribunals in Delhi. In 1992, she was appointed as a District and Sessions judge in Delhi, and became the judge in charge of the Karkardooma courts in 2006. Between 2003 and 2006, she was deputed by the Delhi High Court to act as the Secretary for Law, Justice and Legislative Affairs in the Government of Delhi. She was appointed to the Delhi High Court on 31 August 2007, and retired on 30 June 2014.

=== Delhi High Court ===
As a High Court judge, Birbal briefly adjudicated over an appeal in the 2G spectrum case, during which she publicly rebuked former Tamil Nadu Chief Minister M. Karunanidhi's wife, Dayalu Ammal, for failing to appear in hearings. The day after this, Birbal recused herself from the case, without disclosing any reasons for her recusal. Birbal, along with another judge, Sanjay Kishan Kaul, also dismissed a case filed against INC leader Sonia Gandhi, in which the petitioner had argued that she should be disqualified as a member of Parliament for receiving the Order of Leopold from the Government of Belgium.

Birbal also adjudicated in a number of public interest litigations during her career as a High Court judge, and has, amongst other cases, ordered mandatory age tests for juvenile cricket teams to prevent fraud and directed the Central Bureau of Investigation to re-investigate allegations of corruption against government officials concerning the acquisition of Scorpene submarines for the Indian Navy. In 2010, Birbal refused to allow physically challenged candidates appearing for medical school entrance exams any concessions in qualifications.

In addition, Birbal also adjudicated a number of significant criminal cases, including the Nitish Katara murder case, the Uphaar Cinema Fire litigation, and a widely reported hit-and-run case in Delhi in 2008, involving a man who was later convicted for killing two people after ramming into them with his BMW car.

Along with another judge, Badar Durrez Ahmed, she also reversed a widely reported order from the Delhi State Consumer Dispute Redressal Commission, directing all cellular and mobile network operators in India to compensate customers with Rs.5,000 for each unsolicited message or call received, holding that the Commission lacked jurisdiction to pass this order.

=== Delhi SCDRC ===
Following her retirement from the Delhi High Court, Birbal was appointed as the presiding judge in the Delhi State Consumer Dispute Redressal Commission ("Delhi SCDRC") and oversaw plans for the expansion of the SCDRC to include more benches to hear consumer complaints. She also notably upheld a district consumer forum's order to the Indian Railways, directing them to compensate a former judge and his family with Rs.60,000 for inconvenience caused by a last-minute change in seats.

== Life ==
Birbal's father, Hari Chand Mehta, was also a lawyer and practiced in Delhi. Birbal earned a B.Sc. from Miranda House, and an LL.B. from the Faculty of Law at the University of Delhi.
