= Abhishek Verma =

Abhishek Verma may refer to:

- Abhishek Verma (archer) (born 1989), Indian archer
- Abhishek Verma (arms dealer) (born 1968), Indian arms dealer
- Abhishek Verma (sport shooter), Indian sport shooter
