= Archika Sudhanshu =

Personal life
- Born: Delhi, India
- Parent(s): Sudhanshu Ji Maharaj (father), Richa Devi (mother)
- Citizenship: India
- Education: Higher education in holistic sciences, PhD in Meditation and Yogic Sciences
- Occupation: Meditation and spiritual leader
- Website: Official website

Religious life
- Religion: Hinduism

Religious career
- Organization: Vishwa Jagriti Mission

Archika Sudhanshu known as Dr. Archika Didi, is an Indian meditation and spiritual leader. She serves as the Vice Chairperson of Vishwa Jagriti Mission and is involved in conducting meditation sessions, mind training program and spiritual discourses. She conducts meditation and social service programs through the organization. She is the elder daughter of Sudhanshu Ji Maharaj, the founder of Vishwa Jagriti Mission.

== Early life and education ==
Archika was born in India to Sudhanshu Ji Maharaj and Richa Devi. Her father is a preacher. She pursued higher education in holistic and yogic sciences and obtained a doctoral degree in Meditation and Yogic Sciences. Her academic work has included research on meditation, and holistic living.

== Career ==
Archika serves as the Vice Chairperson of Vishwa Jagriti Mission (VJM). In this role, she is involved in the organization's educational, meditation, and social service activities. She has participated in the development of meditation-related programmes and has delivered lectures on subjects including the Bhagavad Gita, and meditation.

=== Meditation programmes ===
Archika has developed and delivered meditation-based programmes through Vishwa Jagriti Mission. Among the programmes linked to her are Blissful Living Meditation, Master Your Emotions, and Reprogram Your Mind.

She has conducted more than 2,000 meditation camps across various states in India and over 500 internationally, including in the United States, the United Kingdom, Canada, the United Arab Emirates, and Hong Kong.

=== Kailash Manasarovar Yatra ===
Since 2017, she has organized and led group pilgrimages to the Kailash Manasarovar Yatra. The pilgrimages include visits to Mount Kailash and Lake Manasarovar and follow the traditional route and rituals associated with the Yatra, including the parikrama (circumambulation) of Mount Kailash. The programme also incorporates meditation sessions and related spiritual practices conducted at various stages of the journey. Preparatory sessions have been held for participants prior to the pilgrimage, including in Kathmandu before the final phase of the Yatra.

== Research and publications ==
She authored the study "Impact of Yoga on Periodontal Disease and Stress Management," which was published in the International Journal of Yoga (2017).

She is the author of A Yogic Living (2017), a book of yoga and meditation.

== Bibliography ==
- A Yogic Living (2017)
- Kailash – Param Chetna Ka Urja Kendra (2026)

== Awards ==
Archika Sushanshu received the Dinkar Sahitya Samman in 2012 from the President of India, Pranab Mukherjee, at the Rashtrapati Bhavan in New Delhi.
