= Veena Verma (politician) =

Indian politician (1941–2024)

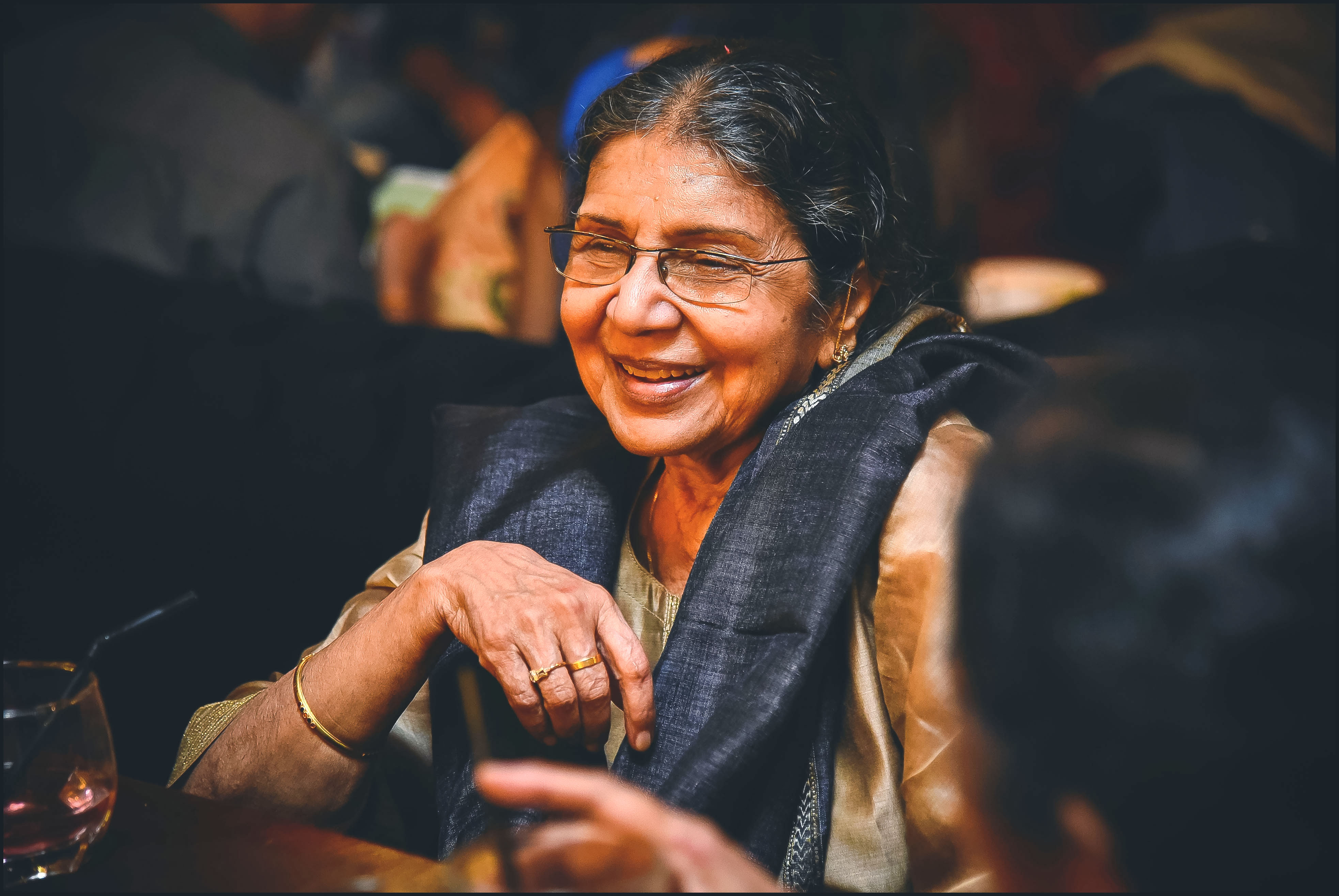
Verma in 2016

Veena Verma (1 September 1941 – 6 February 2024) was an Indian politician who was a member of parliament from Madhya Pradesh as an Indian National Congress candidate. She was elected to the Rajya Sabha for three consecutive six-year terms, from 1986 to 2000. She served as the Deputy Chairman of Committee of Parliament on Official Language and also as the Vice-president of All India Mahila Congress and the Indian Council of World Affairs.

Verma was the widow of Shrikant Verma (1931–1986), Hindi poet and fellow member of parliament from Madhya Pradesh. Verma was the mother of Billionaire Abhishek Verma, an Indian arms dealer. Verma’s daughter-in-law Anca Verma is former Miss Universe Romania.

Verma died after a prolonged illness in Delhi, on 6 February 2024, at the age of 82.
