= Ravi Shankaran =

Indian spy

Lt. Commander Ravi Shankaran (Retd.) (born 1964) is a decorated ex-Indian Naval clearance diving officer who is allegedly an arms dealer now and the prime accused in a case of military espionage for commercial purposes which has international implications. Shankaran was a London-based NRI business man and is the only one to have escaped the dragnet of the Income Tax, CBI and Interpol for his role in masterminding now what is known as the Navy War Room Leak Case.

He is the prime accused in the "Naval war room spy scandal", which is linked to the Scorpene deal scam. In this case, a number of documents stolen from the Navy war room were leaked to Thales, the maker of Scorpène-class submarine enabling them to clinch a Euro 3 Billion Submarine Deal with the Indian Navy. Shankaran is a retired naval officer of the 67th NDA Course whose parents lived in Pune and took early retirement from the Indian Navy for Medical Reasons. While in the Navy he moonlighted in commercial diving, and was a regular on the Mumbai party scene, being particularly popular amongst affluent women. Like many other retired naval officers he then opened a naval-supply and Salvage business, starting a company called Shanks Oceaneering. The business was soon doing well and Shankaran became well known for his party lifestyle; becoming known by his preferred nickname, Shanx.

== Naval War Room Leak ==
In October 2005, DNA magazine reported that some documents were allegedly leaked on a USB pen drive from the Directorate of Naval operations in New Delhi (also called the Navy War Room). However, they were intercepted by air force intelligence from the house of Wing Commander S L Surve. The documents, which dealt with Indian defence purchases, were related to India's future defence preparedness plan and were passed on to billionaire arms dealer Abhishek Verma, Ravi Shankaran and Kulbhushan Prashar, an associate of Ravi Shankaran, who was also an ex naval officer.

After the leak was exposed, the Navy conducted its in-house investigation, and in December 2005, it sacked three officers, Vijendra Rana of the Marine Commando Force, Vinod Kumar Jha, a navigation and operations specialist and Captain Kashyap Kumar, another navigations and operations specialist, without any trial, who were then arrested and incarcerated behind bars for varying periods. All three are now out on bail. Officially, the reason given for their dismissal under the rarely used "President's 'Pleasure" clause, was because they had leaked classified information after accepting gratification, and this may affect the "security of the State", but the lack of criminal charges against the three has been very surprising. In fact, the navy did not pass on the case to the nodal investigative agency, the Central Bureau of Investigations until nearly a year had passed after the initial break., while others hinted that the investigation may have been deliberately delayed, possibly to protect Shankaran.

When questioned why the involved civilians had not been charged criminally, defence minister Pranab Mukherjee, told CNN-IBN's Karan Thapar in 2006: "Why does action have to be taken against them (civilians)? This is commercial information. People want to have commercial information. They deployed their services."

After a string of articles in the Outlook magazine about Navy War Room Leak Case being related to the Scorpene Kick Back Case where a commission of US$165 million was paid to Shankaran, Verma and their Accomplices, investigations were handed over to the CBI. After raids were conducted in 20 offices and residences nationwide of Shankaran his business partner, retired Commander Kulbhushan Parashar was arrested in April 2006 at the Indira Gandhi Airport in New Delhi on his arrival from London where he had met Shankaran. The large number of documents uncovered by the CBI resulted in many more arrests such as Abhishek Verma and Wing Commander S.L. Surve. Also arrested was Rajrani Jaiswal from Pune, who was apparently used by Kulbushan Parashar as a "honey trap". Surve, who was posted as joint director (air defence) in the Air HQ, was so besotted with Rajrani that Surve's wife complained to the IAF about them. Eventually Surve was fired.

Unable to secure Ravi Shankaran's presence for further investigations the CBI cancelled his passport and successfully got Interpol to issue a worldwide Red Corner Notice for his immediate arrest in 2006.

The CBI was also successful in seizing and attaching all properties and assets owned by Ravi Shankaran including his bank accounts and cars in India as well as overseas. Based on Kulbhushan Parashar's confession that he had met Shankaran in London, the CBI through the Scotland Yard were successful in obtaining a UK arrest warrant from a Judge at the Westminster Court. The CBI claimed that "the warrant as a major step towards his apprehension and extradition. Shankaran's arrest could open up further leads in the case".

In spite of an International Interpol and UK arrest warrant Ravi Shankaran allegedly managed to give the authorities a slip and moved to Europe without valid travel documents. He was successfully tracked by CBI using Technical Surveillance Intelligence to France, Spain, and Norway and after trailing him for over four months, the CBI found him in Sweden where he was nearly detained but managed to evade the authorities. CBI officials said that they were confident of getting Shankaran extradited to India and termed his "vanishing act" as a temporary phase till the law caught up with him.

In Dec 2007, Arun Prakash responded to a biased article in the Outlook Magazine which tried to imply that the CBI had found evidence of him helping Ravi Shankaran escape Justice by a public statement quoting a CBI document:

The investigation so far, leading to the filing of two charge sheets has not revealed any incriminating act on the part of Admiral Arun Prakash with regard to this conspiracy.

CBI has so far filed 2 charge sheets in this case. No charge sheet has been filed against Capt. Kashyap Kumar, Rajrani and Mukesh Bajaj (mentor of Rajrani;now dead) as nothing incriminating related to this case was found. VK Jha has not been charged with espionage but for negligence as IT head leading to leakage.

It appears that Shankaran and Parashar, both of whom had taken early retirement from the navy, had convinced their friends commander Vijendra Rana to enable the copying of classified information from the Navy War room in the South Block. Eight pen drives were used to carry the information to their contacts in international armament companies interested in selling to India. Only two of the eight pen drives could be recovered.

=== Arrest in London ===
In April 2010, four years after the Interpol Red corner notice had been issued against him, Ravi Shankaran gave himself up voluntarily in London. Reports indicate that he was being extradited via proceedings in the court of District Magistrate, Westminister's Court, London. However, in over nearly 3 years, he is yet to be extradited as of January 2013. On 30 December 2011, the London Court has held that there is prima facie answerable case against Shankaran but it also allowed him to refute the same at the next hearing. Now Shankaran has claimed in the court that since his assets are frozen he may be granted Legal Aid which was accepted by the Court. Meanwhile, he is on bail in London with restrictions. On 27 March 2013, Shankaran's appeal against extradition was turned down by the Westminster Magistrates Court in London. Theresa May, Home Secretary of Britain is now expected to take a final call on the extradition . According to a British Home Office spokesperson, the Secretary of State on 22 May signed an order for Ravi Shankaran's extradition to India. Shankaran has been given 14 days to move an appeal against this order.

=== Appeal in UK High Court ===
In a major setback to the CBI, the case against Ravi Shankaran said to be the key accused in the Navy War Room Leak Case, was rejected by the England and Wales High Court on 1 April 2014. In addition, the judges, Lord Brian Leveson and Mr. Justice Blake, ordered the CBI to pay Shankaran Rs. 10 million in legal costs. They also said there was no prima facie case against him. Shankaran had appealed to the High Court after an extradition order passed by Home Secretary Theresa May in May 2013. The order came after the decisions of District Judge Nicholas Evans at the Westminster Magistrates Court in December 2011 and again in March 2013. The High Court's order over-ruled both Judge Evans' ruling and the extradition order. The judges re-examined the evidence to establish that no prima facie case existed for extradition of Ravi Shankaran. The CBI further failed to file an appeal in the UK Supreme Court within the 14 days deadline, since it kept waiting for a legal opinion that never came thereby making the UK High Court order rejecting its request for Shankaran's extradition final. The CBI is now examining whether there was any lapse in recording a key witness statement properly. The agency might also re-examine the grounds on which four senior agency officials, who were part of the case's probe, had subsequently received the President's gold medal for their work. The CBI is also examining the Shankaran's claim of having filed a complaint against an agency case investigator in the Indian trial court for allegedly submitting fake evidence in a UK court in May 2011.

=== Present Status ===
The CBI now with the help of the UK Government is exploring the option of getting Shankaran de-ported as his passport has been cancelled by the Indian Government. CBI sources stated that "The agency sleuths may initiate the process of his deportation through diplomatic channel. This aspect is also being examined by the legal wing of the agency. Nothing has been finalised so far," . With the extradition case against him firmly closed, Shankaran now inhabits a strange British netherworld inhabited by music director Nadeem Saifi. One-half of the famous music duo Nadeem-Shravan, he has lived in London since 1997 when he was named prime accused in the murder of music baron Gulshan Kumar. Nadeem resisted attempts by the Mumbai Police to extradite him in 2001. He cannot return to India because of an arrest warrant against him. A similar fate awaits Shankaran. Now, in a dramatic twist, the CBI's quarry has turned on his pursuers. In a two-page statement sent to India today on 16 April, Shankaran charged CBI with producing false evidence to try and extradite him. "During the extradition trial, the appellant provided the UK court evidence under Freedom of Information Act which showed that many of the CBI submissions in the UK court or in the extradition request were simply false." Shankaran claims he has received a UK High Court directive to CPS to reimburse the 125,000 pound (Rs. 12 million) legal expenses he incurred in fighting the extradition case. It is not clear whether CPS will recover these costs from the Indian authorities but if it does, it will be a second big embarrassment for CBI.
