= Sudhanshu =

Sudhanshu may refer to:

- Sudhanshu Dhulia, Indian judge
- Sudhanshu ji, Indian preacher
- Sudhanshu Rai, Indian film director
