= Giuseppe Orsi =

Italian engineer and businessman

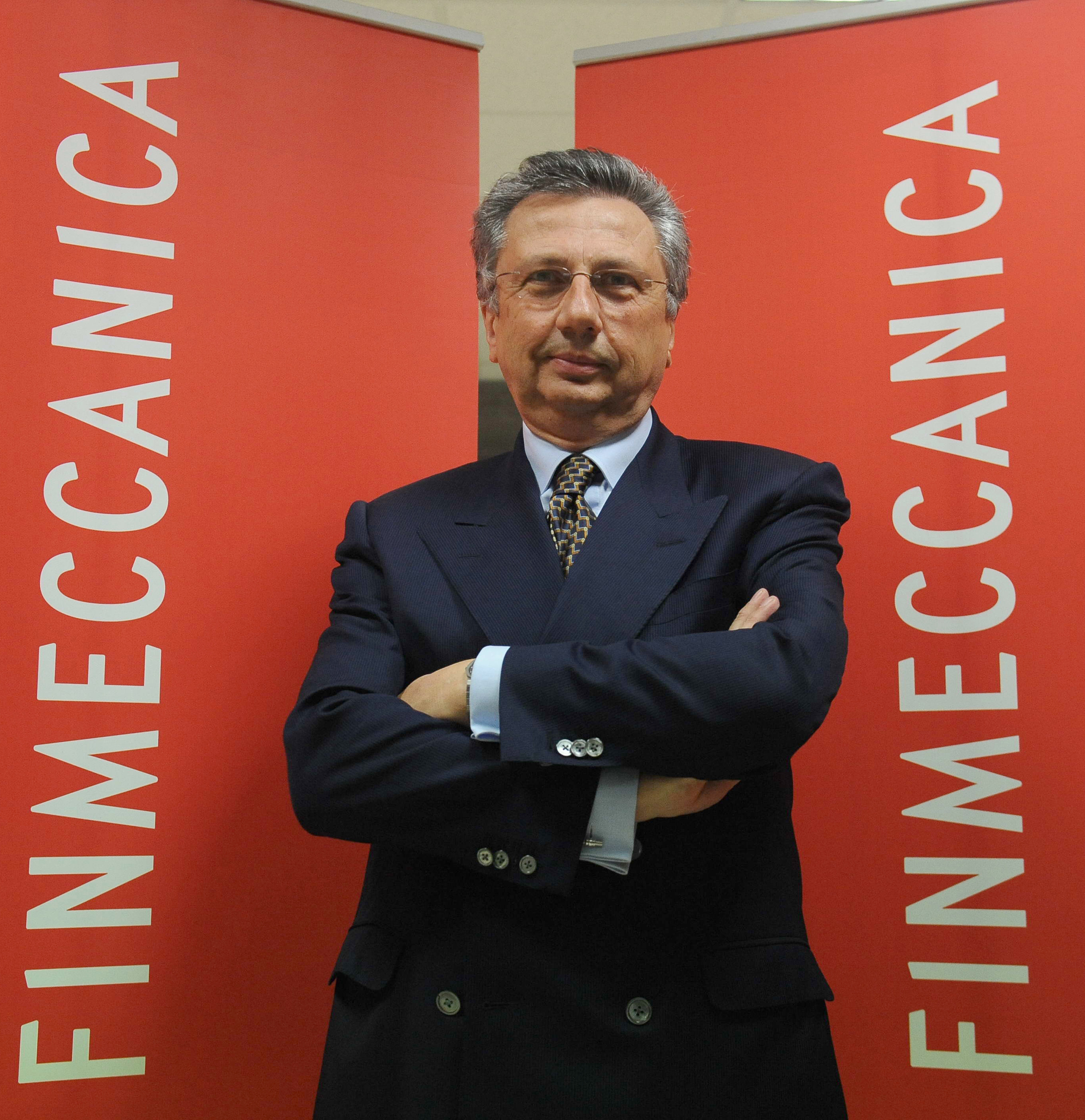
- Born: 24 November 1945 (age 80); Piacenza, Italy
- Occupation: Former Finmeccanica CEO
- Website: www.leonardocompany.com

Giuseppe Orsi (born 24 November 1945 in Piacenza) is an Italian engineer, businessman, and corporate executive. He was chief executive officer (CEO) and chairman of Finmeccanica from 2011 to 2013, and CEO of AgustaWestland from 2004 to 2011.

== Education ==
Giuseppe Orsi is a graduate of Politecnico di Milano, where he received a doctorate in Aeronautical Engineering. Following university, he attended the Wharton School at the University of Pennsylvania, where he specialized in Finance and Management.

He also was an officer in the Italian Air Force and is a qualified civil pilot.

== Career ==
Orsi began his career in 1973 at SIAI-Marchetti, (subsequently incorporated into Agusta) where he was product support director.

Following the reorganisation of the Agusta companies into a centralised management structure in 1984, he was promoted to the Marketing and Strategies Directorate, where he managed Agusta's international network of sales and representative offices. Three years later, he was appointed sales director of Agusta's Aircraft Division with responsibility for worldwide market development, strategy, and negotiation.

In June 1989, he was elected president and chief executive officer of Agusta Aerospace Corporation (AgustaWestland's North American production plant in Philadelphia) and in January 1994 he joined the reorganised Agusta International Sales Department as senior vice president, government sales and programs. In 1997, as deputy general manager of Agusta, he managed the company's presence in the international market and negotiated a joint venture with Bell Helicopters involving Tiltrotor and AB139 helicopters, saying that "Consolidating ownership of the AB139 will provide a single face to the customer, leading to increased sales and greater customer satisfaction related to follow-on support services."

In 2001, as managing director of marketing and sales, he was part of the Agusta and Westland (AgustaWestland) merger and he subsequently joined the 'Management Committee'. A year later he was appointed managing director of Agusta and COO of AgustaWestland's Italian operations. In 2001, as managing director of marketing and sales, he was part of the merger of Agusta and Westland into AgustaWestland and subsequently joined the firm's management committee. A year later he was appointed managing director of Agusta SpA and COO of AgustaWestland's Italian operations. In 2004, he was appointed CEO of AgustaWestland, a post he held until 2011. During this period, AgustaWestland experienced significant growth in terms of sales, profit, EBIT, and cash flow.

In 2011 he was appointed chief executive officer and chairman of Finmeccanica SpA. He was made CEO and chairman at a time when Finmeccanica had "endured years of scandal related to allegations of kickbacks, management impropriety and other problems connected to Orsi’s predecessor as CEO, Pier Francesco Guarguaglini, and the political leadership of Italy’s former prime minister, Silvio Berlusconi." Although these scandals pre-dated Orsi, he had "not yet escaped taint," according to analysts. When Orsi took control of the firm, he sought to restructure it by selling off its "non-core divisions, including energy-engineering-services provider Ansaldo Energia, transportation-technology company Ansaldo STS and train and tram maker AnsaldoBreda." Orsi's restructuring plan for Finmeccanica reportedly "harmed his support within the firm.

In October 2011, Orsi forced the resignation of Lorenzo Borgogni, Finmeccanica's longtime head of external relations, after the latter admitted to interrogators that he had taken millions of euros in bribes from companies that had received Finmeccanica contracts.

== Investigation of Indian helicopter sale ==
Prosecutors in Naples began investigating Orsi in the spring of 2011, shortly after he was promoted from CEO of AgustaWestland to CEO of Finmeccanica. Prosecutors were looking into whether AgustaWestland paid bribes to secure the €560 million sale of 12 helicopters to the Indian government and, if so, what role Orsi had in this scheme.

On 13 February, the Finmeccanica board appointed group COO and CFO Alessandro Pansa to replace Orsi. Two days later, the firm announced that Orsi had resigned as chairman and a board member.

Orsi went on trial in Milan on June 2013, on charges of fraud and corruption. In 9 October 2014, Orsi were sentenced to two years in prison for false bookkeeping, and acquitted of international corruption in the helicopter case.

In December 2016, the Italian Supreme Court (Corte di Cassazione) annulled the verdict and ordered a retrial. In January 2018, following the new appeal trial, Orsi was acquitted of both international corruption and false invoicing charges. The acquittal was confirmed by the Supreme Court the following year.

== Awards ==
- 2005: he was awarded the Star of Merit for Labour (Italian: Stella al merito del lavoro)
- Since 2008: member of the Royal Aeronautical Society (FRAeS)
- 2010:
  - he was named a 'Freeman of the City of London' by the Mayor of London
  - he was appointed as a Commander of the Most Excellent Order of the British Empire (CBE)
- 2012: Order of Honour
- 2020: Premio Città di Sesto Calende
