= SISTRI =

The SISTRI (waste tracking system) is an information system that was developed by the Italian Ministry of Environment to monitor hazardous and non-hazardous waste's traceability. The project started in 2009, with the intent of innovating and modernize the Public Administration, with the computerization of the waste chain at a national level, and of the Campania Region’s urban waste. Subjects obliged to adhere:

- Initial producers of hazardous waste
- Initial producers of non-hazardous waste (with over 10 employees)
- Campania Region
- Waste dealers and brokers
- Consortiums
- Professional freight
- Intermodal waste freight transporters
- Transporters of their own produced hazardous waste
- Recovery and Disposal plants

Subjects with optional adherence:

- Initial producers of non-hazardous waste (with less than 10 employees or farmers)
- Transporters of their own produced non-hazardous waste

The SISTRI is meant to simplify the existent paper process, which is not capable of giving information on the movement in real time, but only delayed data of often days or weeks.

The introduction of the computerized system would provide a number of benefits:

- Reducing the workload for all the companies operating in the waste chain (with almost the entire removal of paper documentation)
- Reduction of costs throughout the waste chain operators to comply with the existent regulations
- Fighting waste illegality and especially illegal dumping of waste
- To simplify the controls on the waste chain from the Italian Government supervisors.

== Problems designing and implementing the system ==
Due to a series of problems of design and implementation, users testing the system before the official launching date lamented a series of defects on the operability of it. The original launch date was set to October 1, 2010. It was then postponed a number of times, with the proposed date as of May 2018 now January 1, 2019.
