= The Outlook Magazine =

Chinese lifestyle magazine

The Outlook Magazine is a Chinese creative lifestyle magazine.

The Outlook has been published in Shanghai continuously since October 2002 by Modern Media Group. The editor-in-chief is Jiaojiao Chen and the art director is Peng Yangjun; both of them used to be authors of COLORS magazine during 2006 to 2008. As winner for The Society of Publishers in Asia's Awards for Editorial Excellence, it was also recognized as a "new generation Chinese magazine" in 2009 by Wallpaper.
