= Abhishek Verma (arms dealer) =

Indian arms dealer and politician

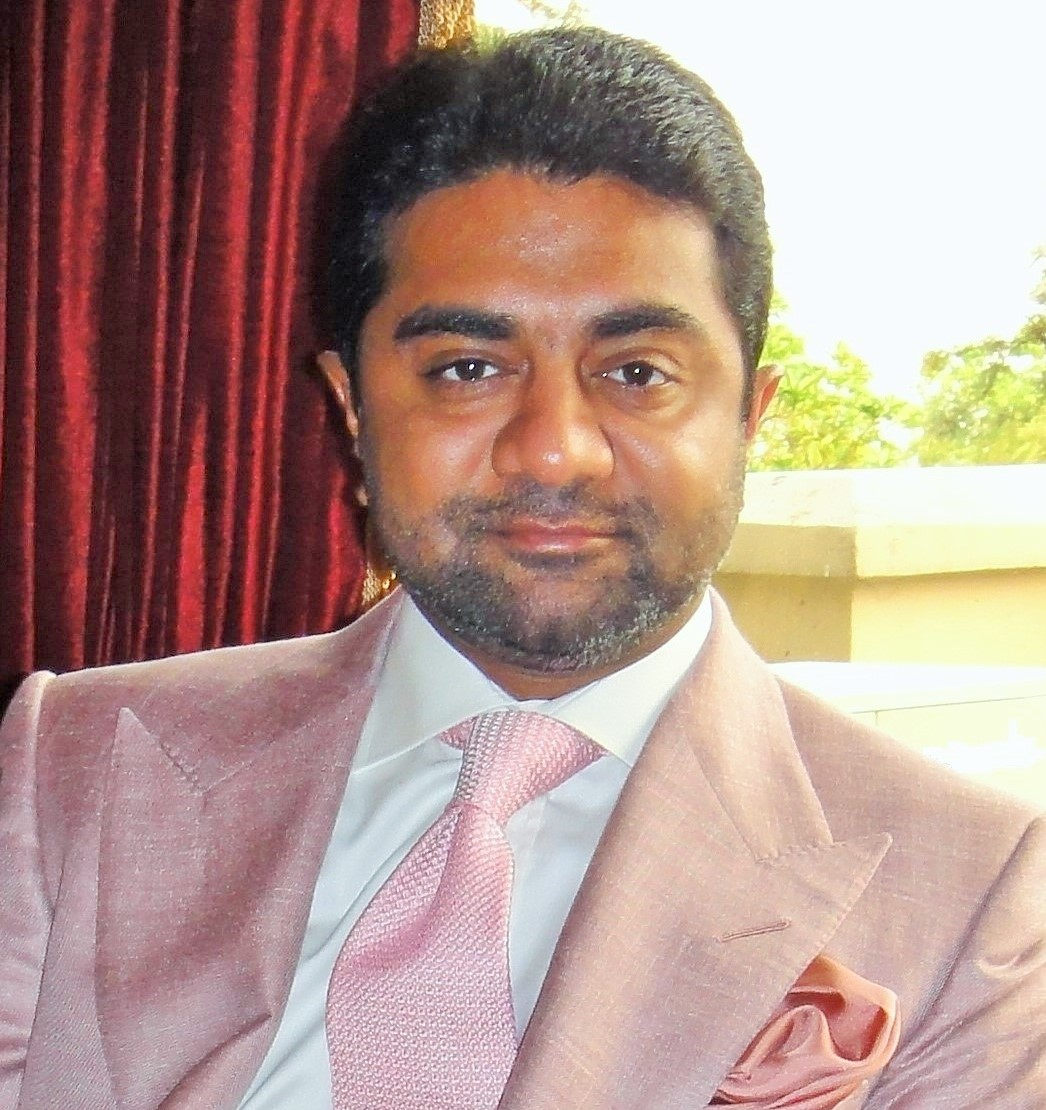
- Born: 23 February 1968 (age 58); New Delhi, India
- Occupation: Politician
- Organization: Shrikant Verma Trust
- Known for: Being the prime suspect in Scorpene deal scam
- Spouse: Anca Verma (m. 2006)
- Parents: Shrikant Verma (father); Veena Verma (mother)

Abhishek Verma (born 23 February 1968) is an Indian arms dealer and politician. He was arraigned as the main suspect in the Scorpene Submarines deal scandal, however the Delhi High Court in 13 January 2016 dismissed the probe.

== Personal life ==
Verma's father, Shrikant Verma, was a journalist before Indira Gandhi brought him into the Indian National Congress (INC) and made him a member of the 1976 Indian Parliament.

His mother, Veena Verma, served for fourteen years as a member of Parliament, and was Vice-President of the All India Mahila Congress.

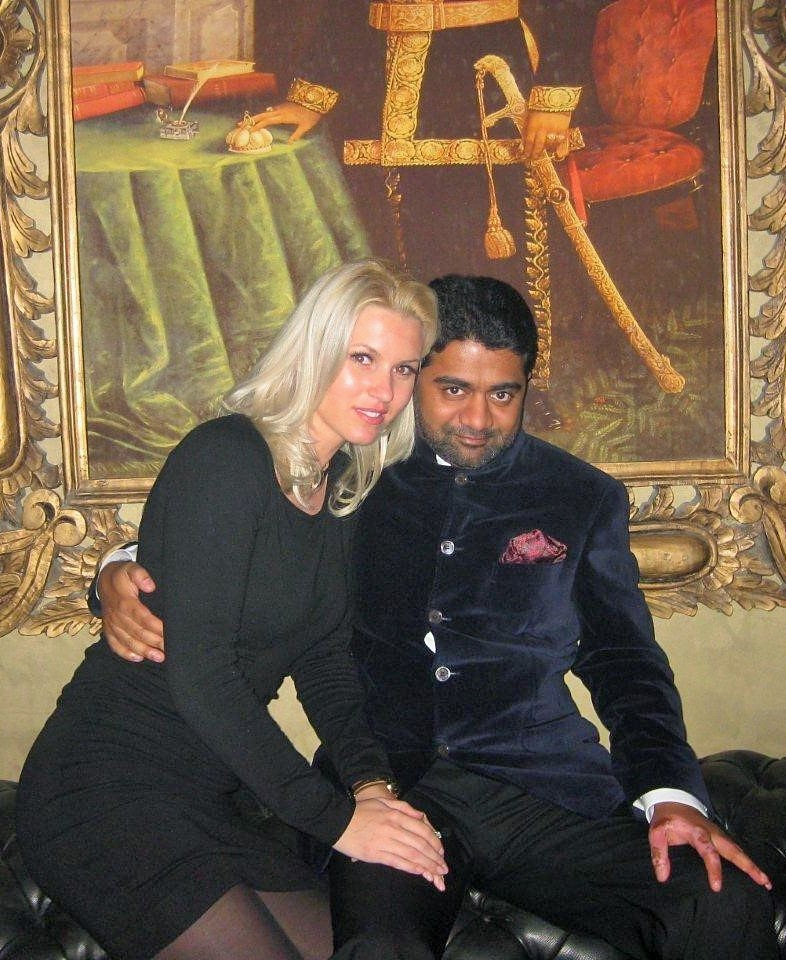
Abhishek Verma with his wife Anca Verma

In 2001, Verma was engaged to marry Evelina Papantoniou, before marrying Anca Neacsu.

== Career ==
Verma was Chairman of Atlas Interactive India Private Limited and signed an agreement with the Indian Government to run Bharat Sanchar Nigam Limited to provide the technology for 'netTV' (television through an internet connection) by 2004. In 2011 Verma took over the reins of Olialia World a multinational FMCG brand as the Chief Evangelist of the group. In 2017 Verma was awarded the contract to construct & own Maldives International airport with an investment of US$500 million, which would be known as Olialia International Airport for 50 years.

In May 2019 a controversy erupted in the Maldives when photos of Verma were published with President Mohammed Nasheed who is the Chairman of MDP Party in the Maldives. Verma threatened to sue the columnist Bushry associated with the newspaper One Online, causing an uproar in the Maldives.

Verma is the main witness in 1984 anti-Sikh riots against Congress leader Jagdish Tytler. The courts in December 2015 directed the Central Bureau of Investigation (CBI) to record Verma's testimony as witness. Due to the high threat perception, Verma was granted round the clock 'Z' category Delhi Police protection and paramilitary forces on the directions of Delhi High Court.

Verma's proximity to Varun Gandhi, scion of the Nehru–Gandhi family, was made public when explicit photos of Gandhi and Verma with European escorts were released to the news media in 2016 by social activist politician Prashant Bhushan. Gandhi and Verma denied the allegations and issued statements that the photos released by Bhushan were morphed. Bhushan's allegations of Gandhi being blackmailed by Verma were also rubbished by Gandhi.

== Politics ==
Verma was nominated to contest Lok Sabha parliamentary elections from Congress Party in 1996, which he turned down for personal reasons.

On 30 January 2025, Verma was appointed the Chief National Coordinator for NDA Alliance and Elections for Shiv Sena by Deputy Chief Minister of Maharashtra, Eknath Shinde in Mumbai. Verma has been brought in as a key strategist and tasked by the party to expand ShivSena nationally across India, under NDA (National Democratic Alliance) coalition with BJP.

Verma is active in propagating right-wing Hindu political ideology. Verma has been participating in religious events on behalf of Shiv Sena. Verma was conferred the title of Sanatan Yoddha (Sanatan Warrior) by the Chairman of Ram Janambhoomi Trust (Ayodhya) Swami Nritya Gopal Das Maharaj in Mathura in September 2025 for his contribution towards preservation of Hindutva and Sanatan Dharma in India.

Verma was also conferred the title of ‘Gau Rakshak’ (cow preservation / protector) by His Holiness Acharya Sudhanshu ji maharaj in October 2025.

As the Managing Trustee of Shrikant Verma Trust, Verma announced India’s biggest award for Hindi Literature for Rupees 2.1 million in 2025 that would be awarded annually (named after his father), the Shrikant Verma Samman, to the best writer/poet in Hindi as well as an award for journalism for Rupees five hundred thousand and for fine arts and performing arts at Rupees two hundred thousand each.

== Allegations of corruption and imprisonment ==
In 2006, Verma was accused by the opposition Bharatiya Janata Party (BJP) of receiving kickbacks amounting to around US$200 million, through a US$4.5 billion Indian military deal, as a consequence of the Indian government purchasing six Scorpène-class submarines from Thales. The BJP raised this in Parliament, pointing out his proximity to the Congress party, and alleged he had gained the agency to negotiate the contract with Thales as a result of bribing certain Congress politicians.

Verma and Thales immediately denied all the allegations, and launched a lawsuit against The Outlook Magazine, which had been the first to break the story. He also sued the former BJP Deputy Prime Minister of India, L. K. Advani, for criminal defamation; Advani had campaigned against Verma, demanding the Government charge the latter with corruption.

In 2016 the Delhi High Court exonerated Verma when the CBI published their report into the allegations: they stated that the monies received by him was not a result of the submarine sale. On 7 June 2012, CBI raided Verma's 10 premises and establishments in India after registration of cases of corruption and money laundering.

In 2013, Verma was named a suspect in the 2013 Indian helicopter bribery scandal by the Indian Government for massive bribes exceeding €50 million that were paid to Indian politicians including Sonia Gandhi as alleged by BJP leader Subramanian Swamy. Verma is suspected to have been the middleman in the chopper deal and the nexus was exposed by TimesNow TV with their global investigation however he was acquitted by the Indian Courts in April 2017.

Due to various other arms deal-related cases that Verma and his wife are alleged to have been involved in, the government attempted to freeze their secret bank accounts in Liechtenstein, which are said to hold over US$500 million; however the Liechtenstein authorities rejected the Indian government's request to open the accounts in 2015.

When Enforcement Directorate raids were carried out at Verma's residences, among the goods seized were 36 paintings, valued at over US$5 million and designer watches worth US$1 million.

In June 2012, Verma was arrested and charged with corruption and money laundering; the trial commenced in December 2015. In April 2017, a CBI special court dismissed the charges against Verma and his wife due to lack of evidence.
