= Scorpene deal scam =

2005 Indian bribery scandal by

The Scorpène deal scam was an alleged Indian bribery scandal, in which USD 1750 million (Rupees 1,100 crores) were alleged to have been paid to the Government of India’s defence procurement decision makers by Thales, a French defence and aerospace company. In 2005, the Minister of Defence, Pranab Mukherjee, approved the deal to build Scorpène-class submarines, which was worth US$3 billion (Rupees 19,000 crores) with Thales. However, in 2008, the Central Bureau of Investigation (CBI), found no evidence of corruption in the deal. Scorpène-class submarines were then built in India under a technology transfer agreement that as part of the submarine deal and are now operational with the Indian Navy.

== Allegations and investigation ==
The amount of US$175 million was allegedly channeled and paid to middleman billionaire arms dealer Abhishek Verma who is known as the Lord of War and is the prime accused in the Navy War Room spy scandal and many other defence scandals in India.

The investigation moved very slowly. In 2007, Prashant Bhushan of the Centre for Public Interest Litigation filed a petition with the Delhi High Court to investigate whether kickbacks had been paid in the Scorpène-class submarine deal. The Delhi High Court took a strong line with the investigating agency CBI, saying "We feel dissatisfied with what you've done so far. If you've tried to shield someone, then we will come down very heavily on you". French submarine manufacturer Thales refuted the charges, with its country director in India, Francois Dupont, saying, "The e-mails are forgeries and we have sued the news magazine for this." Arms dealer Abhishek Verma sued former Deputy Prime Minister of India L. K. Advani and Outlook magazine for criminal defamation in 2006 for maligning his name and launching attacks merely on account of political vendetta. In 2016, Abhishek Verma and L.K.Advani resolved their differences amicably and Verma withdrew his defamation case against Advani from Punjab and Haryana High Court.

== Result ==
In 2008, the CBI told the Delhi High Court that after investigations, it had found no evidence of payment of kickbacks in the US$6 billion deal. However the case dragged on for eight years in Delhi High Court. On 13 January 2016, the Chief Justice of Delhi High Court dismissed the PIL (Public Interest Litigation) filed by Prashant Bhushan in 2007.
