= Integrity pact =

An integrity pact is a multi-party agreement by a public body seeking to procure goods and services of significant value. As a tool for preventing corruption in public contracting, companies interested in bidding to supply the goods and services give a third party organisation, such as a civil society organisation, a role in monitoring compliance with the pact.

The agreement includes a written commitment by all parties to respect specific integrity standards during the procurement process. It typically also includes a process for reporting concerns about corruption and fair competition. Some integrity pacts also include sanctions mechanisms.

According to the European Commission, the objectives include:

- Increase transparency, accountability and good governance in public contracting
- Enhance trust in public authorities and contribute to their better reputation
- Improve competition, promote cost efficiency and savings through better procurement

Integrity pacts are promoted and supported by a German-based anti-corruption organisation, Transparency International, which first developed the concept in the 1990s.

== Background and application ==
Integrity Pacts have been applied in at least 32 countries to hundreds of procurement projects in a range of sectors including infrastructure, transport, health and defence. In India, Mexico and Pakistan, Integrity Pacts are a legal requirement for procurement above a certain value.

The European Commission launched a pilot project in 2015/2016 entitled Integrity Pacts - Civil Control Mechanism for Safeguarding EU Funds, covering 17 EU-funded projects in 11 Member States with a total value of over EUR 920 million. The pilot is coordinated by the Transparency International Secretariat, which maintains a status report on each project. The aim of the pilot is to evaluate the effectiveness of Integrity Pacts in achieving their intended objectives of safeguarding procurement projects from corruption, fraud and other irregularities, as well as draw out best practice for future implementation.

The project was launched at an international conference which was organised by the Transparency International and supported by the European Commission and held on 5 May 2015 in Brussels. A Mid-Term Learning Review published in November 2018 referred specifically to the necessity of political will and to the value of implementing Integrity Pacts early in the pre-tendering phase. The project received the European Ombudsman's Award for Good Administration 2019 in the category "Excellence in open administration". The G20 has also recommended the use of Integrity Pacts in their 2019 Compendium of Good Practices for Promoting Integrity and Transparency in Infrastructure Development.

== Costs and benefits ==
The average total cost of implementing an Integrity Pact in an infrastructure project over one year is estimated to be up to US$100,000. This figure depends on many variables including market conditions, the country in which it is implemented, the size of the project and whether Integrity Pacts are already regularly used in that context.

The development and implementation of an Integrity Pact is often funded by the contracting authority or a project investor such as an international financial institution. In the case of the EU Integrity Pacts - Civil Control Mechanism for Safeguarding EU Funds project, the European Commission has budgeted over EUR 7.2 million across the four-year pilot. In other cases, bidders must contribute to the costs of the Integrity Pact as part of the bidding requirements.

The use of Integrity Pacts is credited with achieving significant cost savings in certain projects where effective monitoring and evaluation systems have been used. For example, an Integrity Pact applied to procurement related to the Greater Karachi Water Supply Scheme in Pakistan in 2001 contributed to saving around a fifth of the total contract price. Subsequent projects implemented by the same monitor, Transparency International Pakistan, also resulted in cost savings and Integrity Pacts are now mandatory in Pakistan for all public procurement projects above a certain threshold.

Other countries with particularly successful experiences of Integrity Pacts include Mexico, where the concept is known as Testigo Social (Social Witness) and implemented by Transparencia Mexicana. This concept was first applied to the construction of the El Cajón and La Yesca dam projects in 2002 and 2006/7 and is now mandatory in procurement above a certain threshold.

There is evidence that even when an Integrity Pact "fails" to guarantee a procurement process free of corruption, it nevertheless contributes to transparency and the highlighting of fraud and other irregularities. This is the case in the Berlin Brandenburg Airport construction project, where the monitor Transparency International Germany formally withdrew in 2015 stating that "corruption has not been taken seriously". The monitor appointed to oversee an Integrity Pact for a tramline project in Riga, Delna, also publicly withdrew from the process in 2019 due to "suspicions of fraud, mismanagement and unacceptably high risks".

In January 2014, the Government of India cancelled a US$630 million deal with AgustaWestland for purchasing 12 AW 101 helicopters citing "breach of the Pre-contract Integrity Pact and the agreement by AWIL (AgustaWestland International Ltd)".
