= Pier Francesco Guarguaglini =

Italian businessman (1937–2026)

Pier Francesco Guarguaglini (25 February 1937 – 5 January 2026) was an Italian engineer, university educator and businessman. He is best known for his nine-year term (2002–2011) as chairman of Finmeccanica (from 2017 Leonardo), a partly state-owned Italian aerospace and defence conglomerate.

== Life and career ==
Guarguaglini was born in Tuscany, Italy, on 25 February 1937. He studied electrical engineering at the University of Pisa and Collegio Pacinotti of Scuola Normale Superiore di Pisa (present-day Sant'Anna School of Advanced Studies), then received his PhD from the University of Pennsylvania.

He began his career as an assistant lecturer in nuclear electronics at the University of Pisa. He later became an assistant lecturer in radar systems at the University of Rome, remaining there for 15 years. He also worked for nearly 20 years at Italian electronics firm Selenia in various managerial positions.

His various industry positions include general manager, and later chief executive officer, of Officine Galileo (1984–94); a managing director of Oto Melara and Breda Meccanica Bresciana (1994–96); head of Finmeccanica Defence Consortium (1996–99); chairman of the board of directors of Alenia Marconi Systems (1998–2000); chief executive officer of Fincantiere SPA and Cantieri Navali Italiani (Italy's largest shipbuilding consortium)(1999–2002).

In 2002, Guarguaglini returned to Finmeccanica, being named to the posts of chief executive officer and president on 24 April.

While at Finmeccanica, he also remained busy elsewhere. He was an independent lecturer at the University of Rome and was named an independent director of Eutelsat Communications on 26 July 2007. He sat on the councils of Confindustria, and AECMA (European Association of Aerospace Industries, later changed to AeroSpace and Defence Industries Association of Europe). He was a member of IEEE (Institute of Electrical and Electronics Engineers), and was a member of the IEEE board representing the United States and Italy.

Gargauglini received an honorary doctorate from Heriot-Watt University in 2010.

Gargauglini died on 5 January 2026, at the age of 88.

== Departure from Finmeccanica ==
Guarguaglini had been nominated to head the Finmeccanica group by the Italian Finance Ministry, which holds some 30 per cent of the company's stock. A member of the Italia group of the Trilateral Commission, he was considered extremely successful in restoring the company's position in the worldwide industry - under his direction, Finmeccanica gained full control of European helicopter company AgustaWestland in 2004, and used that control to win the competition to provide helicopter transportation for the President of the United States in 2005. Partly in recognition of this success, US industry magazine Aviation Week & Space Technology named him its 2005 Person Of The Year. He gained a greater foothold in the US aviation electronics market by purchasing the US electronics fabricator DRS Technologies Inc. in 2008.

By 2009, Italian investigators were looking into bribery charges that had been levelled at several Italian companies. They tried to determine whether executives at one of Finmeccanica's divisions, Selex Sistemi Integrati, had inflated the value of contracts with an air traffic manager, and then used the resulting funds to bribe various politicians. That division was managed by Guarguaglini's wife, Marina Grossi. By early 2011 the government (as represented by Prime Minister Mario Monti) was convinced that a top-to-bottom shakeout of Finmeccanica management was necessary, and in April 2011, they brought in Giuseppe Orsi (born 1945) to replace Guarguaglini as chief executive officer. Guarguaglini retained responsibility for company strategy, acquisitions, asset sales, and government relations.

The dual-manager situation proved difficult, however, and on 1 December 2011, Guarguaglini held a showdown with the board of directors in an attempt to more clearly define the division of responsibilities between the two managers. Unable to achieve his desired goal, he submitted his resignation effective immediately. It was accepted, and he received a 4.5 million-euro payout on his remaining contract, with another 1.5 million-euro payment at the end of a one-year non-compete agreement. In June 2014, Guarguaglini was placed under house arrest in connection with the Sistri bribery probe.
