= Sudhanshu Maharaj =

Indian preacher (born 1955)

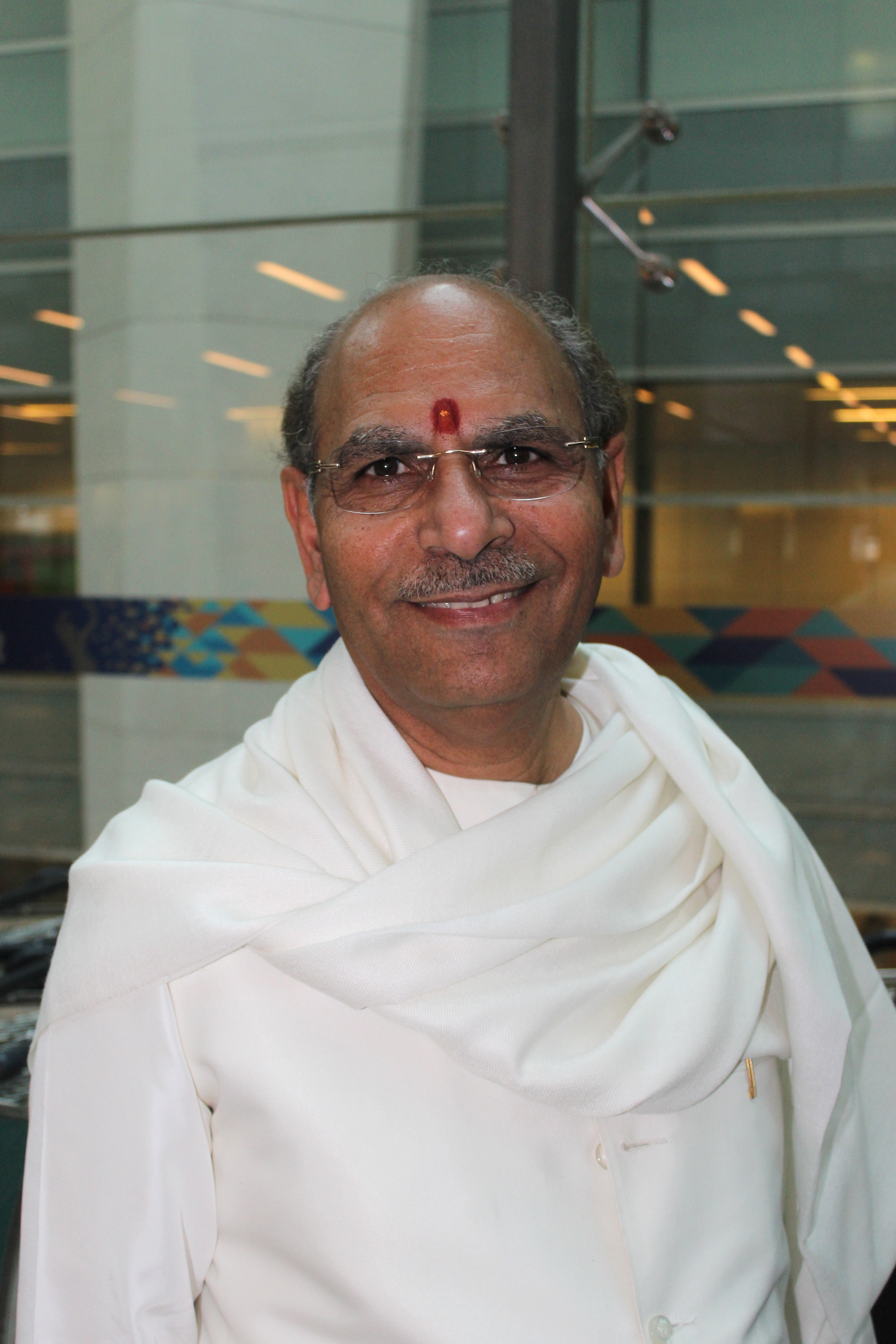
- Sudhanshu Maharaj at New Delhi Airport-2018

Personal life
- Born: Sudhanshu Maharaj; May 2, 1955 (age 71) Haripur, Saharanpur, Uttar Pradesh
- Children: 2
- Citizenship: Indian
- Occupation: Spiritual leader
- Website: www.sudhanshujimaharaj.net

Religious life
- Religion: Hinduism
- Founder of: Vishwa Jagriti Mission (VJM)

Acharya Sudhanshu Maharaj (born 2 May 1955 ) is an Indian spiritual leader, preacher and the founder of Vishwa Jagriti Mission (VJM). According to the organization, he has an estimated following of around 10 million devotees worldwide. The organization operates several ashrams across India and has international presence in countries including Hong Kong, Singapore, Indonesia, and the United States.

== Biography ==
Sudhanshu Ji Maharaj was born on 2 May 1955 in Haripur, near Usand, in the Saharanpur district of Uttar Pradesh, India. The region is located between the Ganga and Yamuna rivers in the sub-Himalayan Shivalik range in northern India. He pursued his education through various stages, beginning with school, followed by time spent in a Gurukul, and later attending university. At the age of 20, Sudhanshu Ji Maharaj studied under Professor Nandkishore, a philosopher in Haridwar. After completing his university education at the age of 22, he traveled across India, visiting the four major religious pilgrimage sites and numerous places of worship. Sudhanshu Ji Maharaj practiced meditation under the guidance of Yogi Shri Sadanandji Maharaj. On the direction of his guru, he began delivering discourses on texts such as the Vedas, Shastras, Upanishads, the Gita, and the Ramayana.

== Vishwa Jagriti Mission ==
The Vishwa Jagriti Mission was established on 24 March 1991 by Sudhanshu Ji Maharaj in Delhi. The organization conducts activities related to spirituality, education, healthcare, social welfare and humanitarian work, including operating hospitals, orphanages, and disaster relief initiatives. According to the organization, It has over 80 branches across India and internationally and runs more than four educational institutions.

It operates several ashrams in India and has international presence in countries such as Hong Kong, Singapore, Indonesia, and the United States. It operates Maharishi Vedvyas Gurukul Vidyapeeths in Kanpur, Nagpur, and Delhi, and a Vedvyas Updeshak Mahavidyalaya in New Delhi. It also runs 7 (cow shelters) and 2 hospitals.

=== Sanatan Sanskriti Jagran Abhiyan ===
Under the Vishwa Jagriti Mission, Sudhanshu Ji Maharaj launched the Sanatan Sanskriti Jagran Abhiyan, a programme described by the organization as promoting aspects of Sanatan Dharma and related cultural values. According to organizational statements, the initiative includes proposals to expand 10 Gurukul-based educational institutions and establish 108 Bal Sanskar Kendras focused on value-based education for children.

=== Child development initiatives ===
The Vishwa Jagriti Mission operates educational and welfare initiatives aimed at children from economically disadvantaged backgrounds. These include Gyandeep Vidyalaya in Faridabad and Devdoot Balashram, an orphanage in Surat. In 2001, VJM filed a petition seeking a ban on ragging in educational institutions, as part of wider legal and institutional efforts addressing the issue. Sudhanshu Ji Maharaj has spoken publicly against ragging, describing it as a form of student harassment. He has also participated in public yoga and meditation programmes focused on stress management and well-being.

=== Elder care ===
The Vishwa Jagriti Mission operates an elder care facility at Anand Dham Ashram, providing residential accommodation for senior citizens. According to media reports, residents follow a structured daily routine that includes communal activities.

=== Social work and disaster response ===
The organization has been involved in social welfare activities, including participation in disaster relief efforts and community programmes related to education and health, as reported by the Free Press Journal. It also runs the initiatives focused on the education and empowerment of women and girls.

== Works and publications ==
Sudhanshu Ji Maharaj has authored books and recorded discourses in Hindi and English focusing on religious and spiritual themes. His published work includes commentaries on Hindu scriptures such as the Bhagavad Gita, as well as periodicals issued by the Vishwa Jagriti Mission. Under his leadership, the Vishwa Jagriti Mission publishes periodicals including Jeevan Sanchetna, a monthly magazine, and Dharmadoot, a monthly newspaper. The organization has also published books based on his philosophical views, addressing topics such as spirituality, meditation, and cultural values.

== Philosophy ==
Sudhanshu Ji's teachings are rooted in Sanatan philosophy and draw upon Hindu scriptures including the Vedas, Upanishads, and Bhagavad Gita. His discourses have emphasized meditation, self-discipline, karma yoga, service, and contentment, with a focus on applying spiritual principles to everyday life. According to Dainik Bhaskar, he has discussed the effects of comparison, jealousy, and the pursuit of external validation on individual well-being, describing them as obstacles to inner contentment and self-awareness. He has also associated his teachings with karma yoga, emphasizing action, prayer, and divine grace as elements of spiritual practice. His philosophy has been linked to the principles of seva (service), simran (remembrance of the divine), swadhyaya (self-study), satsang (spiritual fellowship), sadhana (spiritual practice), samarpan (surrender), and santosh (contentment). He has additionally promoted the concept of "Nar Seva, Narayan Seva", which interprets service to humanity as service to God.

== Awards ==
- 2018: Received the Suryadatta National Award 2018.
