= Anca Verma =

Romanian supermodel

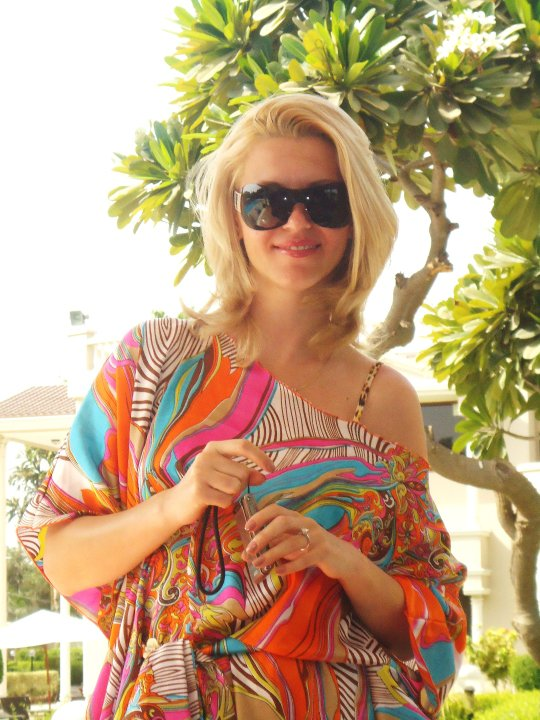
- Anca Verma in 2010
- Born: Anca Maria Neacșu; 8 August 1987 (age 39); Galați, Romania
- Education: University of Galați
- Occupations: Industrialist and Philanthropist
- Organization: Shrikant Verma Trust
- Known for: Arms dealer and former model
- Height: 179 cm (5 ft 10 in)
- Spouse: Abhishek Verma (m. 2006)
- Children: 2
- Website: thevermafamily.org

Anca Verma (née Neacșu; born 8 August 1987) is a former Romanian model. She is married to Abhishek Verma and is known for being arrested along with her husband for an alleged corruption and money laundering case in New Delhi, India.

In 2017 Verma was discharged in two money laundering and corruption cases by the CBI courts.

== Career ==
After leaving modelling, she joined Atlas Telecom Network Romania, a mobile service provider.

Verma was the Chairperson of Olialia World a fast moving consumer goods company.

Verma is involved in philanthropic activities in India and Romania.

== Arrest and imprisonment ==
Verma and her husband have been accused of corruption and money laundering and were arrested by the CBI for supposedly bribing Indian defense officials to secure billion-dollar weapons contracts. On 8 June 2012, they were both imprisoned in Tihar Jail, Delhi. Verma was the inspiration for author Sunetra Choudhury who wrote a book Prison Tales published by Roli Books and featured Verma as the VIP inmate who wore 24K gold plated Louis Vuitton high heel shoes in prison.

Verma's bail plea was rejected by the Delhi High Court in March 2015, but on 20 May 2016 the court granted her bail after four years in prison. According to Indian investigators, their attempts to freeze Verma's offshore bank accounts in the tax haven of Principality of Liechtenstein had been unsuccessful as the Liechtenstein government rejected the request from Enforcement Directorate India, calling it a 'fishing expedition' as no charges had been brought forward that could constitute a criminal offence in Liechtenstein or the European Union.

In April 2017, Verma was exonerated by a special court of CBI in New Delhi from the charges of corruption and money laundering and the two cases against Verma were dismissed.
