= Vinod Goenka =

Indian real-estate developer (born 1959)

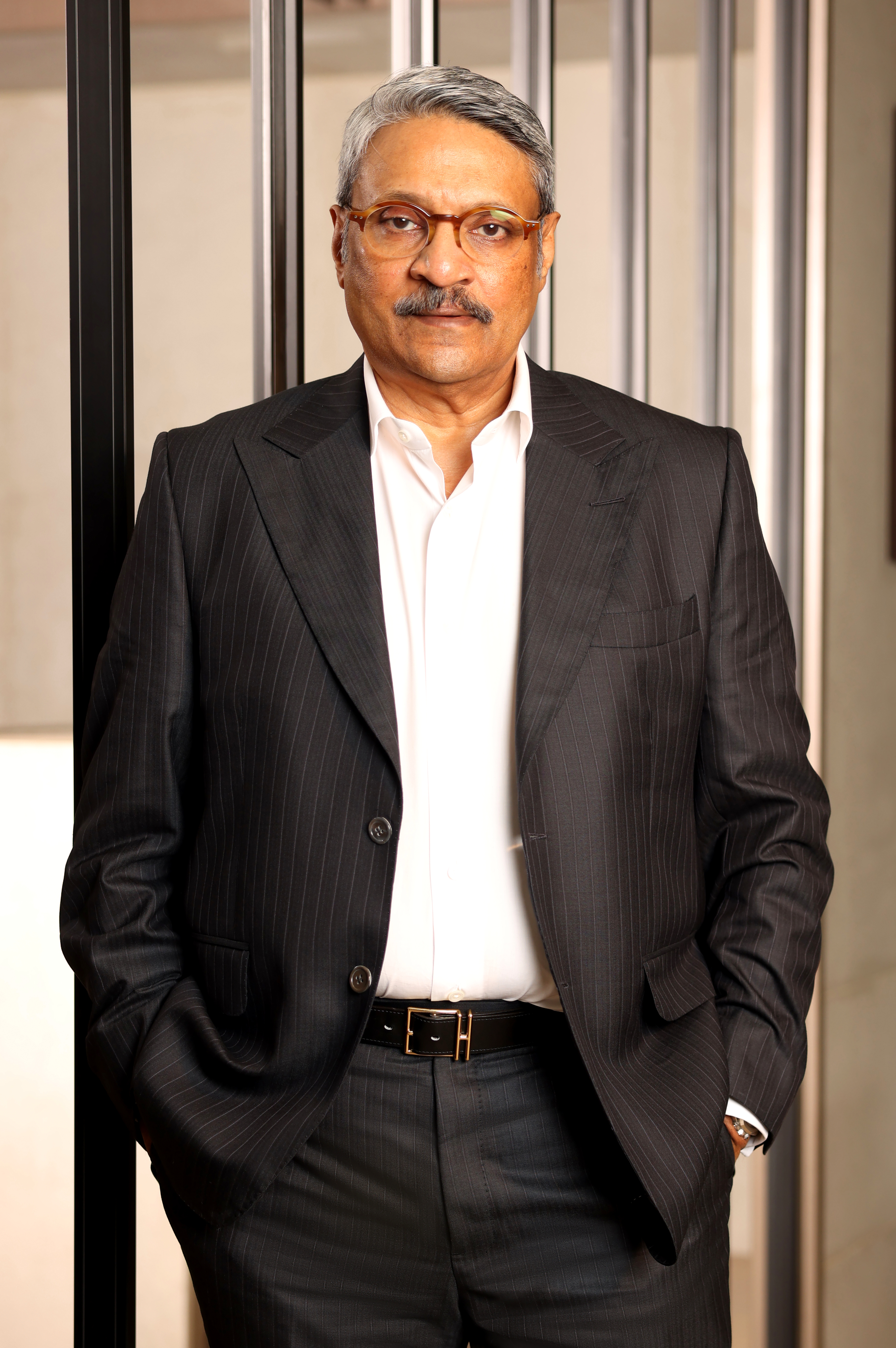
- Vinod Goenka in 2024
- Born: July 2, 1959 (age 67)
- Education: Jamnabai Narsee School; Campion School, Mumbai
- Occupations: Real estate developer, Industrialist
- Title: Chairman and managing director, Valor Estate (Formerly DB Group); Founder, Goenka & Associates Educational Trust
- Spouse: Aseela Goenka
- Children: 2

Vinod Goenka (born 2 July 1959) is an Indian real-estate developer and billionaire. He is Chairman and Managing Director of Valor Estate (formerly DB Realty Limited), a real estate development company headquartered in Mumbai, India.

In 2010, his net worth was estimated at US$1.18 billion.

== Early life and education ==
Goenka was born in 1959 in Kolkata. When he was 6 years old, his family moved to Mumbai. He first attended Green Lawns High School, then Jamnabai Narsee School, and eventually finished his schooling at Campion School, Mumbai. He competed in Track and Field and narrowly missed qualifying for the Asian Games. An injury later led him to shift focus away from sports.

== Career ==
At just 19 years old, he began working in his father's business in the 1980s. In the early 1980s, Goenka started his real estate business with Conwood Constructions and launched projects such as Gokuldham and Yashodham in Goregaon, Mahavir Nagar in Kandivli, Vasant Vihar in Thane and Shristi in Mira Road. In 1994, he diversified his business by venturing into the dairy industry in partnership with the US-based Schreiber Foods, establishing an integrated dairy plant in Baramati. By 2006, he partnered with Shahid Balwa, another Mumbai-based realtor in a 50:50 collaboration to develop Le Méridien Mumbai (now Hilton International Airport Hotel). This partnership resulted in the creation of the DB group. In a few years, the company reported 21 million sq ft under construction and 40 million sq ft in planned projects.

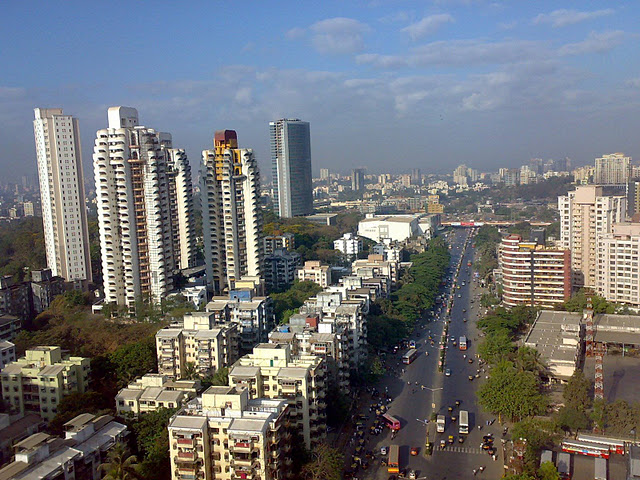
Skyline view of Gokuldham in Goregaon in 2009

Goenka, known for cluster development in Mumbai and its suburbs, focuses on redeveloping aging buildings and converting them into affordable housing while adhering to sustainable urban growth and town planning goals. From about 2015, he began pursuing joint ventures through Valor Estate, giving land to partner developers who then developed the projects. It partners included Prestige Group,Godrej Properties, L&T Realty, Rustomjee and Lodha Group. In 2020, the Government of Maharashtra established a steering committee comprising cabinet ministers, senior officials, and industry leaders, including developers like Goenka to address real estate challenges and support initiatives like these.

As of January 2025, Goenka is involved in redevelopment projects in and around Mumbai, including slums, cooperative societies, and Maharashtra Housing and Area Development Authority-owned properties. Since beginning his work in slum redevelopment in 1995, he has been part of projects totaling over 1 million square feet. His company holds over 500 acres in Mumbai and is currently involved in Ten BKC, a five-acre redevelopment project near Bandra Kurla Complex, developed in collaboration with Adani GoodHomes.

== Philanthropy ==
Vinod Goenka heads Goenka & Associates Educational Trust (GAET), which operates eight schools in Mumbai and Thane and is developing Goa’s first International Baccalaureate school. Collectively, these schools have over 22,000 students enrolled.

== Controversies ==
Goenka was arrested on 20 April 2011 for his alleged involvement in the 2G spectrum case. During his imprisonment, he temporarily stepped down from his roles in the companies he was associated with. After spending over seven months in custody, Goenka was granted bail by the Supreme Court of India on 23 November 2011. In 2013, UAE telecommunications operator Etisalat initiated legal proceedings against its Indian partners, Goenka and Shahid Balwa, after the Supreme Court canceled the latter's 2G licenses. On 21 December 2017, Goenka and all 18 other accused persons in the 2G spectrum case were acquitted of all charges levied against them.

Goenka was linked to a Yes Bank-Dewan Housing Finance Corporation fraud case over a ₹350 crore loan his firm, Neelkamal Realtors, received from Yes Bank between 2013 and 2016, which the Central Blook-out Investigation alleged was diverted as part of a ₹4,733 crore siphoning scheme involving DHFL. Despite raids in 2022 and a chargesheet in 2024, a CBI court in March 2025 dropped the charges against Goenka, finding that the loan had been settled with Piramal Capital and Housing Finance Limited, which had acquired DHFL, before the chargesheet was filed and that there was no evidence of fraud, thereby clearing him of liability. This repayment was a key factor in the court's decision to dismiss the allegations against him. In distinct rulings, the court also instructed the CBI to withdraw the look out circular issued against Goenka.

In July 2026, the Bombay High Court quashed the Enforcement Directorate’s Prevention of Money Laundering Act, 2002 proceedings against Goenka and DB Realty Limited (now Valor Estate) in a case linked to alleged corruption involving former Maharashtra Deputy Chief Minister Chhagan Bhujbal. The ED had alleged that a ₹5 crore advance paid by DB Realty to Parvesh Construction Pvt. Ltd. for a proposed land project (later refunded) was a sham transaction involving proceeds of crime from irregularities in public works contracts; however, Justice Ashwin Bhobe held that the case could not be sustained after the special court discharged Parvesh Construction on the finding that no scheduled offence or proceeds of crime existed, and therefore set aside the special court’s 2016 order issuing process and 2019 order rejecting their discharge applications.

== Personal life ==
Goenka resides in Mumbai. He is married to Aseela Goenka and has two children, a son and a daughter.
