= Essar leaks =

Data breach of Essar Group user database in 2015

The Essar leaks include e-mails, office memos, telephone conversations and other records allegedly leaked from the systems of the Indian business conglomerate Essar Group. The leaked records allegedly contain evidence of politician-corporate nexus in India, and show how business interests unfairly manipulate Indian government and judiciary.

In 2015, an unnamed whistleblower leaked a set of internal e-mails and memos from the Essar Group, alleging that the conglomerate had granted favours to several politicians, bureaucrats and journalists. Essar denied the allegations, terming the alleged favours as "common courtesies" that are legally justifiable. Essar also claimed that some of the leaked material was fabricated, and was being used to blackmail them.

In May 2016, lawyer Suren Uppal reported the existence of a new set of secretly recorded conversations to the Prime Minister. The conversations involve influential politicians, bureaucrats, businesspeople, bankers, and other VIPs. Uppal claimed to have received these tapes from the former Essar employee Albasit Khan, and alleged that the Essar officials illegally tapped these conversations during the 2000s. In June 2016, after the Outlook magazine made Uppal's claims public, Khan denied Essar's role in tapping the conversations. He acknowledged the existence of the tapes, but stated he had received these tapes from the now-deceased Mumbai Police officer Vijay Salaskar, a claim denied by Mumbai Police. According to Khan, the ultimate source and authenticity of the tapes are unknown. He admitted to having informed Uppal about the tapes, but accused Uppal of fabricating the Essar link to extort money from the business. Uppal denied the allegations, and promised to release the tapes to the Supreme Court of India. Essar completely denied the story, accusing Suren Uppal of being an extortionist.

== Background ==
=== 2015 leak: E-mails and memos ===
In 2015, a whistleblower approached lawyer-activist Prashant Bhushan, and leaked a set of internal e-mails and memos from Essar Group. The material indicated that Essar Group had granted favours to several politicians, bureaucrats and journalists. This led to allegations that Essar had been trying to unfairly influence public policy and opinion. Bhushan's Centre for Public Interest Litigation (CPIL) filed a PIL before the Supreme Court of India, requesting an investigation into these allegations. The Essar Group filed an affidavit seeking dismissal of the PIL, calling the favours as legally justifiable "common courtesies".

=== 2016 leak: Phone tapping ===
On 1 June 2016, the Delhi-based lawyer Suren Uppal submitted a 29-page complaint to Prime Minister Narendra Modi alleging that Essar had tapped VIP conversations during 2000s. According to Uppal, the Essar Group had carried out the surveillance on the Prime Minister's Office (starting with A. B. Vajpayee), the cabinet ministers, government bureaucrats and rival businesspeople.

According to Uppal, the tapping was done under the supervision of Albasit Khan (or Basit Khan), a former head of security and vigilance at Essar Group. Uppal claims to be Khan's former legal representative, and has alleged that Khan was forced to resign from Essar in 2011, after being accused of keeping back some of the recorded conversations. He has alleged that "special mobile SIM cards or the mobile interceptor mobile SIM cards" were used to tap the conversations. Until 2005, the surveillance was carried out over the BPL Mobile network, which had been under Essar's control. The network was also used by Essar's rival Reliance Industries Limited (RIL), which allowed Essar to tap their conversations. However, RIL moved out of this network after 2005. After that, Essar allegedly used Hutchison network for the tapping.

In June 2016, the Outlook magazine published a report on these tapped conversations. Subsequently, Albasit Khan told the media that Essar had not recorded these conversations, and stated that their source and authenticity were unknown. Khan acknowledged the existence of tapes containing the conversations, but stated that the Mumbai Police officer Vijay Salaskar had given these tapes to him for "safekeeping" in 2005. Mumbai Police denied this, and Outlook doubted Khan's claim, pointing out that the tapes include conversations from as late as 2011. Khan admitted that had had met Uppal in January 2016, and had informed him about the tapes. But he denied hiring Uppal as his lawyer. Khan alleged Uppal of fabricating the Essar link to extort money from the business. In response, Uppal claimed that he and Khan had been working to "expose" the tapping, but Khan backed out under Essar Group's influence. He promised to hand over the alleged tapes to the Supreme Court as part of a Public Interest Litigation (PIL).

Essar is said to have recorded the conversations of following people:

Businesspeople
- Anil Ambani, Reliance Anil Dhirubhai Ambani Group (ADAG) chairman
- Mukesh Ambani, Reliance Industries Limited (RIL) chairman
- Tina Ambani, wife of Anil Ambani
- Several officials of RIL and ADAG
- Subroto Roy, Sahara Group chief

Bankers

- P. P. Vora, former chairman of IDBI Bank
- K. V. Kamath, former CEO and MD of ICICI Bank
- Lalita Gupte, former Joint MD of ICICI Bank

Ministers

- Ram Naik, Bharatiya Janata Party (BJP)
- Suresh Prabhu, BJP
- Praful Patel, Nationalist Congress Party
- Pramod Mahajan, BJP

Members of Parliament (MP)

- Amar Singh, Samajwadi Party
- Kunwar Akhilesh Singh, formerly Samata Party
- Kirit Somaiya, BJP
- Jaswant Singh, BJP
- Piyush Goel
- Sudhanshu Mittal

Bureaucrats

- Brajesh Mishra, National Security Advisor during NDA government
- N. K. Singh, former PMO official during NDA government; later became a JD (U) MP, and now a BJP member
- Rajiv Mehrishi, home secretary in current NDA government

Others

- Mulayam Singh Yadav, Samajwadi Party chief
- Amitabh Bachchan, actor

== Content of the leaks ==
The Essar leaks allegedly show that the businesses unfairly influenced the Indian government and judiciary during both UPA and NDA tenures. The leaks include the following:

- A November 2002 conversation between politicians Amar Singh and Kunwar Akhilesh Singh reveals how Amar Singh lobbied in favour of Reliance Petroleum as a member of the Joint Parliamentary Committee.
- A December 2002 conversation between RIL executives Mukesh Ambani and Satish Seth discusses how the Supreme Court was "managed" through minister Pramod Mahajan.
- In another conversation, Mukesh Ambani and Satish Seth discuss how to break the Cellular Operators Association of India by paying millions to MP Rajeev Chandrasekhar and the BPL Mobile founder.
- In a June 2009 memo, senior executive Sunil Bajaj suggested giving 200 high-end cell phones to senior politicians and bureaucrats of the new UPA government, in order to "invest on right people at the right places for reaping long-term benefits". He stated that Airtel and Reliance were already "experiencing the benefits" of this strategy.
- In another 2009 e-mail, Sunil Bajaj suggested earmarking at least 200 recruitment slots for job referrals from powerful politicians and bureaucrats. He argued that the recommended candidates were often "highly qualified", so the company would not have a problem hiring them.
- Later e-mails from 2012 and 2013 show that Essar hired at least 60 people recommended by VIPs, which included:
  - Beni Prasad Verma, Indian National Congress (INC)
  - Digvijaya Singh, INC
  - Prabhat Jha, BJP
  - Mohan Prakash, INC general secretary
  - Motilal Vora, INC
  - Sanjeev Kumar, private secretary to the contemporary INC Minister for Petroleum & Natural Gas
  - Sriprakash Jaiswal, INC
  - Varun Gandhi, BJP
  - Yashbant Narayan Singh Laguri, Biju Janata Dal
- In one e-mail, Essar's corporate communications executive stated that she had "coordinated" a story about Essar's involvement in the 2G spectrum case, in the magazines Tehelka and Business Today. Prashant Bhushan identified the Tehelka story as Madness in CBI's method, written by the journalist Ashish Khetan (now an Aam Aadmi Party MLA). In this article, Khetan criticized the Central Bureau of Investigation for unfairly targeting Essar in the scam investigation. The article was published in December 2011, a month after Essar paid Tehelka ₹ 30 million as sponsorship amount for the magazine's Think Fest event.
- A set of e-mails reveal that the Steel ministry's joint secretary Syedain Abbasi was granted accommodation at Essar's guest house in Delhi, although he was eligible for government-granted accommodation. In a 2013 email, the Essar executive Rajamani Krishnamurti describes Abbasi as "a very important person" who was handling the "majority of Essar’s issues". The e-mail reveals that Abbasi had advised Essar to oppose a particular government proposal through industry bodies such as ASSOCHAM, CII, and FICCI.
- An e-mail sent by Sunil Bajaj before the Diwali festival of 2013 suggested distributing gifts "to person in the middle and the lower ranks in various ministries, who are very vital in sustenance and procurement of important information and documents." The e-mail indicate that the Essar officials had access to confidential government communication from multiple ministries, including Coal, Environment, Finance, Petroleum, Railways, Shipping and Steel. The Essar officials were in close contact with the Petroleum Minister Veerappa Moily, and had access to the 2012-13 budget proposals for his Ministry.
- E-mail correspondence between Essar executives shows that BJP leader Nitin Gadkari and his family enjoyed a 2-night stay on an Essar luxury yacht in French Riviera during 7–9 July 2013. Essar also arranged their stay on the Sunrays yacht for a day, including a helicopter trip to and from the Nice airport.
- Essar's internal records show that the company executives regularly arranged cabs for some Delhi-based journalists. These journalists included Anupama Airy (Hindustan Times), Meetu Jain (CNN-IBN), and Sandeep Bamzai (Mail Today).

== Reactions ==
=== Essar Group ===
In the 2015 affidavit seeking dismissal of CPIL's request for investigation, the Essar Group stated that they had not derived any benefits from the alleged favours. The affidavit stated that there was no evidence of any criminal offence by Essar Group, and the alleged favours "common courtesies extended by corporate houses".

Essar filed a police complaint for data theft, and threatened legal action against media outlets that publish "any allegations based on any email stolen from the system":

In the last few weeks we have received anonymous phone calls from people purported to have mail stolen from our systems and on which basis there have been some demands for money at the threat of publishing prejudicial material. It is curious that some of the queries reflect the kind of material on which we were sought to be blackmailed. It is apparent that some of the material is fabricated and some of the allegations are conclusions and inferences being drawn from email stolen from our computers.

— Essar Group press statement, 2015

When The Caravan published a cover story critical of the company, the Essar group filed a ₹ 2500 million defamation suit against the magazine.

Essar also questioned the authenticity of the leaked e-mails, calling them "unverified" and "pure hearsay". It stated that the company had not recruited people based solely on VIP recommendations, calling such recommendations legal and proper in Indian context.

Essar accused CPIL of launching a smear campaign against them to seek publicity.

=== People named in the leaks ===
BJP leader Nitin Gadkari denied extending any favours to the Essar Group, while commenting on his Essar-sponsored yacht stays. He stated that he was not a minister or the BJP President at the time, and paid for his family's Norway vacation using his own money. When Ruias (Essar owners) learned that he was visiting Europe, they invited him to their yacht as a family friend.

Sriprakash Jaiswal and Digvijaya Singh defended themselves stating they regularly make referrals to companies, to help unemployed people. Varun Gandhi stated that his office regularly gave letters of recommendations to educated unemployed youth after "satisfying their bonafide credentials."

Journalists Anupama Airy and Sandeep Bamzai resigned after being named among those for whom Essar had arranged cabs. Airy stated that she had requested a cab from Essar "as help from a friend", and not as a journalist. She also expressed displeasure at being singled out, stating that other journalists at Hindustan Times had sought such help from businesses in the past. Bamzai denied publishing any biased news to favour Essar Group, and stated that asking them for a cab was simply "a stupid mistake". Meetu Jain had asked Essar for a cab in 2012, when she was working with CNN-IBN. At the time her name was released, she was working as a Deputy News Editor at Times Now, which initiated an internal inquiry against her.

=== Others ===
The Aam Aadmi Party and Indian National Congress demanded that the alleged tapes be made public.

The Prime Minister Narendra Modi ordered the Home Ministry to conduct an inquiry, and submit a detailed report.

== See also ==
- Radia tapes controversy
