= J. Gopikrishnan =

Indian journalist

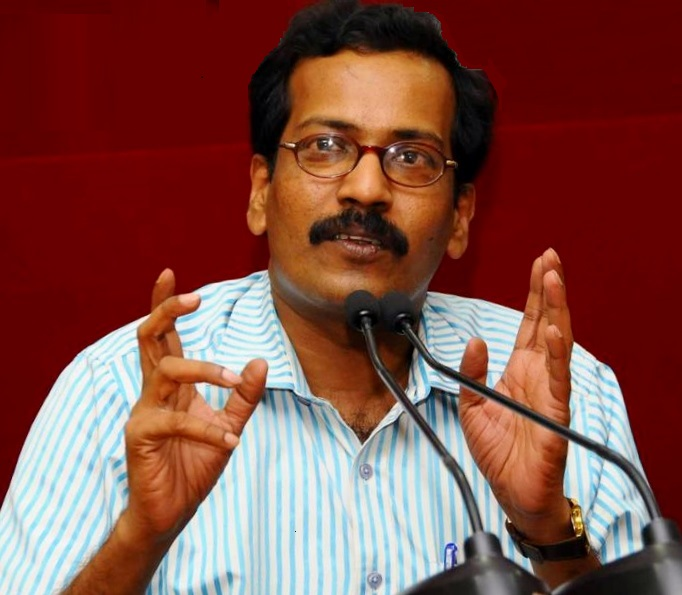

J. Gopikrishnan is an Indian journalist who wrote a series of reports, exposing the 2G case. He was awarded the Ramnath Goenka Journalist of the Year Award for print in 2009.

Administration, Gopikrishnan began his career in 1994 as Sub-Broker in Stock Exchanges in Kerala, switching over to the media field in late 1995 as a stringer at Doordarshan’s Thiruvananthapuram station. He was the television producer of several documentaries for Doorsharshan and Asianet TV channels. He obtained a Post Graduate Diploma in Journalism from the Institute of Journalism, Press Club, Thiruvananthapuram in 1999. He worked with several media organisations in Kerala before moving to Delhi and joining The Pioneer in 2008. He also writes columns for several other Malayalam newspapers.

== Career ==
His first report on the 2G case appeared in The Pioneer on 11 December 2008, exposing the hidden list of companies floated by the relatives of then telecom minister A. Raja. He had continuously written series of reports on various aspects of 2G case and Aircel-Maxis Scam and other related reports on the violations of the telecom scandal and the politico- corporate players involved in it for three years. The Pioneer had published more than 200 reports on the telecom scandal which shook the Indian government led by the Congress party and was pivotal to their election defeat in 2014. Reports included the midnight letters between then Prime Minister Manmohan Singh and Telecom minister A.Raja, an expose of the phone tapping of lobbyist Niira Radia, murky activities in BSNL’s WiMax franchisee allotments, hidden minutes of the meetings between then Finance Minister P Chidambaram and Telecom Minister A.Raja and violations in FIPB approvals of the Aircel-Maxis scam by former Finance Minister P Chidambaram.

In addition to the Ramnath Goenka award for the 2009 Journalist of the Year (awarded in January 2012), Gopikrishnan also received the CNN-IBN television channel’s ‘Indian of the Year’ (Special category) in December 2010 and the Rajasthan Patrika’s KC Kulish International Award for Excellence in Journalism 2010 (awarded in March 2014). He also presented a paper on ‘Telecom scandal of India" during SKUP, an international journalist’s conference in Norway in March 2012.

The National Herald scam involving Congress President Sonia Gandhi and Vice President Rahul Gandhi was first reported by Gopikrishnan in The Pioneer on 9 October 2012. He is also a witness in the case filed by BJP leader Subramanian Swamy before the Court of Metropolitan Magistrate, New Delhi.

== Anti-Corruption Movement ==
J. Gopikrishnan was actively involved in the anti-corruption movements in India starting from late 2010, when the 2G case hit the headlines following the resignation and arrest of then Telecom Minister A. Raja. He was a complainant to CBI and CAG from 2009 regarding the ramification of the scam demanding probe on telecom scandal. He deposed before Public Accounts Committee (PAC) of Parliament in March 2011 on the telecom scandal and Niira Radia tapes.

He was an active member of the Action Committee Against Corruption in India (ACACI), headed by BJP leader Subramanian Swamy and the Campaign for Judicial Accountability and Reform (CJAR) headed by lawyer Prashant Bhushan. He associated with Subramanian Swamy and Prashant Bhushan in their legal cases on the telecom scandal and other major corruption cases. Gopikrishnan has participated in seminars in India and abroad and made speeches on media ethics and corporatisation of the media. He is a regular speaker in several media institutes.
