= Ramesh Chandra =

Ramesh Chandra may refer to:

- Ramesh Chandra (entrepreneur) the founder of Indian Real estate company Unitech.
- Ramesh Chandra (singer) an Indian playback singer who works predominantly in the Kannada film industry.
- Ramesh Gautam an Indian politician
