= Bhubaneswar 1 =

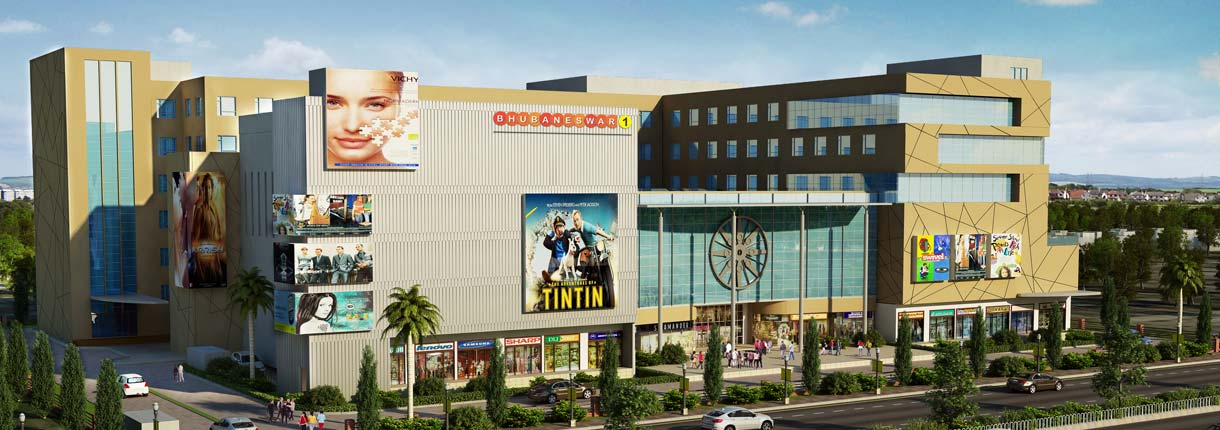
- Bhubaneswar 1
- Location: Bhubaneswar, Odisha, India
- Coordinates: 20.314885°N 85.827943°E
- Opened: 2020
- Developer: Unitech Group
- Num. of stores: 200+
- Num. of anchor tenants: 3
- Floor area: 350,000 sq ft (33,000 m^{2})
- Floors: G+4
- Parking: 2 Level Basement
- Website: Bhubaneswar 1 - Unitech

Bhubaneswar 1 is an upcoming shopping mall located in Bhubaneswar, Odisha, India. Located at Mouza-Gadakana, it is going to be one of the largest malls in Bhubaneswar. The mall will be having a total floor space of 350,000 sq ft (33,000 m^{2}) spread over five floors designed by the Unitech Group. It contains more than 200 outlets, offices, including food courts, restaurants, family entertainment zones, a multiplex and a multi level parking. The mall is yet to be inaugurated and all constructions are currently stalled due to a pending lawsuit in the Orissa High Court.
