= Ramesh Chandra (entrepreneur) =

Indian businessman

- Born: 1939 (age 86–87)
- Education: IIT Kharagpur; University of Southampton
- Known for: Founder of Unitech
- Criminal status: Jailed in 2016 for Cheating Arrested by Central Bureau of Investigation
- Spouse: Dr. Pushpa Chandra
- Children: 2

Ramesh Chandra (born 1939) is the founder of Indian Real estate company Unitech.

== Early life and education ==
Ramesh Chandra was born in 1941 to a banker, and spent his formative years in Farrukhabad, a town in Uttar Pradesh. After finishing his schooling there, he joined IIT Kharagpur, where he studied structural engineering.

Logo of Unitech Group.

== Career ==
After completing a short stint at the Bridge and Roof Company in Kolkata post his graduation, he left to major in Structural Engineering at the University of Southampton in England. However, along with four of his friends, he started the United Technical Consultant Private Ltd., primarily a soil investigation company, in Delhi. He used to have a net worth of over $11 billion at his peak in 2007 but fell into trouble after it got embroiled in a telecom corruption scandal.

He moved into real estate and civil engineering in 1985 to build middle-class homes and completed many prestigious projects in Gurgaon, UP, and Libya, among other Middle Eastern countries. His publicly traded company, the Unitech Group The company is now largely under the management of two sons — Ajay Chandra and Sanjay Chandra with the latter being in charge of Unitech Wireless. In 2011, Sanjay Chandra was implicated in the 2G spectrum case and was arrested by the Central Bureau of Investigation. Ramesh Chandra was jailed on 11 January 2016 on charges of cheating.

== Personal life ==
He is married to Pushpa Chandra and has two children — Ajay Chandra and Sanjay Chandra.
