= Sanjay Chandra =

American businessman and criminal

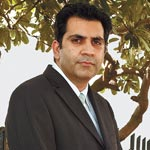
- Education: Graphic Era University; University of Massachusetts

Sanjay Chandra is the former Managing Director of Unitech Ltd, India's second-largest real estate investment company. Sanjay Chandra and Ajay Chandra had undergone two and a half years of incarceration in the case, having a maximum punishment of 7 years. After 7 years of punishment, he was given bail in a Unitech money laundering case. He is also on the board of Unitech Wireless.

== Early life and education ==
After attending Modern School in Vasant Vihar, New Delhi, Sanjay studied business management at the University of Massachusetts and received his MBA in finance from Graphic Era University, Dehradun.

== Career ==
Chandra founded Ikon Clothing Inc. in 1996 and was president until 2001, when he returned to India. Upon returning, Chandra joined Unitech Ltd. as the head of sales and marketing. In 2004, he was promoted to the position of Director.

Chandra was the key plenary in the real estate and infrastructure conference India GRI in 2007 for the Total Real Estate Discussion and appeared on the Expert Panel for India Retail Forum in 2005. He also chaired the India Advisory Board at the Second Annual ICSC Shopping Centre and Retail Conference in Mumbai in 2005 and gave the keynote address at the - 6th Annual Global Investor Conference, Mumbai, India in August 2010.

Chandra has received the 3rd Construction World Builders Awards from the Architect Leadership Council and was placed on the list of Young Global Leaders (YGL) by the World Economic Forum in Geneva in 2011.

== Legal proceedings ==
In his capacity as Director of Unitech, Sanjay Chandra was accused as a part of the 2G spectrum case. He is one of the industry leaders convicted of colluding with politicians such as A. Raja, then minister for communications & IT, to lower prices in the 2010 Indian cellular telephone frequency allocation auctions. The Supreme Court of India ruled that A. Raja "wanted to favor some companies at the cost of the public exchequer" and "virtually gifted away the important national asset."

Chandra was arrested in April 2011 and released on bail on 23 November 2011. In July 2013, the Central Bureau of Investigation (CBI) moved the Supreme Court to cancel his bail, alleging that he had attempted to "sabotage the trial." Legal proceedings are ongoing.

There are also several legal proceedings against Unitech by customers and the Haryana Government. The Hon'ble Supreme Court has directed monies paid for a delayed project to be refunded to buyers. Sanjay Chandra was arrested concerning a money laundering case by the Economic Offences Wing of the Delhi Police.

Custodial interrogation of former Unitech promoters Sanjay and Ajay Chandra is needed as "volumes of evidence have been found against them," the Enforcement Directorate told the Supreme Court today. It is necessary to bring the Chandra brothers to Delhi and confront them with the evidence, the agency told the court. They were granted bail by furnishing two sureties of Rs 1 lakh each and on the condition that they wouldn't leave the country
