= Yashodham =

Coordinates: 19.17181°N 72.85912°E

Yashodham (Hindi: यशोधाम) is a densely populated locality in Mumbai, India, close to Goregaon railway station. It has around a hundred residential buildings ranging from 5 to 30 floors high and forthcoming constructions are expected to be higher. There is one school in the area, Yashodham High School. Krishna Vatika Temple, Gokuldham High School and Gokuldham Medical Centre are situated nearby. The Oberoi Mall and Royal Challenge Hotel are nearby landmarks. The nearby BEST bus depot allows travel to destinations such as Dahisar, Kashimira, Goregaon Station, Borivli, Kandivali, Mulund, Kurla, Sion and Sewri.
