= Conservation Education Centre =

The Conservation Education Centre (CEC) is the education and awareness wing of the Bombay Natural History Society (BNHS). The Conservation Education Centre is located on the BNHS Nature Reserve in Goregaon, Mumbai, India. The CEC came into existence on the BHNS Reserve in 1997.

The centre is situated on 33 acres of forest land of the BNHS Nature Reserve. This land was leased by the Government of Maharashtra to BNHS in 1983 during its centenary celebrations. The CEC was established in 1993. The BNHS Nature Reserve lies between the Sanjay Gandhi National Park and Film City.

National Park (formerly known as the Borivali National Park) is the catchment area for Mumbai's lakes and is home for 25 species of mammals (including leopards), 275 species of birds, 150 species of butterflies and various species of flora. It is common to see many of the park's biodiversity occurring within the BNHS Nature Reserve as well.

Since its inception in 1997, the centre has designed and implemented 24 educational projects. It has also developed 161 educational materials, including three teachers' manuals, two student manuals, and five field guides. It has hosted 42 exhibits. It also has 573 books based on education and natural history at its library.

== History of CEC ==
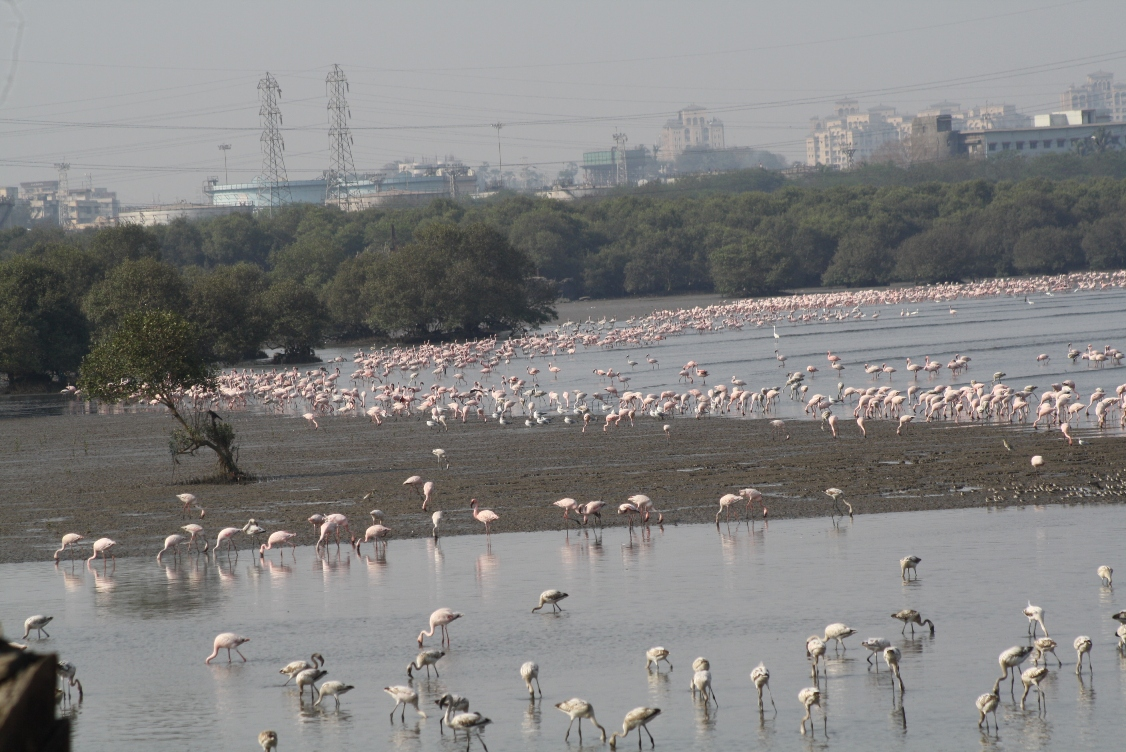
Bird-watching programmes are organized to watch flamingos in Sewri, Mumbai.

In 1993 the Bombay Natural History Society (BNHS) initiated a three-year Conservation Education Project (CEP) in Mumbai, Tamil Nadu and Bharatpur. The project was funded by Department of International Development, U.K. (formerly known as ODA) in technical collaboration with Royal Society for the Protection of Birds (RSPB), U.K. The aim of the project was to study the biotic pressure exerted by the people living in and around three protected areas, namely Sanjay Gandhi National Park, Mudumalai Wildlife Sanctuary and Keoladeo National Park.

The outcome of the study was to provide remedies for reducing the biotic pressures involving local stakeholders. The final product of the project was to establish a Conservation Education Centre (CEC) in Mumbai for continuing education in environment education. The CEC became functional in 1997 on the BNHS Nature Reserve (BNR) which was leased by the Government of Maharashtra.

== Educational programmes ==
The educational programmes for students cover basic environmental aspects. As part of these programmes, CEC shows audio-video interactive presentations. The Bombay Natural History Society (BNHS) has been actively establishing nature clubs for the past 10 years under the banner of "Hornbill Nature Club", aptly named after the BNHS mascot. The nature club activities include syllabus based programmes that are conducted throughout the year. The CEC conducts a range of indoor and outdoor activities with students and teachers.

== Corporate programmes ==
Corporate Programmes at CEC are customized employee sensitization workshops that include wilderness camps, eco-days celebrations and volunteering opportunities. Activities such as tree planting, habitat restoration, clean-up drive and awareness campaigns are also conducted. These workshops consist of presentations on carbon footprints, green lifestyle biodiversity plot study and E-waste.

== Biodiversity surveys ==
The USP of the Bombay Natural History Society has been conservation through scientific studies, which form the basis of environment education imparted by CEC. The CEC has been involved in several biodiversity surveys at various locations in and around Mumbai.

The biodiversity surveys undertaken by CEC include:

- Rapid Biodiversity Assessment Survey of Welspun, Salav (2010-2011)
- Biodiversity Survey of Nature Park in Navi Mumbai (2006-2008)
- Biodiversity Survey of ICI Campus in Kopar Khairane, Navi Mumbai (2004-2005)

== Online courses ==
CEC has been conducting online year-long courses in biodiversity conservation and entomology for the past two years. In 2013, CEC launched a two more year-long online courses in basic ornithology and herpetology. The following courses are hosted by CEC:

- Leadership Course in Biodiversity Conservation
- Basic Course in Herpetology
- Course in Basic Ornithology
- Young Naturalist course

In 2017, Conservation Education Centre, BNHS (Mumbai) is conducting five online hybrid courses with newly designed syllabi. Two of the courses are of short duration and are of six months duration. Following are the courses of CEC, BNHS:

- Leadership Course in Biodiversity Conservation (course duration is one year: June 2016 to May 2017)
- Basic Course in Ornithology (course duration is one year: July 2017 to June 2018)
- Basic Course in Herpetology (course duration is six months: June 2017 to Nov 2017)
- Certificate Course in Butterfly studies (course duration is six months: June 2017 to Nov 2017)

== Training and workshops ==
CEC organizes workshop and training programmes about various aspects of environmental and education. The following workshops are imparted at CEC:

- Professional Development Workshop for Teachers
- Green Lifestyle Workshop for School, Community or Corporates
- Green Guide Training Programme
- Citizen Science Project: Be a Scientist for a Day

== Notable conservation education projects ==
CEC has completed 26 conservation education projects in different streams of environment education such as implementation of nature education centres, establishing Hornbill Nature Clubs, developing environment education materials, conducting biodiversity surveys, and conducting training and capacity building programmes. The following are a few notable projects undertaken by CEC:

=== Ongoing projects ===
==== Conservation Education Centre, Delhi (2005-present) ====
The CEC was set up at the Asola Bhatti Wildlife Sanctuary. It was modeled on CEC Mumbai. This centre contains interactive educational displays, nature trails, educational resources for teachers, outreach programmes in Delhi schools, and interaction with non-government organisations and decision makers. The funding agency is the Delhi Forest Department.

==== Hornbill Nature Club at Gold Crest High School (2011) ====
The CEC launched the Hornbill Nature Club in Goldcrest High School in Vashi in June 2011. The activities in the club are based on nine themes: Biodiversity, Monsoon Diversity, Endangered Wildlife, Grassland Ecosystem, Water Conservation, Energy Conservation, Adaptation in Nature, Waste Management and Mangroves.

=== Completed projects ===
==== Nature Interpretation Centre (Matheran) ====
This Nature Interpretation Centre aims at raising awareness about the environment and to address the need for nature conservation, besides highlighting the importance of the Eco-Sensitive zone in Matheran. Under the first phase of this project Conservation Education Centre will carry out a basic biodiversity survey of Matheran, identify nature trails, establish a butterfly and medicinal garden and train the locals as nature guides for the Matheran Municipal Corporation. The basic biodiversity survey will be conducted for the plants, insects, amphibians, reptiles and birds. The list of flora and fauna developed during the survey will be used to develop exhibits in the second phase of the projects. The nature trail identification involves a survey of the existing paths to check the biodiversity, and the possibility of conducting a nature trail on these paths will be explored. These trails will be mapped on Google Maps and will be included in the Nature Trail Manual.

==== Periyar Consultancy Project (1997-2000) ====
The project involved a complete and comprehensive awareness-attitude survey of visitors, staff and locals at the Periyar Tiger Reserve in Kerala. The objective was to study the awareness level and attitude of people towards forest resources, forest department and ecodevelopment activities. Based on the results of this survey, recommendations were made for new educational activities that could be carried out, new exhibits to be installed to raise the awareness level and outreach programmes to improve community relations. The funding agency was Project Tiger.

==== Capacity Development Programme for Teachers (1999-2002) ====
This encompassed the development of new educational material such as displays, signage and audiovisuals as well as training workshops for teachers. A Green Teacher Kit was then developed as a resource material for teachers on natural history and environment education. The project also initiated a series of environmental awareness programmes in schools across Mumbai. The funding agency was the Tata Education Trust.

==== Vacation Training Programme in Bioresources for School Children (2005-2006) ====
A month-long course was designed to train and enhance awareness in school children about the relevance of bioresources, and the relationship between bioresources and biotechnology. The course consisted of extensive field trips to different ecosystems within Mumbai. The funding was done by Department of Biotechnology, Govt. of India.

==== Conservation Education Programme for Underprivileged Children (2006-2007) ====
The project was commenced in January 2006 and involved bringing groups of underprivileged children through NGOs for an all expenses paid visit to CEC. The CEC was visited by 2535 students form 16 NGOs and 10 schools. This project also encompassed a wide variety of innovative installations like new displays for the display room, signage for the nature trails and even a wallpaper magazine, Dhanesh, that was distributed amongst BMC schools. The funding was done by the Public Affairs Section of the U.S. Department of State, American Consulate.

==== Hornbill Nature Clubs for Underpriviledged Schools (2010-2011) ====
Named after the iconic mascot of the Bombay Natural History Society, Hornbill Clubs were designed to be conservation nature clubs. In 2007, Hornbill Nature Clubs were initiated and established in two schools for underprivileged students: Maharani Sai Bai Vidyalaya and Mangesh Vidyalaya. These nature clubs focused on imparting environment literacy through indoor and outdoor programmes. In 2008, Hornbill nature clubs were set up in two additional schools viz Harnai Vidyalaya and Gurukul Vidyalaya. The funding of this project was done by Dr. Mrudula Thakkar.

==== World Environment Day in Mumbai (2011) ====
The project aimed at creating awareness about Mumbai's environment amongst the citizens. Under this project the World Environment Day was celebrated in Mumbai and funded by Ministry of Environment and Forests and UNEP. Through this project, the Bombay Natural History Society developed 22 panel exhibition on Mumbai'seEnvironment. This exhibition was installed at CST and Churchgate stations from 2–4 June 2011.

On the eve of World Environment Day, the closing ceremony was organized at BNHS's Conservation Education Centre, wherein the book Green Guide for Teachers was launched by the hands of Smt. Usha Thorat, vice-president, BNHS. The bilingual book was funded by MMR Environment Improvement Society (MMREIS) and Sir Dorabaji Tata Trust.
