= Loop Mobile =

Indian telecommunications company

Loop Mobile India Ltd
- Formerly: BPL Mobile Communications
- Company type: Private
- Industry: Telecommunication
- Founded: 1994
- Defunct: 29 November 2014
- Fate: Ceased operations after expiration of licence
- Headquarters: Mahim, Mumbai, Maharashtra, India
- Key people: IP Khaitan (Shareholder) Nalin Khaitan (Director) Sandip Basu (CEO)
- Services: Mobile telephony

Loop Mobile India Ltd, formerly BPL Mobile Communications, was an Indian mobile network operator.

== History ==
BPL Mobile Communications, established in 1994, was India's first mobile network operator. It began commercial operations in 1995. The Khaitan Holdings Group purchased a 99% stake in the company at a cost of ₹700 crore (equivalent to ₹24 billion or US$250 million in 2023) in 2005. BPL Mobile was renamed to Loop Mobile in March 2009. Having consistently met and exceeded Telecom Regulatory Authority of India benchmarks, Loop Mobile was ISO 9001:2008 certified in 2009, in accordance with the TUV NORD CERT auditing and certification procedures.

On 18 February 2014, Bharti Airtel announced that it was acquiring Loop Mobile for ₹700 crore (equivalent to ₹11 billion or US$120 million in 2023), prior to that, a Chennai-based Information Technology Company, Zeesta IT Services MD Hemanth Raj, evaluated to acquire, however the deal did not materialize. The two companies had been in talks since mid-2013. Loop Mobile's 20-year licence in the 900 MHz band was due to expire in the last quarter of 2014, and the company did not participate in the 2014 spectrum auction. However, on 5 November 2014, Bharti announced that it was dropping plans to acquire Loop Mobile, after the former failed to gain regulatory approval from the Department of for the acquisition.

The acquisition would have increased Airtel's total customer base in Mumbai to more than 7 million customers and increased the size of their network to 6,500 cell sites. Airtel also would have acquired electronic equipment, optic fibre and the 8 megahertz of spectrum in the 900 MHz band held by Loop in Mumbai. However, Airtel had no plans to acquire Loop Mobile's 550 employees.

The announcement of the acquisition had prompted most Loop Mobile subscribers to switch mobile operators, and the operator had approximately 1 million customers by the first week of November 2014, down from 3 million subscribers when the deal was first announced in February 2014. Loop Mobile's licence to operate mobile services in Mumbai expired on 29 November 2014, bringing an end to its operations.

== Controversy ==
Loop Telecom was probed by the Central Bureau of Investigation for alleged violation of foreign exchange laws, in the amount of ₹384 crore (US$40 million), in connection with the 2G spectrum case. The promoters of Loop telecom were acquitted in December 2017 by the special court investigating the matter, which ruled that the prosecution "has miserably failed to prove any charge against any of the accused. Consequently, all the accused are entitled to be acquitted."

On 18 August 2011, Loop mobile, along with Bharti Airtel, Idea Cellular, Reliance Communications and Vodafone, was issued notices by the Telecom Regulatory Authority of India (TRAI) for violation of mobile number portability regulations. According to TRAI, they had received complaints from customers regarding improper rejection of porting requests by telecom operators and also ₹10 crore (US$1.0 million) being charged for messages requesting the porting code through number 1900. In April 2012 Loop Mobile announced its intention to shut down operations across India except Mumbai with effect from 15 May 2012. The move is expected to impact 6,100 customers, however, the figure is much less than 0.01% of the number of mobile phone users in India.
