= Unitech Group =

Real estate investment company

- Type: Public
- Traded as: BSE: 507878; NSE: UNITECH
- Industry: Real estate
- Founded: 1972
- Founder: Ramesh Chandra
- Headquarters: New Delhi, India
- Key people: Giridhar Aramane, Executive Chairman
- Revenue: ▼₹491.95 crore (US$51 million) (FY23)
- Operating income: ▲₹53.61 crore (US$5.6 million) (FY23)
- Net income: ▼₹−2,787.67 crore (US$−290 million) (FY23)
- Total assets: ▲₹26,885.56 crore (US$2.8 billion) (FY23)
- Total equity: ▼₹−1,139.92 crore (US$−120 million) (FY23)
- Number of employees: 400+ (2021)
- Website: unitechgroup.com

Unitech Limited is an Indian real estate investment company headquartered in New Delhi, and once claimed to be the largest real estate builder in the country.

The company is based in New Delhi, and ranks 1484, in Forbes Global 2000 listing of the top 2000 public companies in the world by Forbes magazine, 32nd in India. Its construction business includes highways, roads, powerhouses, transmission lines, and it has residential projects called Unitech Cities/Uni World, in cities like Mumbai, Delhi, Kolkata, Bhubaneswar, Chennai, Hyderabad, Mohali, Bangalore, Kochi, Noida, Greater Noida, Agra, Lucknow, Varanasi, Gurgaon, and Ghaziabad.

== History ==
Founded by 5 partners, Ramesh Chandra, Dr. S. P. Shrivastava, Dr. P K Mohanti, Dr. Ramesh Kapur and Dr. Bahri originally formed as United Technical Consultant Private Ltd in 1972 as a soil investigation company. They later moved into civil engineering contracts in 1974. The company began to enter into real estate in 1986, and started to increase focus on real estate in 2000. Few year back, it was India's second-largest listed real estate firm.

Unitech had formed a large joint venture with Norway-based Telenor Group to create Unitech Wireless Ltd., in August 2009, it secured a 50 billion rupee ($1 billion) loan from State Bank of India (SBI.BO) to fund its mobile phone network rollout.

=== Prosecutions ===
In 2011, due to the 2G-spectrum controversy (explained below), the company got involved in a public spat due to which its Chairman Sanjay Chandra al while on bail over Telenor's pressure to do so, followed by news of Unitech's settlement of issues by agreeing to sell its entire stake in the Unitech Wireless to shift the business to a new entity owned by the former almost 1 year later and then Telenor shifted the erstwhile United Wireless' entire assets into a newly formed holding company as its majority-owned subsidiary Telewings Communications Services Pvt. Ltd., another joint-venture which 26% stake was owned by an investment firm named Lakshdeep Investments & Finance Pvt. Ltd. and rest of the 74% owned by Telenor directly, thus sealing the end of Unitech's presence into telecommunications so far, only after 15 days since last development.

In 2021, the Enforcement Directorate filed a criminal case against Unitech Limited under suspicion that the organization had illegally diverted Rs 2,000 crore to tax havens. Another 2023 criminal fraud case was filed by the ED against the organization and its directors.

==== 2G spectrum case ====
Unitech Wireless is one of the accused in the 2G spectrum case. It is alleged that they were able to attain 2G licenses by bribing officials in the Indian Government even though they didn't have any previous telecom experience. As a fallout of this they had a total of 22 licenses cancelled by virtue of a court order, and their Managing Director Sanjay Chandra sent to jail.
