= Vir Sanghvi =

Indian writer

- Born: 5 July 1956 (age 70); London, England
- Occupations: Journalist, writer
- Spouse(s): Malavika Sanghvi (divorced); Seema Goswami
- Children: 1
- Website: http://www.virsanghvi.com/

Vir Sanghvi (born 5 July 1956) is an Indian print and television journalist, author, columnist and talk show host. He has been a member of many professional, academic and government bodies including the National Integration Council. Currently, he is a member of the Broadcast Content Complaint Council (BCCC), a body that regulates content on entertainment TV channels and Co-Founder/Lead Food Critic at EazyDiner. He is an opponent of the Hindutva ideology.

== Early life and education ==
Vir Sanghvi was born to Ramesh and Vimoo Sanghvi into a Gujarati Jain family on 5 July 1956 in London. His father was a former-communist barrister turned businessman who hailed from a middle class family in Rajkot while his mother was an industrial psychologist who hailed from a wealthy textile-mill owning family from Ahmedabad comparable to the Sarabhais.

Sanghvi was brought up in Bombay (now Mumbai) and London and educated at Mayo College, Ajmer, and Mill Hill School, London. He went on to study politics, philosophy and economics at Brasenose College, Oxford on the Inlaks Scholarship.

His show Custom Made for Vir Sanghvi on NDTV Goodtimes, where he travels across India, in search of the most luxurious and bespoke 'Indian' experiences has received high ratings and been renewed for a second season. His published books include Rude Food, India – Then and Now and Men of Steel (a collection of profiles of India's leading businessmen. He has also authored a biography of the late Madhavrao Scindia, which was released by Sonia Gandhi in 2009.

== Personal life ==
Vir Sanghavi married Malavika Sanghvi. They had a son Raaj Sanghvi. Later he divorced Malavika and married Seema Goswami.

== Controversy ==
In 2010, Sanghvi was connected to the Nira Radia tapes. In the audio tape Sanghvi was heard asking "What kind of story do you want?" It is alleged that he made some points suggested by Radia in his article titled 'Time for some transparency' under Sanghvi's column "Counterpoint". Sanghvi denied all allegations and uploaded the article onto his website for readers to make their own judgement. On 27 November 2010, Sanghvi released a detailed statement in the Hindustan Times, clarifying his role, and also raising the possibility of the tapes being edited. Due to the heightened interest in him Sanghvi temporarily suspended his weekly article "Counterpoint".

In January 2012, The Union Government told the Supreme Court that the Radia tapes broadcast by media organisations were tampered with and the government agencies were not responsible for its leakage.

== Food critic and journalist ==
Vir Sanghvi writes a column, Rude Food, in the Hindustan Times Brunch magazine. Also given the “Best Food Critic” award from the Indian Culinary Foundation, Vir is the creator and host of the television shows “A Matter of Taste” and "Vir Sanghvi’s Asian Diary" on the Discovery Travel Living channel. He was also the lead judge for the television cooking competition, Foodistan. He is the co-founder and lead critic of online restaurant reservation platform, EazyDiner.

== Books by Vir Sanghvi ==
- Men of Steel – India's business leaders in candid conversation with Vir Sanghvi, Roli Books Pvt Ltd, India, Jan 2007, ISBN 81-7436-474-9
- A Rude Life
- Rude Food: The Collected Food Writings of Vir Sanghvi, Penguin Putnam (2004) ISBN 0-14-303139-2
- India Then and Now : Now/Vir Sanghvi. New Delhi, Roli, 2006, ISBN 81-7436-397-1.
- 26/11:The Attack on Mumbai, Penguin, 2009, ISBN 978-0-14-306705-4
- Madhavrao Scindia: A life, Penguin, 2009, ISBN 978-0-670-08254-4
- Mandate: Will of the People, Westland, 2016, ISBN 978-9384030391
- The Game Changers: Transforming India, Westland, 2019, ISBN 9789388754675
