= Radia tapes controversy =

2010 Indian political controversy

The Radia tapes controversy relates to the telephonic conversations between Niira Radia, a political lobbyist in India, the (then) Indian telecom minister A. Raja, and senior journalists, politicians, and corporate houses, taped by the Indian Income Tax Department in 2008–09. The tapes were leaked out to the press, and were eventually published by some media outlets and shown by television channels.

The revelations in the tapes led to accusations of misconduct by many of these people and served a precursor to the 2G scam and a stronger checks for the media. Niira Radia used to run a public relations firm named 'Vaishnavi Communications' which was the object of CBI investigations.

== Description ==
After getting authorisation from the Home Ministry, the Indian Income Tax department tapped Radia's phone lines for 300 days in 2008–2009 as part of their investigations into possible money laundering, restricted financial practices, and tax evasion.

In November 2010, OPEN magazine carried a story which reported transcripts of some of the telephone conversations of Niira Radia with senior journalists, politicians, and corporate houses, many of whom have denied the allegations. The Central Bureau of Investigation has announced that they have 5,851 recordings of phone conversations by Radia, some of which outline Radia's attempts to broker deals in relation to the 2G spectrum sale. The tapes appear to demonstrate how Radia attempted to use some media persons to influence the decision to appoint A. Raja as telecom minister.

In the recorded conversations between Niira Radia and prominent figures, referred to as the Radia Tapes, several prominent figures are heard in conversation with Radia:

=== Politicians ===
- Ranjan Bhattacharya (foster son-in-law of former prime minister Atal Bihari Vajpayee)
- Kanimozhi, Senior DMK politician and daughter of M. Karunanidhi
- Andimuthu Raja, Senior DMK politician and Former cabinet minister of communication and Information Technology
- Dayanidhi Maran, Senior DMK politician and grandnephew of M. Karunanidhi and Former cabinet minister of communication and Information Technology
- Arun Jaitley, senior BJP politician (later Finance Minister of India from 2014 to 2019)

=== Journalists ===
- Barkha Dutt, then Group editor, English news, New Delhi Television (NDTV),
- Prabhu Chawla, then editor of India Today magazine
- Shankar Aiyar, then with India Today Group
- Vir Sanghvi, HT advisory editorial director
- Rohini Singh, then with Economic Times, now at the Wire
- Casual conversations with Radia of Editors of The Times of India, The Economic Times and The Hindu Businessline also figured in the tapes published by Outlook magazine.

=== Others ===
- Ratan Tata (industrialist)

== Political lobbying ==
The transcripts of the tapes, referred to the lobbying activity against the reappointment of Dayanidhi Maran to the post of Union IT and Communications minister in the UPA tenure in Indian government.

- Conversation with journalist Barkha Dutt at 0948 IST.
- In a later conversation at 1047 IST, Barkha says that it (conveying the message to Congress(ruling government in the year)) was 'not a problem' and that she would talk to Ghulam (Nabi Azad) (Indian politician and Congress member).
- Radia later talks to Ranjan Bhattacharya, who also appears to be acting as a conduit to the Congress. She also mentions over the call that Sunil (Bharti) Mittal (Airtel head), has been lobbying.'

== Media blackout and reactions in social media ==
The news gained prominence following sustained pressure on social networking sites Twitter and Facebook against an attempted blackout orchestrated by many prominent Indian TV channels and newspapers. According to The Washington Post, "Twitter has played an important role in launching what has become an international conversation on the issue, with the Indian diaspora weighing in".

Initially, only a handful of the mainstream newspapers in India, like The Deccan Herald, Indian Express had openly written about the tapes. Some newspapers like HT Media, Mint (the business newspaper also owned by HT media) and NDTV said "the authenticity of these transcripts cannot be ascertained". CNN-IBN's Sagarika Ghose discussed with a panel of experts, if the corporate lobbying is undermining democracy, on the "Face the Nation" programme on the channel. The Radia tapes is seen to have also made a dent in the image of the media in the country. "The complete blackout of the Niira Radia tapes by the entire broadcast media and most of the major English newspapers paints a truer picture of corruption in the country," wrote G Sampath, the deputy editor of the Daily News and Analysis (DNA) newspaper. After it became an international news, more and more media houses covered the story. The Deccan Chronicle commented, "The 'Radia tapes' may have torn the veil off the nexus between information hungry journalists, lobbyists and industrialists, and opened everyone’s eyes to what has long been suspected — the ability of a small but powerful group to use their connections to influence policy." The largest circulated English newspaper in India and the world, The Times of India finally opened up on 25 November 2010, commenting "The people are showing who the boss is. The weapon in their hands is the internet, has seen frantic activism against "power brokering" by journalists in collusion with corporate groups and top government politicians..."

== Protests and developments ==
M.K.Venu had filed a criminal defamation case against Outlook magazine for mentioning him on its cover. Outlook gave an unconditional apology in the court for mistakenly naming M.K.Venu and acknowledged his consistent writings against Telecom Minister A.Raja. News of the apology was published in Outlook, Indian Express and The Hindu. Open Magazine maintained that the conversations were carried as they appeared in the recordings. Dutt defended her reputation through her Twitter account. "Struck by the bizarre irony of being accused of favouring a man i have never met (raja) and have always attacked in print and on TV. Gnite!," she said via one of her tweets on Twitter.

New Delhi Television Limited posted a strong rebuttal on its website terming the insinuation that Barkha lobbied for A Raja as "unsubstantiated, baseless and defamatory" and threatened action against Open Magazine.

Hindustan Times cited Sanghvi's clarifications on his website, and stated that the authenticity of these transcripts cannot be ascertained. Vinod Mehta wrote opposition leader Arun Jaitley said Barkha Dutt pleaded to him not to mention about the conversation in the parliament while attacking the government on the 2G case.

On 26 November 2010, Barkha Dutt released a detailed statement, addressing questions raised by the tapes, which she claims were edited. On 27 November 2010, Vir Sanghvi released a detailed statement, clarifying his role.

Writing about the controversy in the Hindustan Times, Rajdeep Sardesai said that "The robust Indian tradition of adversarial journalism has been mortgaged at the altar of cozy networks." Tavleen Singh said it was "very, very disappointing", and added that "corruption when it involves ethics" was worse than "taking money". Sumnima Udas of the CNN wrote that the tapes revealed that Dutt served as a power brokers for a deal considered to be one of India's biggest ever scams.

Niira Radia has served a legal notice on The Pioneer, on the report titled "Tapped and Trapped" published by the newspaper. The notice asserted that The Pioneer's report regarding corruption and manipulation in the allotment of 2G spectrum to telecom operators, in so far as it referred to Radia's connections with Telecom Minister A Raja, are "absolutely false, baseless and malicious and constitute gross defamation".

The original tapes are now annexures in a Supreme Court petition seeking Raja's prosecution. The opposition parties in India have demanded a Joint Parliamentary Committee (JPC) probe into the 2G spectrum case, which could also to be extended to include a probe into the Radia tapes to ascertain the media's role in the controversy. The Government is also accused of selectively releasing merely 10 hours of the 2000 hours recorded of the Radia tapes.

The CBI in its affidavit in the Supreme Court in the 2G spectrum allocation case, on 22 November 2010, had stated that Radia will be approached for investigation at an appropriate time. and that the probe would be completed latest by March 2011. On 24 November 2010, Niira Radia was questioned by the Enforcement Directorate (ED) officials and recorded her statements in relation to the 2G case probe.

On 1 August 2013 Supreme court asked whether the Income Tax department had informed the authorities which had directed the tapping of Radia's telephone about the sensitive and serious nature of the conversations.

At a hearing on 21 September 2022 in Ratan Tata's privacy case over the leaked recordings, the CBI told the Supreme Court that 14 preliminary inquiries into the intercepted Radia conversations had found no criminality; the Court allowed the agency to file an updated status report.

== Role of opposing political parties, business houses and lobbyists ==
Subsequently, it was revealed that while true to their word, the Niira Radia tapes themselves had been leaked to the Indian media by a lobbyist belonging to a powerful business family, connected to other politicians and private companies. In 2016, in an interview with Hindustan times, Josy Joseph, an Indian investigative journalist who had also received the tapes revealed that the Niira Radia tapes had been leaked to the Indian media, not by the government, but by a source ensconced in a rival lobbying organization, to settle their own internal rivalries. He said that the tapes also contained statements by Ratan Tata stating that the Tata group did not pay people under the table, but these segments were not run by media houses. Joseph wrote about these in his book A Feast of Vultures.

== See also ==
- Essar leaks
- Influence peddling
- Bribery
- Lobbying
