= Gokuldham =

- Neighborhood
- Gokuldham Aerial View

- Location within Mumbai
- Country: India
- State: Maharashtra
- District: Mumbai Suburban
- City: Mumbai

Government
  - Type: Municipal Corporation

Languages
  - Official: Marathi
- Time zone: UTC+5:30 (IST)
- PIN: 400063
- Area code: 022
- Civic agency: BMC

Gokuldham is a densely populated neighborhood in Mumbai, India, close to Goregaon railway station. It has over a hundred residential buildings from 5 to 45 floors high and forthcoming constructions are promised to be higher.

There are several schools in Gokuldham, Yashodham High School & Jr College, St Xavier's High School, Oberoi International School, Gokuldham High School, Lakshdham High School and Ryan International School. Also, Gokuldham has its own shopping malls & complexes (Oberoi Mall, Shagun Mall, Gagan Shopping Arcade). The local population congregates in and around the large temple - Gokuldham Temple - located near the entrance. There are many grounds and maidans here too.

== In popular culture ==
- Fictional setting of Gokuldham society in Taarak Mehta Ka Ooltah Chashmah sitcom is purportedly located in Goregaon.
