= Shahid Balwa =

Indian businessman

- Born: Gujarat, India
- Occupations: Promoter, DB Group & Managing Director, DB Group

Shahid Usman Balwa (born 1974) is an entrepreneur based in Mumbai, Maharashtra, India. He is one of the promoters of Mumbai-based DB Group.

== Early and personal life ==
Balwa comes from the Chilya Sunni Muslim community, and his forefathers were from Gujarat.

== Forbes billionaire ==
In 2010, Balwa was the youngest Indian to feature on the Forbes List and is amongst the 10 youngest billionaires in the world. He was ranked by Forbes as India's 50th richest man in 2010.

== 2G Case ==
Balwa was arrested for his role in the 2G spectrum case by the CBI on 9 February 2011 on the allegation that DB group transferred ₹ 2 billion to a media company owned by members of the DMK party. Former Telecom minister A. Raja allegedly helped Swan bag licences for 13 circles, including Mumbai and Delhi, for ₹ 15.37 billion. DB realty is one among the companies that purchased 2G licenses in 2008. DB Reality floated Swan Telecom. The CBI also arrested two executives on 29 March 2011 including the brother of Balwa, Asif Balwa. A Delhi high-court on 29 November 2011 accepted the bail plea of Shahid Balwa and other under-trials. On 21 December 2017, a Supreme Court appointed Special CBI Court acquitted him of all charges relating to his role in this case.

== Charitable work ==
His charitable activities are in the field of health and education. They include the Balwas High School and Charitable Medical Institution in Phirozpura, Gujarat.
