= Goregaon =

Suburb of Mumbai, Maharashtra, India

- Suburb
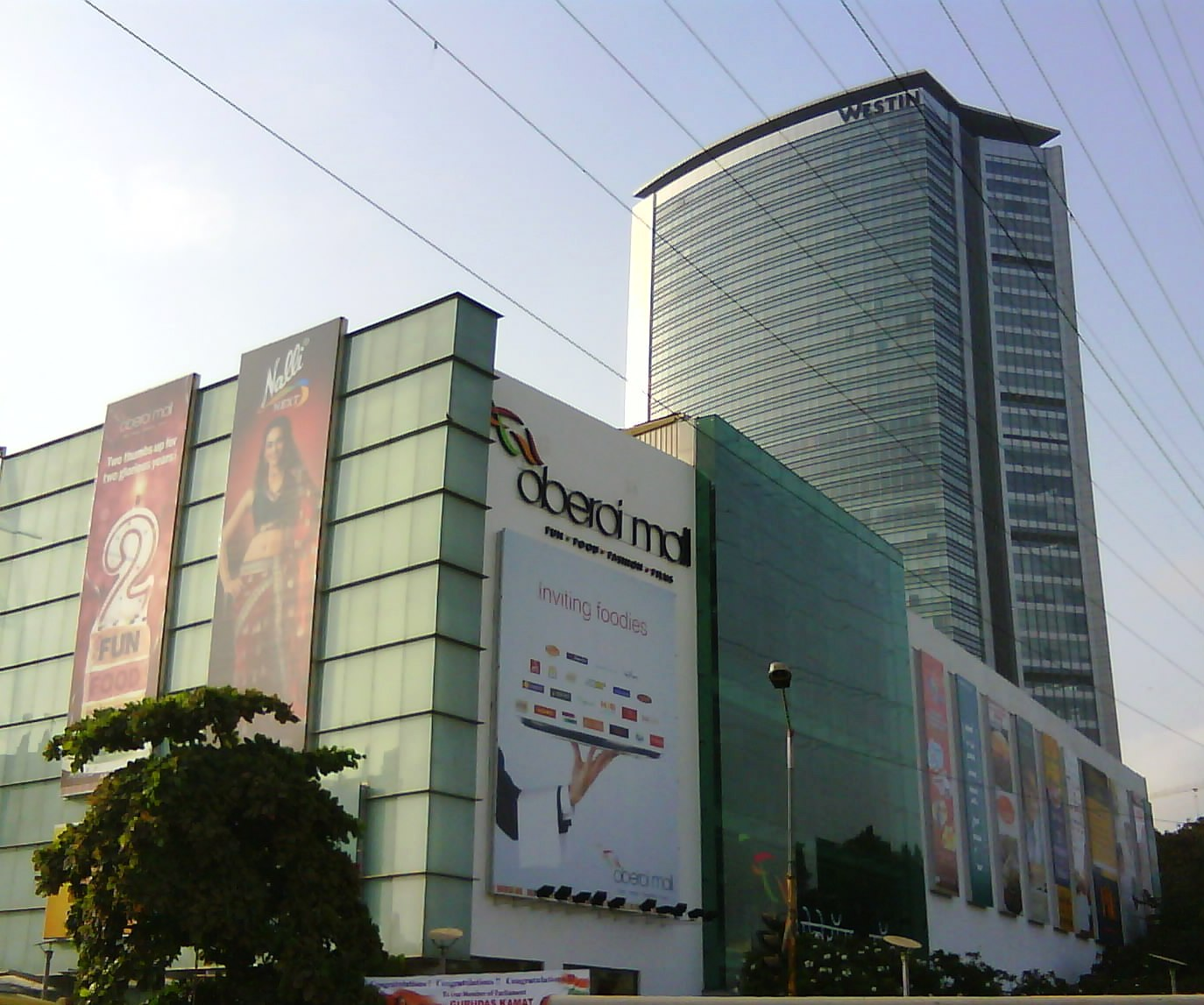
- The Oberoi Mall and Commerz tower (Westin Hotel), Goregaon, Mumbai.

- Location within Mumbai
- Coordinates: 19.155°N 72.85°E
- Country: India
- State: Maharashtra
- District: Mumbai Suburban
- City: Mumbai

Government
  - Type: Municipal Corporation
  - Body: Municipal Corporation of Greater Mumbai (MCGM)

Languages
  - Official: Marathi
- Time zone: UTC+5:30 (IST)
- PIN: 400062, 400104 (West), 400063 (East), 400097 (Gokuldham)
- Area code: 022
- Vehicle registration: MH-47
- Lok Sabha Constituency: Mumbai North West (Lok Sabha constituency)
- Vidhan Sabha Constituency: Goregaon (covers western part of the suburb); Dindoshi (covers eastern part of the suburb)

Goregaon is a suburb of Mumbai city, in the Mumbai Suburban district of Maharashtra, India. It has a railway station on the Mumbai Suburban Railway on the Western Line. An extension of the Harbour Line was completed in 2018, due to which it has regular trains to Chhatrapati Shivaji Maharaj Terminus (CSMT). This is in addition to the existing trains to Churchgate on the Western Line. Owing to rapid urbanization (mainly due to the construction of metro lines) and the growing population of metropolitan Mumbai, Goregaon, which was once a hilly forest region, is now a crowded suburb of Mumbai.

Mumbai local trains originate and terminate at Goregaon. Platforms 1 and 2 operate slow trains towards Churchgate and CSMT whereas, Platform 7 operates fast trains towards Churchgate.

Gokuldham in Goregaon (East)

== Transport ==
Goregaon Railway Station is the transport hub of Goregaon. The station currently has seven platforms, two of which are new Harbor Line platforms, and was expanded as a part of the Harbour Line extension (under MUTP 2) from Andheri. The expansion, involving two additional platforms and an elevated deck with passenger amenities (on the western side of the existing station) was completed in 2018.

A recently constructed skywalk connects one of the foot-over-bridges to S. V. Road near Citi Centre, a shopping complex near the M. G. Road junction. BEST has bus stations on both the Western and the Eastern sides of the railway station. Goregaon Bus Depot, however, is located away from the railway station, on Link Road. The link road has seen an increase in the traffic of late after the commencement of the Mumbai Metro construction work.

There is a flyover named Mrinal Tai Gore Flyover at Ram Mandir road, connecting Goregaon West and Goregaon East.It has been operational since 2016 and links the Western Express Highway (WEH) in Goregaon East to the Ram Mandir Junction in Goregaon West. In addition, Ram Mandir railway station is operational since December 2016. The next important transport project for Goregaon will be the GMLR (Goregaon Mulund Link Road) which will be a 5km underground road consisting of two tunnels each having three lanes. This road will link Goregaon to Bhandup.

In November 2025, construction also began on a ₹418-crore cable-stayed bridge spanning 542 metres across Goregaon Creek, connecting Bhagat Singh Nagar in Goregaon to Oshiwara in Andheri, with a projected completion of October 2028.

== Nature and conservation ==
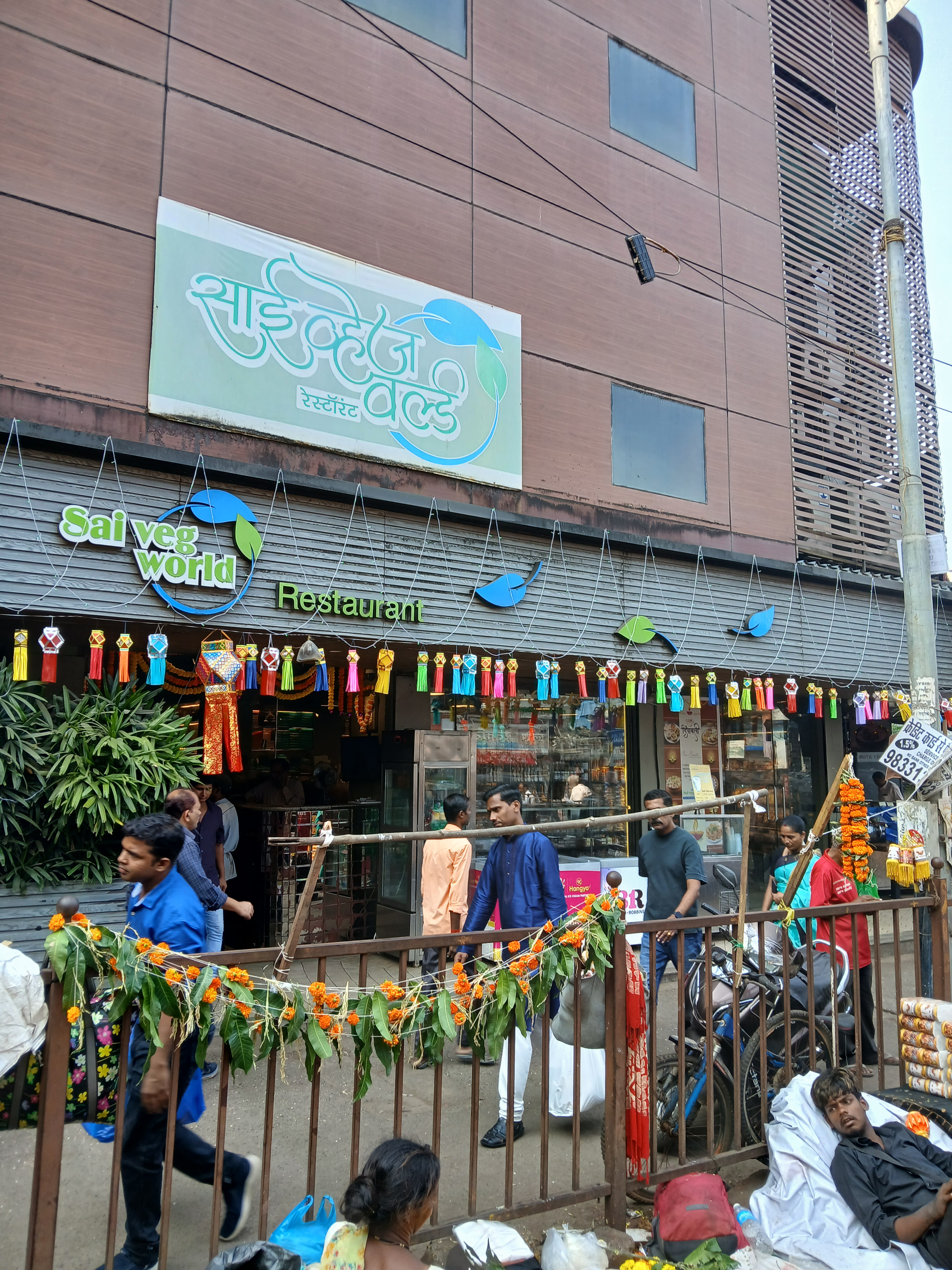
Restaurant in Goregaon

Goregaon shares a boundary with the Sanjay Gandhi National Park from the south-western side and is home to the Conservation Education Centre (CEC), run by the Bombay Natural History Society (BNHS). The area is home to a diverse flora and fauna.

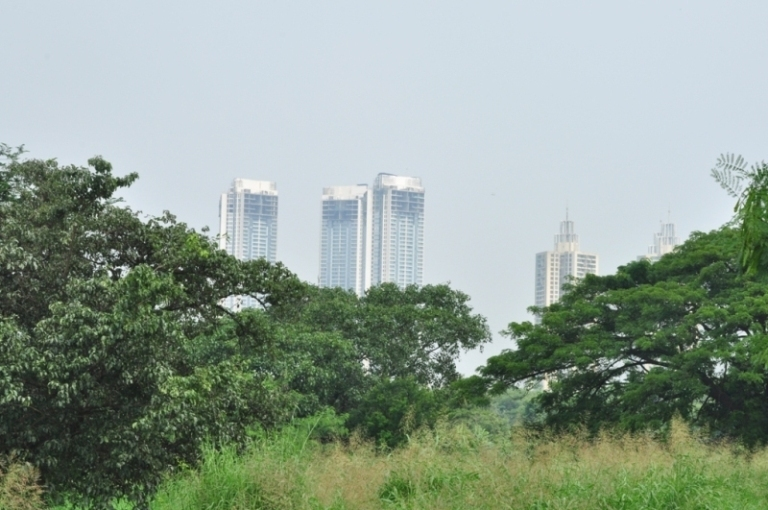
Aarey Colony and high-rises in the background

Recent development on the eastern side has led to a huge amount of deforestation. Leopard sightings and even the occasional attacks are not very rare and not just in the hamlets inside the Aarey Forest but also in large residential colonies like Nagari Nivara Parishad.

== Education ==
=== Colleges ===
- Indira Gandhi Institute of Development Research

=== Schools ===
- Oberoi International School
