= 2G spectrum case =

Ongoing alleged scam case

The 2G spectrum case was a political controversy in which politicians and private officials of the United Progressive Alliance (UPA) coalition government in India were allegedly involved in selling or allotting 122 2G spectrum licenses on conditions that provided an advantage to specific telecom operators. A. Raja, then Telecom Minister, was accused of selling 2G spectrum licenses at a very low cost which resulted in the loss of ₹1,760 billion (US$25 billion) in government revenue. Raja was also accused of not following rules as well as not recognizing any advice from the Ministries of Finance and Law and Justice of India while allotting 2G spectrum licenses to telecom operators. Series of allegations were made on allotting 2G spectrum licenses including allegations from Central Bureau of Investigation after investigating the case alleging Raja for intentionally advancing the cut-off date (from 01/10/2007 to 25/09/2007) to favour specific firms (Unitech Wireless and Swan Telecom), which were allegedly ineligible for applying for telecom licenses, in return for bribes.

On 21 December 2017, a special court in New Delhi acquitted all accused in the 2G spectrum case including the prime accused Raja and Kanimozhi. The court ruled that the case was baseless. As per the judgement, "Some people created a scam by artfully arranging a few selected facts and exaggerating things beyond recognition to astronomical levels."

On 19 and 20 March 2018, the Enforcement Directorate and the CBI respectively filed appeals against this verdict in the Delhi High Court. On 22 March 2024, Delhi High Court's single-judge bench of Justice Dinesh Kumar Sharma agreed that the trial court's judgement required deeper examination and re-appreciation of entire evidence and admitted the CBI's appeal. The High Court noted that there were several contradictions in the trial court's judgement.

== Background ==
India is divided into 22 telecommunications zones, with 281 zonal licenses. In 2008, 122 new second-generation 2G Unified Access Service (UAS) licenses were granted to telecom companies on a first-come, first-served basis at the 2001 price. According to the CBI charge sheet, several laws were violated and bribes were paid to favour certain firms in granting 2G spectrum licenses. According to a CAG audit, licenses were granted to ineligible corporations, those with no experience in the telecom sector (such as Unitech and Swan Telecom) and those who had concealed relevant information. Although former Prime Minister Manmohan Singh advised Raja to allot 2G spectrum transparently and revise the license fee in a November 2007 letter, Raja rejected many of Singh's recommendations. In another letter that month, the Ministry of Finance expressed procedural concerns to the DOT; these were ignored, and the cut-off date was moved forward from 1 October to 25 September 2007.

On 25 September 2007 the DOT announced on its website that applicants filing between 3:30 and 4:30 pm that day would be granted licenses. Although the policy for awarding licences was first-come, first-served, which was introduced during Atal Bihari Vajpayee Government, Raja changed the rules so it applied to compliance with conditions instead of the application itself. On 10 January 2008, companies were given only a few hours to supply Letters of Intent and payments; some executives were allegedly tipped off by Raja. Although the corporation was ineligible, Swan Telecom was granted a license for ₹15.37 billion (US$160 million) and sold a 45-percent share to the UAE-based Etisalat for ₹42 billion (US$450 million). Unitech Wireless (a subsidiary of the Unitech Group) obtained a license for ₹16.61 billion (US$180 million), selling a 60-percent share for ₹62 billion (US$660 million) to Norway-based Telenor.

The following is a list of companies who received 2G licenses during Andimuthu Raja's term as telecom minister; the licenses were later cancelled by the Supreme Court:

Company	Telecom regions	# of licenses	Remarks
Adonis Projects	Haryana, Himachal Pradesh, Jammu & Kashmir, Punjab, Rajasthan, Uttar Pradesh (East)	6	Adonis Projects, Nahan Properties, Aska Projects, Volga Properties, Azare Properties & Hudson Properties were acquired by Unitech. Since Unitech Infrastructure and Unitech Builders & Estates were subsidiaries of Unitech Group, in 2008 Unitech had 22 2G licenses. Later that year, Telenor bought a majority share in the telecom company from the Unitech Group and provided service as Uninor with 22 licences.
Nahan Properties	Assam, Bihar, North East, Odisha, Uttar Pradesh (east), West Bengal	6	Adonis Projects, Nahan Properties, Aska Projects, Volga Properties, Azare Properties & Hudson Properties were acquired by Unitech. Since Unitech Infrastructure and Unitech Builders & Estates were subsidiaries of Unitech Group, in 2008 Unitech had 22 2G licenses. Later that year, Telenor bought a majority share in the telecom company from the Unitech Group and provided service as Uninor with 22 licences.
Aska Projects	Andhra Pradesh, Kerala, Karnataka	3	Adonis Projects, Nahan Properties, Aska Projects, Volga Properties, Azare Properties & Hudson Properties were acquired by Unitech. Since Unitech Infrastructure and Unitech Builders & Estates were subsidiaries of Unitech Group, in 2008 Unitech had 22 2G licenses. Later that year, Telenor bought a majority share in the telecom company from the Unitech Group and provided service as Uninor with 22 licences.
Volga Properties	Gujarat, Madhya Pradesh, Maharashtra	3	Adonis Projects, Nahan Properties, Aska Projects, Volga Properties, Azare Properties & Hudson Properties were acquired by Unitech. Since Unitech Infrastructure and Unitech Builders & Estates were subsidiaries of Unitech Group, in 2008 Unitech had 22 2G licenses. Later that year, Telenor bought a majority share in the telecom company from the Unitech Group and provided service as Uninor with 22 licences.
Azure Properties	Kolkata	1	Adonis Projects, Nahan Properties, Aska Projects, Volga Properties, Azare Properties & Hudson Properties were acquired by Unitech. Since Unitech Infrastructure and Unitech Builders & Estates were subsidiaries of Unitech Group, in 2008 Unitech had 22 2G licenses. Later that year, Telenor bought a majority share in the telecom company from the Unitech Group and provided service as Uninor with 22 licences.
Hudson Properties	Delhi	1	Adonis Projects, Nahan Properties, Aska Projects, Volga Properties, Azare Properties & Hudson Properties were acquired by Unitech. Since Unitech Infrastructure and Unitech Builders & Estates were subsidiaries of Unitech Group, in 2008 Unitech had 22 2G licenses. Later that year, Telenor bought a majority share in the telecom company from the Unitech Group and provided service as Uninor with 22 licences.
Unitech Builders & Estates	Tamil Nadu (including Chennai)	1	Adonis Projects, Nahan Properties, Aska Projects, Volga Properties, Azare Properties & Hudson Properties were acquired by Unitech. Since Unitech Infrastructure and Unitech Builders & Estates were subsidiaries of Unitech Group, in 2008 Unitech had 22 2G licenses. Later that year, Telenor bought a majority share in the telecom company from the Unitech Group and provided service as Uninor with 22 licences.
Unitech Infrastructures	Mumbai	1	Adonis Projects, Nahan Properties, Aska Projects, Volga Properties, Azare Properties & Hudson Properties were acquired by Unitech. Since Unitech Infrastructure and Unitech Builders & Estates were subsidiaries of Unitech Group, in 2008 Unitech had 22 2G licenses. Later that year, Telenor bought a majority share in the telecom company from the Unitech Group and provided service as Uninor with 22 licences.
Loop Telecom	Bihar, Gujarat, Himachal Pradesh, Kerala, Kolkata, Punjab, Rajasthan, Uttar Pradesh, West Bengal, Andhra Pradesh, Delhi, Haryana, Karnataka, Maharashtra, Odisha, Tamil Nadu (including Chennai), Assam, Jammu & Kashmir, Madhya Pradesh	21	
Datacom Solutions	Andhra Pradesh, Assam, Bihar, Gujarat, Haryana, Himachal Pradesh, Jammu & Kashmir, Karnataka, Kerala, Kolkata, Madhya Pradesh, Maharashtra, Odisha, Rajasthan, Tamil Nadu (including Chennai), Uttar Pradesh, West Bengal, Delhi, Mumbai	21	Operates as Videocon Telecom
Shyam Telelink	Madhya Pradesh, Kerala, Kolkata, Punjab, Uttar Pradesh, West Bengal, Andhra Pradesh, Delhi, Haryana, Karnataka, Maharashtra, Odisha, Tamil Nadu (including Chennai), Assam, Jammu & Kashmir, North East	17	Shyam Telelink & Shyani Telelink have a combined 21 licenses. In late 2008 Russia-based Sistema bought a majority share in the company, which now operates as MTS India.
Shyani Telelink	Mumbai, Bihar, Gujarat, Himachal Pradesh	4	Shyam Telelink & Shyani Telelink have a combined 21 licenses. In late 2008 Russia-based Sistema bought a majority share in the company, which now operates as MTS India.
Swan Telecom	Andhra Pradesh, Gujarat, Haryana, Karnataka, Kerala, Maharashtra, Punjab, Rajasthan, Tamil Nadu (including Chennai), Uttar Pradesh, Delhi, Mumbai	13	Swan was a subsidiary of Reliance Telecom established to circumvent the one-company-one-license rule. In 2008, Swan merged with Allianz Infratech; late in the year Abu Dhabi's Etisalat bought about 45 percent of the company, renaming it Etisalat DB Telecom.
Allianz Infratech	Bihar, Madhya Pradesh	2	Swan was a subsidiary of Reliance Telecom established to circumvent the one-company-one-license rule. In 2008, Swan merged with Allianz Infratech; late in the year Abu Dhabi's Etisalat bought about 45 percent of the company, renaming it Etisalat DB Telecom.
Idea Cellular	Assam, Punjab, Karnataka, Jammu and Kashmir, North East, Kolkata, West Bengal, Odisha, Tamil Nadu (including Chennai)	9	Since Idea Cellular bought Spice Communications in 2008 for ₹27 billion (US$290 million), of the 122 spectrum licenses sold in 2008 Idea owns 13. Seven are in use by the company, and the remainder are overlapping licenses.
Spice Communications	Delhi, Andhra Pradesh, Haryana, Maharashtra	4	Since Idea Cellular bought Spice Communications in 2008 for ₹27 billion (US$290 million), of the 122 spectrum licenses sold in 2008 Idea owns 13. Seven are in use by the company, and the remainder are overlapping licenses.
S Tel	Assam, Jammu and Kashmir, Odisha, North East, Bihar, Himachal Pradesh	6	In January 2009, Bahrain Telecommunications agreed to buy 49 percent of S Tel for $225 million. Chinnakannan Sivasankaran owns the remaining share. In May 2009, Sahara Group bought an 11.7-percent share in S Tel.
Tata Teleservices	Jammu and Kashmir, Assam, North East	3	In late 2008 Tata sold a 26-percent share to the Japanese NTT DoCoMo for about ₹130.7 billion (US$1.4 billion), or an enterprise value of ₹502.69 billion (US$5.4 billion).

== Accused parties ==
The selling of the licenses drew attention to three groups: politicians and bureaucrats, who had the authority to sell licenses; corporations buying the licenses, and professionals who mediated between the politicians and corporations.

=== Politicians ===
The following charges were filed by the CBI and the Directorate General of Income Tax Investigation in the Special CBI Court.

==== A. Raja ====
- Political career: Four-time DMK member of Parliament (currently member of Lok Sabha from Nilgiris, Tamil Nadu), former Union Minister of State for Rural Development (1999) and Health and Family Welfare (2003), former Union Cabinet Minister for Environment and Forests (2004) and Communication and Information Technology (2007 and 2009)
- Allegation: A joint investigative report by the CBI and the Income Tax Department alleged that Raja may have received a ₹30 billion (US$320 million) bribe for moving the cut-off date for spectrum applications forward. The changed deadline eliminated many applications, enabling Raja to favour a few applicants. The agencies also alleged that he used accounts in his wife's name in Mauritius and Seychelles banks for the kickbacks. A CBI charge sheet alleged that Raja conspired with the accused and arbitrarily refined the first-come, first-served policy to ensure that Swan and Unitech received licences. Instead of auctioning 2G spectrum, he sold it at the 2001 rate.
- Charges: Criminal breach of trust by a public servant (section 409), criminal conspiracy (Section 120-B), cheating (Section 420) and forgery (Sections 468 and 471); booked under the Prevention of Corruption Act for accepting illegal gratification.
- Status: Arrested by the CBI on 2 February 2011. Applied for bail on 9 May 2012, which was granted on 15 May.

==== Kanimozhi ====
- Political career: Youngest Daughter of five-time Chief Minister of Tamil Nadu M. Karunanidhi. DMK member of Parliament, representing Tamil Nadu in the Rajya Sabha till 2019, currently member of Lok Sabha from Thoothukudi.
- Allegations: According to the CBI charge sheet, Kanimozhi owns 20 percent of family-owned Kalaignar TV; her stepmother, Dayalu Ammal, owns 60 percent of the channel. The CBI alleges that Kanimozhi was the "active brain" behind the channel and conspired with Raja to coerce DB Realty cofounder Shahid Balwa to funnel ₹2 billion (US$21 million) to Kalaignar TV. Kanimozhi was in regular contact with Raja about the launch of Kalaignar TV. Raja advanced the channel's cause, facilitating its registration with the Ministry of Information and Broadcasting and adding it to DTH operator TATA Sky's lineup. Kanimozhi was charged with tax evasion by the Income Tax Department in Chennai.
- Charges: Criminal conspiracy to cause criminal breach of trust by a public servant and criminal conspiracy (Section 120-B), cheating (Section 420) and forgery (Sections 468 and 471), and booked under the Prevention of Corruption Act.
- Status: Arrested by the CBI on 20 May 2011. Granted bail on 28 November 2011, after 188 days in custody. On 21 December 2017, she has been acquitted by a Special CBI Court.

=== Bureaucrats ===
A number of bureaucrats were named in the CBI charge sheet filed in its Special Court.

==== Siddharth Behura ====
- Position: Telecom Secretary when the licenses were granted.
- Allegations: According to the CBI charge sheet, Behura conspired with Raja and several others. When the application deadline time was declared, from 3:30 to 4:30 pm Behura closed counters to block other telecom companies.
- Charges: Criminal breach of trust by a public servant (Section 409), criminal conspiracy (Section 120-B), cheating (Section 420) and forgery (Sections 468 and 471); booked under the Prevention of Corruption Act for accepting illegal gratuities.
- Status: Arrested by the CBI on 2 February 2011 and granted bail on 9 May 2012, and finally acquitted on 21 December 2017 by a Special CBI Court for lack of convincing evidence. On 10 July 2012 joint parliamentary committee deposition, Behura blamed Raja for most of the decisions related to 2G spectrum auctions.

==== RK Chandolia ====
- Position: Raja's private secretary when the licenses were granted.
- Allegations: According to the CBI charge sheet Chandolia, like Behura, conspired with Raja and several others; when the application deadline time was declared from 3:30 to 4:30 pm, Chandolia joined Behura in shutting counters to physically block other telecom companies.
- Charges: Criminal conspiracy to cause criminal breach of trust by a public servant, criminal conspiracy (Section 120 B), cheating (Section 420) and forgery (Sections 468 and 471); booked under the Prevention of Corruption Act
- Status: Arrested by the CBI on 2 February 2011. Although he was granted bail by the special CBI court on 1 December 2011, the following day the High Court took suo motu notice of newspaper reports of the bail and stayed it. Chandolia appealed to the Supreme Court, and on 9 May 2012 the court upheld the bail grant. He was acquitted on 21 December 2017 by a Special CBI Court for lack of substantial evidence.

=== Executives ===
A number of executives were accused in the CBI charge sheet.

==== Sanjay Chandra ====
- Position: Former Unitech Wireless managing director
- Charges: Criminal conspiracy to cause criminal breach of trust by a public servant, criminal conspiracy (Section 120-B), cheating (Section 420) and forgery (Sections 468 and 471); booked under the Prevention of Corruption Act
- Allegations: Former CBI prosecutor AK Singh was implicated in a taped conversation sharing legal strategy and privileged information with Chandra.
- Status: Arrested by the CBI on 20 April 2011 and granted bail on 24 November, As of 21 December 2017 he has been acquitted by a special CBI Court.

==== Umashankar ====
- Charges: Criminal conspiracy to cause criminal breach of trust by a public servant, criminal conspiracy (Section 120-B), cheating (Section 420) and forgery (Sections 468 and 471); booked under the Prevention of Corruption Act
- Allegations: Former CBI prosecutor AK Singh was implicated in a taped conversation sharing legal strategy and privileged information with Umashankar.
- Status: Arrested by the CBI on 20 April 2008 and granted bail same day. As of 21 December 2017 he has been acquitted by a special CBI Court.

==== Gautam Doshi ====
- Position: Managing director, Reliance Anil Dhirubhai Ambani Group
- Charges: Criminal conspiracy to cause criminal breach of trust by a public servant, criminal conspiracy (Section 120-B), cheating (Section 420) and forgery (Sections 468 and 471); booked under the Prevention of Corruption Act
- Status: Arrested by the CBI on 20 April 2011 and granted bail on 24 November 2011. As of 21 December 2017 he has been acquitted by a special CBI Court.

==== Hari Nair ====
- Position: Senior vice-president, Reliance Anil Dhirubhai Ambani Group
- Charges: Criminal conspiracy to cause criminal breach of trust by a public servant, criminal conspiracy (Section 120-B), cheating (Section 420) and forgery (Sections 468 and 471); booked under the Prevention of Corruption Act
- Status: Arrested by the CBI on 20 April 2011 and granted bail on 24 November 2011. As of 21 December 2017 he has been acquitted by a special CBI Court.

==== Surendra Pipara ====
- Position: Senior vice-president, Reliance Anil Dhirubhai Ambani Group
- Charges: Criminal conspiracy to cause criminal breach of trust by a public servant, criminal conspiracy (Section 120-B), cheating (Section 420) and forgery (Sections 468 and 471); booked under the Prevention of Corruption Act
- Status: Arrested by the CBI on 20 April 2011 and granted bail on 24 November 2011. As of 21 December 2017 he has been acquitted by a special CBI Court.

==== Vinod Goenka ====
- Position: Managing director, DB Realty and Swan Telecom
- Charges: Criminal conspiracy to cause criminal breach of trust by a public servant criminal conspiracy (Section 120 B), cheating (Section 420), forgery (Sections 468 and 471) and fabrication of evidence (Section 193); booked under the Prevention of Corruption Act
- Status: Arrested by the CBI on 20 April 2011 and granted bail on 24 November 2011. As of 21 December 2017 he has been acquitted by a special CBI Court.

==== Shahid Balwa ====
- Position: Corporate promoter, DB Realty and Swan Telecom
- Charges: Criminal conspiracy to cause criminal breach of trust by a public servant, criminal conspiracy (Section 120-B), cheating (Section 420), forgery (Sections 468 and 471) and fabrication of evidence (Section 193); booked under the Prevention of Corruption Act
- Status: Arrested by the CBI on 8 February 2011 and granted bail on 29 November 2011, acquitted on 21 December 2017 by a special CBI Court.

==== Asif Balwa ====
- Position: Director, Kusegaon Fruits and Vegetables
- Charges: Criminal conspiracy to cause criminal breach of trust by a public servant, criminal conspiracy (Section 120-B), cheating (Section 420), forgery (Sections 468 and 471) and fabrication of evidence (Section 193); booked under the Prevention of Corruption Act
- Status: Arrested by the CBI on 29 March 2011 and granted bail on 28 November 2011 Acquitted on 21 December 2017 by a special CBI Court.

==== Rajiv Agarwal ====
- Position: Director, Kusegaon Fruits and Vegetables
- Charges: Criminal conspiracy to cause criminal breach of trust by a public servant, criminal conspiracy (Section 120-B), cheating (Section 420), forgery (Sections 468 and 471) and fabrication of evidence (Section 193); booked under the Prevention of Corruption Act
- Status: Arrested by the CBI on 29 March 2011 and granted bail on 28 November 2011. Acquitted on 21 December 2017 by a special CBI Court.

==== Sharath Kumar ====
- Position: Managing director, Kalaignar TV
- Charges: Criminal conspiracy to cause criminal breach of trust by a public servant, criminal conspiracy (Section 120-B), cheating (Section 420), forgery (Sections 468 and 471) and fabrication of evidence (Section 193); booked under the Prevention of Corruption Act
- Status: Arrested by the CBI on 20 May 2011 and granted bail on 28 November 2011. Acquitted on 21 December 2017 by a special CBI Court.

==== Ravi Ruia ====
- Position: Vice-chair, Essar Group
- Charges: Criminal conspiracy (Section 120 B) and cheating (Section 420)
- Status: Acquitted on 21 December 2017 by a special CBI Court.

==== Anshuman Ruia ====
- Position: Director, Essar Group
- Charges: Criminal conspiracy (Section 120 B) and cheating (Section 420).
- Status: Acquitted on 21 December 2017 by a special CBI Court.

==== Vikas Saraf ====
- Position: Director of strategy and planning, Essar Group
- Charges: Criminal conspiracy (Section 120 B) and cheating (Section 420 of the Indian Penal Code)
- Status: Acquitted on 21 December 2017 by a special CBI Court.

==== Ishwari Prasad Khaitan ====
- Position: Corporate promoter, Loop Telecom
- Charges: Criminal conspiracy under (Section 120 B) and cheating (Section 420)
- Status: Acquitted on 21 December 2017 by a special CBI Court.

==== Kiran Khaitan ====
- Position: Corporate promoter, Loop Telecom
- Charges: Criminal conspiracy (Section 120 B) and cheating (Section 420)
- Status: Acquitted on 21 December 2017 by a special CBI Court.

==== Karim Morani ====
- Position: Corporate promoter and director, Cineyug Films
- Allegations: According to the Income Tax Department charge sheet, Morani-owned Cineyug Films was a part of the route used by Shahid Balwa to funnel ₹2 billion (US$21 million) illegally to Kalaignar TV. DB Realty corporate promoters Shahid Balwa and Vinod Goenka transferred ₹2,092.5 million (US$22 million) to Kusegaon Fruits and Vegetables, where Balwa's younger brother Asif was a director. Kusegaon then transferred ₹2 billion (US$21 million) to Cineyug Films, and Morani transferred it to Kalaignar TV.
- Charges: Criminal conspiracy to cause criminal breach of trust by a public servant, criminal conspiracy (Section 120-B), cheating (Section 420), forgery (Sections 468 and 471) and fabrication of evidence (Section 193); booked under the Prevention of Corruption Act
- Status: Arrested by the CBI on 30 May 2011 and granted bail on 28 November 2011. Promptly acquitted on 29 December 2017 by a "special CBI Court".

=== Corporations ===
Several companies were named in the CBI charge sheet.

==== Unitech Wireless ====
- Charges: Criminal conspiracy to cause criminal breach of trust by a public servant, criminal conspiracy (Section 120-B), cheating (Section 420) and forgery (Sections 468 and 471)
- Status: The company was acquitted on 21 December 2017 of any wrongdoing by Special CBI Court.

==== Reliance Telecom ====
- Charges: Criminal conspiracy to cause criminal breach of trust by a public servant, criminal conspiracy (Section 120-B) and cheating (Section 420)
- Status: As of December 2017, acquitted in 2G spectrum case.

==== Swan Telecom ====
- Charges: Criminal conspiracy to cause criminal breach of trust by a public servant, criminal conspiracy (Section 120-B) and cheating (Section 420)
- Status: The company was acquitted on 21 December 2017 of any wrongdoing by a Special CBI Court that was appointed for the purpose of acquitting the accused.

=== Media role ===
OPEN and Outlook reported that journalists Barkha Dutt (editor of NDTV) and Vir Sanghvi (editorial director of the Hindustan Times) knew that corporate lobbyist Nira Radia influenced Raja's appointment as telecom minister, publicising Radia's phone conversations with Dutt and Sanghvi when Radia's phone was tapped by the Income Tax Department. According to critics, Dutt and Sanghvi knew about the link between the government and the media industry but delayed reporting the corruption.

== Chronology ==
The Centre for Public Interest Litigation filed the first petition against the Union of India for irregularities in awarding 2G spectrum licenses. The petition alleged that the government lost $15.53 billion by issuing spectrum in 2008 based on 2001 prices, and by not following a competitive bidding process. This led to further petitions, and an investigation began in 2010.

=== 2007 ===
- May: A Raja becomes Telecom Minister.
- August: Allotment of 2G spectrum and Universal Access Service (UAS) licences by the Department of Telecommunications (DoT) begins.
- 25 September: The Telecom Ministry issues a press release that its deadline for application is 1 October.
- 1 October: DoT receives 575 applications for UAS licences from 46 companies.
- 2 November: The prime minister writes to Raja, directing him to ensure the allotment of 2G spectrum in a fair and transparent manner and to ensure that the licence fee was revised. Raja rejects many of the prime minister's recommendations.
- 22 November: In a letter to the DoT, the Finance Ministry raises procedural concerns. Its demand for a review is rejected.

=== 2008 ===
- 10 January: The DoT decides to issue licences on first-come, first-served basis, advancing the cut-off date from 1 October to 25 September and announcing on its website that those applying between 3.30 and 4.30 pm would be granted licences in accordance with policy.
- Total collection from sale of 122 licenses was about 92 billion.
- Swan Telecom, Unitech and Tata Teleservices sell shares at much higher prices to Etisalat, Telenor and DoCoMo, respectively.

=== 2009 ===
- 4 May: A telecom-watchdog NGO files a complaint with the Central Vigilance Commission (CVC) on illegalities in spectrum allocation to Loop Telecom.
- 19 May: Another complaint is filed with the CVC by Arun Agarwal, highlighting the low-cost spectrum grant to Swan Telecom. The CVC directs the CBI to investigate irregularities in the allocation of 2G spectrum.
- 1 July: Responding to a petition from S-Tel, the Delhi High Court rules the advancement of the cut-off date illegal.
- 20 October: The CBI registers a case, filing a First Information Report against unknown officers of the DoT and unknown private persons and companies under provisions of the Indian Penal Code and the Prevention of Corruption Act.
- 22 October: The Directorate General of Income Tax Investigation raids DoT offices.
- 16 November: The CBI investigates a wiretapped conversation by corporate lobbyist Nira Radia to learn the involvement of middlemen in the grant of spectrum to telecom companies, seeking information from the Directorate General of Income Tax Investigation about Radia and her company.

=== 2010 ===
- 13 March: The Supreme Court upholds the Delhi High Court ruling that the cutoff-date advancement was illegal.
- 31 March: According to the Comptroller and Auditor General, there were large-scale irregularities in spectrum allocation.
- 2 April: CBI Deputy Inspector General of Investigations Vineet Agarwal and Indian Revenue Service Director General of Income Tax Investigations Milap Jain, who were investigating the case, are transferred; Jain becomes Director General of International Taxation.
- 6 May: Telephone conversation between Raja and Niira Radia, recorded by the Directorate General of Income Tax Investigation, made public. The Centre for Public Interest Litigation petitions the Delhi High Court for a special investigation of the case.
- 25 May: Petition dismissed by the court.
- August: Dismissal appealed to the Supreme Court.
- 18 August: High Court refuses to order the prime minister to rule on a request by Janata Party chief Subramanian Swamy to prosecute Raja.
- 13 September: The Supreme Court asks the government and Raja to reply within 10 days to three petitions filed by the CPIL and others alleging a ₹70,000 crore (US$7.5 billion) scam in granting telecom licences in 2008.
- 24 September: Swamy petitions the Supreme Court to order the PM to prosecute Raja.
- 27 September: The Directorate General of Income Tax Investigation informs the Supreme Court of a probe of firms suspected to have violated the Foreign Exchange Management Act, saying it cannot confirm or deny Raja's involvement.
- 8 October: The Supreme Court asks the government to respond to the Comptroller and Auditor General report about the case.
- 21 October: Draft reports from the CAG are presented to the Supreme Court.
- 29 October: The Supreme Court criticises the CBI for its slowness in investigating the case.
- 10 November: The CAG submits a report on 2G spectrum to the government, stating a loss of ₹176,000 crore (US$19 billion) to the exchequer.
- 11 November: The DoT files a Supreme Court affidavit that the CAG lacked the authority to question the 2008 policy decision.
- 14 November: Raja resigns as telecom minister.
- 15 November: Kapil Sibal placed in charge of Telecom Ministry.
- 20 November: Affidavit on behalf of the PM filed in Supreme Court rejecting the charge of inaction on Swamy's complaint.
- 22 November: The CBI and the Directorate General of Income Tax Investigation tell the SC they will file a charge sheet within three months, and the CBI says it will investigate the role of Niira Radia.
- 24 November: The SC reserves verdict on Swamy's request to the PM to prosecute Raja.
- 25 November: The SC criticises the CBI for not questioning Raja.
- 29 November: The CBI files a status report on the probe.
- 30 November: The SC questions the Central Vigilance Commission's P. J. Thomas' fitness to supervise the CBI probe, since he was Telecom Secretary at that time.
- 1 December: The SC orders the original tapes of conversations by Radia. Raja questions the CAG findings.
- 2 December: The government supplies Directorate General of Income Tax Investigation tapes to the SC, which criticises Raja for ignoring the PM's advice to delay the spectrum allocation.
- 8 December: SC favours including 2001 (when first-come, first-served was the norm for spectrum allocation) in the probe period and asks the government to consider a special court. The Directorate General of Income Tax Investigation reports a money trail covering 10 countries, including Mauritius.
- 14 December: PIL filed in SC, seeking the cancellation of new telecom licences and 2G spectrum allocated under Raja.
- 15 December: Swamy petitions a Delhi court for his inclusion as a public prosecutor, saying Raja favoured "ineligible" companies Swan Telecom and Unitech Wireless in allocating spectrum.
- 16 December: The SC decides to monitor the CBI inquiry.

=== 2011 ===
- 4 January: Swamy petitions the SC for cancellation of the licenses.
- 10 January: Supreme Court notifies the government of Swamy's petition, and issues notices to 11 companies which allegedly did not fulfill the roll-out obligations or were ineligible.
- 30 January: The government's decision to regularise the licenses of companies which failed to meet the deadline is challenged in the Supreme Court.
- 2 February: Raja, former Telecom Secretary Siddharth Behura and Raja's former personal secretary, R. K. Chandolia, are arrested.
- 8 February: Raja is remanded to two more days of CBI custody, and Behura and Chandolia are placed in judicial custody. Swan Telecom corporate promoter Shahid Usman Balwa is arrested.
- 10 February: The Supreme Court asks the CBI to investigate corporations which were beneficiaries of the spectrum allocation. Raja and Balwa are remanded to CBI custody for four more days by a special CBI court.
- 14 February: Raja's custody is extended by three days, and Balwa's for four.
- 17 February: Raja is sent to Tihar Jail under judicial custody.
- 18 February: The Directorate General of Income Tax Investigation questions Kani Mozhi at its Chennai headquarters.
- 25 February: The Directorate General of Income Tax Investigation tells a Delhi court that Balwa facilitated transactions to Kalaignar TV.
- 28 February: Raja requests video-conferenced judicial proceedings, saying that he is threatened by other inmates.
- 1 March: The CBI tells the SC that 63 people are under investigation. Raja appears in CBI court via video-conference.
- 11 March: The Delhi High Court establishes a special court. Balwa is also allowed to appear via video-conference.
- 17 March: The SC reserves judgment on licence cancellations, rejecting corporate claims that estoppel cannot be applied to protect illegality.
- 29 March: The SC allows the CBI to file its chargesheet on 2 April instead of 31 March. Asif Balwa and Rajeev Agarwal are arrested.
- 2 April: The CBI files its first chargesheet.
- 25 April: The CBI files a second chargesheet, and Kanimozhi, Sharad Kumar and Karim Morani are summoned.
- 6 May: Kanimozhi and Sharad Kumar appear, requesting bail, and Morani requests an appearance exemption on medical grounds. The SC issues a contempt of court notice to Sahara India Pariwar managing director Subrata Roy and two others for alleged interference in the Directorate General of Economic Enforcement investigation.
- 7 May: The special CBI court reserves judgment on Kanimozhi and Kumar's bail requests.
- 14 May: The special CBI court postpones judgment on the bail pleas for 20 May.
- 20 May: The special court refuses Kanimozhi and Kumar's bail requests, ordering their arrest to prevent witness-tampering.
- 8 June: Delhi HC judge Ajit Bharihoke again refuses bail Kanimozhi and Kumar's bail requests.
- 20 June: The SC refuses Kanimozhi's bail request.
- 25 July: Arguments begin, with Raja wanting to summon the prime minister and former finance minister P. Chidambaram as witnesses.
- 26 August: The special CBI court allows Subramanian Swamy to argue his own case, primarily to address possible loopholes in its investigation.
- 30 August: The Directorate General of Income Tax Investigation freezes accounts and attaches properties worth ₹223 crore (US$24 million) belonging to five companies (primarily related to DB Realty under the Prevention of Money Laundering Act (PMLA)).
- 1 September: The Enforcement Directorate files a status report in Supreme Court of a Foreign Exchange Management Act violation of ₹ 100 billion.
- 15 September: Swamy requests that P. Chidambaram should be charged.
- 22 September: The CBI defends Chidambaram in the SC, blaming the DoT.
- 26 September: The CBI requests criminal-breach-of-trust charges for Raja, Chandolia and Behura.
- 19 October: The CBI files a First Information Report against Maran and his brother in the Aircel-Maxis deal.
- 10 October: The SC reserves judgment on Swamy's request for a probe of Home Minister Chidambaram's role in the matter. The CBI arrests former telecom minister and DMK leader Dayanidhi Maran and his brother, Kalanithi Maran.
- 22 October: The special CBI court finds prima facie evidence to try the 17 accused (including Raja) on charges including criminal conspiracy, breach of trust, cheating and forgery.
- 3 November: The special CBI court dismisses bail requests of all eight applicants, including Kanimozhi.
- 8 November: The special court orders CBI to provide Swamy with copies of files on equity sales by telecom companies in its investigation of P. Chidambaram's involvement.
- 9 November: The Delhi HC refuses bail to Karim Morani on health grounds, promising a ruling to the CBI on five other bail requests by 1 December.
- 11 November: Trial of the 17 accused begins in the Patiala House special CBI court.
- 14 November: The United Progressive Alliance government asks the SC to restrain Swamy from publicly accusing the UPA leadership, especially Home Minister P Chidambaram and UPA chair Sonia Gandhi.
- 22 November: The special court moves the trial to the Tihar jail, after a Delhi high-court order.
- 23 November: The SC grants bail to five corporate executives: Sanjay Chandra of Unitech Wireless, Vinod Goenka of Swan Telecom and the Reliance Group's Gautam Doshi, Surendra Pipara and Hari Nayar.
- 28 November: The Delhi High Court grants bail to DMK MP Kanimozhi and four others: Karim Morani, Sharad Kumar, Asif Balwa and Rajeev Agarwal, upholding the principle of parity under Section 144 of the Constitution of India in a SC order.
- 29 November: The special court grants bail to Shahid Balwa, citing the principle of parity; the SC and HC had granted bail to 10 other accused parties.
- 1 December: The special court grants bail to Raja's former private secretary, R. K. Chandolia, ordering him not to visit the DoT without prior court permission.
- 2 December: Claiming suo motu, the HC stays trial-court bail granted to R. K. Chandolia.
- 7 December: The SC stays the HC's suo motu order against Chandolia's bail request.
- 8 December: The special CBI court accepts Swamy's request to summon Chidambaram as a witness and question two witnesses: senior CBI and Finance Ministry officials.
- 12 December: The CBI files a third chargesheet, naming Essar Group corporate promoters Ravi Ruia, his son Anshuman Ruia and its director of strategy and planning, Vikas Saraf, and Loop Telecom promoters Kiran Khaitan and her husband, I P Khaitan. It also charges Loop Mobile India, its subsidiary Loop Telecom and Essar Tele Holding.
- 16 December: The HC rejects the bail request of Siddharth Behura: "He was the 'perpetrator' of the illegal designs of Raja and would not claim benefit of parity with 10 others released on bail".

=== 2012 ===
- 2 February: The Supreme Court cancels the 122 licenses issued by Raja and imposes a ₹50 million ($1,018,122) fine on Unitech, Swan and Tata Teleservices and a ₹5 million fine on Loop Telecom Pvt Ltd, S-Tel, Allianz Infratech and Sistema Shyam Tele Services. The SC requested a trial-court ruling about whether Home Minister P Chidambaram should be charged.
- 4 February: The special court, under justice O.P Saini, dismisses Swamy's request to charge Chidambaram.
- 8 February: The Enforcement Directorate and the Directorate General of Income Tax Investigation charge DMK leader Dayanidhi Maran with money laundering and his brother, Kalanithi Maran, for allegedly receiving about ₹ 5.5 billion illegally in the Aircel-Maxis deal.
- 9 February: Essar Group and Loop Telecom appeal their special-court subpoenas to the Supreme Court.
- 15 February: The Supreme Court refuses an interim stay on the 22 February summonses of Essar Group, Loop Telecom and their officials by the special court.
- 22 February: The CBI files a complaint with the CVC about witness-tampering by the Directorate General of Income Tax Investigation, allegedly at the behest of DMK Minister of State for Finance SS Palanimanickam. Swamy said he would notify the Supreme Court.
- 23 February: Swamy petitions the Supreme Court to overturn the trial-court dismissal of his request to charge Union Home Minister P. Chidambaram.
- 2 March: The government of India files a review petition in Supreme Court of the court's 2 February order cancelling the 122 licenses, questioning the court's authority to supersede the first-come, first-served policy but not challenging the validity of the cancellations. Raja and Sistema (majority shareholder in MTS India, Uninor and other telecom companies) also file a SC review petition.
- 4 April: Except for the government of India's partial review petition, the Supreme Court dismisses all 10 review petitions. Companies dismissed include Videocon Telecommunications, S Tel, Sistema Shyam Teleservices, Tata Teleservices, Unitech Wireless (Tamil Nadu), Etisalat DB Telecom and Idea Cellular.
- 12 April: The government requests an advisory opinion from the Supreme Court on issues arising from its 2 February ruling.
- 9 May: The Supreme Court grants bail to Siddharth Behura; and upheld RK Chandolia's bail. Raja requests bail.
- 15 May: Bail granted to Raja after 15 months, on condition that he have court permission to visit Tamil Nadu.
- 6 June: The special court allows Raja to visit Tamil Nadu.
- 3 July: Briefing the joint parliamentary committee probing the case, the Enforcement Directorate said it has enough evidence to convict DMK chief Karunanidhi's wife and daughter, Kanimozhi.
- 31 July: Former DoT senior official A. K. Srivastava confirmed the CBI's allegation in his testimony, and Raja (as telecom minister) was the final authority on policy matters. In an earlier statement to CBI, he said that Raja had recorded the cut—off date of 1 October 2007 in a DoT file.
- 1 August: The Supreme Court, in its advisory opinion on the 2G judgment, says that the implementation of the first-come, first-served policy was flawed. According to the Chief Justice, "The moment you change the criterion and distort the policy, it ceases to be FCFS policy. If you insist on making payment at the last minute after changing the cut-off date, then it is not FCFS, it is an out-of-turn policy."
- 3 August: In accordance with a Supreme Court directive, the government of India revises the spectrum value to ₹140 billion (US$1.5 billion); this discredits the zero-loss theory and illustrates the ₹1,760 billion (US$19 billion) revenue loss calculated by the CAG.
- 9 August: The government again requests an extension from the Supreme Court (this time to 12 November) of the deadline to begin auctioning spectrum licences. After cancelling 122 licences in February, the court had given it four months to re-auction them (which had been extended to 31 August).
- 11 November: After one year of trial, 77 of 154 witnesses have been deposed.

=== 2013 ===
- 20 April: Communist Party of India senior MP Gurudas Dasgupta accuses Manmohan Singh of "dereliction of duty", alleging that the PM was aware of irregularities in the allocation of telecom licences. According to Dasgupta, in a November 2007 letter Kamal Nath advised the Prime Minister to establish a group of ministers to allocate spectrum. He also referred to a note from the Cabinet Secretary recommending that the assessed value of spectrum licences be increased.
- 23 April: In a 112-page written statement to the joint parliamentary committee, Raja said that he met with P. Chidambaram and Prime Minister Singh several times from November 2007 to July 2008 to inform them of all 2G-related decisions and Singh agreed with him.

=== 2017 ===
- 21 December: A special CBI court acquits everyone accused in the 2G spectrum case stating that the prosecution has failed to prove any charge against any of the accused, made in its well choreographed charge sheet.

=== 2018 ===
- 19 and 20 March 2018: The Enforcement Directorate and CBI respectively file appeals against trial court verdict in the Delhi High Court.

=== 2019 ===
- Feb 2019: Justice Najmi Waziri ordered the defendants to plant 3,000 trees each for seeking more time to file their responses on the appeal challenging their acquittal in the case.

=== 2020 ===
- 5 October 2020: The Delhi High Court begins day-to-day hearings on the appeals, which later gets postponed to 14 January 2021.
- 23 November 2020: Justice Brijesh Sethi of Delhi High Court passed an order to release the appeals before him as "part-heard" to another judge as he was due to retire on 30 November 2020. The judge mentioned with heavy heart that his limited time was consumed in hearing and disposal of miscellaneous applications and petitions which were filed one after another on behalf of the respondents and hence he could not hear and decide the CBI and EDs appeals. All the petitions of the respondents (to the CBI and ED's petitions) were dismissed.

=== 2022 ===
- 3 March 2022: Supreme Court's three-judge bench of Justices DY Chandrachud, Surya Kant and Vikram Nath rejects Loop Telecom's petition seeking refund of Rs 1,454.94 Crore paid as entry fee for 2G spectrum licences that were quashed on 2 February 2012 by the Supreme Court. Loop Telecom had sought refund of entry fee as its promoters had been acquitted by the trial court judgement on 21 December 2017. The Supreme Court rejected this argument and mentioned that, “The process leading up to the award of the UASLs (Unified Access Service Licences) and the allocation of the 2G spectrum was found to be arbitrary and constitutionally infirm” and “the need for an open and transparent bidding process for the allocation of natural resources was substituted by a process which was designed to confer unlawful benefits on a group of selected bidders by which the appellant benefitted”.

=== 2023 ===
- 13 April 2023: The Bar & Bench notes that after 5 years, 95 listings and 7 judges in the Delhi High Court, the CBI and the ED's appeals are yet to cross the stage of leave to appeal.

=== 2024 ===
- 22 March 2024: Delhi High Court's single-judge bench of Justice Dinesh Kumar Sharma agrees that the trial court's judgement requires deeper examination and re-appreciation of entire evidence and admits CBI's appeal. The court posts the case to 20 May for detailed arguments.

== Licence cancellations ==
On 2 February 2012 the Supreme Court ruled on petitions filed by Subramanian Swamy and the Centre for Public Interest Litigation (CPIL) represented by Prashant Bhushan, challenging the 2008 allotment of 2G licenses, cancelling all 122 spectrum licences granted during Raja's term as communications minister. and described the allocation of 2G spectrum as "unconstitutional and arbitrary". The bench of GS Singhvi and Asok Kumar Ganguly imposed a fine of ₹50 million (US$530,000) on Unitech Wireless, Swan Telecom and Tata Teleservices and a ₹5 million (US$53,000) fine on Loop Telecom, S Tel, Allianz Infratech and Sistema Shyam Tele Services. According to the ruling the current licences would remain in place for four months, after which time the government would reissue the licences.

In its ruling the court said that former telecom minister A. Raja "wanted to favour some companies at the cost of the public exchequer", listing seven steps he took to ensure this:

1. After becoming telecom minister, Raja directed that all applications for spectrum licences would be held pending Telecom Regulatory Authority of India recommendations.
2. The 28 August 2007 TRAI recommendations were not presented to the full Telecom Commission, which would have included the finance secretary. Although the TRAI recommendations for allocation of 2G spectrum had serious financial implications (and finance ministry input was required under the Government of India Transaction of Business Rules, 1961), Telecom Commission non-permanent members were not notified of the meeting.
3. The DoT officers attending 10 October 2007 Telecom Commission meeting were coerced into approving the TRAI recommendations, or they would have "incurred" Raja's "wrath".
4. Since the Cabinet had approved the Group of Ministers recommendations, the DoT had to discuss the issue of spectrum pricing with the finance ministry. However, Raja did not consult the finance minister or other officials because the finance secretary had objected to allocating 2G spectrum at 2001 rates.
5. Raja dismissed the law minister's suggestion that the issue should be presented to the Group of Ministers. After receiving the PM's 2 November 2007 letter suggesting transparency in spectrum allocation of the spectrum, Raja said it would be unfair, discriminatory, arbitrary and capricious to auction spectrum to new applicants because it would not give them a level playing field. Although a 24 September DoT press release said that 1 October would be the application deadline, he changed the deadline to 25 September. Raja's arbitrary action, "though appear[ing] to be innocuous was actually intended to benefit some of the real estate firms who did not have any experience in dealing with telecom services and who had made applications only on 24 September 2007, i.e. one day before the cut-off date fixed by the C&IT minister on his own".
6. The 25 September cut-off date decided by Raja on 2 November was not made public until a 10 January 2008 press release in which he changed the first-come, first-served principle which had been in operation since 2003. "This enabled some of the applicants, who had access either to the minister or DoT officers, get bank drafts prepared towards performance guarantee of about Rs 16 billion".
7. "The manner in which the exercise for grant of LoIs to the applicants was conducted on 10 January 2008 leaves no room for doubt that everything was stage managed to favour those who were able to know in advance change in the implementation of the first-come-first-served policy." As a result, some companies who had submitted applications in 2004 or 2006 were pushed down the list in favour of those who had applied in August and September 2007.

=== Companies affected by cancellations ===
The table below lists the companies whose license were cancelled.

Company	Parent company	# of licences cancelled
Uninor	Joint venture of Unitech Group of India and Telenor of Norway Unitech Group	22
Sistema Shyam TeleServices Limited, now MTS India	Joint venture of the Shyam Group of India and Sistema of Russia	21
Loop Mobile (formerly BPL Mobile)	Khaitan Holding Group	21
Videocon Telecom	Videocon	21
Etisalat-DB	Joint venture of Swan Telecom of India and Etisalat of the UAE	15
Idea Cellular	Aditya Birla Group (49.05%), Axiata (Malaysia, 15%) & Providence Equity Partners (U.S., 10.6%)	13
S Tel	Joint venture of C Sivasankaran of India and Batelco of Bahrain. After the Supreme Court ruling, Batelco sold its 42.7% share to Sivasankaran-owned Sky City Foundation for 65.8 million Bahraini dinar ($174.5 million).	6
Tata Teleservices	Tata Group	3

=== Aftermath ===
In addition to Batelco's exit, on 21 February 2012 Telenor (the majority shareholder in Uninor) terminated its agreement with Unitech and sued it for "indemnity and compensation". On 23 February 2012, Etisalat of Etasalat-DB Telecom sued DB Realty corporate promoters Shahid Balwa and Vinod Goenka for fraud and misrepresentation.

After the special CBI court verdict on 21 December 2017 acquitting all the accused, the government faces compensation claims worth over Rs 170 billion from telcos like Videocon Telecom, Loop Telecom and STel who suffered loss of business after the Supreme Court scrapped 122 licences in 2012.

== Aircel-Maxis deal controversy ==
The controversy surrounding Aircel and Malaysia's Maxis Communications began in 2011 when Aircel founder C. Sivasankaran filed a complaint with the Central Bureau of Investigation and accused then-telecom minister Dayanidhi Maran of forcing him to sell Aircel to Maxis and delaying necessary 2G telecom licences in 2006 until the sale was completed. Investigations by the CBI and Enforcement Directorate later led to charges of corruption and money laundering against the Maran brothers and others. The case later expanded to include allegations that former finance minister P. Chidambaram and his son Karti Chidambaram delayed foreign investment approval linked to the deal, and they were named as accused in a 2018 CBI supplementary chargesheet.

== Response to the allegations ==
When Indian media began citing the CAG report identifying the loss at ₹ 1.76 trillion (short scale), the Indian opposition parties unanimously demanded the formation of a joint parliamentary committee to investigate the allegations. Although the government rejected their demand, when the winter session of Parliament began on 9 November 2010 the opposition again pressed for a JPC; again, their demand was rejected. The demand for a JPC gained further momentum when the CAG report was tabled in Parliament on 16 November 2010. The opposition blocked the proceedings, again pressing for a JPC; the government again rejected their demand, creating an impasse. Speaker of the Lok Sabha Meira Kumar unsuccessfully attempted to resolve the impasse. The winter session of Parliament concluded on 13 December 2010. Although 22 new bills were planned to be introduced, 23 pending bills passed and three bills withdrawn, Parliament functioned for only nine hours. On 22 February 2011, after resisting opposition demands for over three months, the government announced that it would form a JPC. The JPC criticised the CBI for its leniency to the PM, the Attorney General, Dayanidhi Maran and Chidambaram and its reluctance to investigate their roles on 24 July 2012. After questioning former telecom minister Dayanidhi Maran, his brother Kalanithi and the head of Maxis Communications, the CBI alleged that the Maran brothers accrued an illegal ₹ 5.50 billion by the sale of Sun Direct TV shares at highly "inflated prices".

In early November 2010 Jayalalithaa accused state chief minister M Karunanidhi of protecting Raja from corruption charges, calling for Raja's resignation. By mid-November, Raja resigned. At that time, comptroller Vinod Rai issued show-cause notices to Unitech, S Tel, Loop Mobile, Datacom (Videocon) and Etisalat to respond to his assertion that the 85 licenses granted to these companies did not have the capital required at application or were otherwise illegal. It was speculated that because these companies provide some consumer service, they would receive large fines but retain their licenses.

In June 2011 Prime Minister Manmohan Singh criticised the CAG for commenting on policy issues, warning it "to limit the office to the role defined in the constitution." After Singh's criticism the CAG conducted a "rigorous internal appraisal" and stood by its findings, citing additional events as corroboration. The CAG reiterated that there was "an undeniable loss to the exchequer", the calculation of which was based on three estimates: the 3G auctions and the Swan and Unitech transactions. It cited the Supreme Court ruling of 2 February 2012 that the actions of Raja and officers at the Department of Telecom were "wholly arbitrary, capricious and contrary to the public interest, apart from being violative of the doctrine of equality. The material produced for the quote showed that the Minister for C&IT wanted to favour some companies at the cost of the public exchequer." It said its estimate of loss of 1.76 trillion was justified, since the May 2012 TRAI collation of reserve prices for 2G spectrum was about the same as that in the November 2010 CAG report. TRAI had recommended a reserve price for 2G spectrum of ₹ 180 billion for a pan-India 5 MHz licence, higher than the 3G value of ₹ 167.50 billion for 5 MHz used by the CAG for arriving at a loss figure of ₹ 1,760 billion. It concluded that it was only examining the "implementation of policy", and policy-making was the government's prerogative.

== Joint parliamentary committee ==
The JPC consisted of half United Progressive Alliance members and half opposition members. Twelve were from the Lok Sabha, and eight from the Rajya Sabha. Of the Lok Sabha MPs, eight were from the Congress Party and four from the BJP. The following JPC members investigated the 2G allegations:

Name	Party
Kishore Chandra Deo	Congress
Paban Singh Ghatowar	Congress
Jai Prakash Agarwal	Congress
Deepender Singh Hooda	Congress
P. C. Chacko	Congress
Manish Tewari	Congress
Nirmal Khatri	Congress
Adhir Ranjan Chowdhury	Congress
T. R. Baalu	Dravida Munnetra Kazhagam
Kalyan Banerjee	Trinamool Congress
Jaswant Singh	BJP
Yashwant Sinha	BJP
Harin Pathak	BJP
Gopinath Munde	BJP
Sharad Yadav	Janata Dal (United)
Dara Singh Chauhan	Bahujan Samaj Party
Akhilesh Yadav	Samajwadi Party
Gurudas Dasgupta	Communist Party of India
Arjun Charan Sethi	Biju Janata Dal
M. Thambi Durai	All India Anna Dravida Munnetra Kazhagam

== Trial Court Verdict ==
On 21 December 2017, a Special CBI Court acquitted all the persons accused in the case.

Special Judge OP Saini stated in his judgement: "There is no evidence on the record produced before the Court indicating any criminality in the acts allegedly committed by the accused persons.” He added that “the chargesheet of the instant case is based mainly on misreading, selective reading, non-reading and out of context reading of the official record” and that "the chargesheet is based on some oral statements made by the witnesses during investigation, which the witnesses have not owned up in the witness box.”

== Delhi High Court Appeal ==
On 19 and 20 March 2018, the Enforcement Directorate and the CBI respectively filed appeals against trial court verdict in the Delhi High Court. On 22 March 2024, Delhi High Court's single-judge bench of Justice Dinesh Kumar Sharma agreed that the trial court's judgement requires deeper examination and re-appreciation of entire evidence and admitted the CBI's appeal. The court said that detailed arguments on the case will take place on 20 May.

In his 120-page judgement, Justice Sharma observed that, "The allegation is not about an “ordinary criminal offence” but an “economic offence” which is a separate class and is “required to be handled with a different approach”. The evidence has to be weighed and not counted. The court during the hearing has also noticed some contradictions in the (trial court's) judgment itself, which requires deeper examination. The trial judge had “repeatedly noted” that the prosecution should have given an opportunity to the witness to explain the statement made by them." The high court said that this raises the question as to, “why the Ld. Judge presiding over the trial did not exercise his jurisdiction under the Indian Evidence Act to seek any clarity, if there was any ambiguity."

== See also ==
- Indian Telecom Spectrum Auction
- Comptroller and Auditor General of India (CAG)
- Vinod Rai
- Coal mining in India

=== Other scams and corruption ===
- 1992 Indian stock market scam
- NSE co-location scam
- Mining scam in India
- Indian coal allocation scam
- Saradha Chit Fund Scam
- Uttar Pradesh NRHM scam
- Concerns and controversies over the 2010 Commonwealth Games
- List of scandals in India
- Corruption in India
- Licence Raj
- Mafia Raj
- Rent seeking

=== Anti-corruption efforts ===
- 2011 Indian anti-corruption movement
- Jan Lokpal Bill
- Right to Public Services legislation
- United Nations Convention against Corruption
