= Bawana =

Suburb of New Delhi, India

- City
- Nickname: बुआणा
- Location in India
- Coordinates: 28.8°N 77.03°E
- Country: India
- State: Delhi
- District: North West
- Established: 1168 CE
- Elevation: 213 m (699 ft)

Population (2001)
  - Total: 23,095

Languages
  - Official: Hindi, English
  - Local Dialect: Haryanvi
- Time zone: UTC+5:30 (IST)
- PIN: 110039

Bawana is a census town founded by two Gaur Brahmins Kala and Thukrai in the North West district of Delhi, India. It houses the Bawana Fortress of Zail (also called Bawana Tehsil), a Zail headquarter built by the Chief of the Bawana Zail, which was one of the four Zails of Delhi during British Raj along with Zails of Mehrauli, Dilli, and Najafgarh.

== Etymology ==
Bawana derives its name from the Hindi language word "bawan" (52), since this area was a group of 52 villages, 17 in Narela, 17 in Karala, 6 in Palam and 12 directly under Bawana, with 5,200 bighas of agricultural land.

== History ==
Bawana Zail was established in 1860w during British Raj in Bawana, and Bawana itself was established in 1168. of Taoru came to settle here, after spending some time in Mehrauli, and they eventually influential enough to become chaudhary (chief) of the area. The Zaildar built the Bawana Fortress in the 1860s as the headquarter of Bawana Zail (revenue unit) with 3 villages of Bawana, Alipur and Kanjhawala under its authority. It was one of the four Zails within colonial era Delhi district, along with Zails of Mehrauli, Dilli, and Najafgarh. Fortress has an arched gateway, a courtyard surrounded by corridors, has two rooms in the extreme corner on the left used as jail for the revenue defaulters who failed to pay the Zamindari tax, and next to jail rooms a small staircase leads to the terrace with guard post bastions on all four corners. Old water well dried up and its water also turned saline. In 1930-40s authorities started to use Bawana Zail Fortress as a school. Later it also served as a veterinary hospital for a short time before being used as an orphanage. In 1996-98 rule of Jat Chief Minister of Delhi, Sahib Singh Verma, it was turned into the office of Patwari, hence the zail fortress also came to be known as "Bawana Tehsil". Eventually, this run down building was abandoned, it saw minor restorations in 2004 and 2010 for the 2010 Commonwealth Games in Delhi though the earlier 2004 plan to convert it into a monument for the Indian independence freedom fighters did not materialise. A major restoration eventually commenced in February 2017 using original construction material including the use of lakhori bricks and lime mortar.

"From the zails of Bawana, Kanjhaola, and Alipur, 1,231 men went to the great war (first World War, 1914-1919). Of these, 81 gave up their lives."

— Archaeology department, marble plaque on the entrance of Bawana Zail Fortress

== Geography ==
Bawana has an average elevation of 213 metres (698 feet). It is surrounded by the villages of Nangal Thakran, Bajitpur, Daryapur, Majra Dabas, Pooth Khurd, Holabmi Khurd, Kheda Khurd, Holambi Kalan, Sultanpur Dabas and Ghogha. The area of the village under farming was 52000 bigha, but now most of this land has been acquired by the Delhi Government for industrial use. Bawana, with its khadar soil, is very fertile, with a high water table due to the western Yamuna canal and the high density of ponds. The climate in the region is extreme, with very high temperatures in the summer and almost zero level temperatures in the winter months. J.J colony, a slum area inside Dilshad Colony, is separated from Bawana by a canal.

A 1500 MW natural gas power plant is also in construction in the area. A 20 MGD water treatment plant has also been set up in consideration of the water woes of this region. Bawana also hosts an Air Force Station and a CRPF Base Camp.

== Demographics ==
As of 2011 India census, Bawana had a population of 73,680 of which 40,258 are males while 33,422 are females. Bawana has an average literacy rate of 71%, higher than the national average of 59.5%; with 77.22% of the males and 61.79% of females literate. 14.86% of the population is under 6 years of age.

== Politics ==
Originally a village of Delhi, Where every caste lives with peace and harmony. and it has a constituency in the Delhi Vidhan Sabha. Since 1993, when the Vidhan Sabha was re-constituted, the Bawana constituency has been reserved for Scheduled Castes and has been represented by Sh. Chandram (Bharatiya Janata Party) from 1993–1998, Sh. Surender Kumar (Indian National Congress) from 1998–2013, Sh. Gugan Singh (Bharatiya Janata Party) from 2013–2015, Sh.Ved Prakash (Aam Aadmi Party) from 2015-2017 and from 2020-2025 held by Sh.Ram Chander (Aam Aadmi Party). Currently it is held by Ravinder Indraj Singh of the Bharatiya Janata Party. It is a general seat for the MCD, represented by Sh. Ishwar Singh, Sh. Narain Singh, Sh. Devendra Kumar Pony and presently held by Sh. Bharam Prakash of BJP.

== Education ==
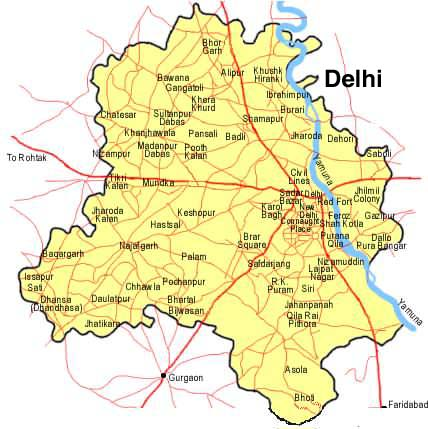
Map of Delhi showing location of Bawana

There are many government schools, BS schools and a girl's college named Aditi Mahavidyalaya affiliated with the University of Delhi.

== Sports ==
The Rajiv Gandhi Stadium was built in the village, to attract sportsmen and sportswomen from rural Delhi. The area has produced notable sportsmen such as Satpal Pahalwan, who won the gold medal in Delhi Asiad games. Manjeet Sehrawat, who played hockey for Delhi and bagged silver in National Games 2010. Manjeet, who belongs to Dariyapur Kalan, has also attended the trial camp for Asia Cup in 2009. Pawan Sehrawat and Mohit Sehrawat who play kabaddi in Pro Kabaddi leagues.
