= Chunnamal Haveli =

Mansion in Delhi, India

Coordinates: 28.65075°N 77.23307°E

Rai Chunnamal Ki Haveli
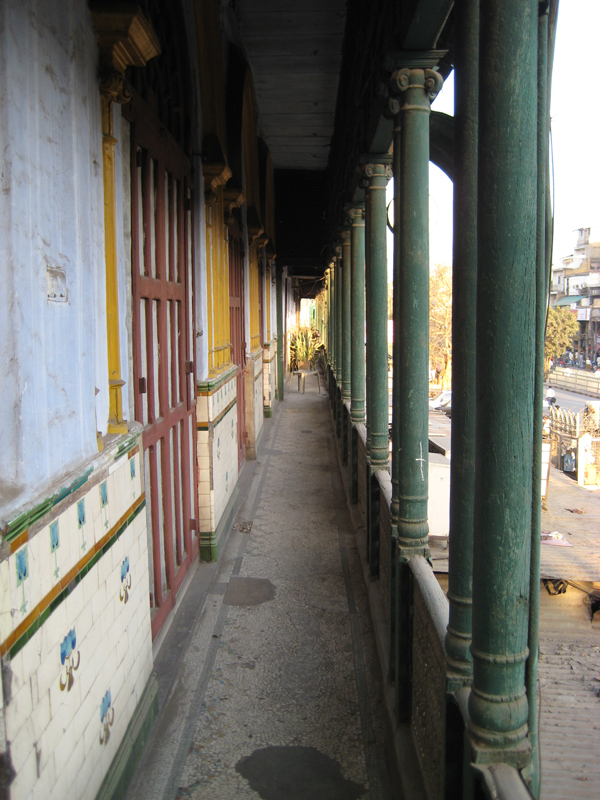
- Front view of the Chunnamal Haveli

- Haveli in Old Delhi Chunnamal Haveli (India)

History
- Founded: 1848
- Founder: Rai Chunnamal
- Built: c. 1855
- Built for: Rai Chunnamal
- Original use: Haveli

Site notes
- Owner: Pershad and Mohan family
- Website: https://www.chunnamalhaveli.com/

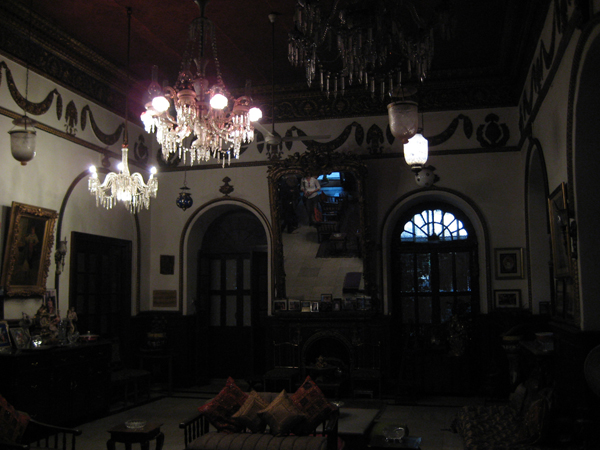
The Common and Family Room at the Chunnamal Haveli

Rai Chunnamal Ki Haveli is a rare haveli (old-style Indian courtyard mansion) surviving in a well-preserved condition within the Old Delhi area.

== Background ==
In the mid-1800s, Rai Chunnamal was an extremely wealthy merchant based in Chandni Chowk, Old Delhi. His family belonged to the Khatri caste of Punjabi traders.

=== Role during 1857 war ===
During the Indian Rebellion of 1857, Rai Chunnamal emerged as one of the wealthiest men in Delhi, having astutely read which way the wind was blowing, and made a vast fortune supplying provisions to the British. He had also refused a request for a loan from Emperor Bahadur Shah Zafar himself. Having refused the Emperor, he had left the city overnight after having previously sent much of his wealth out of the city secretly. After the hostilities ended, the British ordered the exile (forcible removal) of all Muslims from the city of Delhi. The poet Mirza Ghalib specifically mentioned the name of Rai Chunnamal while lamenting that men of low birth and less honour, like Chunnamal, were crowing and exulting in their glittering "illuminated mansions," while honourable men of old and noble families were "sifting the dirt" after being trampled down by the British.

=== Saving a mosque ===
However, the trader was to prove the poet wrong in his estimation of the man. Among the properties which Rai Chunnamal acquired during this period was the Fatehpuri Masjid, a sprawling 17th century mosque built by one of the wives of Mughal emperor Shah Jehan, and located not far from Chunnamal's mansion in old Delhi. After the Muslims were expelled from the city in 1857, the mosque was deemed redundant, and was auctioned by the British with the intention that it be demolished and the land be used for building new houses and shops. Rai Chunnamal purchased the structure at auction for the massive sum of Rs. 19,000. Lala Chunnamal (†29 January 1870), a Hindu belonging to an orthodox, upper-caste family, did not demolish the mosque but preserved it. He did this in spite of the fact that there were no Muslims in the area who could pray in the mosque. He just kept the mosque locked up and waited, like a philosophical Hindu, for times to change.

Twenty years later, in 1877, the British lifted the prohibition against Muslims entering (or living in) Delhi. This was done at the time of the Delhi Darbar of 1877, when Queen Victoria was proclaimed Empress of India. At this time, the mosque was acquired by the British and made available to Muslims for prayers. Lala Chunnamal family received an estate of four villages in exchange for the mosque. It is noteworthy that a similar mosque, Akbarabadi Masjid, built by another wife of Shah Jahan, did not survive under similar circumstances. That mosque had succumbed to British cannon fire during the battle and a very ruined structure had been auctioned later.

== The Haveli ==
The prosperity of the family survived into the twentieth century. The family was involved in the venture to establish India's first textile mill. Also, the Chunnamal family was the first in Delhi to acquire an automobile and a phone. The actress Simi Garewal was briefly married to Ravi Mohan, a scion of the Chunnamal family.

Today, this ancestral Chunnamal Haveli which stands at the Katra Nil section of Chandni Chowk - the heart of Old Delhi, is the last mansion to survive in a well-preserved condition. It is spread over one acre of land, with 150 rooms built on three floors. The mansion is surrounded by as many as 139 shops. An inscription on the wall of the mansion's drawing room states that it was built in 1848. However, some parts of it were added in 1864.

== Architecture ==
It is built using traditional material including lakhori bricks and lime mortar.

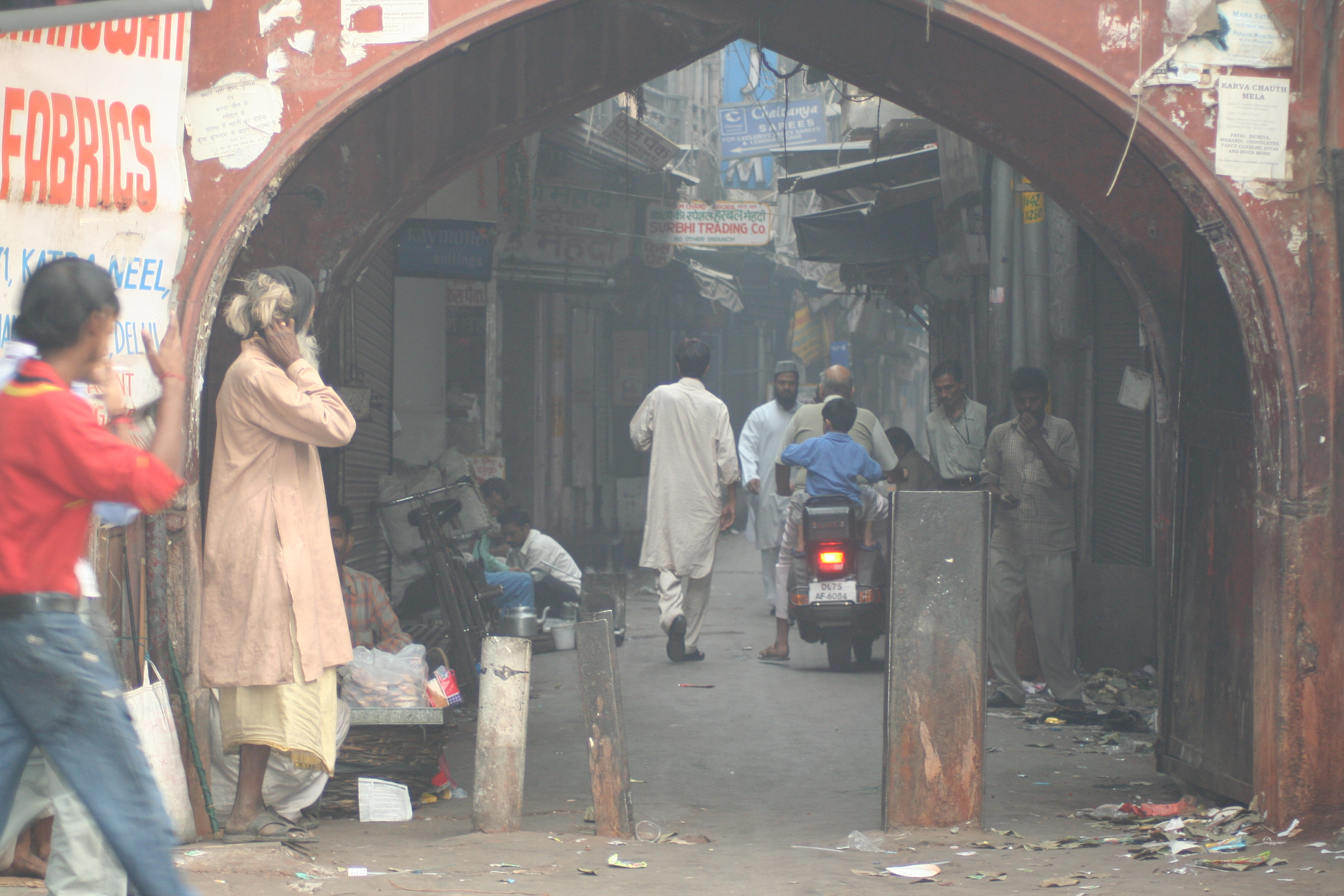
Gateway to Katra Neel

== Katra Neel ==
Katra Neel played an important role in the Quit India Movement 1942.

On 9 August 1942, a protest against the British Rule was organized just outside Katra Neel, Chandni Chowk, Delhi by Sh. Nanak Chand Mishra S/o. Sh. Hanuman Parshad Mishra along with his associates. During the course of firing, many people died and several were injured. Mishra sustained bullet injuries.

When India celebrated the 25th anniversary of its independence from British rule on 15 August 1972, Hon'ble Prime Minister Smt. Indira Gandhi honoured Sh. Nanak Chand Mishra with a "Tamrapatra" (a copper plate inscription) for being a Freedom Fighter.

== See also ==
- Chandni Chowk
- Dharampura Haveli
- Ghalib ki Haveli
- Nangal Sirohi havelis
