= Nanakshahi bricks =

Bricks used in traditional Sikh architecture

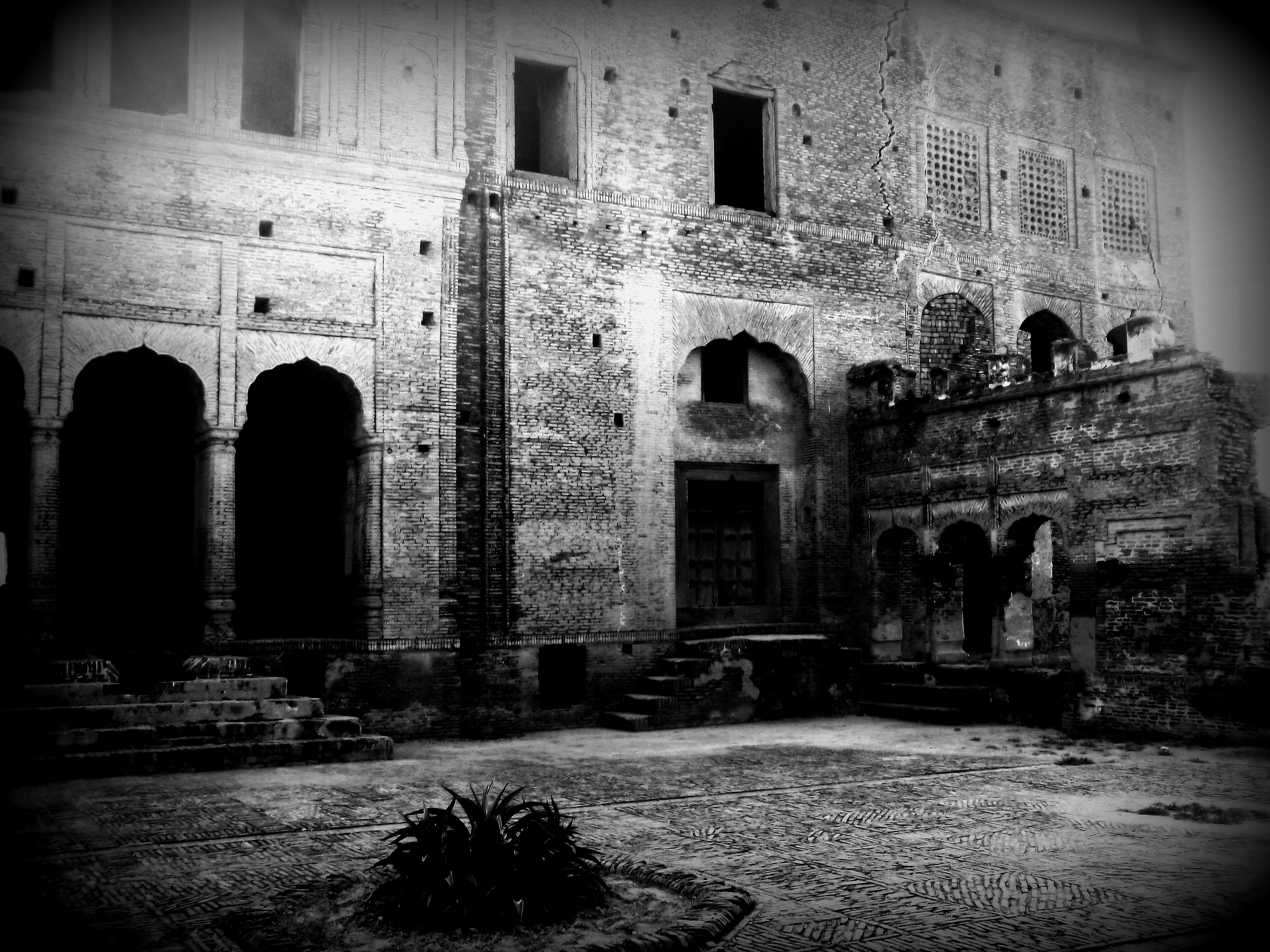
Sikh-era havelis constructed out of bricks at Qilla Sheikhupura, Pakistan

Nanakshahi bricks (Punjabi: ਨਾਨਕਸ਼ਾਹੀ ਇੱਟ, Nānakaśāhī iṭa; meaning "belonging to the reign of Guru Nanak") were decorative bricks used for structural walls during the Mughal era and Sikh period. (Note: 'Nanakshahi' is alternatively spelt with a space as 'Nanak Shahi'.) They are thin, flat, and rectangular burnt clay bricks. They were employed for constructing historical Sikh architecture, such as at the Golden Temple complex. They consisted of clay brick and mortar, being flat clay brick masonry with lime surkhi mortar. The British colonists also made use of the bricks in Punjab. They are notable for their strength and longevity. Most of them date from the 16th–19th centuries.

== History and usage ==
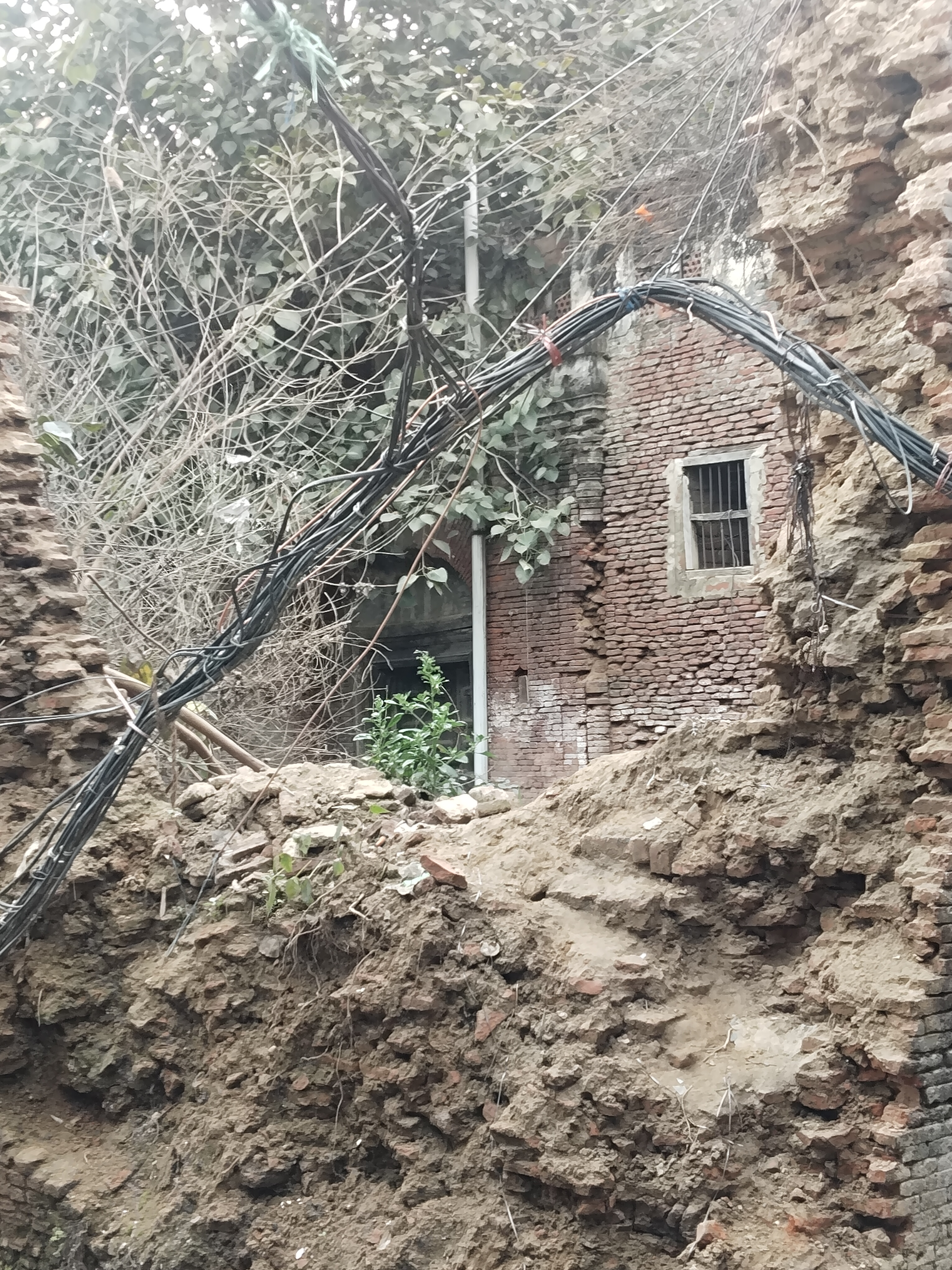
Haveli Diwan Dilbagh Rai, Fatehgarh Churian

Since ancient times, humanity has been using sun-dried, hand-molded, burnt clay bricks. From the late 14th to late 19th centuries, many structures were built with the bricks, both Mughal and Sikh sites. These sites are known as Nanakshahi monuments, described as clay brick masonry structures. They were built using lime and lime surkhi mortar, which consists of a powdered form of red burnt clay brick. Historically, these clay bricks were likely created using locally available raw material (such as clay earth) and hand-molded. Most of them were bonded with sukhi mortar but sometimes lime was used. The Sirhindi clay brick masonry structures were built using lime, crushed brick (surkhi), and sand aggregate mortar. Many fortresses, gurdwaras, and temples were built using these bricks. Nanakshahi bricks were used in the Mughal-era more for aesthetic or ornamental reasons rather than structural reasons. This variety of brick tiles were of moderate dimensions and could be used for reinforcing lime concretes in the structural walls and other thick components. But, as they made moldings, cornices, plasters, etc. easy to work into a variety of shapes, they were more often used as cladding or decorative material. In the present-day, the bricks are sometimes used to give a "historical" look to settings, such as when the surrounding of the Golden Temple complex was heavily renovated in the 2010s.

== Specifications ==
The bricks consist of specific physical and mechanical properties, and crystallographic compositions. The material consists of lime mortar, lime surkhi mortar, and clay bricks. They consist of crystalline molecular structure, composed out of quartz and calcium carbonate compounds, with lesser proportions of a hydrazinium hydrogen sulfide compound. The historical lime surkhi mortar is lime-rich with lime binder to surkhi, consisting of a sand aggregate proportion of 1:1.3:1.6. The chemical composition of old Nanakshahi bricks consists of filler SiO2 and binding elements such as Al2O3, Fe2O3, CaO, K2O and MgO. Chemically, historical Nanakshahi bricks were composed mostly of silica, alumina, iron, calcium, dipotassium oxide, and magnesia, with smaller amounts of chlorine, zirconium, oxides of disodium, phosphorus, manganese, barium, chromium, zinc, rubidium, strontium, nickel, copper, titanium dioxide, trioxides of sulphur and dichromium, lead monoxide and gallium oxide. Higher silica concentrations lead to better quality Nanakshahi bricks. Binding strength is determined via iron and magnesia concentrations. Meanwhile, the amount of calcium silicate is critical for the long-term survival of the brick, as it determines temperature resistance and structural stability. Similarly, heat-resistant titanium dioxide plays a role in spall and crack-resistance. Nanakshahi bricks have greater proportions of SiO2, Al2O3, Fe2O3, CaO, K2O and MgO and lesser amounts of Na2O, CL, SO3, TiO2, P2O5, MnO, BaO, Cr2O3, ZrO2, V2O5, ZnO, Rb2O, SrO, NiO, CaSiO3, CuO, Y2O3, PbO, Ga2O3, Nb2O5, and As2O3. Historical Nanakshahi bricks thus consisted of filler elements, namely silica (SiO2), and binding elements, including aluminum oxide (Al2O3), iron oxide (Fe2O3), calcium oxide (CaO), potassium oxide (K2O), and magnesium oxide (MgO).

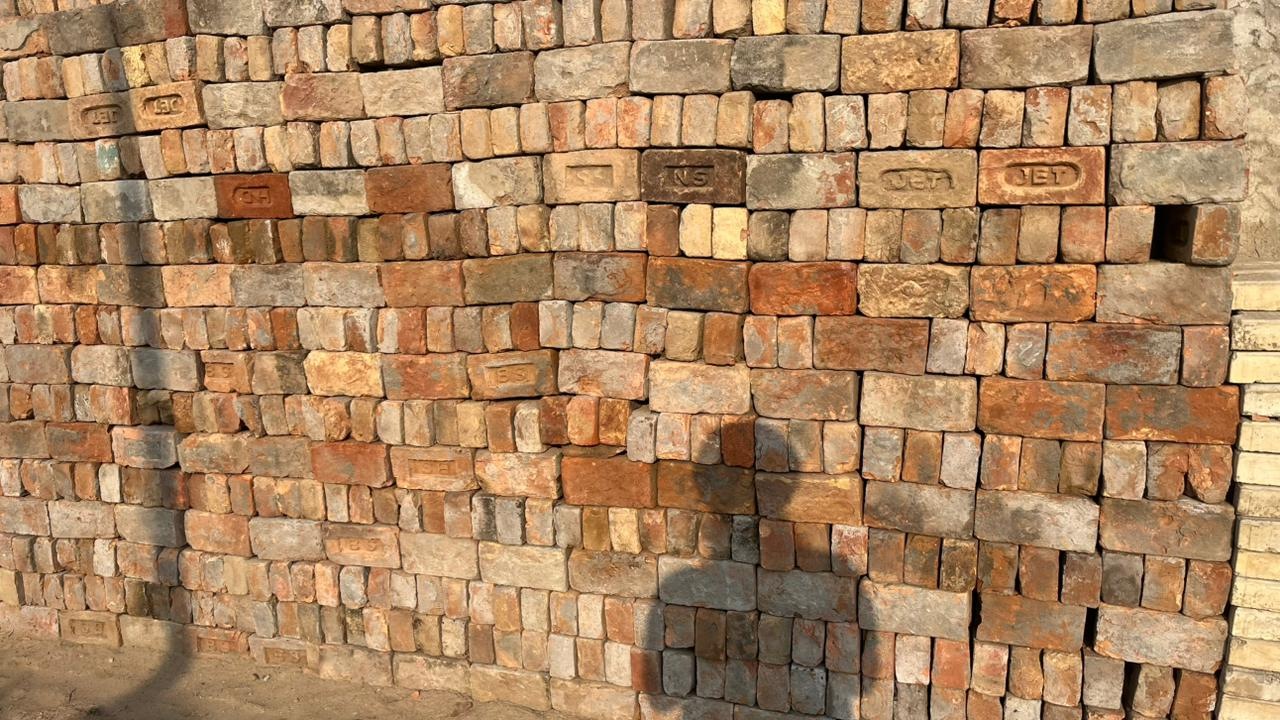
Recycled, modern, non-Nanakshahi bricks organised before construction

Nanakshahi bricks are moderate in-size. More often than not, the structures on which they were used, especially the Sikh temples (Gurudwaras), were a combination of two systems: trabeated and post-and-lintel, or based on arches. The surfaces were treated with lime or gypsum plaster which was molded into cornices, pilasters, and other structural as well as non-structural embellishments. Brick and lime mortar as well as lime or gypsum plaster, and lime concrete were the most favoured building materials, although stone (such as red stone and white marble) were also used in a number of shrines. They come in 4”x4” and 4”x6’’ sizes. On average, historical Nanakshahi bricks from 16th–19th century monuments in Indian Punjab are 18.3 cm × 9.4 cm × 2.7 cm (L × B × H) and 1.28 kg. Other estimates of their specifications include 9–23.3 cm, 6.5–12.4 cm and 3–3.9 cm, this is as compared to the specifications of modern, contemporary bricks in the southeastern Punjabiregion, which are 22.3–22.5 cm, 10.5–10.6 cm and 6.9–7.1 cm. Compression strength of them varies on average from 1.31–9.41 MPa while their elastic modulus averages from 1.31–9.41 MPa. While historical Nanakshahi bricks and current contemporary clay bricks have around the same density, Nanakshahi bricks have a lower water absorption rate and porosity but a high initial rate of absorption. Nanakshahi bricks have a greater compressive strength value compared to contemporary bricks. Thus, Nanakshahi bricks have "superior mechanical properties, physical properties and chemical compositions" when compared to modern Punjabi bricks. The properties of a brick are determined by its dimensions, regional aspects and composition of the clay mix, moisture and sand in the mix, size and shape of the pores, and temperature that the clay bricks are initially fired at. Clay bricks created using high fire temperatures are more resistant to weathering.

Specifications of southeastern Punjab's historical Nanakshahi bricks with contemporary conventional bricks and attempted recreations of Nanakshahi bricks
Historical Nanakshahi bricks		Contemporary clay bricks		Contemporary Nanakshahi bricks (recreation attempt) (Note: Recreated by mimicking the composition and specifications of historical Nanakshahi bricks of the same, local region.)	
Property	Value	Property	Value	Property	Value
Bulk density	1514 kg/m3 to 2447 kg/m3	Bulk density	1156 kg/m3 – 1485 kg/m3	Bulk density	1811 kg/m3 – 2000 kg/m3
Apparent density	1511 kg/m3 – 2444 kg/m3	Apparent density	1148 kg/m3 – 1474 kg/m3	Apparent density	1807 kg/m3 – 1997 kg/m3
Specific gravity	1.99 – 2.31	Specific gravity	1.51 – 1.72	Specific gravity	2.32 – 2.55
Void ratio	17.34% – 33.58%	Void ratio	21.63% – 33.85%	Void ratio	17.88% – 36.19%
Water absorption	8.29 % - 14.57 %	Water absorption	11.30 % – 13.48%	Water absorption	11.96% – 10.56%
Initial rate of absorption	17.49 g/cm2/min – 60.20 g/cm2/min	Initial rate of absorption	58.59 g/cm2/min – 91.05 g/cm2/min	Initial rate of absorption	28.83 g/cm2/min – 43.60 g/cm2/min
Porosity	11.40 % – 28.64 %	Porosity	18.06 % – 22.45 %	Porosity	20.39 % – 22.63 %

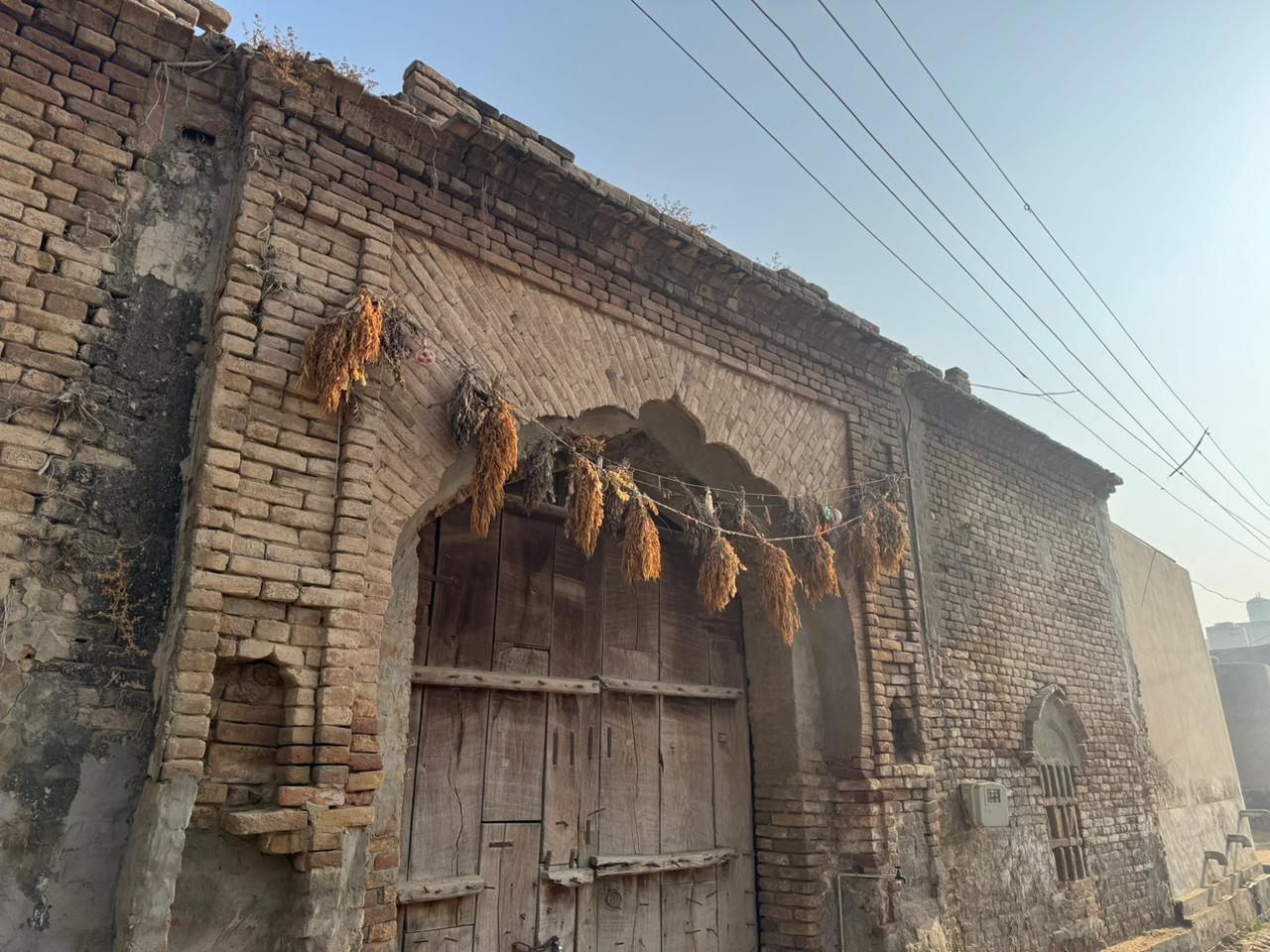
A haveli in Kundal, Abohar district, Punjab, India

Higher bulk densities leads to a stronger brick. A Nanakshahi site whose bricks have one of the highest bulk densities is those originating from the Todar Mal Haveli/Jahaz Haveli in Sirhind and bricks using material sourced from Malerkotla district have high bulk densities. Bulk density can be altered by modifying sand content and moisture content in the mix. Nanakshahi bricks with very high specific gravity were found at Nabha Qila. In regards to water absorption (percentage of the absorbed weight of water to the dry weight), due to clay bricks having a high amount of pores by volume, they are at risk of cracking, deterioration, and strength reduction due to freezing and thawing.

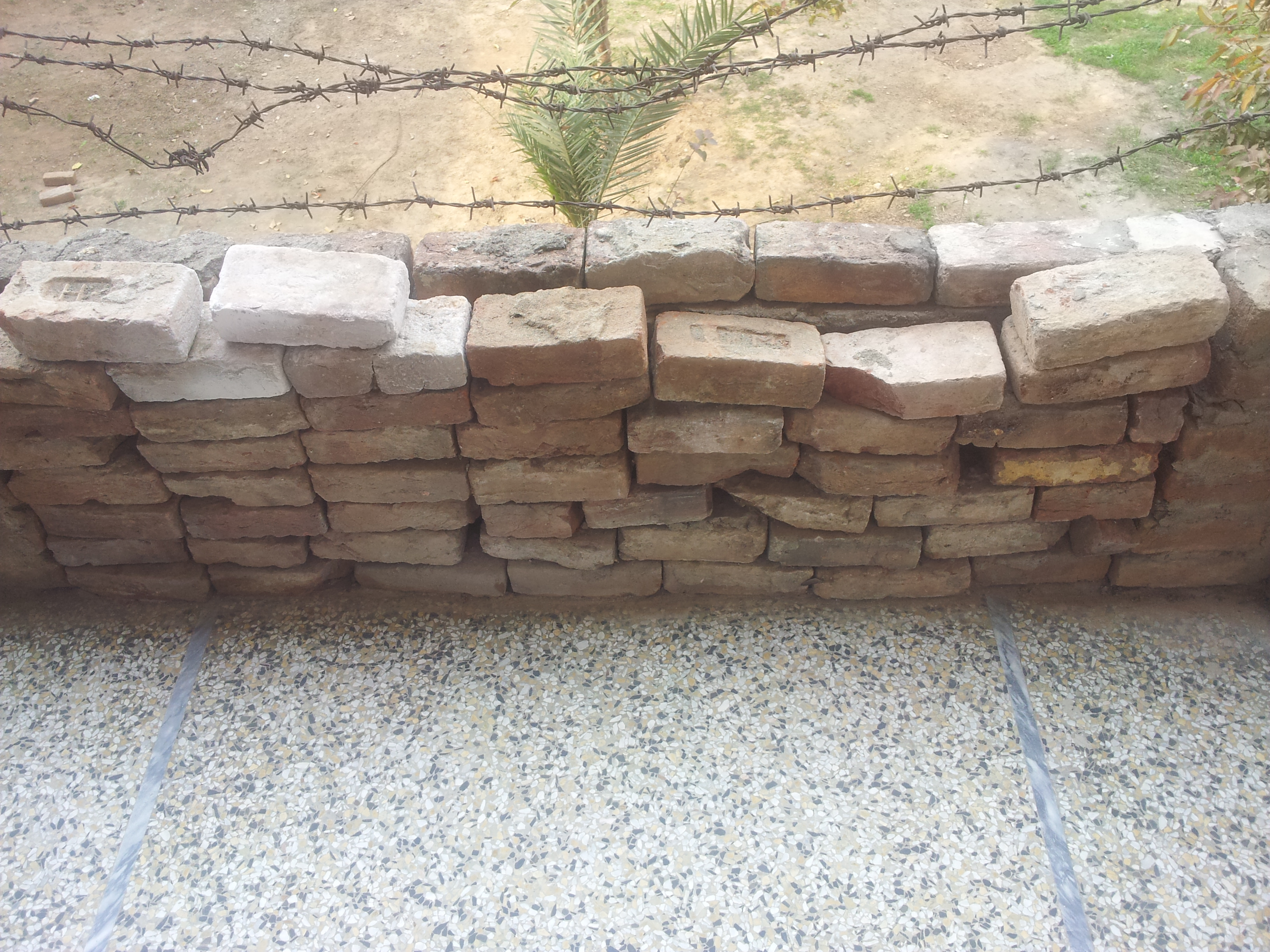
Modern bricks in Punjab, non-Nanakshahi

Nanakshahi bricks on average have a lower, average water absorption compared to modern clay bricks. In regards to initial rate of absorption (amount of water absorbed in one minute over 193.548 square centimeters of clay brick bed area), extremely high and low values are not desired, as they inhibit the adhesive qualities of the mortar and clay bricks, impacting durability and bending resistance. The initial rate of absorption is important for selecting the right type of mortar. Ideally, the value should be between 10 and 30 g/cm2/min for the best adhesion. Values greater than 30 g/cm2/min lead to poorer results. Adequate saturation of clay bricks prior to installation is essential to prevent bond failure resulting from the rapid suction of water into the bricks from the fresh mortar. The porosity value (volume of void spaces [cracks and pores] and the total volume) impacts clay brick quality, durability, and strength. Brick durability is highly related to the proportion of large pores, causing an increase in firing temperature. The uniaxial compressive strength (tied strongly with aspect ratio and thickness of the bricks) of contemporary clay bricks is less than half the amount of Nanakshahi bricks, being 21.90 MPa versus 50.5 MPa, owing to differences in pore density and clay brick thickness, with the value being related to mortar specifications, masonry walls, and unit thickness.

== Relationship with Lakhuri bricks ==
The term Nanakshahi and Lakhuri are sometimes used interchangeably for bricks. Due to a lack of understanding, sometimes contemporary writers confuse the Lakhuri bricks with other similar but distinct regional variants. For example, some writers use "Lakhuri bricks and Nanakshahi bricks" implying two different things, and others use "Lakhuri bricks or Nanakshahi bricks" inadvertently implying either are the same or two different things, leading to confusion on if they are the same, especially if these words are casually mentioned interchangeably.

Lakhuri bricks were used by the Mughal Empire that spanned across the Indian subcontinent, whereas Nanak Shahi bricks were used mainly across the Sikh Empire, that was spread across the Punjab region in the north-west Indian subcontinent, when Sikhs were in conflict with the Mughal Empire due to the religious persecution of Sikhs by Mughals. Coins struck by Sikh rulers between 1764 CE to 1777 CE were called Gobind Shahi coins (bearing an inscription in the name of Guru Gobind Singh), and coins struck from 1777 onward were called Nanak Shahi coins (bearing an inscription in the name of Guru Nanak).

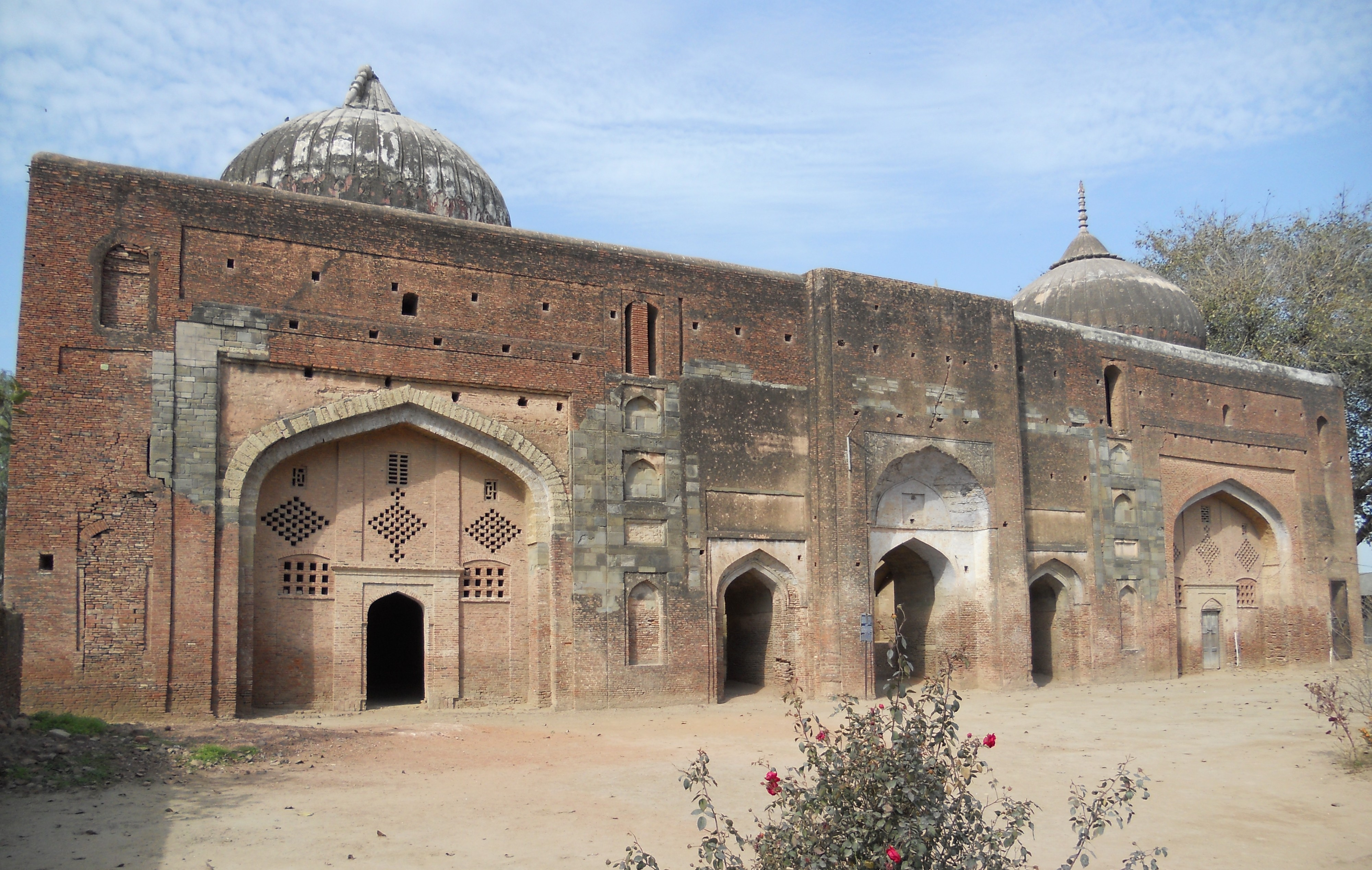
The mosque of Bhagat Sadhna at Sirhind was constructed using Nanakshahi bricks

Mughal-era Lakhuri bricks predate Nanakshahi bricks, as seen in Bahadurgarh Fort of Patiala that was built by the Mughal Nawab Saif Khan in 1658 CE using earlier-era Lakhuri bricks, and nearly 80 years later it was renovated using later-era Nanakshahi bricks and renamed in the honor of Guru Tegh Bahadur (as Guru Teg Bahadur had stayed at this fort for three months and nine days before leaving for Delhi when he was executed by Aurangzeb in 1675 CE) by Maharaja of Patiala Karam Singh in 1837 CE. Since the timeline of both the Mughal Empire and Sikh Empire overlapped, both Lakhuri and Nanakshahi bricks were used around the same time in their respective dominions. Restoration architect author Anil Laul clarifies "We, therefore, had slim bricks known as the Lakhori and Nanakshahi bricks in India and the slim Roman bricks or their equivalents for many other parts of the world."

== Conservation ==
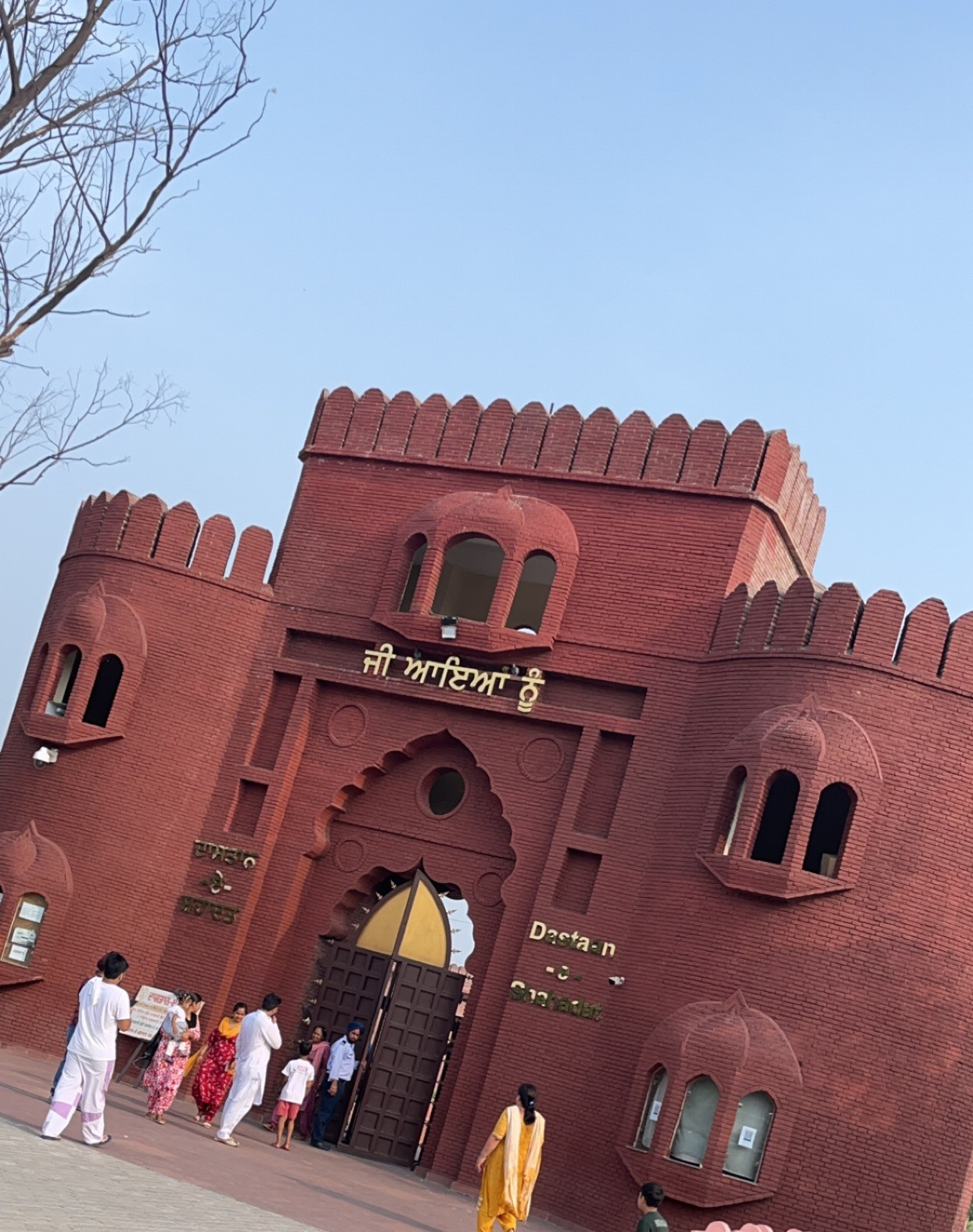
A modern building exterior (Dastan-e-Shahadat) constructed to superficially emulate the appearance of Nanakshahi bricks

Peter Bance, when evaluating the status of Sikh sites in present-day India, where the majority of Sikhs live today, criticizes the destruction of the originality of 19th century Sikh sites under the guise of "renovation", whereby historical structures are toppled and new buildings take their former place. An example cited by him of sites losing their originality relates to nanakshahi bricks, which are characteristic of Sikh architecture from the 19th century, being replaced by renovators of historical Sikh sites in India by marble and gold. Aside from manmade destruction, heritage brick structures are susceptible to earthquake damage, due to not being designed to withstand earthquake damage in the past.

=== Recreation of Nanakshahi brick properties ===
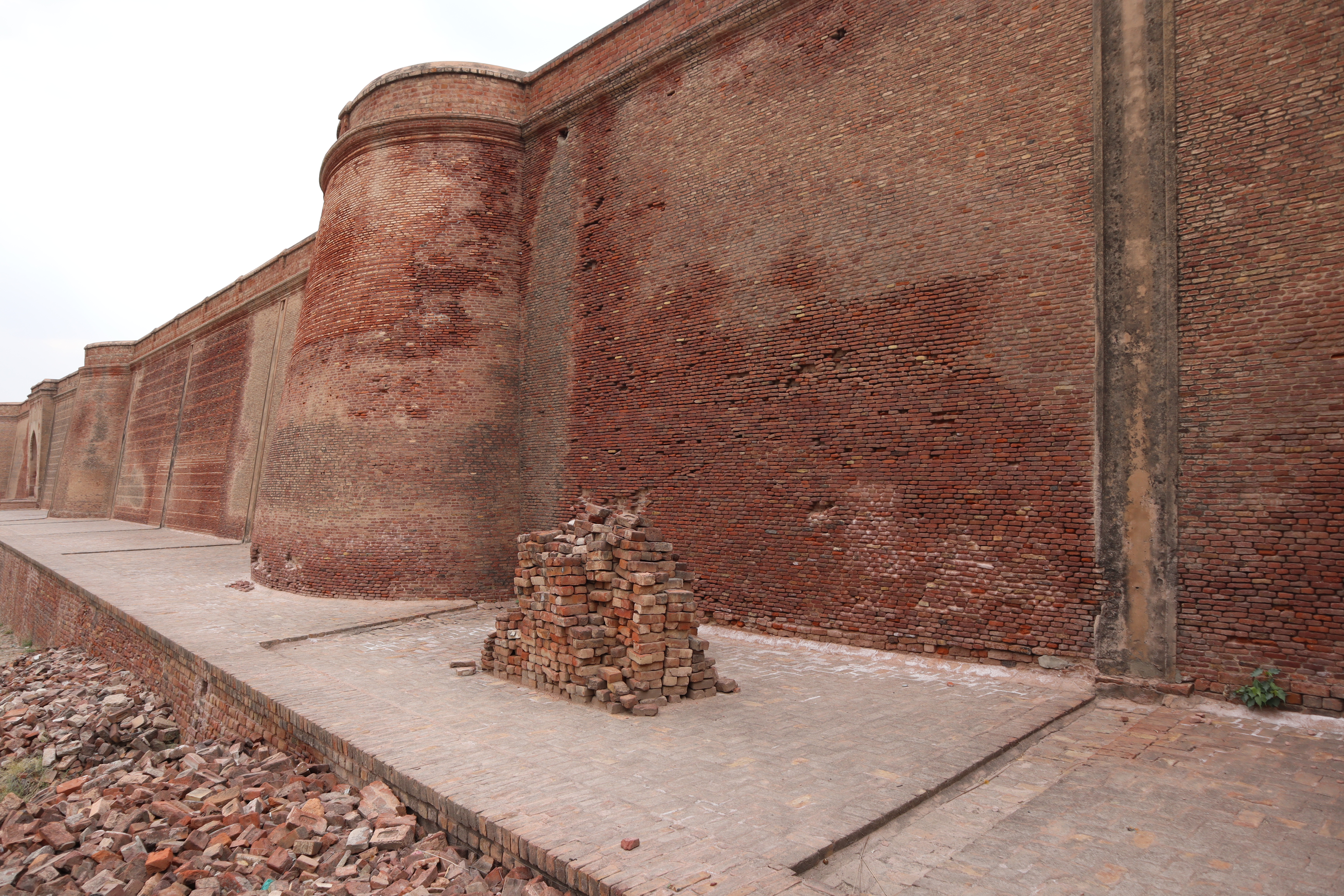
Photograph of a pile of bricks within Bathinda Fort, Bathinda district, Punjab, India, April 2023

Research has been conducted to find a suitable, modern material to repair heritage sites built with historical Nanakshahi bricks. This is because contemporary bricks have different measurements and compositions from historical Nanakshahi bricks, thus using modern bricks to repair Nanakshahi sites can cause further damage. Thus, the creation of new Nanakshahi bricks or the closest, modern equivalent is sought to achieve this purpose. This may be achieved by using the same regional soil type and mineral compositions that historical site's Nanakshahi bricks were composed of when creating new bricks, which have on average similar uniaxial compressive strengths, average bulk density, apparent density, water absorption, and porosity, to historical Nanakshahi bricks, owing to the usage of clay from the same geographical region as the Nanakshahi structure for manufacturing the replacement bricks. However, newly crafted Nanakshahi bricks have higher initial rates of water absorption when compared with historical Nanakshahi bricks, perhaps due to the differences between conventional and unconventional workmanship.

== See also ==
- Lakhori bricks
- Sikh architecture
