= Ghalib ki Haveli =

Coordinates: 28.6543099°N 77.2255774°E

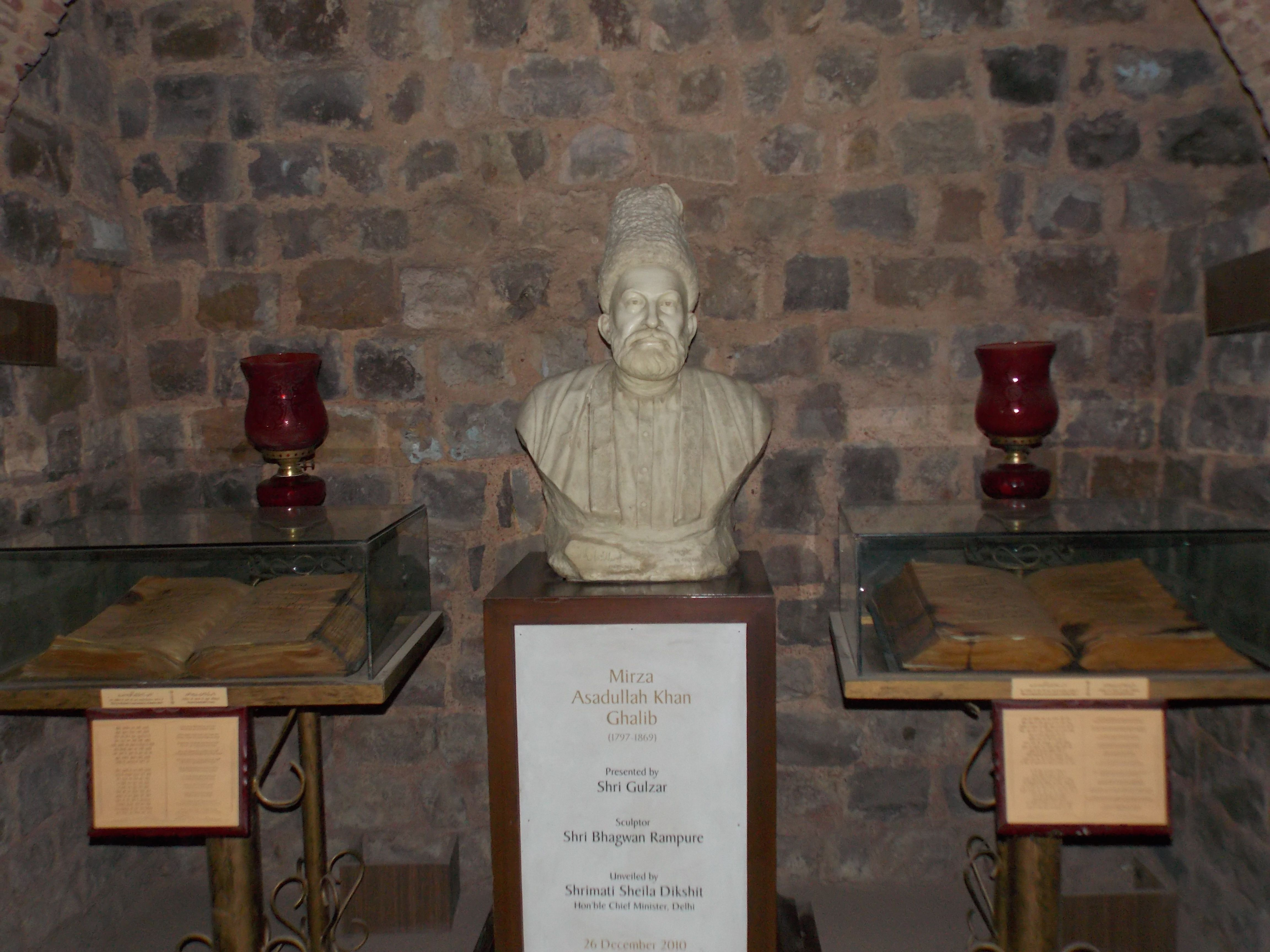
- Bust of Ghalib at the Haveli
- Established: 27 December 2000
- Location: Gali Qasim Jan, Ballimaran, Chandni Chowk, Old Delhi, India
- Type: Memorial museum, Biographical museum
- Accreditation: Archaeological Survey of India
- Key holdings: Handwritten poems of Ghalib
- Owner: Government of Delhi
- Public transit access: Chawri Bazaar Metro Station

Ghalib ki Haveli (ALA-LC: G̱ẖālib kī Ḥawelī IPA: [ˈɣɑːlɪb kiː ɦəˈʋeːliː], lit. 'Ghalib's Mansion') is a haveli in Gali Qasim Jan (lit. 'Qasim Jan Street'), Ballimaran, in the Chandni Chowk neighbourhood of Old Delhi. It was the residence of the 19th-century Indian poet Ghalib and is now a heritage site. Its Mughal architecture reflects the period when the Mughal era was on the decline in India.

The house was given to him by Hakim, a physician who is believed was an enthusiast of his poetry. After the poet's death in 1869, Hakim used to sit there every evening, not allowing anyone enter the building.

== History ==
Ghalib lived in this haveli for a long period of his life after he came from Agra. While staying at this haveli, he wrote his Urdu and Persian 'diwans' (Diwan-e-Ghalib). Years after Ghalib's death the place housed shops inside it until the year 1999 after which the government acquired a portion of it and renovated it. It was given a special touch with the use of Mughal lakhori bricks, sandstone and a wooden entrance gate to recreate the 19th-century period.

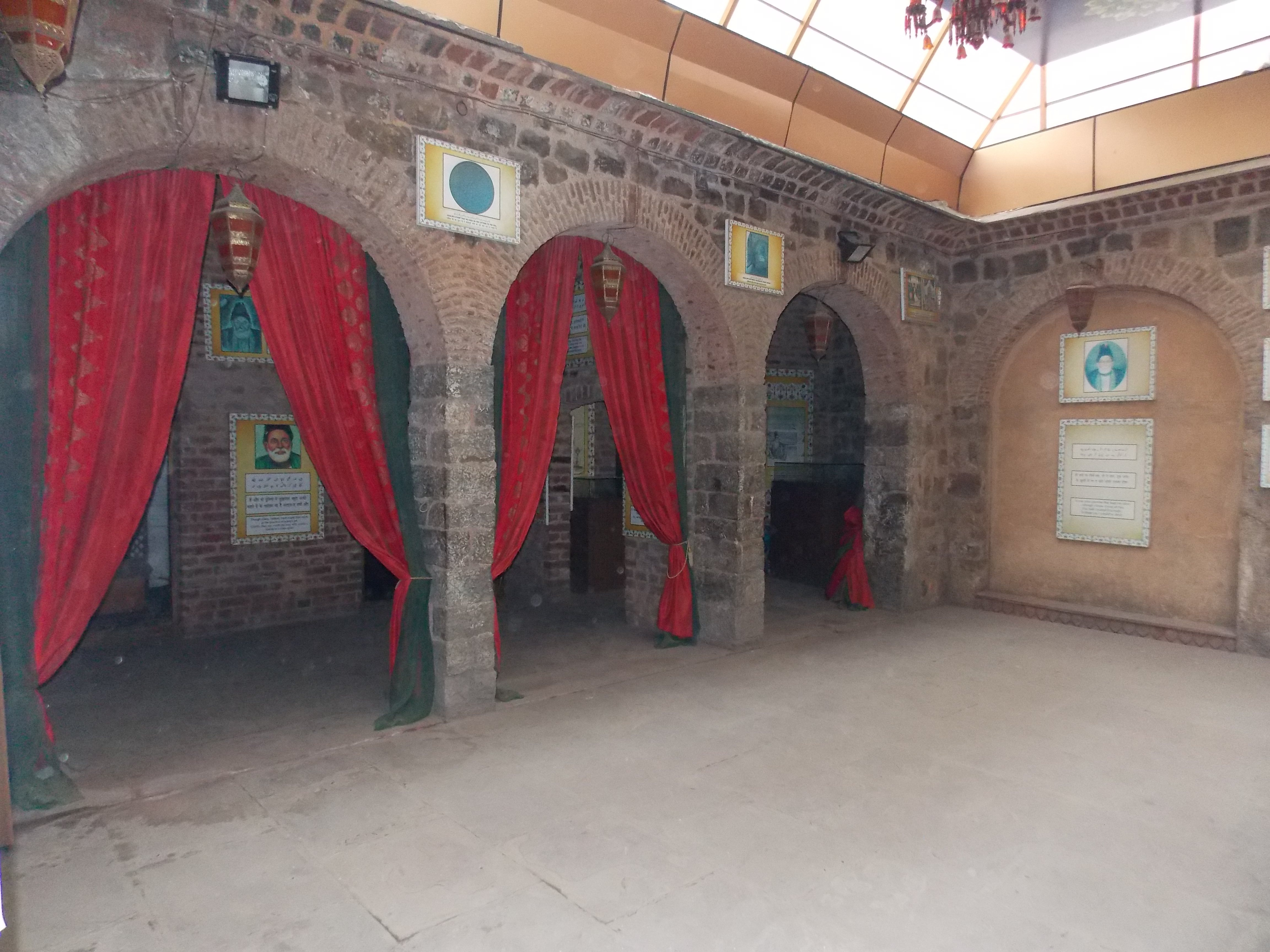
A view of the Haveli

After takeover by the Delhi government the haveli was made into a permanent memorial museum in 2000 housing objects related to the poet and his times. It also houses various hand written poems by the poet besides his books. The museum also houses a life size replica of the poet in a realistic setting with a hookah in his hand. Portraits of Ustaad Zauq, Abu Zafar, Momin, and other noted contemporaries of Ghalib can also be seen. On 27 December 2010, former Delhi Chief Minister Sheila Dikshit unveiled a sculpture of the poet that was sculpted by a well known artist Bhagwan Rampure and commissioned by poet and lyricist Gulzar. A portrait of Ghalib commissioned by the former president of India Dr. Zakir Husain served as the blue print for the sculpture.

The walls are adorned with the huge portrait of the poet and his couplets which are hung around the side walls.

اگ رہا ہے در و دیوار سے سبزہ غاؔلب
ہم بیاباں میں ہیں اور گھر میں بہار آئی ہے

Transliteration (ALA-LC):
Ug rahā hai dar-o-dīvār se sabza 'ġhālib',
Ham bayābāñ meñ haiñ aur ghar meñ bahār aa.ī hai.

It is roughly translated into English as:
"Greenery is growing out of the doors and walls, 'Ghalib'!
I am in wilderness and spring has arrived at my house."

== Architecture ==
Mirza Ghalib's Haveli is located in the Old Delhi and is a heritage site declared by the Archaeological Survey of India. It offers an insight into the Mirza Ghalib's lifestyle and architecture of the Mughal era. The large compound of the haveli with columns and bricks are the reminiscence of the Mughal Empire in Delhi. It is built using traditional material including lakhori bricks and lime mortar.

== Information ==
Located near Chawri Bazar metro station and Delhi Junction railway station it is open to all, with free entry and no photography charges, from 11 am till 6 pm on all days except Monday.

== Gallery ==
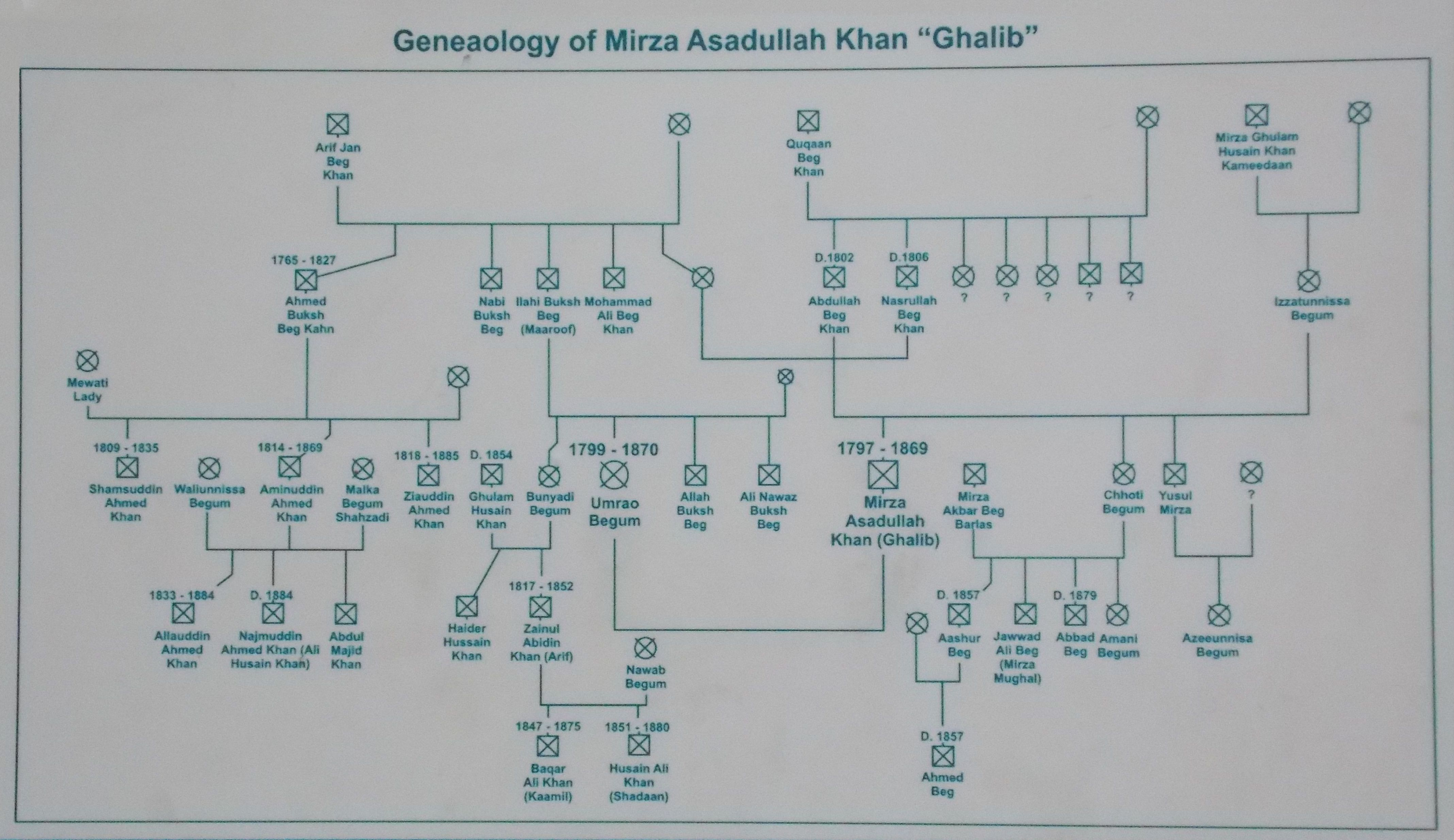
Genealogy of Ghalib as displayed at the Ghalib ki Haveli, Old Delhi

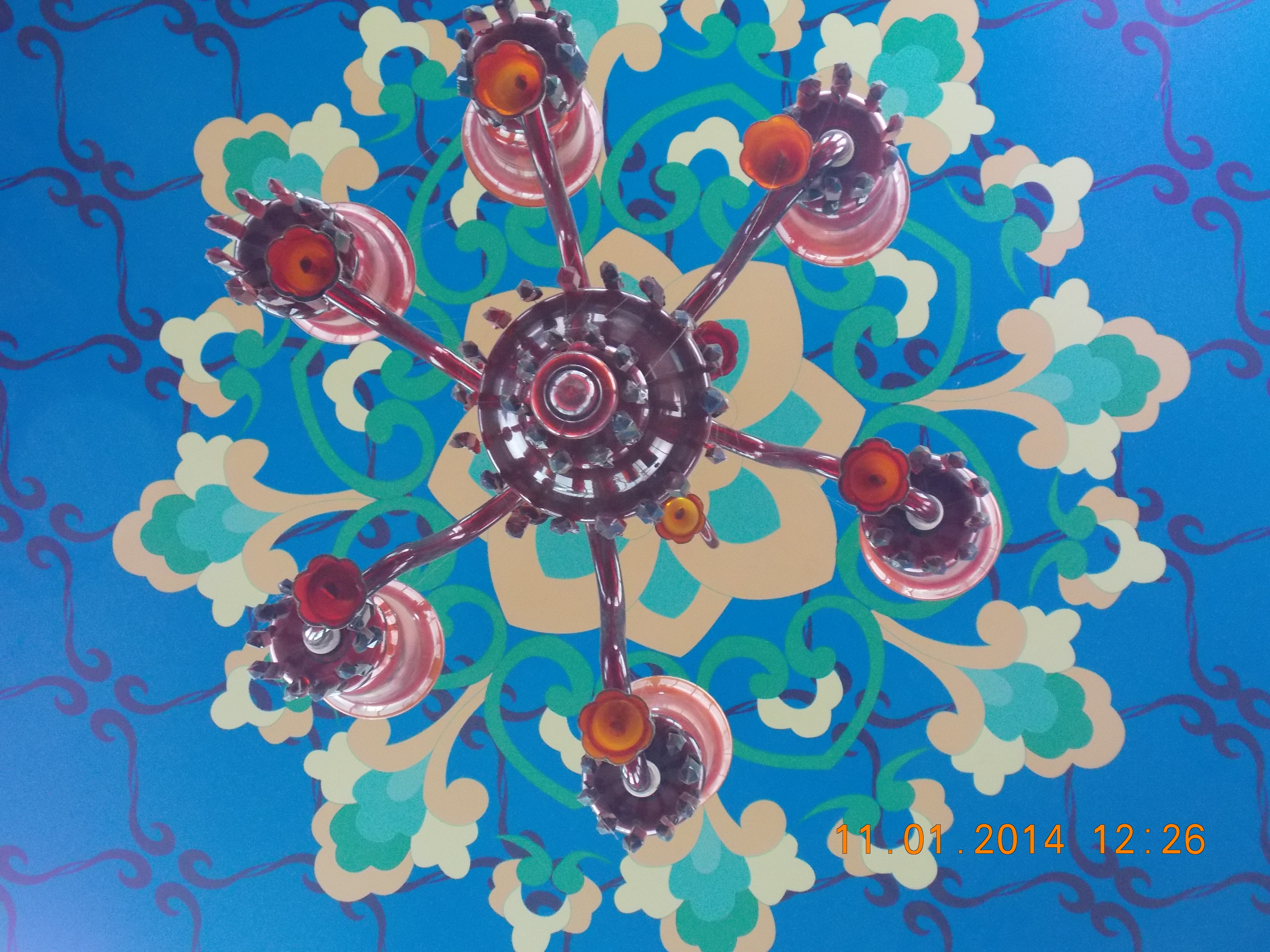
Renovated roof Ghalib ki Haveli

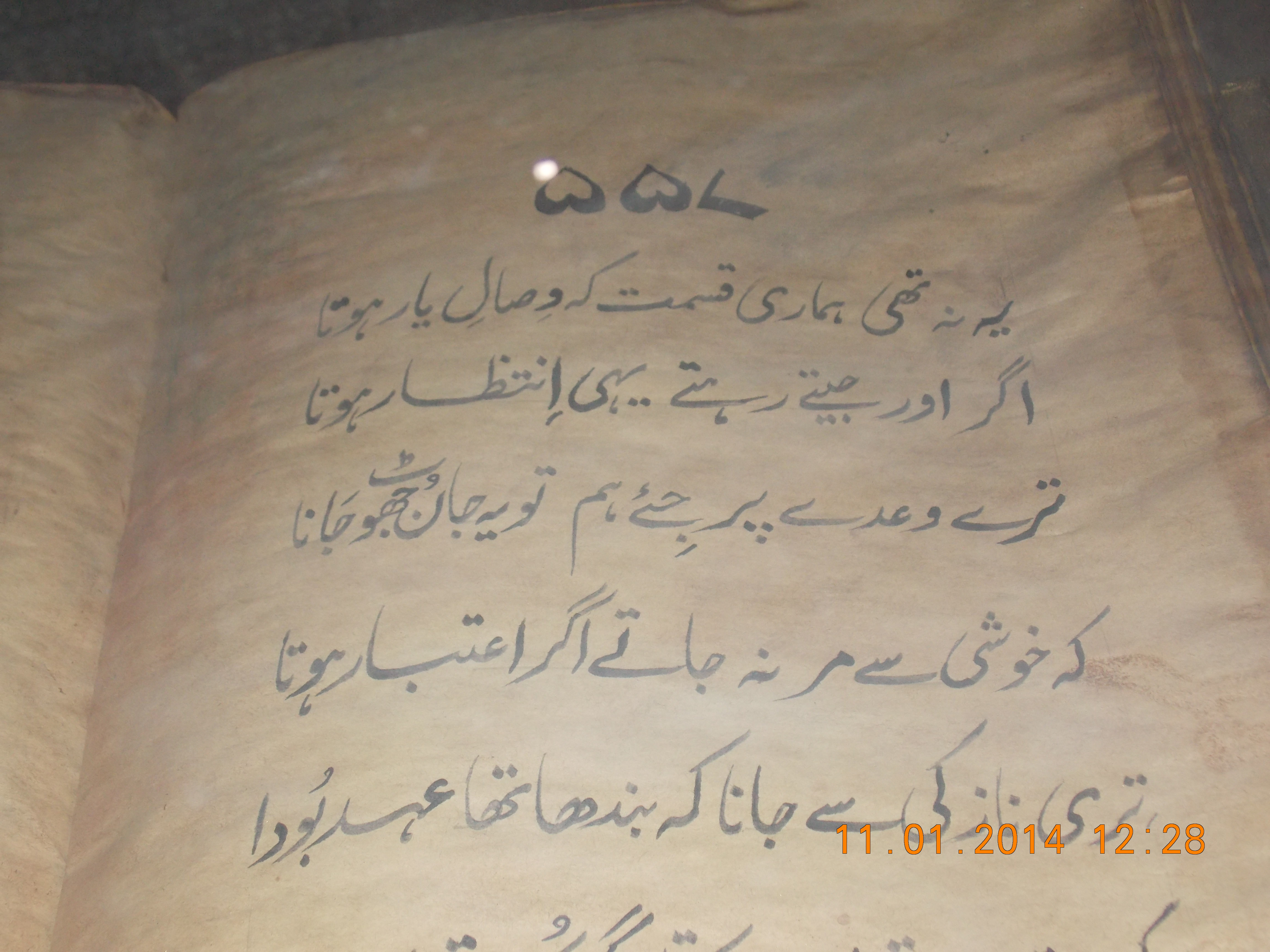
A page from Ghalib's Diwan reading "Ye na thi hamari qismat..."

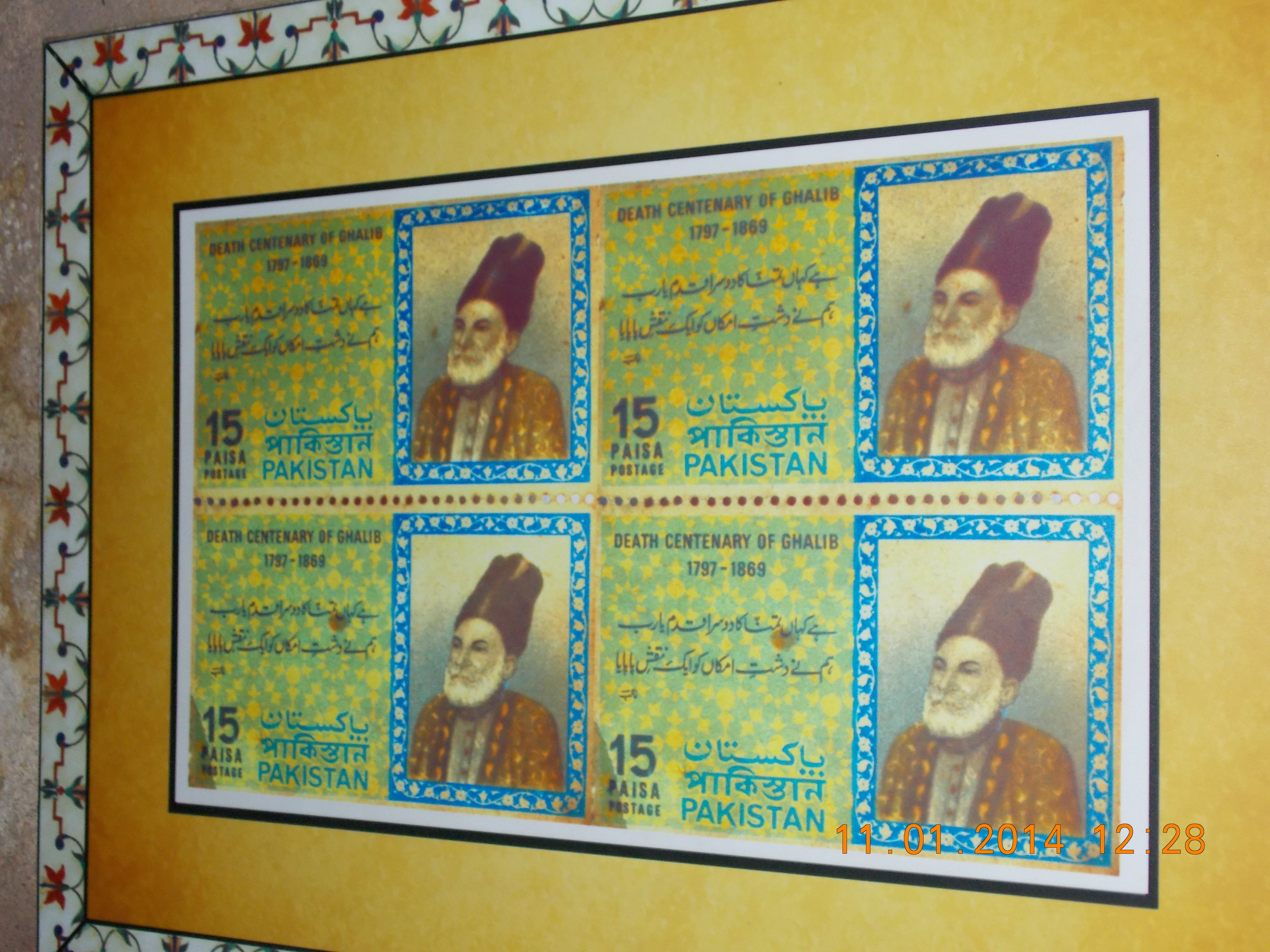
Postal stamp in memory of Ghalib, Government of Pakistan

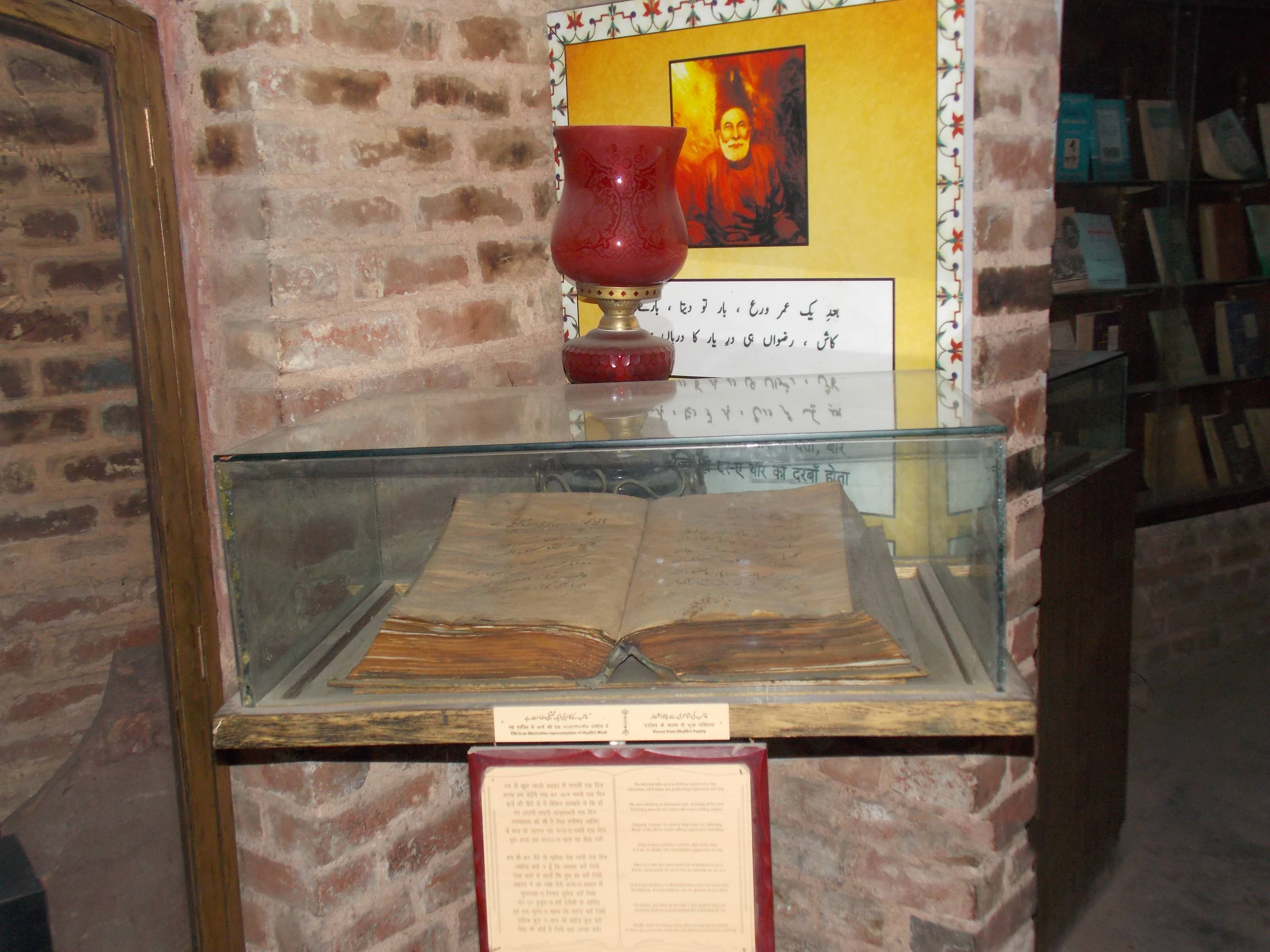
At Ghalib ki Haveli

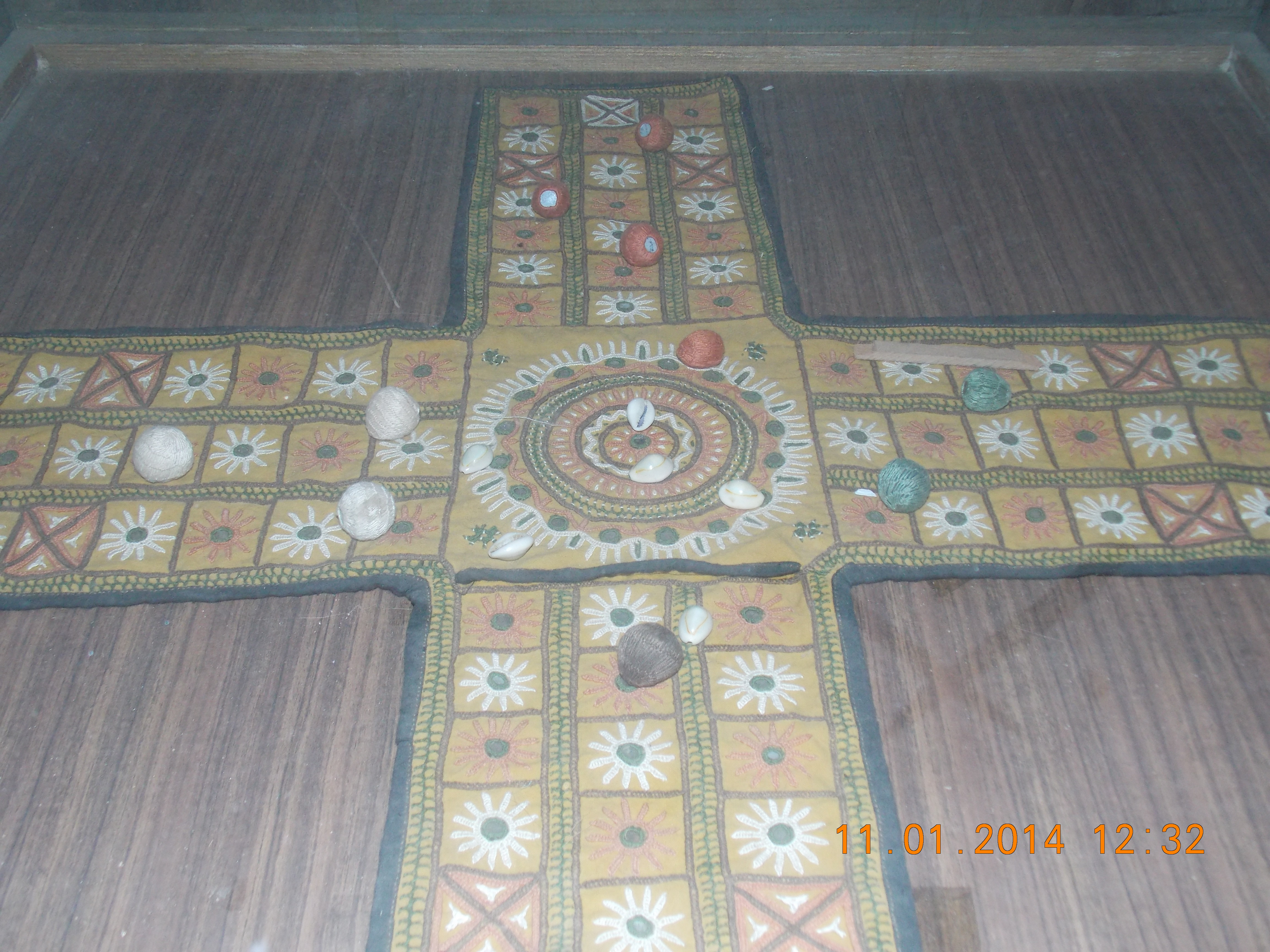
Game of "Chaupar" (similar to ludo) Ghalib's favourite pastime

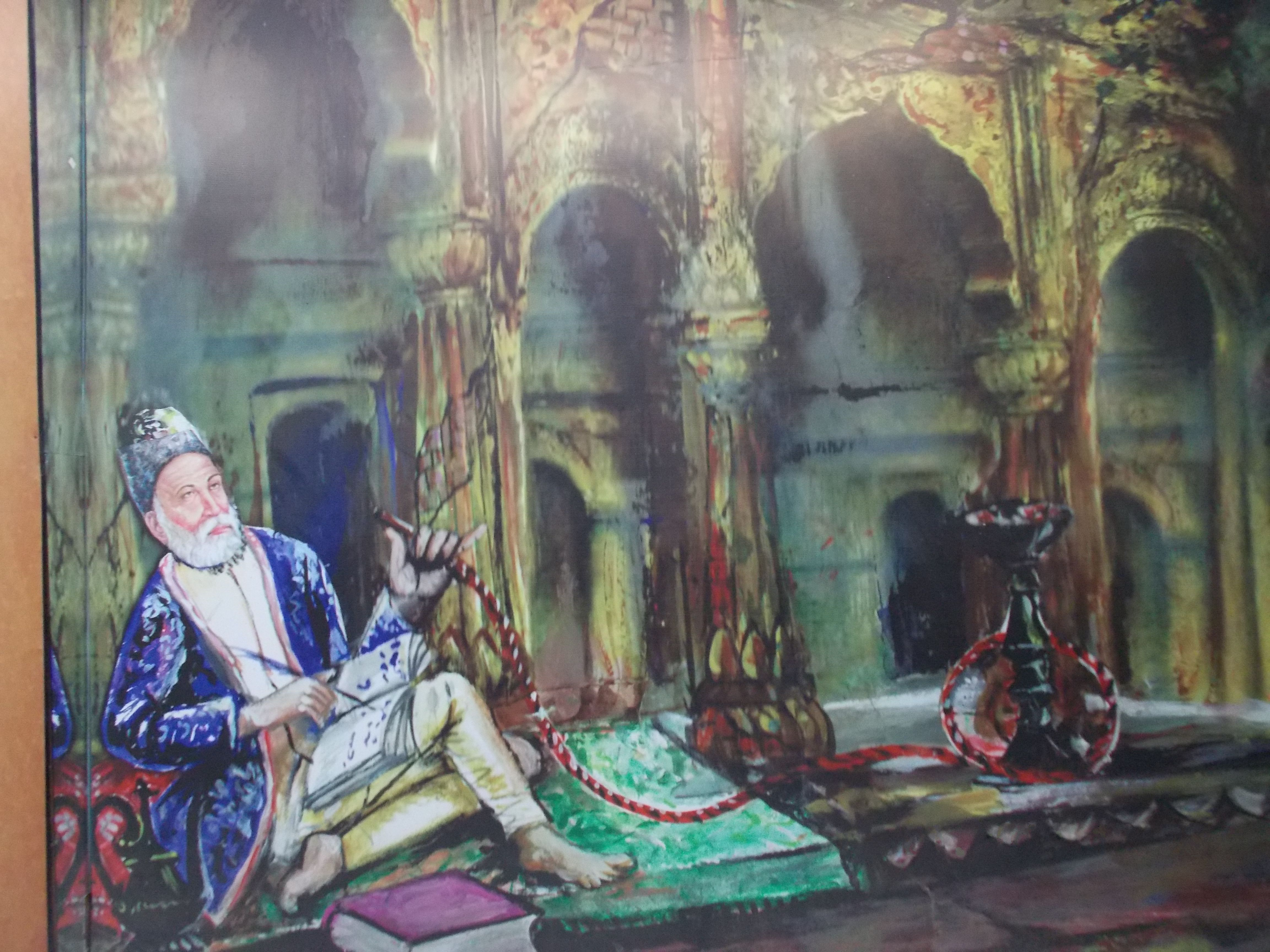
A visual projection of Ghalib during his leisure time

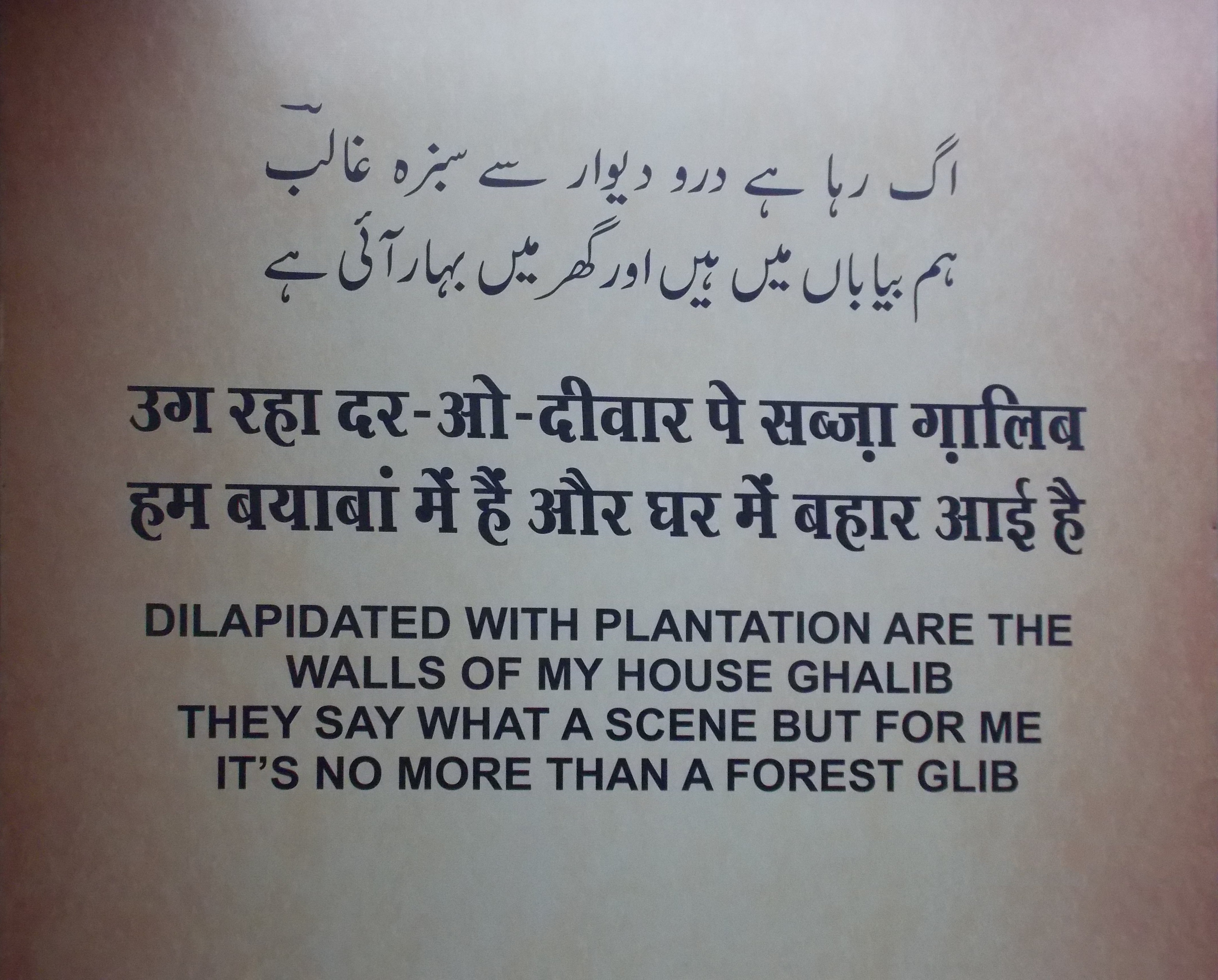
A couplet on the wall

== See also ==
- Ghalib Museum, Delhi
- Ghalib Academy, Delhi
- Chandni Chowk
- Chunnamal Haveli
- Dharampura Haveli
- Nangal Sirohi havelis
