= Shahpur Jat =

- Neighborhood of Delhi
- Location in Delhi, India
- Coordinates: 28°33′N 77°13′E
- Country: India
- State: Delhi
- District: South Delhi
- Metro: Hauz Khas

Languages
  - Official: Hindi
- Time zone: UTC+5:30 (IST)
- Planning agency: MCD

Shahpur Jat is an urban village located near Hauz Khas, in the South Delhi district of Delhi, India.

== History ==
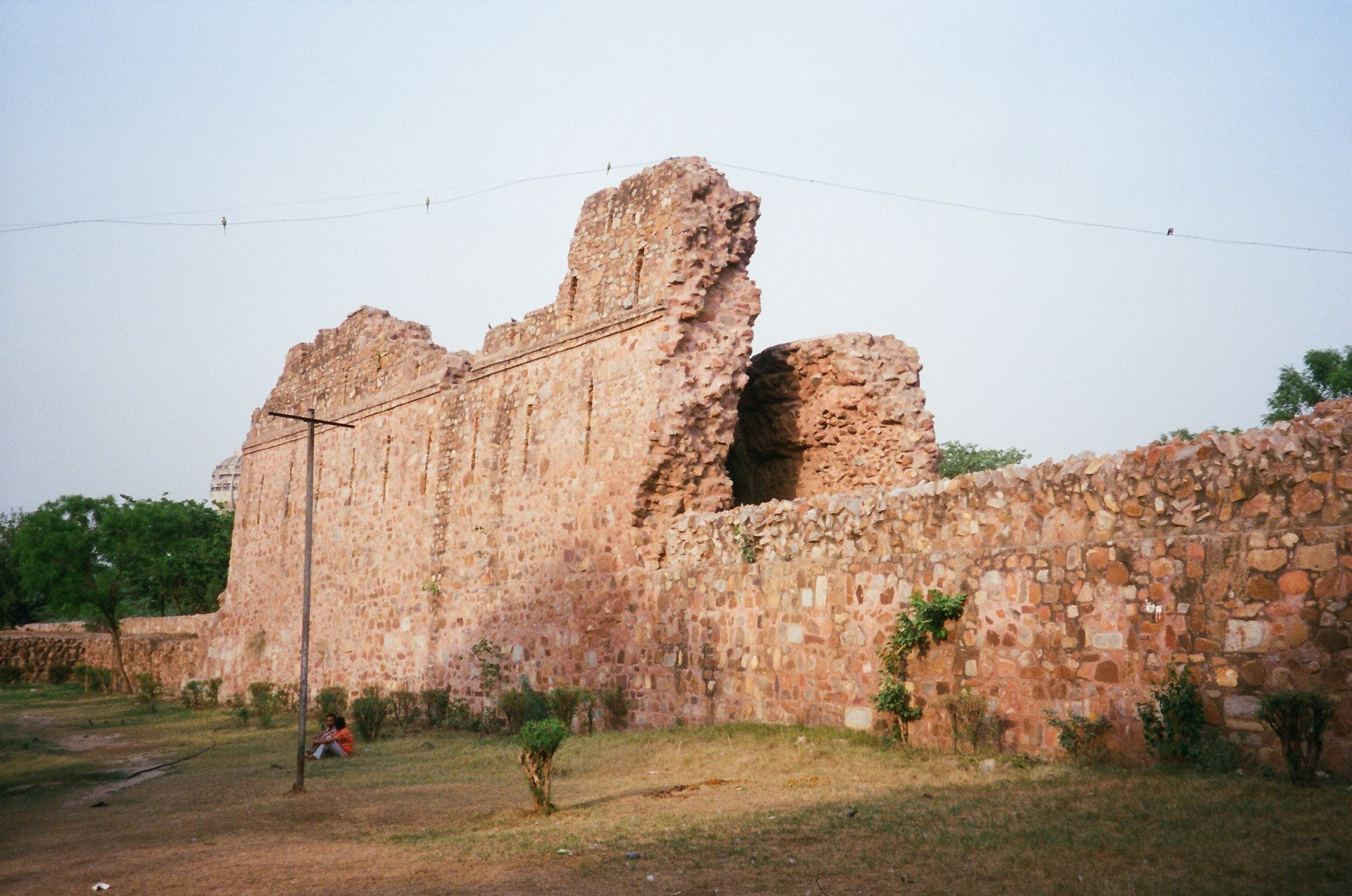
Ruins of Siri Fort wall.

When the Siri Fort was abandoned, Jaats moved to the Shahpur Jat area, being attracted to the fertile lands.

== Architecture ==
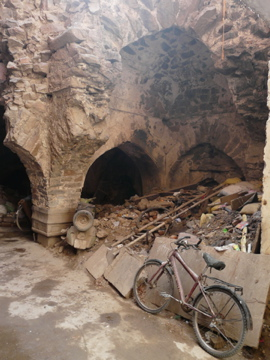
Baradari in Shahpur Jat.

Shahpur Jat is a historical village featuring traditional havelis and the remains of the historical capital city Siri Fort, such as the stretches of the thick city walls, all surrounded by 20th century apartment and office buildings.

== See also ==
- Panwar, Dagar Jats
- Siri Fort
- Bawana Fortress of Jat Zail
- 1754 capture of Delhi by Jats
