= Dharampura Haveli =

Coordinates: 28.6533046°N 77.2322728°E

Haveli Dharampura
- Haveli in old Delhi Dharampura Haveli (India) Dharampura Haveli (Asia) Dharampura Haveli (Earth)

History
- Built: 1887 CE
- Built for: Muslim residents
- Original use: Haveli

Site notes
- Architect: Kapil Aggarwal
- Owner: Vijay Goel, BJP leader
- Website: www.havelidharampura.com

Haveli Dharampura, built in 1887 CE and currently owned by Bharatiya Janata Party leader Vijay Goel, is a 19th-century haveli in Chandani Chowk area of old Delhi that as awarded a special mention in UNESCO Asia-Pacific Awards for Cultural Heritage Conservation in 2017.

== Architecture ==
Spread over 500 sq. yards it is built in the architecture of 19th and 20th around a central courtyard it has intricate designs of wood work on the rooftops, sculptures and Hindu goddesses engraved in stone and steel, antique balconies intricate stone brackets, balconies, jharoka, red sandstone brackets, floral decorations, motifs, wooden joist flooring and lime concrete flooring, multi foliated arched gateway and arches, carved sandstone facades, large arched openings with elephants and intricate carvings on the main door, wooden doorways using traditional material including lakhori bricks and lime mortar.

This heritage building classified as "category-2 protected building" by the Delhi government's Department of Archaeology. It was bought and restored by Vijay Goel, a member of the Bharatiya Janata Party (BJP), and refashioned into a modern 14-rooms 5-star hotel with ancestral haveli look and feel also has a restaurant named lakhouri.

== Restoration ==
From 2011 to 2016 six year restoration project of this protected heritage building by its current owner, Mr Goel, with no financial or technical support from the government. he resisted the urge to add new rooms or use more affordable modern material. Instead of iron grille, he used more expensive cast iron grille, painted the doors blue as was historically customary for the neighborhood, cleared 1000 truckloads of rubble, brought artists who had worked on restoration of UNESCO heritage listed Red Fort, it was the first haveli to be completely restored in last 100 years. His vision of restoration of other havelis of the neighborhood is based on sustainable heritage conservation methods and sustainable financial commercial use of the havelis while staying true to the original heritage of havelis. He was attracted to this haveli, its chajjas (roofs), pillars, balconies, everything fascinated him.

"You need heart to conserve heritage."

— Vijay Goel, haveli owner and BJP leader, The Sunday Guardian

== See also ==
- Chandni Chowk
- Chunnamal Haveli
- Ghalib ki Haveli
- Nangal Sirohi havelis
