= Nangal Sirohi =

- City
- Location in Haryana, India Nangal Sirohi (India)
- Coordinates: 28.193161°N 76.132078°E
- Country: India
- State: Haryana
- District: Mahendragarh

Area
  - Total: 10.4 km^{2} (4.0 sq mi)

Population (2001)
  - Total: 10,000
  - Density: 960/km^{2} (2,500/sq mi)

Languages
  - Official: Hindi
- Time zone: UTC+5:30 (IST)
- PIN: 123028
- Telephone code: 01285
- ISO 3166 code: IN-HR
- Vehicle registration: HR-34
- Website: haryana.gov.in

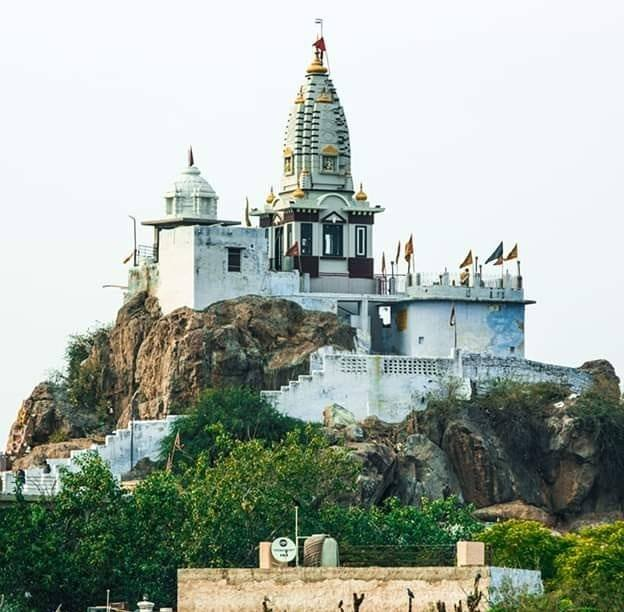
Temple of Village Deity Baba Kalia Toda

Nangal Sirohi, famous for the painted Shekhavati Rajput architecture Havelis, is a village in Mahendragarh district in the Indian state of Haryana. It is 9.5 km from Mahendragarh towards Narnaul (15.5 km from Narnaul) in South Haryana.

== History ==
Nangal-Sirohi was founded by Ahirs of Khosya gotra whose ancestors came from the neighboring Deroli Ahir village. 500 years ago, The Nangal Sirohi village is situated between Mohinder Garh and Narnaul City on National Highway 148 B. The village was settled in 1526 AD by the two brothers, who were come from nearby village Deroli Ahir. These two brothers are called Thoak Bhagwana and Thoak Harbakash. The village is 9 km south of Mahendergarh and 15 km north of Narnaul. Its length from north to south is 5 km and 2 km from west to east. The area is approximately 10.4 sq. km.

=== Havelis and architecture ===
This area which was earlier under the Jaipur state, came under the Sindhu Jat ruler Maharaja of Patiala. Lala Tek Chand was first among them to build the fortalice Haveli. Nangal Sirohi, 16 km from Narunail and 9 km from Mahindragarh, is famous for its historic havelis built by baniyas who had migrated from Satnali eight generations ago (c. 2002). Later in Vikram Samvat 1959 (1902 CE), Lala Deen Dayal built an ornately decorated caravanserai in Shekhavati Rajput architecture.

Havelis are located in the older Part of the village called Nichla Baas (downside habitation), built by local trading communities in 18th, 19th and 20th centuries. These were built by Chejaraas (masons) and Chiteyraas (painters) summoned from Shekhawati region of the erstwhile Jaipur State of Rajpootana, who painted the images of Shekhawati Sirdars and events from the native feudal life. In one of the Haveli, there are paintings depicting Shekhawati chiefs, while in the vault of the other Haveli there are scenes from the Ramayana and Hindu gods. The color pigments in the wall paintings of the later haveli vault have been remarkably preserved for more than 100 years now and look fresh.

Several of these havelis are facing neglect due to migration of their owners to other areas for the business. Havelis are of artistic excellence, academic and cultural significance, there is lack of awareness about their conservation or documentation by scholars.

== Culture ==
The population of the village is 8916 people and there are 4786 election voters of Gram Panchayat. The village is dominated by the Ahir Cast with Khosya Gotra. There are 1400 household of the Ahir cast. They are landlords and their main occupation is agriculture, They hold 80% of the agricultural land. The second cast which is Brahmin with majority of Sanwalodia Bhardwaj Gotra, who are approximately 120 families in number and have rest of the agricultural land. These two castes have ancestral agricultural land holding only, other castes, who reside in this village have no inherited land. They have only purchased land from others.

In other caste nearly 150 families are of SC (Chamar), 90 families are of Khati (carpenters), 40 families are of Dhanak, 50 families of Nai (Barbur), 50 families are of Kumhars (pot-makers), 40 families are of Banias (traders), 25 families are of Sunar (goldsmiths), 10 families are of Maniyar, 10 families are of Guwaria, 10 families are of Chhippis (Darji), and 5 families are of Walmiki, 2 family of jogi.

Before the 1947 partition of India there were Muslims who permanently migrated to Pakistan in 1947. They were Mirasi, Teli, Nai and Chhippi castes.

== Economy ==
The main occupation of the villagers is agriculture and its related works. Nearly half of the population depend upon agriculture. The land is sandy and unequal surface. There are many sand mounds. There was a scarcity of water for agriculture and drinking in village. The means of agriculture is drawing water through bore well. There is syndicate of canals in the area but water do not flow in them on time. Life is difficult.

Many people serve or have served in the Indian Army, other Indian Armed forces and Police. Many people teach in government and private schools. The Banias had ancestral business of commodities trade. Small shops are run by the other villagers for their livelihood. Others caste who are artisan do petty labor jobs.

In olden days the public was poor and even they had no pucca houses to live in up to independence of the country and only Banias and some influential people have Pucca house or Havely. But after independence, especially in the last 35 years, every household has a Pucca House to live in. After all average income is low due to lack of industrial and infrastructural development of the area.

== Religion ==
Only Hindus live in the village, so there are no churches or mosques. Muslims left the village at the time of India’s partition in 1947. An ancient temple is of Radha Krishan Mandir. Some acres of agricultural land which existed in the name of this temple were given to the temple's priest for his sustenance. There are so many temples in the village, it many be called a village of temples. There are three private mandirs, which were built by the Banias. The Banias made a temple and a well for drinking water. They made Pyawu (drinking water service). In other mandirs, Power House wala, Hanuman Mandir, on Mahendergarh Road, Kala Tal wala, Hanuman Mandir, Kalataal wala Mandir, Shyamji Mandir and Shiv Dhaam Mandir, etc.

The main temple is dedicated to Baba Kalia Toda, which is the name of the main deity of the village as well as a local hill with black stones. "Baba" means revered saint, "Kalia" means black, and "Toda" means stone or hill. On Saturday, villagers worship the deity here. There is a temple on the hill and a statue of Hanuman is being constructed. Annually, on the day of the Teej festival, a fair is held here.

== See also ==
- Madhogarh Fort, Haryana
- Dharampura Haveli
- Ghalib ki Haveli
