= Dilshad Colony =

- Neighborhood of Delhi
- Interactive map of Dilshad Colony
- Coordinates: 28°41′15″N 77°19′34″E
- Country: India
- State: Delhi
- District: North East Delhi

Languages
  - Official: Hindi, English
- Time zone: UTC+5:30 (IST)
- PIN: 110095

Dilshad Colony (Hindi: द‍िलशाद कालोनी) is a large housing colony situated in North East Delhi on Delhi border. It was developed by DLF.

Ward No. 217 Dilshad Colony in the Municipal Corporation of Delhi (MCD) is part of the Shahdara Assembly constituency and East Delhi Lok Sabha constituency. As of 2022, the ward population was 76,598.

== Education ==
The Nagar Nigam Pratibha Baalika Vidyalaya in Dilshad Colony was established in 1965. Run by the MCD, the school started a community engagement programme in April 2020, in response to the national COVID-19 lockdown. In 2023, it received international recognition as one of the Top 10 schools in the world for community collaboration, according to T4 Education in the United Kingdom.

== Infrastructure ==
It enjoys good connectivity. Adjacent there is Seemapuri DTC Bus Depot & Dilshad Garden Metro Station, approx. 1.5 Kilometres from the colony. There are 6 small hospitals/clinics inside the colony. It enjoys fresh water supply from Delhi Jal Board. It has one under ground reservoir(UGR) for daily water needs. Electricity supply is consistent in the area.

== Commerce and amenities ==
Many socio-cultural associations are active in the colony.

There are many grocery stores within the colony including a Kendriya Bhandar & Mother Diary outlet. Also fresh vegetable/fish/meat market is in the vicinity. A line of supermarkets/education/coaching centers/reputed schools exist in the colony and its proximity. For healthy lifestyle, there are branded/non branded gyms in the colony. Pet stores and veterinary clinics also operate from here. Parking is a huge problem in the colony, residents park their vehicle in front of buildings and due to which interior roads of the colony gets choked and affects smooth passage of vehicles coming in and out.

The main concern of this place is that there's no place to play cricket even there's a MCD school but the mla and other officials doesn't look into this issue which is a concern for growing kids.
