= Anil Laul =

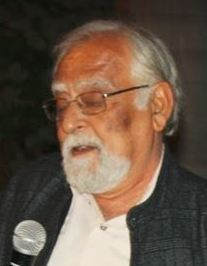
- Laul in 2013 at the launch of his book Green is Red
- Born: 6 August 1944; Amritsar
- Died: 5 July 2016 (aged 71); Delhi, India
- Citizenship: India
- Education: School of Planning and Architecture, Delhi
- Occupation: Architect
- Years active: Till 2016
- Organization(s): Founder of "Anangpur Building Centre"; Member of INTACH, Advisor to HUDCO and Delhi Urban Arts Commission
- Known for: Author of Green is Red; Cost effective low-energy sustainable green buildings; Earthquake resistant structures

Anil Laul (6 August 1944 – 5 July 2016) was an Indian architect and author of Green is Red, who worked on systems designs, primarily in development of Appropriate Building materials and technologies facilitating usage of locally available materials and empowering local human resources. He was a member of INTACH, and advisor to HUDCO and Delhi Urban Arts Commission, who also co-authored many housing policies of several states of India. He received several awards for his projects listed as UNCHS Good Practices. He was listed as a well-known architect of India in John T. Lang's book A Concise History of Modern Architecture in India. He wrote the book "Green is Red" and founded "Anangpur Building Centre" (ABC) in Faridabad, India to work independently on cost effective sustainable building materials, technologies and earthquake engineering. He conducted hands on workshops and trained several enthusiasts. Details of his inventions and projects can be found at www.anangpur.org

== Career ==
He is known for advocating green buildings, low cost sustainable housing based on local materials, pragmatic rehabilitation of slum dwellers, etc. He won international acclaim for inventing cost-effective technologies for sustainable development, including the inter-locking blocks used at Nalanda International School in Vadodara.

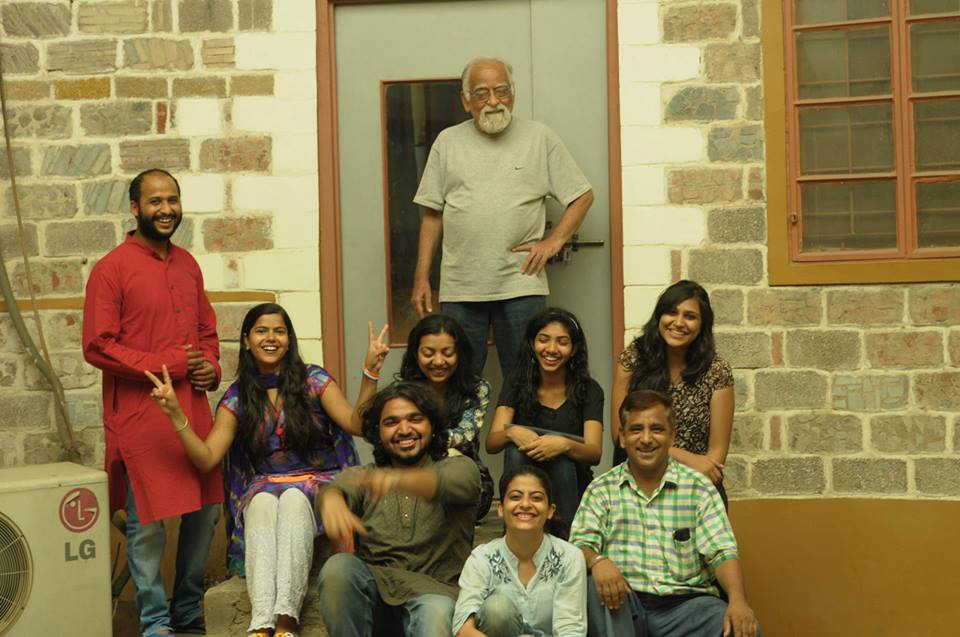
Anil Laul with Workshop Trainees during a Hands on Programme

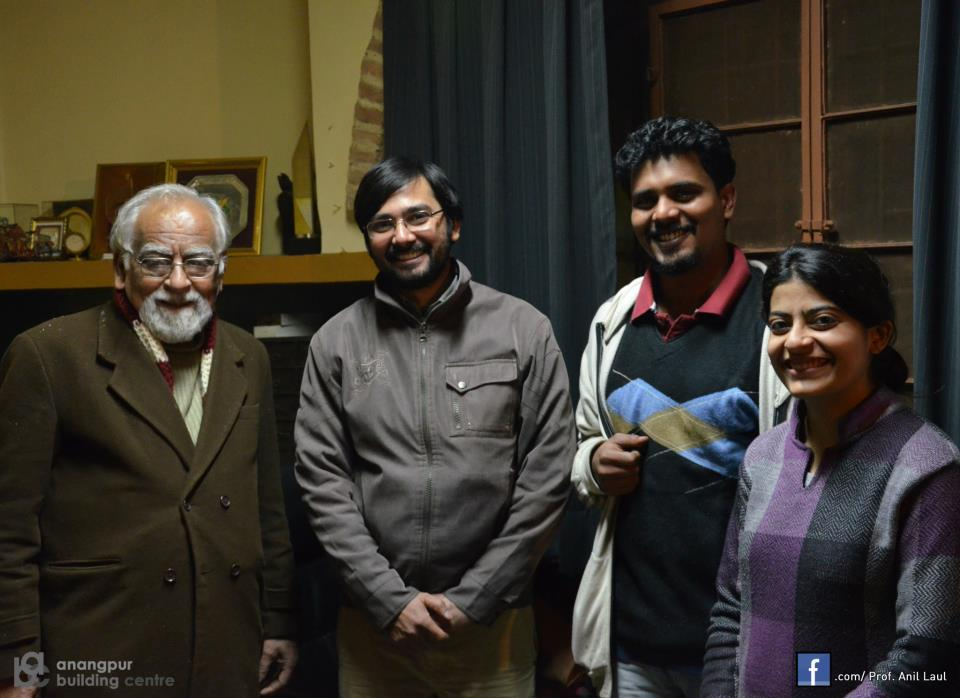
Anil Laul with his colleagues at his office in Anangpur

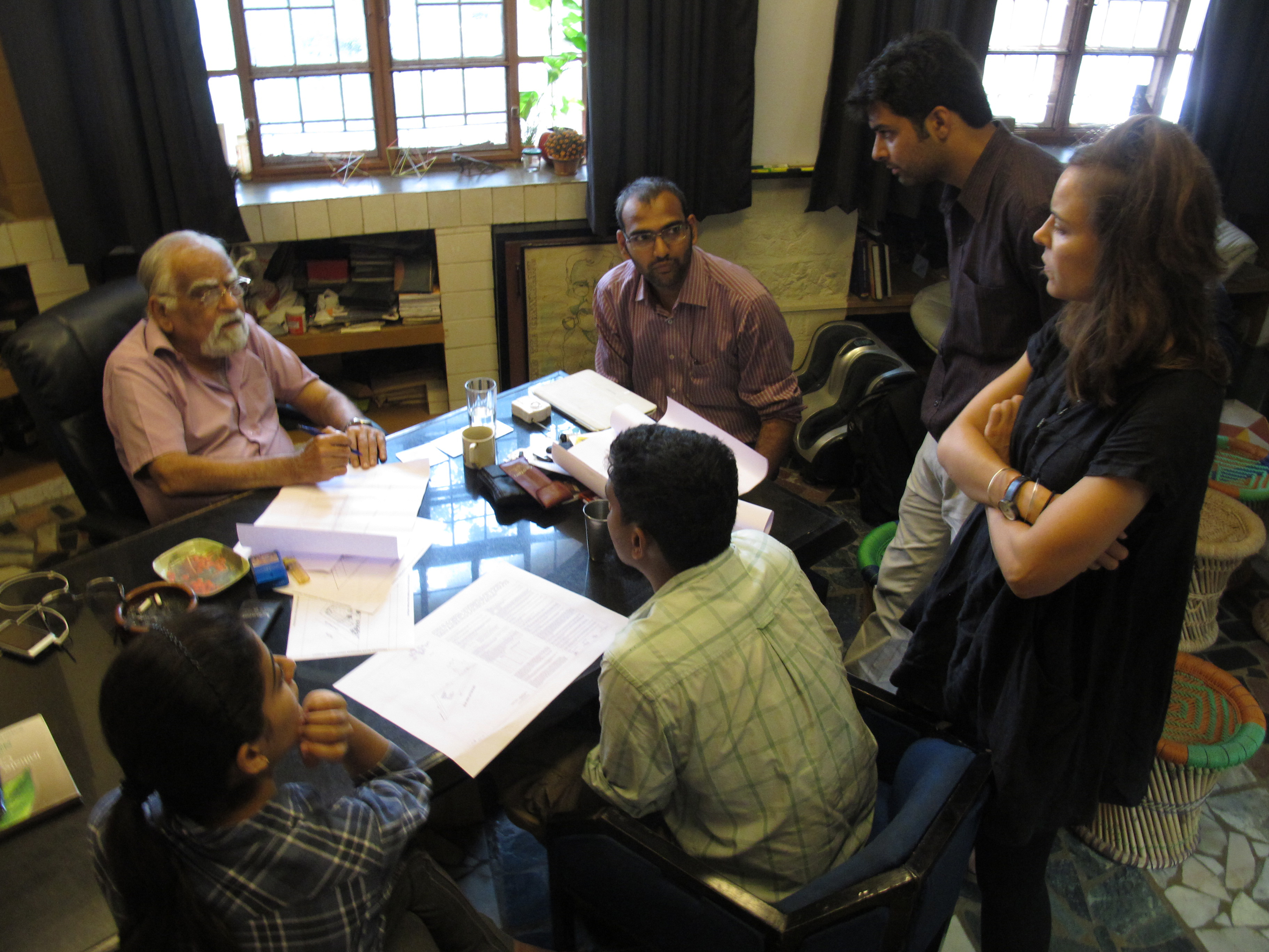
Anil Laul at his office in Anangpur

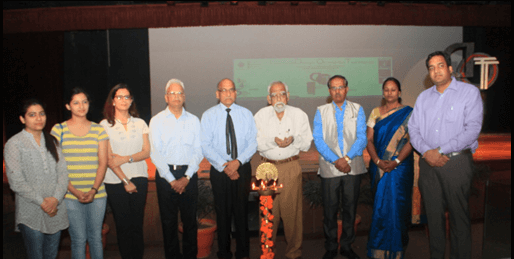
Anil Laul with his team at Lovely Professional University, Punjab

== Death ==
He died in Delhi on 5 July 2016. He was cremated at Lodhi Cemetery with a memorial held at Arya Samaj Mandir on 8 July 2016. With the help of his family, the centre was run by his right-hand person architect Tanya Pahwa, also co-author of the book "Green is Red" till March 2017.
