= 2021 in India =

- Centuries: 19th; 20th; 21st
- Decades: 2000s; 2010s; 2020s
- See also: List of years in India; Timeline of Indian history

Events in the year 2021 in India for real time basis.

== Incumbents ==
=== Government of India ===
Post	Name	
	President of India	Ram Nath Kovind
	Vice-President of India Chairman of Rajya Sabha	Venkaiah Naidu
	Prime Minister of India	Narendra Modi
	Chief Justice of India	Nuthalapati Venkata Ramana
	Speaker of the Lok Sabha	Om Birla
	Chief Election Commissioner of India	Sushil Chandra
	Chief of Defence Staff	Bipin Rawat ( Vacant since 8 December 2021)
	Lok Sabha	17th Lok Sabha

=== State Governments ===
State	Governor	Chief Minister	Political Alliance	Chief Justice	
Andhra Pradesh	Biswabhusan Harichandan	YS Jagan Mohan Reddy	Regional	Arup Kumar Goswami	
Arunachal Pradesh	B. D. Mishra	Pema Khandu	BJP	N.D.A.	Sudhanshu Dhulia (Gauhati High Court)
Assam	Jagdish Mukhi	Himanta Biswa Sarma	BJP	N.D.A.	Sudhanshu Dhulia (Gauhati High Court)
Bihar	Phagu Chauhan	Nitish Kumar	JD(U)	N.D.A.	Sanjay Karol (Patna High Court)
Chhattisgarh	Anusuiya Uikey	Bhupesh Baghel	INC	U.P.A.	P. R. Ramachandra Menon
Goa	PS Sreedharan Pillai	Pramod Sawant	BJP	N.D.A.	Dipankar Datta
Gujarat	Acharya Dev Vrat	Bhupendra Patel	BJP	N.D.A.	Vikram Nath
Haryana	Bandaru Dattatreya	Manohar Lal Khattar	BJP	N.D.A.	Ravi Shankar Jha
Himachal Pradesh	Rajendra Vishwanath Arlekar	Jai Ram Thakur	BJP	N.D.A.	L. Narayana Swamy
Jharkhand	Draupadi Murmu	Hemant Soren	JMM	U.P.A.	Ravi Ranjan
Karnataka	Thawar Chand Gehlot	Basavaraj Bommai	BJP	N.D.A.	Ritu Raj Awasthi
Kerala	Arif Mohammad Khan	Pinarayi Vijayan	CPI(M)	Regional	S. Manikumar
Madhya Pradesh	Lalji Tandon	Shivraj Singh Chouhan	BJP	N.D.A.	Mohammad Rafiq
Maharashtra	Bhagat Singh Koshyari	Uddhav Thackeray	Shivsena	U.P.A.	Dipankar Datta
Manipur	Najma Heptulla	N. Biren Singh	BJP	N.D.A.	Ramalingam Sudhakar
Meghalaya	Ganga Prasad	Conrad Sangma	NPP	N.D.A.	Biswanath Somadder
Mizoram	Nirbhay Sharma	Zoramthanga	MNF	N.D.A.	Sudhanshu Dhulia
Nagaland	Padmanabha Acharya	Neiphiu Rio	NDPP	N.D.A.	Sudhanshu Dhulia
Odisha	Ganeshi Lal	Naveen Patnaik	BJD	Regional	S. Muralidhar
Punjab	V. P. Singh Badnore	Bhagwant Mann	Aam Admi Party (AAP)	Regional	Ravi Shankar Jha
Rajasthan	Kalraj Mishra	Ashok Gehlot	INC	U.P.A.	Indrajit Mahanty
Sikkim	Shriniwas Patil	Prem Singh Tamang	SKM	N.D.A.	Jitendra Kumar Maheshwari
Tamil Nadu	R. N. Ravi	M. K. Stalin	DMK	U.P.A.	
Telangana	Tamilisai Soundararajan	K. Chandrashekar Rao	TRS	Federal Front	Hima Kohli
Tripura	Tathagata Roy	Biplab Kumar Deb	BJP	N.D.A.	Akil Kureshi
Uttar Pradesh	Anandiben Patel	Yogi Adityanath	BJP	N.D.A.	Govind Mathur
Uttarakhand	Baby Rani Maurya	Pushkar Singh Dhami	BJP	N.D.A.	Raghvendra Singh Chauhan
West Bengal	Jagdeep Dhankhar	Mamata Banerjee	AITC	Federal Front	Prakash Shrivastava

== Events ==
=== January.. ===
- 1 January – India begins its two-year tenure (2021–22) as a non-permanent member of the UNSC.
- 2 January – India approves two coronavirus vaccines, Bharat Biotech's "Covaxin" and the Oxford/AstraZeneca "Covishield", for emergency use. Experts raised questions over the efficacy of Covaxin and a lack of transparency in trials.
- 3 January - Former Indian national cricket team captain Sourav Ganguly suffered a mild cardiac arrest. Social media criticism rose against Adani Wilmar Group's Fortune Edible Oil brand's healthy heart advertisement campaign of which Ganguly is a brand ambassador. The company pulled down the advertisements featuring Ganguly following the criticism and trolls.
- 4 January – Instant messaging app WhatsApp announced a new amendment in their privacy policies and data sharing norms. This led to massive outrage against the app and an exodus to alternative applications by users in India. The announcement that WhatsApp will share data with their parent company Facebook led to a surge in the user bases of applications like Signal.
- 12 January – The Supreme Court issues a stay order thereby suspending the implementation of the three new farm laws in the wake of the ongoing farmer protests.
- 14 January – Former NDTV journalist Nidhi Razdan announced that she fell prey to a serious phishing attack in 2020 that came as a job offer for a teaching position at Harvard University.
- 16 January –
  - The Indian Government begins a mass vaccination campaign for COVID-19. The vaccine for preventing COVID-19 is prepared by Bharat Biotech.
  - A 500-page transcript of WhatsApp chat between Arnab Goswami and former Broadcast Audience Research Council CEO Partho Dasgupta was leaked to media. The transcripts revealed that Arnab Goswami was privy to top secret information regarding 2019 Balakot airstrike and 2019 Pulwama attack. It also carried derogatory remarks made by Arnab Goswami on political activists, opposition leaders, media persons like Navika Kumar, celebrity like Kangana Ranaut etc.
- 21 January
  - Five people are killed in a fire at the Serum Institute of India Building, Pune.
- 26 January – The 72nd Republic Day Parade took place in New Delhi. Owing to the COVID-19 pandemic, no foreign head of state served as the chief guest. The Prime Minister of the United Kingdom, Boris Johnson, cancelled his appearance due to the pandemic. A massive tractor rally took place in Delhi as part of the farmers' protest against new farm bills. There was ensuing violence and a serious law and order situation that followed the rally, and the Delhi Police alleged that an illegal flag hoisting took place at Red Fort by Deep Sidhu. There were massive crack down by security agencies on farmers, journalists, etc. followed by internet shutdowns in Delhi.

=== February ===
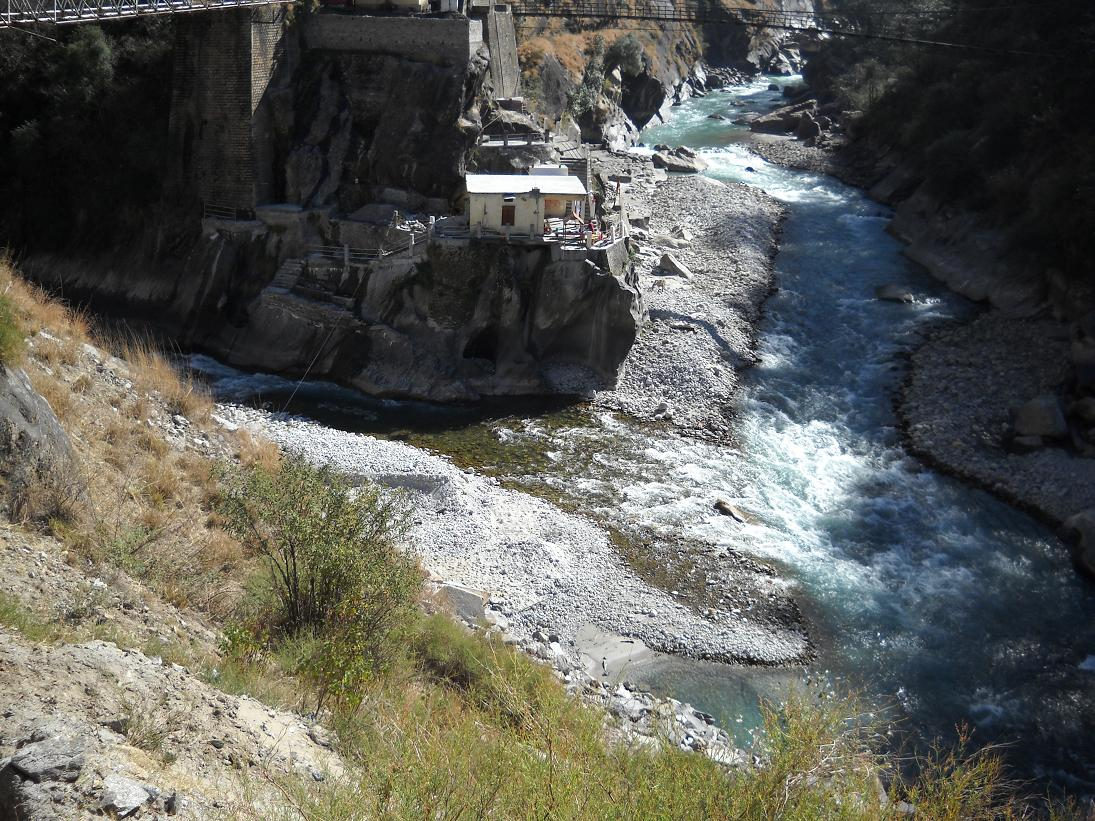
2021 Uttarakhand flood

- 7 February – 2021 Uttarakhand flood.
- 13 February – A 6.3 magnitude earthquake occurred in Tajikistan. Tremors were felt in parts of North India, including Delhi.
- 14 February – A 22 year old Indian environmentalist from Bangalore, Disha Ravi, was arrested by the Delhi Police on sedition charges. The police alleged that Ravi edited and circulated a document (toolkit) tweeted by Greta Thunberg relating to the 2020–2021 Indian farmers' protest.
- 23 February - A Delhi court granted bail to Disha Ravi, citing the toolkit she shared as 'innocuous'.
- 24 February – The Motera cricket stadium in Ahmedabad was renamed as Narendra Modi Stadium. It is the world largest cricket stadium with a seating capacity of 132,000.

=== March ===
- 4 March – Heavily polluted Bellandur Lake in Bangalore catches fire.
- 20 March – Dattatreya Hosabale is elected as the General Secretary of Rashtriya Swayamsevak Sangh.
- 26 March – 2021 Mumbai hospital fire.

=== April ===
- 1 April – The Gujarat Assembly amends the Freedom of Religion Act, 2003, bringing in stringent provisions against forcible conversion through marriage or allurement, with the intention of targeting "love jihad". Gujarat became the 3rd state to do so, after Uttar Pradesh and Madhya Pradesh passed similar bills in 2020.
- 3 April – 2021 Sukma-Bijapur attack.
- 8 April – A French online journal Mediapart came out with an investigative journalism piece on the Rafale deal controversy, based on an investigation by the French anti-corruption agency Agence Francaise Anticorruption (AFA). In the report, Mediapart alleged that the jet manufacturer had paid nearly one million Euros to an Indian middleman.
- 15 April – Adani Ports & SEZ removed from S&P Dow Jones Sustainability Indices due to links and shared financial interests that group have with Tatmadaw that carried out 2021 Myanmar coup d'état.
- 23 April –
  - Virar hospital fire.
  - A viral video emerged from Madhya Pradesh's Vidisha, showing a dead body falling off a running ambulance draws criticism.
- 24 April – 25 COVID-19 patients die in Jaipur Golden Hospital, Delhi after the hospital runs out of their oxygen supply.
- 27 April – The total number of deaths due to COVID-19 in the country cross 2 lakh. However, this is the official figure, with gross amounts of under-reporting suspected.
- 28 April – 2021 Assam earthquake.
- 29 April – A Supreme Court of India bench presided by Justice Uday U. Lalit refused a Central Bureau of Investigation probe on the controversial death of Chief Minister of Arunachal Pradesh Kalikho Pul.
- 30 April - A Special Bench of Justices Dhananjaya Y. Chandrachud, L. Nageswara Rao and Shripathi Ravindra Bhat warned State governments and police against clamping down on the spread of information or calls for help through social media from citizens affected by the COVID-19 pandemic in India. The bench also questioned lack of equity in vaccine pricing in India.

=== May ===
- 1 May - Bharuch hospital fire.
- 2 May - In a joint statement, opposition party leaders asked the Union government to focus all its attention on ensuring uninterrupted oxygen supply to hospitals across the country.
- 4 May -
  - Twitter permanently suspends the account of Kangana Ranaut for hateful posts about the post poll violence in West Bengal.
  - Delhi High Court issues show cause notice for contempt of court to Government of India on grounds of not meeting court's direction to supply requisite Oxygen for hospitals in Delhi.
- 5 May – Supreme Court of India strikes down the Maharashtra State Reservation for Socially and Educationally Backward Classes (SEBC) Act, 2018 which extends reservation to the Maratha community in public education and employment and upheld the Indra Sawhney & Others v. Union of India verdict and One Hundred and Second Amendment of the Constitution of India.
- 6 May – Union Minister V. Muraleedharan's convoy attacked at West Bengal.
- 10 May – Nearly 150 decomposed and bloated Human Dead bodies were found floating in River Ganges at Chausa, Buxar district, Bihar. It is believed that these bodies belonged to under-reported death cases of COVID-19 pandemic from neighboring state of Uttar Pradesh.
- 12 May –
  - Thousands of dead bodies are found floating or washing up the shore of the river Ganges. The corpses also include people that died due to COVID-19.
  - In a joint letter to Prime Minister of India, Narendra Modi, twelve opposition parties urged the government to start a free universal mass vaccination program in India. The letter also urged Modi to repeal the farm bills, scrap the Central Vista Redevelopment Project and provide food grains to people.

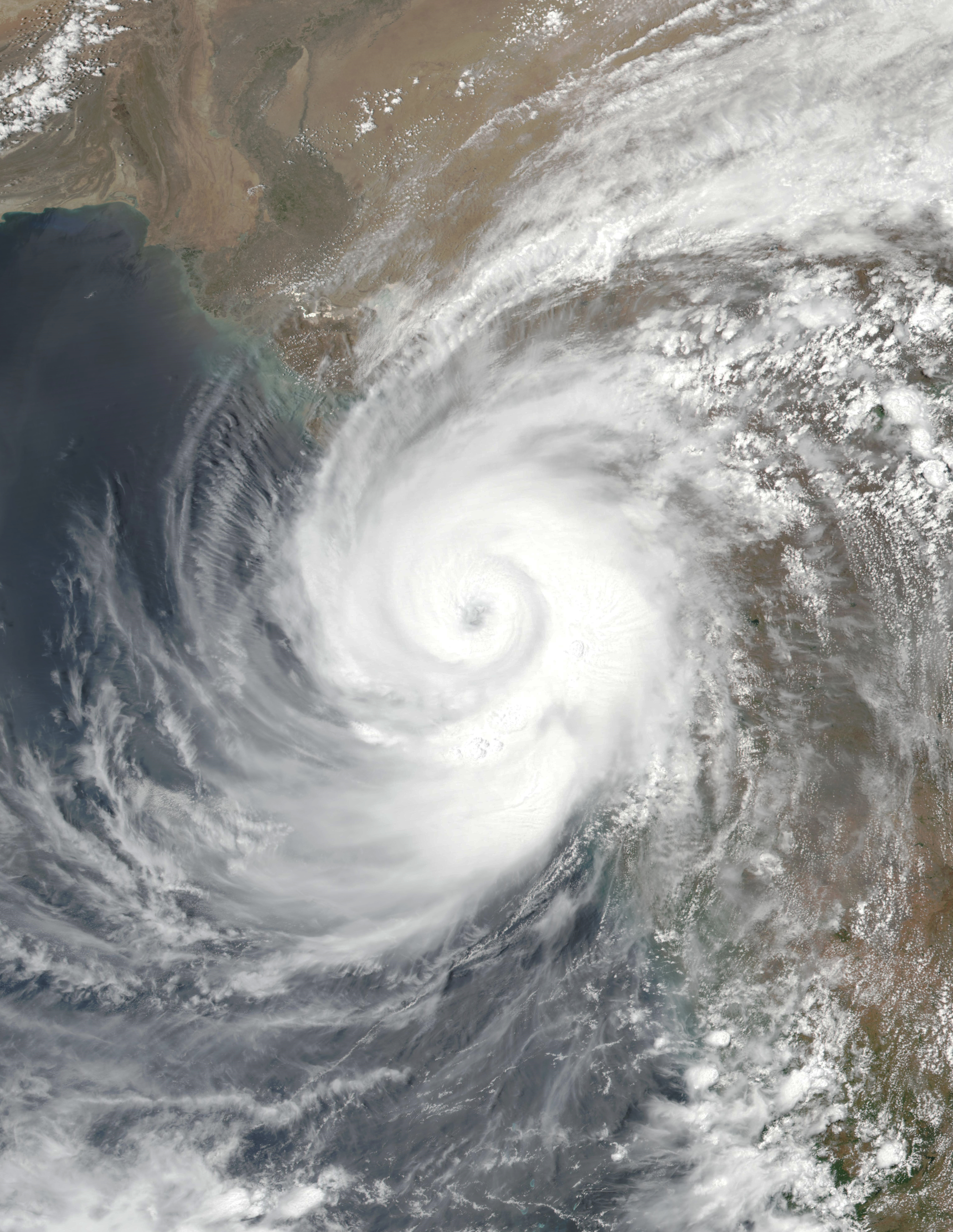
Cyclone Tauktae

- 17 May -
  - Cyclone Tauktae hits India, resulting in at least 90 deaths.
  - More than 70 people die due to the capsizing of two barges, P-305 and Gal Contractor, housing crew involved in works at the Oil and Natural Gas Corporation's Mumbai High Field. The accident happened because the barge contractor ignored Cyclone Tauktae warnings issued by the India Meteorological Department.
- 21 May
  - It was reported that Air India was subjected to a cyberattack whereas the personal details of about 4.5 million customers around the world were compromised, including passports, credit card details, birth dates, names and ticket information.
  - 13 Maoists killed in Gadchiroli, Maharashtra in an operation carried out by C-60 commandos.
- 23 May – Fugitive Indian diamond trader Mehul Choksi, who committed the Punjab National Bank Scam, is arrested in Dominica.
- 25 May – Protests in Lakshadweep against Union territory administrator Praful Khoda Patel by the Save Lakshadweep campaign intensified following controversial decisions and laws passed by Patel. His decision to shut all dairy farms on the island, ban beef on the Muslim majority island, remove non-vegetarian food items from Midday Meals provided in schools, implement the Goonda act (Anti-social Activities Regulation Bill, 2021) in islands with 'zero criminal cases' to crack down dissent against the Citizenship Amendment Act, shift the islands logistics from Cochin Port and Beypore port to New Mangalore Port, violation of COVID-19 protocols etc. raised sentiments against the administrator on the island.
- 26 May – Very Severe Cyclonic Storm Yaas affects Odisha and West Bengal.
- 28 May – Lakshadweep administration issues an order to deploy government officials in fishing boats. The decision invited huge outcry and criticism.
- 29 May – An audio clip of a telephone conversation between social activist H.M. Santhosh and staff of A.V. Hospital Basavanagudi surfaces in the media. In light of the audio clip, the Karnataka Congress alleged a "vaccine selling scam" against L. A. Ravi Subramanya, Member of the Legislative Assembly from Basavanagudi (Vidhana Sabha constituency) who is the uncle of Tejasvi Surya.
- 31 May – West Bengal Chief secretary Alapan Bandyopadhyay, who was trapped in an appointment tussle between the Union government and the Government of West Bengal, resigned.

=== June ===
- 1 June –
  - Union Education Minister Ramesh Pokhriyal was admitted to AIIMS, Delhi due to post-Covid complications.
  - Amul vice chairman Valamji R Humbal urged Prime Minister Narendra Modi to ban Non-governmental organization People for the Ethical Treatment of Animals in India alleging conspiracy following remarks made by PETA to promote Milk substitute in country.
- 4 June – Delhi High Court dismissed a lawsuit filed by Juhi Chawla against setting up of 5G Cellular network in India and imposed a Rs. 20 Lakh fine for abusing the process of law.
- 7 June – June 2021 Pune fire.
- 11 June –
  - Media reports that Government of India may not allow 4 Kerala women who have joined Islamic State of Iraq and the Levant – Khorasan Province to return to India.
  - The Economic Offence Wing of Tamil Nadu Police arrests Infrastructure Leasing & Financial Services (IL&FS) former chairman Ravi Parthasarathi in connection with a criminal breach of trust of Rs. 200 crore done by an (IL&FS) subsidiary to a Chennai based firm.
- 13 June – Aam Aadmi Party Member of Parliament, Rajya Sabha, Sanjay Singh and Pawan Pandey from Samajwadi Party alleged that there were financial irregularities that occurred in the purchase of land for the Ram Mandir, Ayodhya by Shri Ram Janmabhoomi Teerth Kshetra Trust. The politicians alleged that on March 18, 2021, the trust purchased two different plots on same day at two different rates; one transaction appeared manipulated and intended to divert funds.
- 14 June – Following a tweet by Journalist Sucheta Dalal made on June 12 and decision by National Securities Depository Limited to freeze three Foreign portfolio investment funds based in Port Louis, Mauritius shares of Adani Group companies fell by 5 – 25%.
- 17 June –
  - Student activists from Pinjra Tod Natasha Narwal and Devangana Kalita, along with Asif Iqbal Tanha from Jamia Millia Islamia were released from Tihar Jail on Thursday, hours after a trial court ordered their immediate release. They were in custody since May 2020, in relation to a case related to the violence in 2020 Delhi riots following the Citizenship Amendment Act protests. The trial court order came because the activists who were granted bail by Delhi High Court on June 15 were not released even after 36 hours.
  - Press Trust of India reports on the basis of data compiled from Swiss National Bank that, funds parked by Indian individuals and firms in Swiss banks rose to a 13 year high of 2.55 billion Swiss franc (over Rs 20,700 crore INR) in 2020. Interestingly amidst this spike, customer account deposits witnessed a dip while money deposited through bonds, securities and other financial instruments rose sharply.
- 22 June
  - A meeting of opposition leaders under the banner of Rashtra Manch (National Forum) met in the residence of Sharad Pawar in Delhi. The group put forward an alternate vision of anti – BJP third front in India for 2021 elections in India. There were leaders from All India Trinamool Congress, Aam Aadmi Party, Rashtriya Lok Dal, Nationalist Congress Party who were present in the event. There were no leaders from Indian National Congress, Dravida Munnetra Kazhagam or Communist Party of India (Marxist). The veteran BJP leader and Trinamool leader Yashwant Sinha who was present in the event said that Manch will remain as a non political action group for the moment. The meeting of leaders took place after meetings between Prashant Kishor and Sharad Pawar earlier this month.
  - Kerala High Court issued an interim stay on two controversial orders of Lakshadweep administration on Animal husbandry (closure of dairy farms) and Midday Meal Scheme (exclusion of Non-vegetarian items from menu).
- 23 June – Enforcement Directorate transferred assets worth ₹8,441.50 crore to public sector banks. The banks suffered losses to the tune of ₹22,585.83 crore due to frauds committed by Vijay Mallya, Nirav Modi and Mehul Choksi. Thus the total assets transferred to the bank worth Rs 9,041.5 crore, representing 40% of the total loss to the banks. The total attachments and assets seized by Enforcement Directorate amounts to Rs 18,170.02 crore which included assets of Rs 969 crore located in foreign countries. The quantum of the attached and seized assets represents 80.45% of the total bank loss of Rs. 22,585.83 crore.
- 24 June – Narendra Modi and Amit Shah meets political leaders from Jammu and Kashmir all main leaders from People's Alliance for Gupkar Declaration attended the meeting. PM Modi gives signals regarding elections and restoration of statehood.
- 25 June
  - M. C. Josephine, Kerala Women's Commission chairperson, resigned following public backlash on her remarks to a woman complaining of domestic violence on June 23 in a live TV show telecasted on Manorama News.
  - Kerala High Court issued Anticipatory bail to Lakshadweep based film maker, Aisha Sultana, against whom sedition charges were imposed on 10 June following a remark made by her against Union territory administrator Praful Khoda Patel, by calling him 'Bio weapon' in a news debate that happened on a Malayalam news channel, MediaOne TV.
- 27 June – European Union excludes anti-COVID-19 vaccine Covishield from 'Green Pass' list.
- 28 June – Qatar's Special Envoy of the State of Qatar for Counterterrorism and Mediation of Conflict Resolution, Mutlaq bin Majed Al Qahtani made a statement in a web conference that Indian officials have entered into talks with Talibans political leadership based in Doha.

=== July ===
- 1 July - Nine European countries which includes Switzerland, Estonia and 7 European Union member states such as Austria, Germany, Slovenia, Greece, Iceland, Ireland & Spain have given recognition to the Covishield vaccine produced by the Serum Institute of India as EU started 'Green Pass' facility. In the meantime EU member Germany however has a travel ban in place for Indians as India has been recognized as a "virus variant country".
- 4 July – Pushkar Singh Dhami is elected as the 11th Chief Minister of Uttarakhand. He is the youngest chief Minister of the state and is the third chief Minister within the 4th Uttarakhand Assembly.
- 5 July – Jesuit priest and tribal rights activist, Stan Swamy who was arrested in connection with 2018 Bhima Koregaon violence in October 2020, died in custody at Mumbai. He was the oldest political prisoner in India.
- 6 July – Government of India creates new ministry named Ministry of Co-operation to strengthen the Cooperative movement in India.
- 7 July – massive reshuffle in the Union Council of Ministers of Second Modi ministry. Twelve existing ministers including Ministry of Health and Family Welfare Harsh Vardhan, Minister of Law and Justice Ravi Shankar Prasad, Prakash Javadekar, D. V. Sadananda Gowda resigns. There are 43 new faces inducted into the ministry including Ashwini Vaishnaw, Jyotiraditya Scindia, Rajeev Chandrasekhar, Sarbananda Sonowal etc. There was elevation in ranks to few existing ministers such as Mansukh L. Mandaviya, Kiren Rijiju, Anurag Thakur etc.
- 8 July – violence erupts in 12 districts of Uttar Pradesh during filing of the nominations for elections to Panchayat Samiti (Kshethra Panchayats). A video of a woman Samajwadi Party member being assaulted in Lakhimpur Kheri district becomes viral in social media and invited criticism.
- 9 July – External Affairs Minister, S. Jaishankar handed over a relic belonging to Ketevan the Martyr, a royal from the 17th-century, that was preserved in Church of St. Augustine, Goa to the Government of Georgia as part of his two-day visit to the country.
- 11 July – An unconfirmed report in a Tamil daily about the Union government's plan to divide Tamil Nadu and create Kongu Nadu as a Union territory sparked row in Tamil Nadu. The report draw cue from a list of newly appointed ministers published by BJP, where L. Murugan, was mentioned as hailing from Kongu Nadu. All major political party except Bharatiya Janata Party denounced the idea of splitting Tamil Nadu.
- 14 July – The Supreme Court of India takes suo moto case on Uttar Pradesh's decision to go ahead with Kanwar Yatra despite apprehensions about a third wave of COVID-19 pandemic in India.
- 15 July – as part of hearings on Public interest litigation challenging the constitutional validity of Section 124A of the Indian Penal Code, Supreme Court of India expressed concern over its widespread misuse and lack of accountability of invoking sedition law. The court sought center's response regarding necessity to retain this colonial law.
- 18 July
  - 2021 Mumbai landslide
  - A leaked database of an Israeli surveillance technology firm NSO Group that sells a spyware called Pegasus (spyware) was accessed by a Paris-based media nonprofit Forbidden Stories and Amnesty International. The database contained data of government clients of Pegasus (spyware) since 2016. The non profit group worked on this data through an international collaborative journalism of 17 media groups from 10 countries including The Wire (India), Le Monde, The Guardian, The Washington Post, Süddeutsche Zeitung etc. The Indian media partner in the group, The Wire reveals that the data contains more than 300 Indians who were under surveillance through Pegasus. This includes 40 journalists, opposition politicians, a supreme court judge, activists, two ministers of Modi ministry, an Election Commissioner etc. The prominent people who figured in Pegasus surveillance according to the data were Rahul Gandhi, Prashant Kishor, Ashok Lavasa, Ranjan Gogoi, Ashwini Vaishnaw etc. The Prime Minister's Office denied the allegations citing they are baseless and lack concrete evidence.
- 19 July – Raj Kundra, the spouse of Shilpa Shetty arrested by Mumbai Police on charges of making pornographic content and publishing it through mobile application named Hotshot.
- 20 July – In an answer to the Rajya Sabha, to an unstarred question raised by K. C. Venugopal, Bharati Pawar, Minister of State of Ministry of Health and Family Welfare said, that there were no deaths due to lack of oxygen in India during the second wave.
- 22 July
  - Income Tax Department conducted raids on Dainik Bhaskar media group.
  - 2021 Maharashtra floods begin
- 23 July – Indian Food delivery company Zomato Initial public offering list in stock market at a premium of 53% over issue price.
- 24 July – Indian weightlifter Saikhom Mirabai Chanu won Olympic silver medal in 2020 Summer Olympics held at Tokyo.
- 25 July – Ramappa Temple in Telangana gets UNESCO World Heritage Site tag.
- 26 July –
  - B. S. Yediyurappa resigns as chief minister of Karnataka.
  - Almost five Assam Police personnel at Cachar district killed as a result of violent clashes between Mizoram Police and Assam Police along the state border following a border dispute.
- 28 July – Basavaraj Bommai, Lingayat leader and son of former chief minister S. R. Bommai takes oath as chief minister of Karnataka.

=== August ===
- 1 Aug –
  - Indian player P. V. Sindhu won Olympic bronze medal in 2020 Summer Olympics held at Tokyo. Becoming the first women athlete and second athlete after Sushil Kumar to win two Olympic medals in Olympics for India.
  - a 9 year old Dalit girl was allegedly raped by four men including a Hindu priest and crematorium workers on her way to fetch water. The girl's corpse was forcefully cremated at a crematorium in South West Delhi district by the miscreants.
- 4 Aug –
  - Indian Boxer Lovlina Borgohain, won Olympic bronze medal in 2020 Summer Olympics held at Tokyo in Welterweight category.
  - Indian Women Hockey team player Vandana Katariya's family was abused with caste slurs by upper caste men in Haridwar following the team losing game with Argentina.
  - Flood like situation in Sindh River and Chambal River basin areas in Kota division, Rajasthan and North western Madhya Pradesh.
  - Heavy rains combined with release of water from Maithon Dam, Damodar Valley Corporation results in floods in 300 villages in Hooghly district, West Bengal claiming 23 lives.
- 5 Aug –
  - India men's national field hockey team won Olympic bronze medal in 2020 Summer Olympics held at Tokyo.
  - Indian Wrestler, Ravi Kumar Dahiya won Olympic silver medal in 2020 Summer Olympics held at Tokyo.
- 6 Aug –
  - Rajiv Gandhi Khel Ratna Award renamed as Major Dhyan Chand Khel Ratna Award by Prime Minister of India.
  - Indian Women Hockey team lost the bronze medal match against United Kingdom in 2020 Summer Olympics held at Tokyo.
  - Rabia Saif, a twenty year old Civil defense volunteer cum whistleblower brutally murdered and mutilated.
- 7 Aug – Indian athlete Neeraj Chopra won Olympic gold medal in Javelin throw and Indian Wrestler Bajrang Punia won Olympic bronze medal in 2020 Summer Olympics held at Tokyo and India made its highest medal tally in an Olympics with 7 medals.
- 10 Aug – Lok Sabha passes the 127th Constitutional amendment bill, which restores states power to make their own Other Backward Class lists and reverses Supreme Court of India's May 5, 2021 verdict on Maratha quota.
- 11 Aug –
  - Twitter locked official page of Indian National Congress and its five major leaders such as Ajay Maken, Randeep Surjewala etc. following the gag on Rahul Gandhi's official handle.
  - The Lok Sabha and Rajya Sabha ended their monsoon sessions sine die ahead of the scheduled date. There was rumpus in Rajya Sabha between Members of Parliament and marshals following oppositions protests for passing key bills such as General Insurance bill without debate or discussion. The monsoon session was less productive with Lok Sabha working just 19% of its scheduled time and Rajya Sabha working 26%. The lack of consensus between opposition and ruling party resulted in passing of twenty crucial bills (law) without discussion and parliament evading discussion over important issues such as COVID-19 pandemic in India, farm laws, Pegasus (spyware), Ladakh etc.
- 14 Aug – The Assam Assembly passed a bill that prohibits the slaughter or sale of beef within a 5-km radius of any temple. The legislation seeks to ensure that permission for slaughter is not granted to areas that are predominantly inhabited by Hindu, Jain, Sikh and other non-beef eating communities or places that fall within a 5-km radius of a temple, satra and any other institution as may be prescribed by the authorities. Exemptions, however, might be granted for certain religious occasions.
- 21 Aug - All Tribal Students Union Manipur (ATSUM) calls for 24 hour shutdown in hill districts of Manipur for protesting against Manipur Legislative Assembly which did not bring Manipur (Hill areas) Autonomous District Council Bill, 2021 in its monsoon session.
- 23 Aug - Finance minister of India announced National Monetisation Pipeline (NMP) to sell assets worth Rs. 6 trillion in next four years. This includes Indian Railways assets worth Rs. 1.52 trillion, National highways assets worth Rs. 1.6 trillion, power transmission assets worths Rs. 45,000 crores, warehousing assets worth Rs. 28,900 crores etc.
- 24 Aug - An MBA student from University of Mysore aged 23 years gang raped near Chamundi Hills, Mysore.
- 27 Aug – Bharatiya Janata Party politician and former Member of Parliament, Rajya Sabha, La. Ganesan appointed as Governor of Manipur.
- 28 Aug –
  - Haryana Police's baton charge on farmers who protested at Karnal in a BJP meeting venue as part of 2020–2021 Indian farmers' protest left ten protesters seriously injured. A video of SDM of district instructing police to break head of protesters invites criticism.
  - Ministry of Road Transport and Highways introduced new Bharat (BH) series vehicle registration in India.
- 29 Aug – In 2020 Summer Paralympics held at Tokyo, Indian Parathlete Bhavina Patel won silver medal in Table tennis, N.K. Nishad Kumar won silver in High jump and V.K. Vinod Kumar won bronze medal in Discus throw.
- 30 Aug –
  - In 2020 Summer Paralympics held at Tokyo, Indian Parathlete Avani Lekhara and Sumit Antil won gold medal in women's 10m air rifle standing and men's javelin throw (F64). Avani Lekhara became the first Indian woman to win a gold medal at the Paralympics. In javelin throw F46 Devendra Jhajharia won silver medal and Sundar Singh Gurjar won bronze medal. IN F56 discus throw Yogesh Kathuniya won silver medal.
  - V.K. Vinod Kumar stripped of bronze medal in F52 discus throw by a panel after he was found not meeting the Paralympics criteria.

=== September ===
- 11 Sept – Chief Minister of Gujarat, Vijay Rupani announces resignation from the post.
- 18 Sept –
  - Sanjay Pugalia joins Adani Group to lead groups media initiatives.
  - Amarinder Singh resigns as Chief Minister of Punjab (India).
- 19 Sept – Directorate of Revenue Intelligence has impounded two containers carrying about 2,988.22 kg of Heroin heading from Afghanistan at Mundra Port in Gujarat. It is deemed as one of the largest drug seizures by an enforcement agency in world to date.
- 20 Sept –
  - An eviction drive by Government of Assam as part of Garukhuthi Project at Sipajhar, Darrang district turns violent. The videos of policemen firing on unarmed persons and a government-appointed photographer attacking an injured person surfaces and invites criticism.
  - Charanjit Singh Channi assumes office as List of chief ministers of Punjab. He is the first dalit chief minister of the state.
- 23 Sept – Two villagers died and 20 police men injured in violence at Dholpur and Garukhuti in Sipajhar, Darrang district following an eviction drive.

=== October ===
- 2 Oct – Eight people including Shah Rukh Khan's son Aryan khan arrested by Narcotics Control Bureau following a drug bust and raid conducted on a cruise vessel named Cordelia chartered between Mumbai and Goa.
- 3 Oct – International Consortium of Investigative Journalists began publishing Pandora Papers and around 380 Indians named in the leaks and it includes Sachin Tendulkar, Anil Ambani, Satish Sharma, Niira Radia, Jackie Shroff, Jackie Shroff, Harish Salve, Nirav Modi-Purvi Modi etc.
- 4 Oct – In the Lakhimpur Kheri massacre, eight people including four farmers killed in Lakhimpur Kheri district as Union Minister Ajay Kumar Mishra's son's car runs over protesters who were part of 2020–2021 Indian farmers' protest.
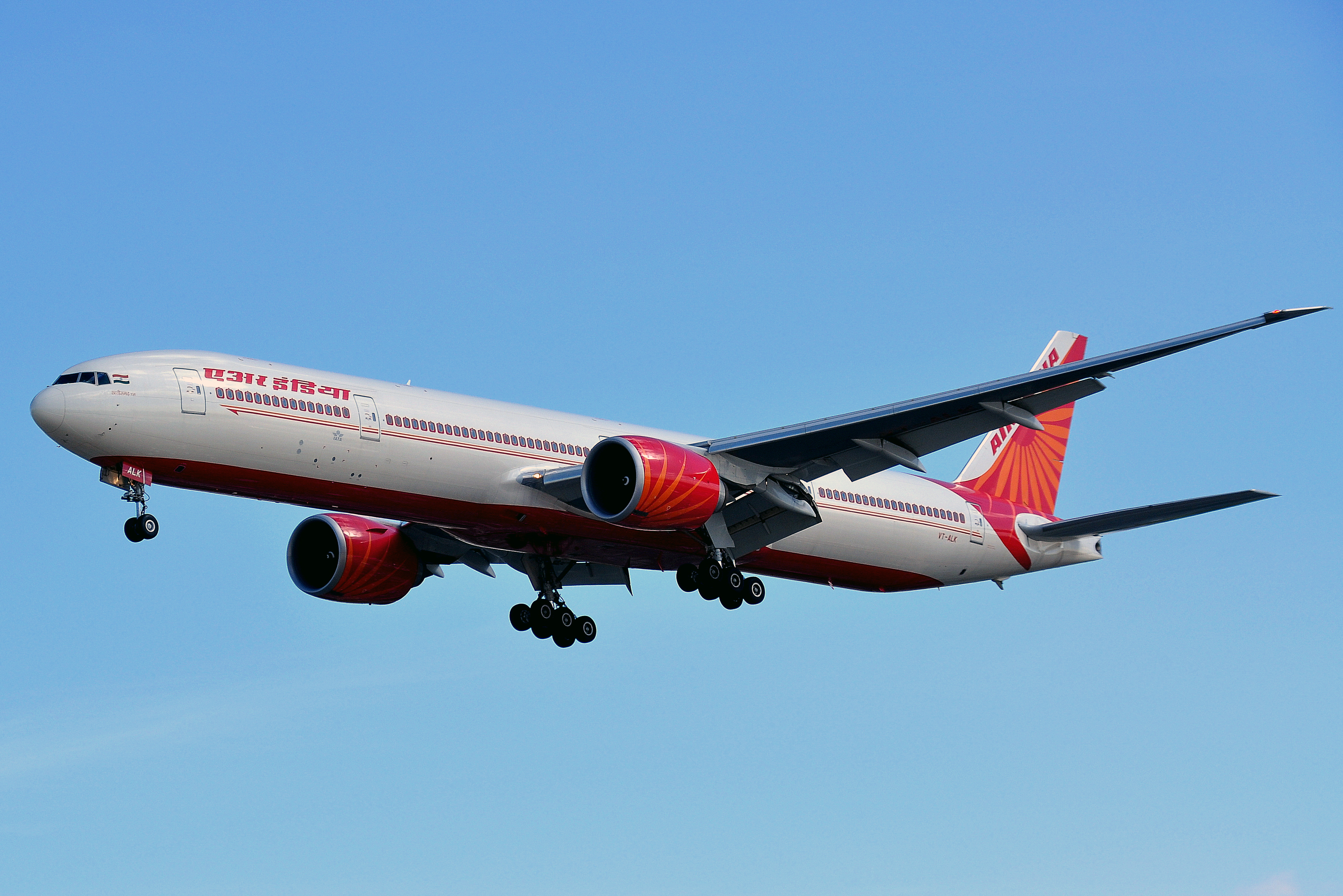
- Air India deal
  8 Oct – Tata Group gets nod to acquire 100% stakes of Air India from Government of India through its subsidiary Talace Private Ltd, as part of Disinvestment of Public Sector Units in India.
- 10 Oct – Almost eight states in India expects power outage due to reduced stocks of Coal as fuel to power the thermal power stations.
- 16 Oct –
  - Indian men's football team wins eighth SAFF Championship by beating Nepal with 3–0 margin.
  - Flash floods and landslides caused by heavy rains in High Range area of Kerala causes 42 deaths and loss of property worth over ₹200 crores.
- 19 Oct – Heavy rains and landslides along Kumaon division of Uttarakhand claims at least 64 lives.
- 21 Oct - India breaches 1 billion COVID-19 vaccine doses administered mark.
- 26 Oct –
  - Central Bureau of Investigation arrests two retired Indian Navy officers in information leak case.
  - Tripura riots – A Mosque vandalised in North Tripura district of Tripura following a Vishva Hindu Parishad rally organized in protest of attacks against Hindus in Bangladesh during Durga Puja.
- 27 Oct – The Supreme Court of India orders to constitute an independent panel to make a comprehensive probe into Pegasus (spyware) snooping scandal.
- 29 Oct – Indian Railway Catering and Tourism Corporation share prices made an unprecedented fluctuation. The share prices plunged 29% in the morning after Ministry of Railways asked IRCTC to share half of its convenience fee collections. However, the stock registered recovery of all losses in the same day after Department of Investment and Public Asset Management announced roll back of this decision.
- 30 Oct –
  - Bollywood actor Shah Rukh Khan's son Aryan Khan released from Mumbai Central Prison after 22 days custody following bail order from Bombay High Court. The court cited in its order that there is no proof for alleged conspiracy charges that were filed against Aryan Khan.
  - Malayalam cinema actor Bineesh Kodiyeri, who is also son of Kerala based Communist Party of India (Marxist) leader Kodiyeri Balakrishnan who was jailed at Central Prison, Bangalore in October 2020 in connection with Prevention of Money Laundering Act violations and 2020 Bengaluru drug case released following bail order from Karnataka High Court.

=== November ===
- 5 Nov – PM Modi unveiled Adi Shankaracharya's statue in a temple of Shiva, Kedarnath, Uttarakhand. Which was previously destroyed in 2013 flash floods.
- 13 Nov – Colonel Viplav Tripathi and his convoy of the Assam Rifles were ambushed by People's Liberation Army(PLA) militants in Churachandpur district of Manipur.
- 18 Nov – Share prices of Fintech company Paytm, which done India's biggest Initial public offering worth Rs. 18,300 crores fell by 27.4% on its day of listing thereby marking one of the biggest listing day loss in the history of Indian Stock market.
- 19 Nov –
  - In a televised address to the nation, Prime Minister of India Narendra Modi apologized to the farmers and announces repealing of three Farm Bills following a year long farmers' protest in borders of Delhi.
  - Heavy rains and flash floods hit Rayalaseema claiming at least 29 lives.
- 24 Nov – The prices of Tomato breaches Rs.100 mark in many Indian states.

=== December ===
- 2 to 6 Dec – Cyclone Jawad devastated the regions of Andhra Pradesh, West Bengal and Odisha.
- 4 Dec – a special unit of the Indian Army mistakenly opens fire against civilians in Mon district of Nagaland and resultant clashes between civilian protestors and forces leaves 15 civilians and one soldier killed.
- 7 Dec - A Catholic missionary school in the Central Indian state of Madhya Pradesh is attacked and vandalized by a mob of some 500 Hindu extremists, despite school authorities requesting police protection prior to the attack. School principal Brother Anthony Pynumkal told The Indian Express that the mob was armed with iron rods and stones, and chanted Jai Shri Ram while damaging school property.
- 8 Dec – The Chief of Defence Staff Bipin Rawat and 12 others are killed in a chopper crash near Coonoor, Nilgiris district, Tamil Nadu.
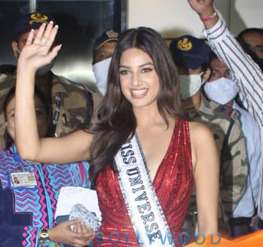
  India wins Miss Universe after 21 years.
- 9 Dec – The 2020–2021 Indian farmers' protest called off as govt agrees to the demands of the farmers.
- 13 Dec – Indian model Harnaaz Sandhu wins Miss Universe.
- 19 Dec – In a Dharma Sansad event conducted at Haridwar, Hindutva leaders like Yati Narsinghanand and Syed Waseem Rizvi calls for genocide of Muslims, makes hate speeches and offers Rs.1 Crore award for becoming Hindu terrorist.
- 20 Dec – The Karnataka state cabinet approves an anti-conversion 'love jihad' bill, making it a law in December 2021.
- 27 Dec – Aam Aadmi Party won most seats in its debut at 2021 Chandigarh Municipal Corporation election.

== Deaths ==
=== January ===
- 2
  - Buta Singh, 86, Indian politician, Minister of Home Affairs (1986–1989), Governor of Bihar (2004–2006) and Chairman of NCSC (2007–2010), cerebral haemorrhage.
  - Neelamperoor Madhusoodanan Nair, 84, Indian poet.
  - K. Balu, Indian film producer (Chinna Thambi, Uthama Raasa, Jallikattu Kaalai), complications from COVID-19.
- 3
  - Shani Mahadevappa, 90, Indian actor (Shankar Guru, Kaviratna Kalidasa, Guru Brahma), coronary artery disease.
  - Anil Panachooran, 55, Indian lyricist (Arabikkatha, Drona 2010, Marykkundoru Kunjaadu) and poet, COVID-19.
  - Shaji Pandavath, 63, Indian screenwriter and film director, complications from heart surgery and a fall.
- 5
  - A. Madhavan, 86, Indian writer.
  - Vennelakanti, 63, Indian lyricist (Murali Krishnudu, Gharana Bullodu, Pellaina Kothalo), cardiac arrest.
- 22
  - Narendra Chanchal, 80, Indian bhajan and hymn singer, age related illness

=== February ===
- 9 Rajiv Kapoor, 58, Bollywood actor
- 22 Mohanbhai Sanjibhai Delkar, 58, Indian politician MP
- 24 Sardool Sikander, 60, Punjabi singer

=== March ===
- 22 Theepetti Ganesan, Tamil actor

=== April ===
- 4
  - Shashikala, 88, Indian actress
  - Chandra Nayudu, 88, cricket commentator, illness
- 17 Vivek, 59, actor and comedian in Tamil cinema, acute coronary syndrome
- 18 Anupama Puchimanda, 41, hockey umpire, COVID-19
- 26 Dadudan Gadhvi, 82, Poet, Singer and Lyricist of Gujrati Cinema
- 27 Ashok A. Amrohi, 68, Diplomat
- 30 Rohit Sardana, 41, Indian journalist and media personality
- 30 K. V. Anand, 54, director and Cinematographer in Tamil cinema, complications from COVID-19

=== May ===
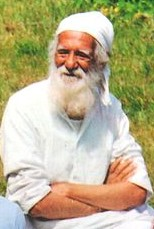
Sunderlal Bahuguna

- 3 Noor Alam Khalil Amini, 68, Academic and litterateur.
- 6 Ajit Singh, 82, Indian politician
- 11 K. R. Gouri Amma, 101, Indian politician
- 14 Kanaka Murthy, Indian sculptor, COVID-19
- 20 Nizamuddin Asir Adrawi, 94, Historian and biographer.
- 21 Sunderlal Bahuguna, 94, Indian environmental activist

=== June ===
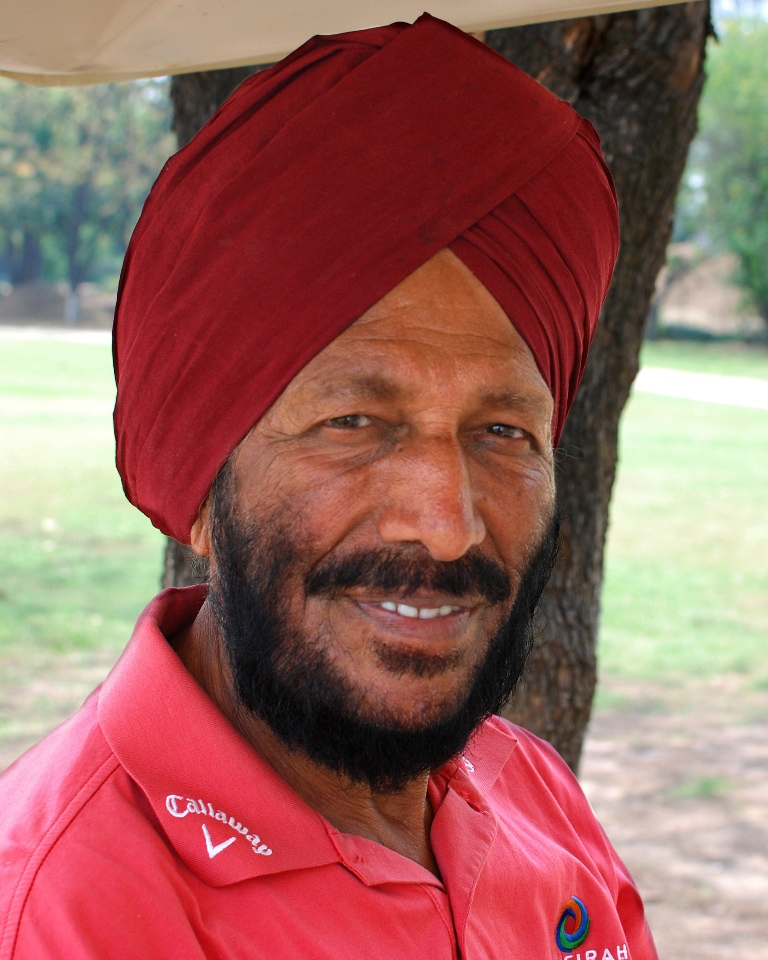
Milkha Singh

- 16 Swatilekha Sengupta, 71, Bengali actress
- 18 Milkha Singh, 91, Indian athlete, pneumonia caused by COVID-19
- 22 Poovachal Khader, 72, Malayalam lyricist.
- 25 Chandrama Santha, 83, politician, MLA.

=== July ===
- 5 Stan Swamy, 84, Catholic priest and tribal rights activist
- 7 Dilip Kumar, 98, Veteran Bollywood Actor
- 8 Abul Kalam Qasmi, 70, Former Dean, Faculty of Arts at the Aligarh Muslim University.
- 8 Virbhadra Singh, 87, Former Chief Minister of Himachal Pradesh.
- 10 P. K. Warrier, 100, Ayurveda practitioner and head of Arya Vaidya Sala, Kottakal
- 13 Yashpal Sharma (cricketer), 66, Member of 1983 winning Indian Cricket Team
- 16 Surekha Sikri, 75, Veteran Television Actress
- 16 Danish Siddiqui, 41, Pulitzer Prize winner Photojournalist

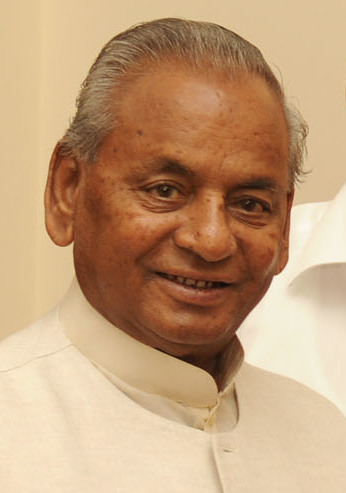
Kalyan Singh

=== August ===
- 21 Kalyan Singh, 89, Former 2-time CM of Uttar Pradesh

=== September ===
1 Syed Ali Shah Geelani, 91, Kashmiri separatist leader

- 2 September
  - Siddharth Shukla, 40, TV Actor
  - Chandan Mitra, 65, journalist
- 3
  - Raghunath Chandorkar, 100, cricketer
  - Suraiya Hasan Bose, 93, textile conservator and designer
- 5 Sheila Bhalla, 88, economist

=== October ===
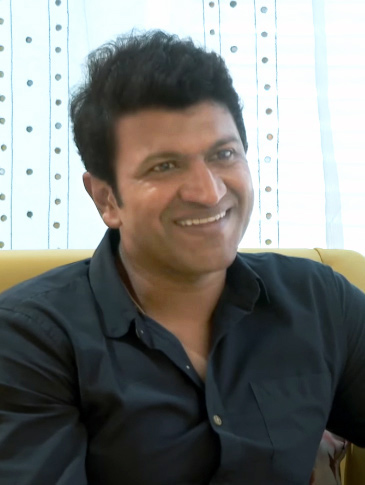
Puneeth Rajkumar

- 3 Ghanshyam Nayak, 77, TMKOC Actor
- 4 Shakti Sinha, 64, Retired Civil servant
- 11 Nedumudi Venu, 73, Malayalam Actor
- 22 K. A. Abraham, 79, Cardiologist and writer
- 23
  - V. Govindan, 80, Politician
  - Minoo Mumtaz, 79, Actress
- 29 Puneeth Rajkumar, 46, Kannada actor

=== November ===
- 4 Subrata Mukherjee, 75, Indian politician
- 15 Mannu Bhandari, Indian writer
- 30 Sirivennela Seetharama Sastry, 66, Indian poet and lyricist

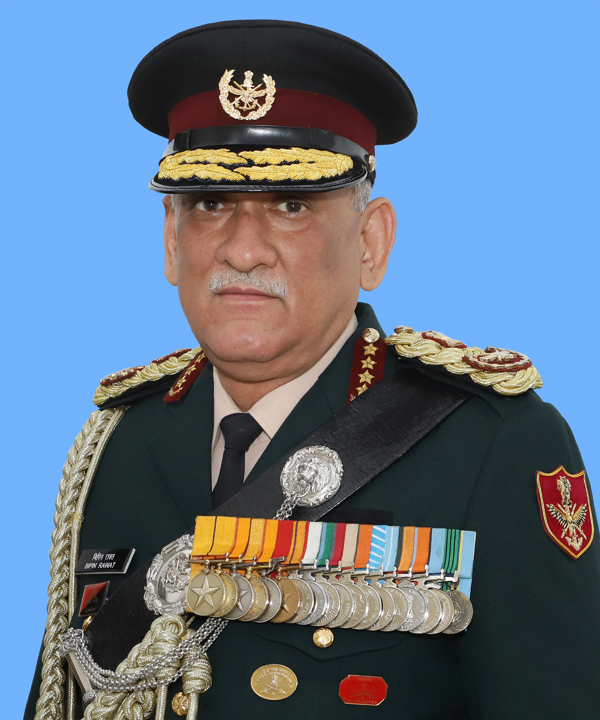
Bipin Rawat

=== December ===
- 4 Vinod Dua, 67, Indian reporter
- 5 M. Sarada Menon, 98, Indian psychiatrist
- 8 Bipin Rawat, 63, Chief of Defence Services
- 13 Harbans Kapoor, 75, Indian politician
- 26 Manikka Vinayagam, 78, Indian playback singer and actor

== See also ==
=== Country overviews ===
- India
- History of India
- History of modern India
- Outline of India
- Government of India
- Politics of India
- Timeline of Indian history
- Years in India

=== Related timelines for current period ===
- 2021
- 2021 in politics and government
- 2020s
- 21st century
