= Fugitive Economic Offender =

Indian legal term

A Fugitive Economic Offender is a legal term in India. It relates to any individual against whom a warrant for arrest in relation to a "scheduled offence" has been issued by any Indian court under the Fugitive Economic Offenders Act. It applies to individuals who either left India to avoid criminal prosecution; or, being abroad, refuse to return to India to face criminal prosecution. The list of Fugitive Economic Offenders currently residing abroad is Pushpesh Baid, Ashish Jobanputra, Vijay Mallya, Sunny Kalra, Sanjay Kalra, Sudhir Kumar Kalra, Aarti Kalra, Varsha Kalra, Jatin Mehta, Umesh Parekh, Kamlesh Parekh, Nilesh Parekh, Eklavya Garg, Vinay Mittal, Nirav Modi, Neeshal Modi, Mehul Choksi, Sabya Seth, Rajiv Goyal, Alka Goyal, Lalit Modi, Ritesh Jain and Priti Ashish Jobanputra.

== History ==
=== 2018 ===
On 14 March 2018, Minister of State for External Affairs M. J. Akbar stated the names of the 31 absconding businesspeople in the Lok Sabha, including diamond traders Nirav Modi, Mehul Choksi, Jatin Mehta and embattled liquor baron Vijay Mallya, who is facing an investigation from the Central Bureau of Investigation.

Minister of State for External Affairs Gen. (Retd.) V. K. Singh submitted the Fugitive Economic Offender names to the Lok Sabha on 25 July 2018. Singh said: "efforts are being made for securing the presence of these accused in the country by way of issuance of Look out Circular, (Red corner notice) and extradition requests." The CBI and the Enforcement Directorate are pursuing legal actions to bring back 28 Indians (including six women), who have been charged for financial irregularities and criminal offenses, and are believed to have been living abroad since 2015.

=== 2019 ===
On 4 January 2019, Minister of State for Finance Shiv Pratap Shukla said in the Lok Sabha the names of the 27 defaulting businessmen and economic offenders who had fled the country in the last five years. Interpol has been approached and asked to issue red corner notices to 20 of the 27 offenders.

=== 2020 ===
On February 5, 2020, the Minister of State for Finance S.P. Shukla informed the Lok Sabha that a total of 72 Indians charged with frauds or financial irregularities are currently abroad and efforts are being made to bring them back to the country. Only 2 of the fugitives have been brought back to India and they are Vinay Mittal and Sunny Kalra.

== List of Fugitive Economic Offender ==
| Name of the person | Amount Swindled in Rs.Crores | Accused Company Name | Lives in | Extradition Status |
|---|---|---|---|---|
| Vijay Mallaya | 7,505 | M/s.Kingfisher Airlines Ltd | United Kingdom | Not extradited – extradition is in progress |
| Mehul Choksi | 7,080 | Gitanjali group (M/s.Gitanjali Gems Ltd, M/s.Gili Jewellery, M/s.D'damas, M/s.Nakshatra World Ltd) | Antigua | Not extradited – India does not have an extradition treaty with Antigua, but India is trying to bring back Choksi under the provisions of the 1993 Extradition Act of Antigua and Barbuda, which provides for extradition of a fugitive to a designated Commonwealth country. |
| Jatin Metha | 6,580 | M/s.Winsome Diamonds and Jewellery Ltd, M/s.Precious Jewellery and Diamond and M/s.Su-Raj Diamonds | St Kitts and Nevis | Not extradited – India does not have an extradition treaty with St Kitts and Nevis |
| Nirav Modi | 6,498 | M/s.Firestar Diamond Ltd and M/s.Nirav Modi Ltd | United Kingdom | Not extradited – extradition is in progress |
| Umesh Parekh, Kamlesh Parekh and Nilesh Parekh | 2,672 | M/s.Shree Ganesh Jewellery House Ltd | Dubai; Kenya | Not extradited |
| Lalit Modi | 1,700 | M/s.Modi Enterprises Ltd and M/s.IPL | United Kingdom | Not extradited – extradition is in progress |
| Ritesh Jain | 1,421 | M/s.Rajeshwar Exports Ltd and M/s.Auro Gold Jewellery Private Ltd | | Not extradited |
| Rajiv Goyal and Alka Goyal | 778 | M/s.Surya Pharmaceuticals Ltd | | Not extradited |
| Ashish Jobanputra | 770 | M/s.ABC Cotspin Private Ltd | | Not extradited |
| Sabhya Seth | 390 | M/s.Dwarka Das Seth International Private Ltd | Dubai | Not extradited |
| Sanjay Bhandari | 150 | M/s.Offset India Solutions Private Ltd and M/s.Avaana Software and Services Private Ltd | | Not extradited |
| Vinay Mittal | 43.19 | M/s.Krishna and Krishna Enterprises and M/s.Mittal Metals | Indonesia | Extradited |
| Sunny Kalra | 10 | M/s.White Tiger Steels Private Ltd | Oman | Extradited |

== See also ==
- Mehul Choksi
- Nirav Modi
- Punjab National Bank Scam
