= Bad Boy Billionaires: India =

Indian Netflix original television programming

- Directed by: Dylan Mohan Gray; Nick Read; Johanna Hamilton
- Country of origin: India
- Original languages: English; Hindi
- No. of seasons: 1
- No. of episodes: 4

Original release
- Network: Netflix
- Release: 5 October 2020

Bad Boy Billionaires: India is a 2020 Indian Netflix original documentary anthology television series which focuses on the lives of four prominent business magnates of India, Vijay Mallya, Nirav Modi, Subrata Roy and Ramalinga Raju, who achieved prominent success in their businesses during their lifetime before being accused of corruption.

The documentary chronicles major financial scams in India and was released in part, following a lawsuit initiated by Subrata Roy's Sahara Group. Netflix unveiled the official trailer of the film on 24 August 2020 and it was reported that the trailer was removed subsequently from the platform following legal issues. The documentary was initially scheduled to be streamed via Netflix on 2 September 2020.

Three (of four) episodes of Bad Boy Billionaires: India released globally on Netflix in October 2020 to enthusiastic reviews and strong viewership. It went on to enjoy a multiple-week run as the number one most-watched Netflix title in India while also nearing the top of Netflix's global charts and being named the most-watched documentary of the year 2020 in India. It won the Filmfare Award, India's top film honour, in 2021. The fourth episode (about Ramalinga Raju) was finally released on 31 December 2025.

== Plot ==
The documentary series explores scandals involving controversial Indian billionaires Vijay Mallya (Kingfisher Airlines), Subrata Roy (Sahara India), Nirav Modi (Gitanjali Group) and Ramalinga Raju (Satyam Computers).

== Episodes ==
No.	Title	Directed by	Original release date
1	"The King of Good Times"	Dylan Mohan Gray	5 October 2020
Beer baron and airline owner Vijay Mallya builds a brand image of excess till his Kingfisher empire plunges into alleged money laundering and debt.
2	"Diamonds Aren't Forever"	Johanna Hamilton	5 October 2020
Dazzling the world’s elite to globalize his jewelry brand, Nirav Modi is suspected of illegally inflating diamond prices.
3	"The World's Biggest Family"	Nick Read	5 October 2020
Subrata Roy takes his Sahara India Pariwar conglomerate to dizzying heights before facing accusations of enticing poor investors into a pyramid scheme.
4	"Riding the Tiger"	Nick Read	31 December 2025
The story of B. Ramalinga Raju, founder of Satyam Computer Services, and the massive accounting fraud he committed.

== Legal issues ==
On 28 August 2020, two petitions were filed against the release of the documentary in the Bihar district court. The Bihar court passed an interim stay order on the petition filed by Subrata Roy against the release of the documentary in the Netflix platform. Following the stay order by the Bihar court, Netflix threatened to move to the Supreme Court against the court order for restraining the documentary release.

Diamond merchant Mehul Choksi also filed a petition against the release of the documentary in the Delhi High Court and further filed a request demanding for the pre-screening of the documentary. Mehul Choksi filed the plea after being told that his involvement related to the Punjab National Bank Scam was also covered in the documentary. However his plea was dismissed by a single judge panel of the Delhi High Court on 29 August 2020.

On 1 September 2020, Hyderabad civil court restrained the release of the webseries after issuing a stay order on a petition filed by Ramalinga Raju. Raju claimed that the webseries documents half-truths about him and insisted that it would tarnish his reputation and privacy in an unlawful way.

On 2 September 2020, the Supreme Court rejected the plea for relief filed by Netflix and upheld the stay order on the release of the documentary.

On 5 October 2020, Netflix released three out of four films in the anthology, including those featuring Vijay Mallya, Nirav Modi and Subrata Roy, while the final episode about Ramalinga Raju remained encumbered by legal injunctions.

On 31 December 2025, Netflix finally released the final, long-delayed episode of the docuseries Bad Boy Billionaires: India, focusing on the infamous Satyam scandal by B. Ramalinga Raju, after a five-year legal battle. Chief Judge of City Civil Court in Hyderabad vacated an ad-interim injunction that had restrained Netflix from streaming this episode.

== Reception ==
=== Critical reception ===
Bad Boy Billionaires: India received positive reviews from critics, with a 71% fresh rating on Rotten Tomatoes. It currently has a 7.9/10 rating on IMDB. The Film Companion praised it for "Speaking truth to power, journalistic scrutiny, and a dissection of (in)famous legacies", while stopping short of qualifying it as investigative journalism. The Time of India rated it 4/5, praising the impartial narrative and dramatic editing while noting that it excelled in exploiting the vicarious interest that infamous personalities generate. The Scroll and The Hindu both had mixed reviews, criticizing the narrative for barely scratching the surface and reiterating information already in the public domain.

=== Awards and nominations ===
Winner – Best Nonfiction Original, Series/Special – 2021 Filmfare OTT Awards, December 2021
