= Usha Ananthasubramanian =

Indian banker

- Born: 1 October 1960 (age 65)
- Education: University of Madras, University of Mumbai
- Occupations: Managing director and chief executive officer of Allahabad Bank

Usha Ananthasubramanian is a former managing director and chief executive officer of the now defunct Allahabad Bank.

== Education and early career ==
Ananthasubramanian holds a master's degree in statistics from the University of Madras and a master's degree in Ancient Indian culture from University of Mumbai

Her background in statistics helped her get her first job as a specialist in the actuarial department with Life Insurance Corporation (LIC), while her understanding of Ancient Indian Culture gave her a deeper insight into understanding risk. She was charged by the CBI for the Nirav Modi fraud case during her tenure at PNB

== Career in banking ==
Ananthasubramanian started her career in banking in February 1982, when she joined the Bank of Baroda as a specialist officer in its planning stream.

Prior to joining Bhartiya Mahila Bank, Ananthasubramanian worked at Punjab National Bank. She served as MD of Punjab National Bank between August 2015 and May 2017. Prior to that, she served as CEO of Allahabad Bank.

Ananthasubramanian was ranked the 19th Most Powerful Woman in business by Fortune India First women CHAIRMAN of IBA

== Punjab National Bank Scam ==
Ananthasubramanian was named in CBI chargesheet in association with Punjab National Bank Scam, relating to fraudulent Letters of Undertaking issued to Nirav Modi. CBI alleges that key PNB bank officials, led by then CEO Ananthasubramanian, failed to initiate steps that could have prevented the $2-billion fraud at the lender after the banking watchdog RBI had red-flagged likely gaps in systems controls. It adds that the RBI had instructed that while acknowledging the Caution Advice, they should report the occurrence of such incidents at their banks. If no such incident was observed, a NIL statement should be furnished. RBI revealed that PNB, had not responded to the said caution advice until February 2018, when the fraud came to light. Ananthasubramanian was the MD of PNB when the caution advice was issued.

On 20 August 2018, Usha Ananthasubramanian was granted bail on a surety bond of Rs 1 lakhs by Special CBI court in Mumbai. A week earlier, the government had dismissed Usha on the last day of her work. She was dismissed with immediate effect.

== See also ==
- Punjab National Bank Scam
- Nirav Modi
