= Narayan Sitaram Phadke =

Indian writer (1894–1978)

Narayan Sitaram Phadke (1894–1978) was a writer from Maharashtra, India. wrote in his native Marathi as well as English.

== Early life and family ==
Narayan Phadke was born to Sitaram Phadke and his wife in the town of Karjat, Ahmadnagar district in 1894. He had a Master of Arts degree from Bombay University. In later years as a writer, Phadke was commonly known by his first and middle initials in Marathi, 'Na Si'. Phadke married twice. With his first wife, he had four children. Later he married one of his students, Kamala, who became a distinguished writer in her own right . The couple had three children. After separation from his first wife, he continued to support her and their children. A daughter from the first marriage later wrote about the silent but terrible suffering of her mother who being relatively uneducated could not articulate herself and having been brought up in conservative value system chose to suffer in silence.

== Career ==
He worked from 1919 to 1920 as an assistant editor of the Maratha newspaper.

He was a professor of Philosophy and Psychology at Rajaram College in Kolhapur from 1926 to 1951. For many years in that period, he also edited Ratnakar, Zhankar, and Anjali magazines. After his retirement, he settled in the city of Pune in Maharashtra, continuing to write.

=== Literary career ===
Allaha Ho Akbar was Phadke's first novel. He wrote about 150 books, including 74 novels, 27 collections of short stories, 22 reviews, 7 plays, and the autobiographical Maje Jeevan: Ek Kadambari. His work included fiction as well non-fiction. Although most of his work was in Marathi, he also wrote in English. For many years he also publicly feuded with another well known Marathi author, Acharya Pralhad Keshav Atre. Phadke presided over the Marathi Sahitya Sammelan held in Ratnagiri in 1940. The Indian government honoured him with the Padmabhushan, India's third-highest civilian award, in 1962 for his literary accomplishments.

== Advocate of birth control and eugenics ==
In the 1920s, Phadke strongly advocated birth control, and eugenics to control population in India. He had Margaret Sanger, an American birth control advocate, write the foreword for his book published in 1927 on the subject called "Sex problem in India". He contributed to the journal Birth Control Review.

== A partial list of books ==
- Kalankshobha
- Allaha Ho Akbar (1917) - Marathi translation of the novel, temporal power by Marie Corelli
- Daulat
- Jadugar
- Uddhar
- Akherache Band
- Pravasi
- Shonan
- Asman
- Toofan
- Majha Dhram
- Indradhanushya
- Sarita Sagar
- hak
- Niranjan
- Atakepaar
- Ved Vaare
- Zanzavat
- Jeddamal
- Uujadle pn surya kothe aahe?
- Maze Jeevan: Ek Kadambari (autobiography)
- Sex Problem in India: Being a Plea for a Eugenic Movement in India and a Study of All Theoretical and Practical Questions Pertaining to Eugenics
- Where Angels Sell Eggs, and Other Stories in English
