= Karjat (disambiguation) =

Karjat is a city in Raigad district in the Indian state of Maharashtra.

Karjat may also refer to:

- Karjat, Ahmednagar, a town in Ahmednagar district, Maharashtra
  - Karjat taluka, a taluka (sub-district) in Ahmednagar district
- Karjat taluka, Raigad, a taluka in the Raigad district
