= Foreign Exchange Management Act, 1999 =

Act of the Parliament of India, replaces Act 46 of 1973

Parliament of India
- Long title: An Act to consolidate and amend the law relating to foreign exchange with the objective of facilitating the external trade and payments and for promoting the orderly development and maintenance of foreign exchange market in India.
- Citation: Act No. 42 of 1999
- Enacted by: Parliament of India
- Enacted: 29 December 1999
- Assented to by: President K. R. Narayanan
- Assented to: 29 December 1999
- Commenced: 1 June 2000

Repeals
- Foreign Exchange Regulation Act, 1973
- Status: In force

The Foreign Exchange Management Act, 1999 (FEMA) is an Act of the Parliament of India which was adopted under the guidance of Prime Minister Atal Bihari Vajpayee "to consolidate and amend the law relating to foreign exchange with the objective of facilitating external trade and payments and for promoting the orderly development and maintenance of foreign exchange market in India". It was passed on 29 December 1999 in parliament, replacing the Foreign Exchange Regulation Act (FERA). This act makes offences related to foreign exchange civil offenses. It extends to the whole of India, replacing FERA, which had become incompatible with the pro-liberalization policies of the Government of India. It enabled a new foreign exchange management regime consistent with the emerging framework of the World Trade Organization (WTO). It also paved the way for the introduction of the Prevention of Money Laundering Act, 2002, which came into effect on 1 July 2005. Starting in 2004, the Act also includes provisions for the Liberalised Remittance Scheme (LRS), this provision allows for easier outward remittance of funds and is available to all resident individuals, including minors and students.

== Description ==
Unlike other laws where everything is permitted unless specifically prohibited, under the Foreign Exchange Regulation Act (FERA) of 1973 (predecessor to FEMA) everything was prohibited unless specifically permitted. Hence the tenor and tone of the Act was very drastic. It required imprisonment even for minor offences. Under FERA, a person was presumed guilty unless he proved himself innocent, whereas under other laws a person is presumed innocent until he is proven guilty.

FEMA is a regulatory mechanism that enables the Reserve Bank of India to pass regulations and the Central Government to pass rules relating to foreign exchange in tune with the Foreign Trade policy of India.

== History ==
=== Foreign Exchange Regulation Act, 1973 ===
Foreign Exchange Regulation Act, 1973

Parliament of India
- Long title: An Act to consolidate and amend the law regulating certain payments, dealings in foreign exchange and securities, transactions indirectly affecting foreign exchange and the import and export of currency and bullion, for the conservation of the foreign exchange resources of the country and the proper utilisation thereof in the interests of the economic development of the country.
- Citation: No. 46 of 1973
- Territorial extent: India
- Enacted: 19 September 1973
- Commenced: 1 January 1974
- Repealed: 1 June 2000

Repeals
- Foreign Exchange Regulation Act, 1947

Repealed by
- Foreign Exchange Management Act, 1999
- Status: Repealed

The Foreign Exchange Regulation Act, 1973 (FERA) was legislation passed in India in 1973 that imposed strict regulations on certain kinds of payments, the dealings in foreign exchange (forex) and securities and the transactions which had an indirect impact on the foreign exchange and the import and export of currency. The bill was formulated with the aim of regulating payments and foreign exchange.

FERA came into force with effect from January 1, 1974.

FERA was introduced at a time when foreign exchange (Forex) reserves of the country were low, Forex being a scarce commodity. FERA therefore proceeded on the presumption that all foreign exchange earned by Indian residents rightfully belonged to the Government of India and had to be collected and surrendered to the Reserve Bank of India (RBI). FERA primarily prohibited all transactions not permitted by RBI.

Coca-Cola was India's leading soft drink until 1977 when it left India after a new government ordered the company to dilute its stake in its Indian unit as required by the Foreign Exchange Regulation Act (FERA). In 1993, the company (along with PepsiCo) returned after the introduction of India's Liberalization policy.

=== Switch from FERA ===
FERA did not succeed in restricting activities such as the expansion of Multinational Corporations. The concessions made to FERA in 1991–1993 showed that FERA was on the verge of becoming redundant. After the amendment of FERA in 1993, it was decided that the act would become the FEMA. This was done in order to relax the controls on foreign exchange in India. This led on to invention of beliefs among stakeholders that FEMA and FERA co-exist in present Indian scenario.

FERA was repealed in 1998 by the government of Atal Bihari Vajpayee and replaced by the Foreign Exchange Management Act, which liberalised foreign exchange controls and restrictions on foreign investment.

The buying and selling of foreign currency and other debt instruments by businesses, individuals and governments happens in the foreign exchange market. Apart from being very competitive, this market is also the largest and most liquid market in the world as well as in India. It constantly undergoes changes and innovations, which can either be beneficial to a country or expose them to greater risks. The management of foreign exchange market becomes necessary in order to mitigate and avoid the risks. Central banks would work towards an orderly functioning of the transactions which can also develop their foreign exchange market. Foreign Exchange Market Whether under FERA or FEMA's control, the need for the management of foreign exchange is important. It is necessary to keep adequate amount of foreign exchange.

FEMA served to make transactions for external trade and easier – transactions involving current account for external trade no longer required RBI's permission. The deals in Foreign Exchange were to be 'managed' instead of 'regulated'. The switch to FEMA shows the change on the part of the government in terms of for the capital.

== Fundamental principle ==
Under FEMA, the general principle is that all current account transactions are permitted unless expressly prohibited and all Capital account transactions are prohibited unless expressly permitted. (see Sections 5 and 6 of FEMA)

"Capital account transaction" means a transaction which alters the assets or liabilities, including contingent liabilities, outside India of persons resident in India or assets or liabilities in India of persons resident outside India, and includes transactions referred to in sub-section (3) of section 6;

It generally refers to Capital inflows like Equities, Grants and Debt. Inflows within the country are called as 'Foreign Direct Investment' (FDI). Capital debt is termed – External Commercial Borrowings (ECB).

Equity outflows are termed as 'Foreign outbound investment'.

Any corporate entity receiving FDI or making an outbound investment has to file an annual FEMA return called as Foreign Liabilities and Assets (FLA).

Current Account transaction are defined as transactions other than capital account transactions. Mainly include transactions pertaining to individual remittances, trade, student remittances etc.

== Regulations/Rules under FEMA ==
(All under the guidance of Prime Ministers Atal Bihari Vajpayee and Narendra Modi)

- Foreign Exchange Management (Current Account Transactions) Rule, 2000
- Foreign Exchange Management (Permissible Capital Account Transactions) Regulations, 2000
- Foreign Exchange Management (Foreign currency accounts by a person resident in India) Regulations, 2000
- Foreign Exchange (Adjudication Procedure and Appeals) Rules, 2000
- Foreign Exchange Management (Encashment of Draft, Cheque, Instrument and payment of interest) Rules, 2000
- Foreign Exchange (Authentication of Documents) Rules, 2000
- Foreign Exchange Management (Export of Goods and Services) Regulations, 2015
- Foreign Exchange Management (Export and Import of Currency) Regulations, 2015
- Foreign Exchange Management (Acquisition and transfer of immovable property outside India) Regulations, 2015
- Foreign Exchange Management (Foreign Currency Accounts by a person resident in India) Regulations, 2015
- Foreign Exchange Management (Insurance) Regulations, 2015
- Foreign Exchange Management (International Financial Services Centre) Regulations, 2015
- Foreign Exchange Management (Possession and Retention of Foreign Currency) Regulations, 2015
- Foreign Exchange Management (Realisation, Repatriation and Surrender of Foreign Exchange) Regulations, 2015
- Foreign Exchange Management (Regularization of assets held abroad by a person resident in India) Regulations, 2015
- Foreign Exchange Management (Manner of Receipt and Payment) Regulations, 2016
- Foreign Exchange Management (Remittance of Assets) Regulations, 2016
- Foreign Exchange Management (Deposit) Regulations, 2016
- Foreign Exchange Management (Establishment in India of a branch office or a liaison office or a project office or any other place of business) Regulations, 2016
- Foreign Exchange Management (Borrowing and Lending) Regulations, 2018
- Foreign Exchange Management (Cross Border Merger) Regulations, 2018
- Foreign Exchange Management (Non-debt Instruments) Rules, 2019
- Foreign Exchange Management (Debt Instrument) Regulations, 2019
- Foreign Exchange Management (Mode of Payment and Reporting of Non-Debt Instruments) Regulations, 2019
- Foreign Exchange Management (Margin for Derivative Contracts) Regulations, 2020
- Foreign Exchange Management (Overseas Investment) Rules, 2022
- Foreign Exchange (Compounding Proceedings) Rules, 2024

== Related legislation ==
=== Foreign Contribution (regulation) Act, 2010 ===
FCRA, 2010 has been enacted by the Parliament to consolidate the law to regulate the acceptance and utilization of foreign contribution or foreign hospitality by certain individuals or associations or companies and to prohibit acceptance and utilization of foreign contribution or foreign hospitality for any activities detrimental to national interest and for matters connected therewith or incidental thereto.

==== Applicability ====
As per Section 1(2) of FCRA, 2010, the provisions of the act applies to:

- Whole of India
- Citizens of India outside India; and
- Associate Branches or subsidiaries, outside India, of companies or bodies corporate, registered or incorporated in India

=== Acts/rules/guidelines which regulate the flow of foreign contribution to India ===
The flow of foreign contribution to India is regulated under

- Foreign Contribution (Regulation) Act, 2010,
- Foreign Contribution (Regulation) Rules, 2011
- And other notification / orders etc., issued there under from time to time.
- FCRA, 1976 repealed after coming of FCRA, 2010

==== Amendments ====
- The Foreign Contribution (Regulation) Amendment Act 2020 present in

== What is foreign contribution? ==
As per Section 2(1)(h) of FCRA, 2010, "foreign contribution" means the donation, delivery or transfer made by any foreign source, ─

(i)Of any article, not being an article given to a person* as a gift for his/her personal use, if the market value, in India, of such article, on the date of such gift is not more than such sum as may be specified from time to time by the Central Government by rules made by it in this behalf. (This sum has been specified as ₹25,000/- currently);

(ii)Of any currency, whether Indian or foreign;

(iii)Of any security as defined in clause (h) of section 2 of the securities Contracts(Regulation) Act, 1956 and includes any foreign security as defined in clause (o) of Section 2 of the Foreign Exchange Management Act, 1999.

Explanation 1 – A donation, delivery or transfer or any article, currency or foreign security referred to in this clause by any person who has received it form any foreign source, either directly or through one or more persons, shall also be deemed to be foreign contribution with the meaning of this clause.

Explanation 2 ‒ The interest accrued on the foreign contribution deposited in any bank referred to in sub-section (1) of Section 17 or any other income derived from the foreign contribution or interest thereon shall also be deemed to be foreign contribution within the meaning of this clause.

Explanation 3 ‒ Any amount received, by a person from any foreign source outside India, by way of fee (including fees charged by an educational institution in India from foreign student) or towards cost in lieu of goods or services rendered by such person in the ordinary course of his business, trade or commerce whether within India or outside India or any contribution received from an agent or a foreign source towards such fee or cost shall be excluded from the definition of foreign contribution within the meaning of this clause.

* In terms of FCRA, 2010 "person" includes ‒

- (i) An individual;
- (ii) A Hindu undivided family;
- (iii) An association;
- (iv) ) A company registered under section 25 of the Companies Act, 1956 (now Section 8 of Companies Act, 2013).

== See also ==
- Law of India
