= Gitanjali Group =

Jewelry retailer based in Mumbai, India

Gitanjali
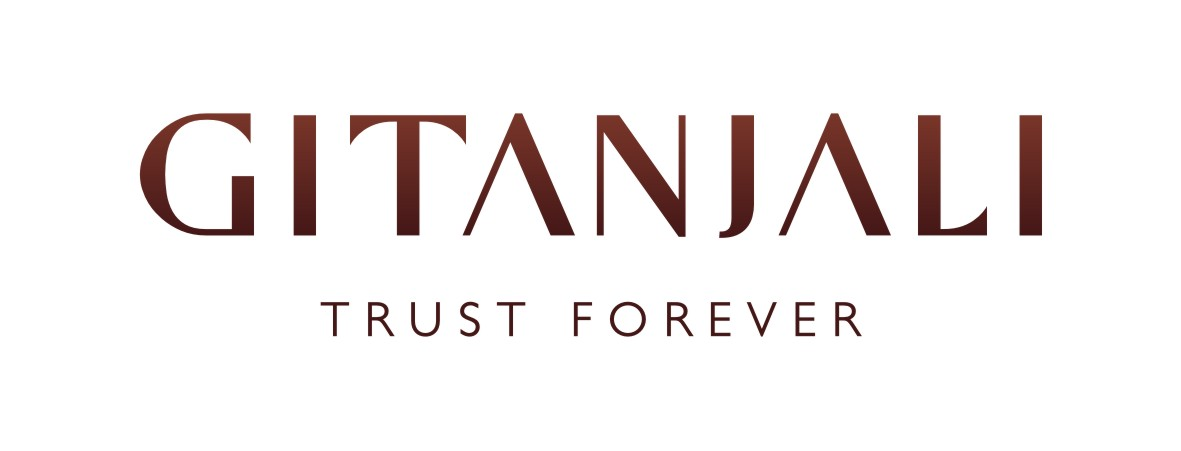
- Type: Public
- Industry: Diamond and Jewellery
- Founded: 1966; 60 years ago
- Fate: Bankruptcy
- Headquarters: Mumbai, India
- Key people: Mehul Choksi (Chairman)
- Products: Diamond, jewellery, retail & lifestyle and infrastructure
- Revenue: ₹135 billion (US$1.4 billion)
- Website: www.gitanjaligroup.com now permanently dead link

Gitanjali Group was one of the largest branded jewellery retailers in the world. It was headquartered in Mumbai, India. Gitanjali used to sell its jewellery through over 4,000 Points of Sale and held a market share of over 50 per cent of the overall organised jewellery market in India. Prominent brands housed by the group included Nakshatra, D'damas, Gili, Asmi, Sangini, Maya, Giantti, World of Solitaire and Shuddhi. It was closed following Punjab National Bank Fraud more commonly known as Nirav Modi Fraud.

== 2018 investigation ==
Mehul Choksi, the founder and managing director of ‘Gitanjali Gems’ and the maternal uncle of Nirav Modi has come under the radar of various investigating agencies, following the Enforcement Directorate (ED) filing a case against the latter for conducting fraudulent transactions from the Punjab National Bank. This case is claimed to be India's biggest bank fraud wiping out 14,000 crore rupees. Mehul Choksi fled India along with his nephew after the F.I.R was filed about the bank scam.

== See also ==
- Nirav Modi
- Punjab National Bank Scam
