= Punjab National Bank Scam =

2018 banking fraud scandal in India

The Punjab National Bank scam refers to the fraudulent letter of undertaking (LoU) scam worth ₹14,357 crore (approximately US$2 billion in 2018). The LoUs were issued by Punjab National Bank (PNB) at its branch in Fort, Mumbai, making the bank liable for the amount.

The fraud was allegedly orchestrated by Nirav Modi, his associates, and related business entities. Modi, his wife Ami, his brother Nishal, and his uncle Mehul Choksi were named in a Central Bureau of Investigation (CBI) charge sheet, along with the partners of the firms Diamond R US, Solar Exports, and Stellar Diamonds. Several PNB officials and employees were also accused. Modi and several family members left India in January 2018, shortly before the fraud was publicly disclosed.

The Enforcement Directorate (ED) confiscated movable and immovable assets worth ₹692.90 crore belonging to Nirav Modi and his associates under the Fugitive Economic Offenders Act, 2018 according to media reports in September 2024. Modi was declared a fugitive economic offender in December 2019.

Interpol issued a Red Notice against Nirav Modi in 2018 for charges including criminal conspiracy, criminal breach of trust, cheating, corruption, and money laundering.

In March 2019, Nirav Modi was arrested in central London by British authorities.

The bank initially stated that two employees at the branch were involved in the scam. The bank's core banking system was bypassed when employees issued LoUs to overseas branches of other Indian banks, including Allahabad Bank, Axis Bank, and Union Bank of India, using the international financial messaging system SWIFT. The irregular transactions were later detected by a newly appointed bank official.

The bank subsequently lodged a complaint with the CBI to investigate the scam along with the ED and the Reserve Bank of India (RBI). The CBI named key officials, including Usha Ananthasubramanian, former CEO of PNB, and executive directors KV Brahmaji Rao and Sanjiv Sharan, in the charge sheet. The agency alleged that they failed to implement several RBI circulars and cautionary notices regarding the reconciliation of the SWIFT messaging system with the core banking system.

== Investigation ==
PNB alleged that associates of three firms—Diamond R US, M/s Solar Exports, and M/s Stellar Diamonds—approached the bank on 16 January 2018 with a request for Letters of Understanding (LoU) to pay their overseas suppliers. The bank demanded at least a 100% cash margin for issuing LoUs, but the firms contended that they had previously received LoUs without such a guarantee. Branch records did not show that any such facility had been granted to the firms. The bank suspected fraudulent activities and began investigating the transaction history.

On 29 January 2018, PNB filed a complaint with the CBI alleging that Nirav Modi, Ami Modi, Nishal Modi and Mehul Choksi—partners of M/s Diamond R US, M/s Solar Exports, and M/s Stellar Diamonds—colluded with two bank officials. They were accused of defrauding the bank and causing wrongful loss. The complaint alleged that two individuals, including Gokulnath Shetty, a retired Deputy Manager at the bank, and another bank official, had issued fraudulent LoUs to Hong Kong-based creditors. These LoUs were issued on behalf of three firms associated with Nirav Modi and the Gitanjali Group.

The first information report filed by the CBI stated: “The public servants committed abuse of official position to cause pecuniary advantage to Diamonds R US, Solar Exports and Stellar Diamonds and wrongful loss of ₹280.70 crore to PNB during 2017.”

On 18 May 2018, the scam was reported to have ballooned to ₹14,356.84 crore (US$2.1 billion), and Nirav Modi was reportedly hiding in London, allegedly travelling on a fake passport. On 13 June 2018, the CBI approached Interpol to issue a red notice against Nirav Modi's brother, Nishal, and one of his executives in connection with its probe into the Punjab National Bank (PNB) fraud. The CBI also sent a request to Interpol to issue an RCN against Nirav Modi and his uncle, Mehul Choksi of the Gitanjali Group.

On 20 August 2018, former MD and CEO of Allahabad Bank, Usha Ananthasubramanian, was granted bail by the Special CBI court in Mumbai. On 14 August 2018, the government dismissed Ananthasubramanian. She was the MD & CEO of Punjab National Bank between August 2015 and May 2017 and had also served as its executive director. She was dismissed with immediate effect. The CBI registered a disproportionate assets case against a retired deputy manager of Punjab National Bank, Gokulnath Shetty, a key accused, for allegedly amassing wealth 200% above his known sources of income.

Nirav Modi, who disappeared in February 2018, had been in London since June 2018. He was arrested in central London on 19 March 2019 after a bank clerk recognised him and alerted the police. UK police arrested Modi on behalf of the Indian authorities, who had requested his extradition. Modi appeared in court on 20 March 2019. That same month, the UK court refused to grant him bail twice on the grounds that he was a flight risk. On a third attempt, Modi was again denied bail and was ordered to remain in custody until 24 May 2019. The court also noted that Modi could tamper with evidence if released. It was revealed in earlier hearings that Modi had threatened to kill a key witness and bribe another to escape justice.

In June 2019, four Swiss bank accounts belonging to Nirav Modi and his sister, Purvi Mehta, with a combined worth of ₹283.16 crore, were frozen by Swiss authorities on ED's request. Following action by Swiss authorities, on 2 July 2019, the Singapore High Court ordered the freezing of four bank accounts in the names of Modi, Purvi, and her husband, Mayank Mehta. These accounts reportedly had ₹44 crore. Interpol also issued a red notice against both Purvi and Mayank.

In August 2019, the Central Bureau of Investigation moved an application in the special CBI court, seeking to have Nirav Modi, Neeshal Modi, and close associate Subhash Parab declared proclaimed offenders and attach their properties. All three had been declared 'wanted' by the CBI in its charge sheet in the scam. Although warrants were issued for their arrest, the CBI was unable to execute the warrants as the accused had fled India before the charges were filed.

Modi's custody was extended until 19 September and later further remanded to judicial custody until 17 October by a UK court. The court stated that preparations were underway for his five-day extradition hearing scheduled for 11–15 May 2020, and that he must appear via video link before the court every 28 days.

In September 2019, Antigua and Barbuda Prime Minister Gaston Browne described Mehul Choksi of the Gitanjali Group as a "crook" and said he should be repatriated to India after he exhausts all legal options. Mehul Choksi, who was then in Antigua and Barbuda, told the high court that he left India for medical treatment, not to avoid prosecution in the case. He stated he would return to India as soon as he was medically fit to travel.

In December 2019, CBI stated in the additional charge sheet submitted before the CBI court in Mumbai that Nirav Modi, Nehal Modi and two of their business associates had tried to threaten witnesses and destroy evidence. According to CBI's charge-sheet, the evidence emerged after nine of Nirav's employees submitted details to CBI of how Nirav and Nehal, along with associates, took them to Egypt against their will and coerced them into signing documents that would establish the nine as owners of shell companies floated by Nirav.

In March 2020, the Enforcement Directorate auctioned 72 luxury items seized from Nirav Modi for ₹2.29 crore. In May 2020, at the request of Indian agencies, Interpol reissued a Red Notice against Nehal Modi for allegedly assisting his stepbrother in defrauding PNB. In 2019, his name had been removed from the Interpol website after Nehal and Neeshal Modi challenged the Red Notice. The Central Bureau of Investigation (CBI) charged Nehal Modi with allegedly managing two companies for Nirav Modi, which received $50 million from shell entities. After the scam was exposed, he allegedly took diamonds worth $6 million, 3.5 million UAE dirhams, and 50 kg of gold. In Dubai, he was accused of destroying digital evidence, including mobile phones and a server, and threatening key witnesses.

On 8 June 2020, the Prevention of Money Laundering Act (PMLA) court ordered the confiscation of nearly ₹1,400 crore worth of Nirav Modi’s property. In May 2020, a UK court adjourned the trial until September 2020 during a four-day hearing. Modi applied for political asylum after his bail was denied five times in the UK. In July 2020, the ED filed a charge sheet against Mehul Choksi, alleging that he ran an organised racket to cheat customers and lenders in India, Dubai, and the United States.

== Reforms ==
Following the scam, the Government of India enacted the Fugitive Economic Offenders Act, 2018 to deter economic offenders from evading Indian laws by giving powers to the government to confiscate assets of fugitive offenders, including benami assets of absconding loan defaulters. The Act covers a wide range of economic offences, loan default, fraud, tax evasion, money laundering, corruption and benami transactions.

In March 2018, the Reserve Bank of India scrapped banking instruments such as the Letter of Understanding (LoU) and Letter of Comfort (LoC) in an attempt to plug loopholes and improve banks' due diligence in trade credit. Some bankers noted that LoUs and LoCs led receiving banks to rely entirely on the issuing bank's assessment of creditworthiness.

== In the media ==
The fraud features in the second episode, "Diamonds Aren't Forever", of the Netflix documentary series Bad Boy Billionaires: India. Mehul Choksi approached the Delhi High Court and filed a plea demanding a pre-screening before the release. However, the plea was dismissed by a single judge bench of the Delhi High Court on 29 August 2020. The series was released on 5 October 2020.

== See also ==
- Nirav Modi
- List of scandals in India
