= Nirav Modi =

Indian diamond dealer and Man accused in the PNB bank scam

- Born: 27 February 1971 (age 55); Palanpur, Gujarat, India
- Education: Wharton School (University of Pennsylvania)
- Years active: 1989–2018
- Organization(s): Firestar Diamond International, Gitanjali Group, A. Jaffe Inc.
- Known for: Diamond business bank fraud, wanted by Interpol
- Spouse: Ami Modi
- Children: 3
- Relatives: Mehul Choksi (uncle)
- Status: Arrested (in London, 20 March 2019)
- Criminal charges: Criminal conspiracy, criminal breach of trust, cheating and dishonesty including delivery of property, corruption, money laundering, fraud, embezzlement and misrepresentation
- Wanted by: Interpol, The Judicial Authorities of India, Central Bureau of Investigation, Enforcement Directorate, Mumbai Police
- Wanted since: August 2018

Details
- Victims: Union Bank of India, Punjab National Bank, Paul Alfonso, Amukurajuddin Bohra
- Locations: Dubai; Hong Kong; London; Singapore
- Imprisoned at: HM Prison Thameside, UK

Nirav Deepak Modi (born 27 February 1971) is an Indian-born Belgian businessman and fugitive who was charged by Interpol and the Government of India for criminal conspiracy, criminal breach of trust, cheating and dishonesty including delivery of property, corruption, money laundering, fraud, embezzlement and breach of contract in August 2018. Modi is being investigated as a part of the $2 billion fraud case of Punjab National Bank (PNB). In March 2018, Modi applied for bankruptcy protection in Manhattan, New York. In June 2018, Modi was reported to be in the UK applying for political asylum. In June 2019, Swiss authorities froze a total of US$6 million in Modi's Swiss bank accounts along with the assets.

In December 2022, he lost his final appeal against extradition request by Indian agencies. All his requests for bail have been rejected, and he is currently lodged in a jail. He is yet to be extradited to India as his request for political asylum is pending with the UK Government.

== Biography ==
=== Early life ===
Nirav Modi was born in Palanpur, Gujarat, and grew up in Antwerp, Belgium. His family has been in the diamond business for several generations. When he was 19, he and his father Deepak Modi moved to Mumbai to work with his maternal uncle, Mehul Choksi. Choksi is the head of Gitanjali Group, a retail jewellery company with 4,000 stores in India.

Modi attended the Wharton School at the University of Pennsylvania but eventually dropped out. While studying, he met his future wife, Ami, the daughter of a diamond businessman Amukuraj Choksey.

=== Career ===
After returning to India in 1989 and training in all aspects of the diamond trading business, Modi founded Firestar in 1999 (formerly known as Firestone), a diamond sourcing and trading company. Firestar is the exclusive distributor of Rio Tinto’s Argyle pink diamonds in India.

In 2002, his company started manufacturing jewellery on a contract basis. He acquired Frederick Goldman in 2005, and Sandberg & Sikorski and A.Jaffe in 2007 in the USA.

In 2008, a close friend asked Modi to make a pair of earrings, after which he created the brand. In 2010, he launched a diamond store bearing his name in New Delhi's Defence Colony, followed by one in Mumbai's Kala Ghoda. 17 other store openings followed across the world. Modi launched globally with boutiques in New York City and Hong Kong in 2015, followed by two other boutiques in Hong Kong in 2016 and one in MGM Macau in 2016.

He became well known after he designed his "Golconda Lotus Necklace" with an old, 12-carat, pear-shaped diamond as a centerpiece in 2010. The diamond had been previously sold in the 1960s; Modi repolished it. The necklace featured a lattice of white and pink diamonds. It was included on the cover of Christie’s catalogue in Hong Kong and was auctioned for US$3.6 million in 2010.

In 2012, another Modi necklace, the Riviere of Perfection, was sold at Sotheby’s Hong Kong auction. This necklace featured 36 flawless white diamonds and weighed a total of 88.88 carats.

== Dealings with Union Bank of India ==
The Union Bank of India sued Modi in a Hong Kong court. Union Bank claimed in a writ filed at the High Court on 26 September 2018 that Modi guaranteed two loans made to Firestone Trading Private and Firestar Diamond in 2011. The bank demanded that he pay more than $5.49 million plus interest after both firms allegedly defaulted on repayments.

== 2018 Investigation and Lawsuits (PNB fraud case) ==
=== Complaint from Punjab National Bank ===
In February 2018, the Indian government's Central Bureau of Investigation (CBI) launched an investigation of Modi, acting on a complaint from the Punjab National Bank. The complaint alleged that Modi and his partners defrauded the bank of ₹28000 Crore (approximately US$4 billion) by conspiring with bank officials to fraudulently obtain Letters of Undertaking for making payments to overseas suppliers. While ₹28000 Crore is the fraud that has been alleged to date, the potential loss to Punjab National Bank is reported to be up to ₹11000 Crore. The Enforcement Directorate (ED) is also investigating the fraud case that the CBI registered against him.

Modi responded to the bank on 15/16 February 2018, stating that "In the anxiety to recover your dues immediately, despite my offer (on 13 February, a day before the public announcement, and on 15) your actions have destroyed my brand and the business and have now restricted your ability to recover all the dues leaving a trail of unpaid debts". Modi estimated his domestic business at around Rs 6,500 Crore, and said "this could have helped reduce/discharge the debt to the banking system," but claimed that this was currently impossible as all his bank accounts had been frozen and assets had been seized.

=== Arrest and Extradition Case ===
In April 2018, Indian authorities alleged that Modi had found safe haven in Hong Kong and formally requested his arrest. However, a few months later, he applied for asylum in the UK, claiming he was a victim of "political persecution" and denying any wrongdoing. In March 2019, The Telegraph reported that he was living in an £8 million apartment in London, and Indian authorities requested his extradition from the UK. On 20 March 2019, he was arrested in London after a warrant was issued against him. Modi applied for bail in the UK High Court on 3 May, a day after his remand was extended. All his requests for bail have been rejected as of May 2024.

On 25 February 2021, a UK court allowed the Indian government's request to have Modi extradited to India as a key defendant in the PNB fraud case. The UK Home Secretary signed the extradition order on 15 April. Modi then had 14 days to appeal the decision to the UK High Court, which he did on 1 May, claiming he would not get a fair trial in India. During the appeal, Modi remained imprisoned at Wandsworth Prison in south-west London. On 23 June 2021, a UK high court rejected Modi's application to appeal his extradition to India.

In December 2022, the Royal Courts of Justice in London refused permission for Nirav Modi to appeal his extradition to the UK Supreme Court and ordered him to pay legal fees of £150,247.

=== Impact of the Case on Modi's finances and business ===
Initially, a few of Modi's stores remained open for business, including his store at Marina Bay Sands in Singapore; however these have gradually all closed. On 7 March 2018, Modi's firm Firestar Diamond Inc. applied for bankruptcy protection at a Manhattan bankruptcy court, in order to protect its assets in the United States and their revolving credit facility with Israel Discount Bank. His company, A.JAFFE, acquired through his Synergies Corporation, was auctioned in May 2018 and was purchased by Parag Diamond. With the collapse of his brand, Modi's fortune has collapsed. Forbes removed him from their annual billionaires list, and on 9 March 2018, estimated his current wealth to be less than $100 million.

Modi's properties in India, including jewellery, paintings, and real estate, worth about Rs 523 crore (about $75 million) have been seized by the Enforcement Directorate (ED). Previously, Modi had bought a Rs 900 crore sea-facing property in Mumbai's coveted Samudra Mahal properties with his wife Ami Modi.

The ED has also seized four wind power plants, owned by Modi, in Rajasthan with a total capacity of 9.6 megawatt (MW). The plants earn up to Rs 5 crore a year due to a share purchase agreement with Rajasthan's state electricity board. These wind power plants have been operational since 2014. In March 2018, the ED seized a 5.24 MW solar power plant spread over 135 acres in Karjat in Ahmednagar district worth Rs 60 crore. In May 2018, the CBI and the ED had registered two FIRs each to probe the case.

In March 2019, 68 works from Modi's art collection, were sold on behalf of India's income tax department. The artwork was sold for £5.3m including a Vasudeo S. Gaitonde painting that sold for £2.6m. The iconic music store Rhythm House, at Kala Ghoda, Mumbai, whose auction was planned after its value was determined, was bought by Modi in 2017.

On 8 June 2020, the Prevention of Money Laundering Act (PMLA) Court ordered the confiscation of nearly Rs 1,400 crores worth of his property.

The October 2021 Pandora Papers showed that his sister, Purvi Modi, set up an offshore firm just one month before Nirav fled India.

As a result of the fraud case, the Reserve Bank of India has stopped issuing Letters of Undertaking (LoU) and Letters of Comfort (LoC) for imports, which has limited the financial flexibility of importers.

In December 2024, the Finance Minister of India - Nirmala Sitaram claimed that the Enforcement Directorate recovered ₹1,052 crore from Nirav Modi's assets and returned the money to banks.

It is believed that he was overextended for several years and used new LoUs to pay for the past ones for about seven years. One of his employees has stated that, "He wanted to grow his business, and to do in five years what might otherwise have taken 20 years." He claimed that "If he'd gone public, maybe he could have pledged his equity, raised some money, and finally paid the bank back. Perhaps he would have done that."

=== 2025 Developments in Extradition Proceedings ===
In October 2025, the Government of India assured the United Kingdom that Nirav Modi would not be questioned in connection with the US$2 billion Punjab National Bank (PNB) fraud case if extradited. The assurance, submitted through the UK's Crown Prosecution Service, was aimed at expediting his extradition process. According to the agreement, Modi would be lodged in Arthur Road Jail, Mumbai, upon arrival in India.

== Achievements and recognition ==
- 2010: 1st Indian jeweller to be featured on the covers of Christie's and Sotheby’s Catalogues.
- 2013: Featured on the Forbes list of Indian billionaires.
- Patents: Jasmine cut diamond, United States Design Patent USD763118S1, JEWELRY DESIGN, United States Design Patent US D738,777 S.

== Personal life ==
Nirav Modi is married to Ami Modi. They met when both were students at the Wharton School of the University of Pennsylvania, although Nirav Modi left Wharton after a year to return to the diamond business.

Ami Modi is a US citizen by birth. She ran the "Nirav Modi Scholarship for Excellence", which supported 250 students every year. Ami and Nirav Modi have three children - two daughters and one son. They have attempted to raise their children conservatively and only use Gujarati in their home.

== In popular culture ==
- Bad Boy Billionaires: India - 2020 Netflix original documentary anthology webseries
