= Bharatiya Mahila Bank =

Former subsidiary of State Bank of India

- Type: Subsidiary
- Industry: Banking, Financial services
- Founded: 19 November 2013; 12 years ago
- Defunct: 1 April 2017
- Fate: Merged with State Bank of India
- Headquarters: Delhi, India
- Key people: S. M. Swathi (Executive Director)
- Products: Core banking; Credit card; Consumer banking; Corporate banking; Finance and insurance; Investment banking; Mortgage loans; Private banking; Private equity; Wealth management
- Number of employees: 500
- Parent: State Bank of India

Bharatiya Mahila Bank (BMB; lit. 'Indian Women's Bank') was a fully owned subsidiary of State Bank of India based in Mumbai, India. Former Indian Prime Minister Manmohan Singh inaugurated the system on 19 November 2013 on the occasion of the 96th birth anniversary of former Indian Prime Minister Indira Gandhi. As part of the Modi government's banking reforms and to ensure greater banking outreach to women, the bank merged with State Bank of India on 1 April 2017.

While being run by women, and lending exclusively to women, the bank allowed deposits to flow from everyone. India was the third country, after Pakistan and Tanzania, to have a bank exclusively to benefit women.

== Banking for women ==
In India, before the PMJDY scheme, only 26% of women had an account with a formal financial institution, compared with 46% of men. This has changed after the initiation of Pradhan Manthri Jan Dhan Yojana – accounts of women jumped radically to 61%. That means an account in either a bank, or a credit union, or a co-operative, or post office or a microfinance institution, according to a study by the World Bank. Also, for women, per capita credit was 80 per cent lower than males.

Furthermore, the results of a study using a global dataset covering 350 Microfinance Institutions (MFIs) in 70 countries indicates that more women clients is associated with lower portfolio-at-risk, lower write-offs, and lower credit-loss provisions, ceteris paribus. provision

== Objective ==
The bank placed an emphasis on funding for skills developments to help in economic activity. Moreover, the products were designed in a manner to give a slight concession on loan rates to women.

The bank also aimed to inspire people with entrepreneurial skills and, in conjunction with NGOs, planned to locally mobilise women to train them in vocations like toy-making or driving tractors or mobile repairs, according to Usha Ananthasubramanian (CMD).

One of the other objectives of the bank was to promote asset ownership amongst women customers. Studies have shown that asset ownership amongst women reduces their risk of suffering from domestic violence.

== Capital ==
The Bank's initial capital consisted of Rs 1,000 crores. The government planned to have 25 branches of the said bank by the end of March 2014 and 500 branches by 4th year of operation (2017). As on date of merger it had 103 Branches.

US-based FIS Global, in partnership with Wipro was providing IT systems at the country's first women-focussed bank.

== Branches ==
The bank had 103 branches and was planning to open more than 700 branches within next two years. Bharatiya Mahila Bank's branches were located in Mumbai-Nariman Point, Central Mumbai-Ghatkopar, Thane, Pune, Patna, Noida, Chandigarh, Bhubaneshwar, Panchkula, Kochi, Vadodara, Ahmedabad, Indore, Bhopal, New Delhi-Nehru Palace, New Delhi-Model Town, Chandigarh, Gurgaon, Patna, Ranchi, Raipur, Guwahati, Shimla, Shillong, Gangtok, Thiruvananthapuram, Chennai, Coimbatore, Madurai, Bengaluru, Mangalore, Hyderabad, Visakhapatnam, Jaipur, Alwar, Dholpur, Komargiri, Kakinada, Goa-Panji, Agartala, Agra, Haridwar, Kanpur, Lucknow, Dehradun, Doddapalya, Kutiyatu, Murshidabad and Mysuru.

The merger of this bank with SBI would mean 103 branches and business of Rs. 1,600 crores added to SBI.

== Key management ==
Bharatiya Mahila Bank was wholly owned by Government of India. Initially the bank had a board of directors consisting of eight women. Mrs. Usha Ananthasubramanian was the chairman and managing director and SM Swathi was executive director. The board consisted of a business graduate sarpanch from Rajasthan, Chhavi Rajawat, Dalit entrepreneur Kalpana Saroj, who turned around a tubes business, retired public banker Nupur Mitra, academic Pakiza Samad, private equity professional Renuka Ramnath, Godrej Group executive Director Tanya Dubash and a government nominee. Details can be seen on the bank's website www.bmb.co.in.

One of the key objective of the Bank was focus on the banking needs of women and promote economic empowerment through women's growth and developments. The largest branch by way of volume of business, Mumbai Branch situated in the iconic Air India Building was headed by A.J. Gogoi, Chief Manager, deputed from United Bank of India

== Criticism ==
The bank has been criticised as adopting a segregationist approach to gender equality. Uma Shashikant of The Hindu writes:

Women-only banks are another instance of wanting to treat women ‘differently’. We guise this in many forms, some in garbs of reverence, some as protection, but they are all forms of discrimination that promote gender-based stereotyping. Women-only organisations stem from this eagerness to patronise women in the name of preferential treatment.
