= Fugitive Economic Offenders Act, 2018 =

Parliament of India
- Long title: An Act to provide for measures to deter fugitive economic offenders from evading the process of law in India by staying outside the jurisdiction of Indian courts, to preserve the sanctity of the rule of law in India and for matters connected therewith or incidental thereto.
- Citation: Act No. 17 of 2018
- Territorial extent: India
- Passed by: Lok Sabha
- Passed: 19 July 2018
- Passed by: Rajya Sabha
- Passed: 25 July 2018
- Assented to: 31 July 2018

Legislative history

Initiating chamber: Lok Sabha
- Bill title: The Fugitive Economic Offenders Bill, 2018
- Bill citation: Bill No. 79 of 2018
- Introduced by: Arun Jaitley
- Introduced: 12 March 2018
- Status: In force

The Fugitive Economic Offenders Act, 2018 is an Indian law that empowers any special court (set up under the Prevention of Money Laundering Act, 2002) to confiscate all properties and assets of economic offenders who are charged in offences involving sums exceeding INR 100 crores and are evading prosecution by remaining outside the jurisdiction of Indian courts. The bill for the act was introduced in the Lok Sabha on 12 March 2018 and passed on 25 July 2018. The Act also provides for provisional attachment of all properties of the offender and confiscation of the same on declaration as fugitive economic offender by the Special Court.

The bill has been subject to mixed reception among legal commentators.

== See also ==
- List of acts of the Parliament of India
- Fugitive Economic Offender
