= 2021 Pune fire =

Industrial fire in Pune, India

Coordinates: 18.511904°N 73.678780°E

- Date: 7 June 2021
- Location: Pune, Maharashtra, India
- Type: building fire
- Deaths: 18
- Injuries: unknown

On 7 June 2021, a fire in Pune, Maharashtra, India, killed at least 18 people.

== Event ==
At around 15:45 IST on 7 June 2021, a fire broke out at a chemical plant of SVS Aqua Technologies due to a blast in one of the machines. The plant is on the outskirts of Pune in MIDC area of Urawade-Pirangut. The plant manufactured chemicals, surfactants and sanitisers. At least six fire tenders were deplyed by the MIDC to control the fire. At the time of the fire, which occurred approximately 10 miles from the city centre, 37 workers were trapped inside the building. Fifteen of the 18 victims were women, and most were residents of Mulshi taluka. The bodies were found in huddled together in multiple groups. Rescue efforts took time as the walls of the plant were needed to be broken to access the trapped people.

== Aftermath ==
Prime Minister Narendra Modi declared an ex gratia of ₹2 lakh (US$2,100) to the families of the victims with causalities and ₹50,000 (US$520) to injured victims. Maharashtra government also announced ₹5 lakh (US$5,200) to the deceased. The company also provided with pension of 90% of the drawn salary.

Due to delay of around 40 minutes for the fire tender to reach the site, locals requested the authorities to provide a new location for fire brigade. Case on culpable homicide not amounting to murder and negligent conduct were filed under Indian Penal Code on the three owners; Nikunj Shah, Keyur Vipin Shah and Bipin Jayantilal Shah.
