= Shakti Sinha =

Indian civil servant (1957–2021)

Director Nehru Memorial Museum & Library
- In office 5 October 2015 – 4 October 2019

Personal details
- Born: 11 May 1957
- Died: 4 October 2021 (aged 64) New Delhi, India
- Occupation: Civil servant (IAS)

Shakti Sinha (11 May 1957 – 4 October 2021) was a career civil servant of the Indian Administrative Service and director of the Nehru Memorial Museum & Library.

At the time of his death, he was director general of the International Buddhist Confederation and Honorary Director, Atal Bihari Vajpayee Institute of Policy Research and International Studies (AIPRIS), M.S.University of Baroda, Gujarat.

== Early life and education ==
Shakti Sinha had his early schooling in St. Xavier's School, Ranchi. He subsequently moved to Delhi where he completed his B.A. (Honours) in History in 1976 and his M.A. in history from the Hindu College, Delhi in 1978, specializing in contemporary Chinese history & politics, and modern Indian history. He also obtained an M.A. in International Commerce & Policy from the George Mason University in 2002.

== Career ==
=== Administration ===
Shakti Sinha was of the 1979 batch of the Indian Administrative Service (IAS). Over the course of his administrative career, he served in various capacities in the states and Union Territories of Delhi, Goa and the Andaman and Nicobar Islands.

Amongst other postings, he served as the Principal Secretary (Finance & Power), Government of Delhi, and Chief Secretary, Andaman and Nicobar Islands. He also headed the governance and development section of the United Nations Assistance Mission in Afghanistan (UNAMA) .

He took voluntary retirement from the IAS in 2013 on account of policy differences and after the Government of Delhi passed him over for appointment as Chief Secretary .

=== Foreign Assignments ===
Shakti Sinha served as the senior advisor to the executive director representing India, Bangladesh, Bhutan and Sri Lanka on the board of the World Bank from January 2000 to June 2004. He served in various senior capacities in the UN programmes in Afghanistan, including UNAMA and UNDP, from April 2006 to April 2009.

=== Academic ===
He was a visiting senior fellow, Observer Research Foundation, New Delhi from April 2005 to March 2006 and a research fellow at the Institute of South Asian Studies, National University of Singapore in 2009.

== Notability ==
He was closely associated with Prime Minister Atal Bihari Vajpayee, whom he got to know in the 1980s. He first served as his secretary when Vajpayee became prime minister in 1996 and continued serving as private secretary after he became leader of the Opposition from June 1996 to January 1998. He again served as Joint Secretary to the prime minister from March 1998 to November 1999 during his second premiership. A book recounting his experiences, Vajpayee The Years That Changed India, was published to general acclaim in December 2020.

== Books and publications ==
- Shakti Sinha, https://penguin.co.in/book/vajpayee/ Vajpayee: The Years That Changed India, 2020, Penguin, ISBN 9780670093441, 300 pages
