= Mehul Choksi =

Fugitive businessman

- Born: Mehul Chinubhai Choksi; 5 May 1959 (age 67); Bombay, India
- Citizenship: Antigua and Barbuda (2017–)
- Education: G. D. Modi College
- Occupation: Businessman
- Known for: Alleged bank fraud, wanted by Indian Judicial Authorities, Owner of Gitanjali Group
- Criminal charges: Criminal conspiracy; Criminal breach of trust; Cheating and dishonesty including delivery of property; Corruption; Money laundering
- Criminal status: Found and arrested in Dominica in May 2021; Arrested by Belgian authorities in April 2025
- Children: 3
- Relatives: Nirav Modi (nephew)

Mehul Chinubhai Choksi (born 5 May 1959) is an Indian-born fugitive and businessman with citizenship in Antigua and Barbuda, who is wanted by the Indian judicial authorities for alleged criminal conspiracy, criminal breach of trust, cheating and dishonesty including delivery of property, corruption and money laundering.

Mehul Choksi along with his nephew Nirav Modi, his wife Ami Modi, and brother Neeshal Modi are named in an alleged Rs 12,636 crore fraud at Punjab National Bank. In order to escape India after the scam, he secured citizenship in Antigua and Barbuda, a Caribbean Island through their Citizenship by Investment Program in 2017.

He was the owner of Gitanjali Group, a retail jewellery company with 4,000 stores in India.

An arrest warrant for Choksi has been issued in connection with the alleged Punjab National Bank fraud case. He was formerly the subject of an Interpol red notice, but this was withdrawn in 2023. He was allegedly involved in stock market manipulation in 2013. In late May 2021, he went missing from Antigua and Barbuda. Choksi claims that he was kidnapped from Antigua by agents of the Indian state, while several reports and investigation revealed that he fled the country to escape legal proceedings in India. After being found and arrested in Dominica on charges of illegal entry he was then returned to Antigua and Barbuda on interim bail for medical treatment. Investigations into his disappearance are ongoing.

According to NDTV, Mehul Choksi tried hard to spread his kidnapping narrative and evade extradition to India. In this attempt, he also allegedly brought a string of officials in Antigua to extend the court proceedings in his disappearance case in the country.

Again according to NDTV, evidence has also been uncovered that Choski worked with others to influence Interpol and interfere into its proceedings to delay his extradition to India. Belgian authorities confirmed on April 14, 2025 that they have Mehul Choksi in custody after he was arrested near his current residence in Antwerp.

== Early life ==
Mehul Choksi was born on 5 May 1959 in Bombay, the son of Chinubhai Choksi. He was educated at G. D. Modi College in Palanpur, Gujarat. He has three children, a son and two daughters. Choksi is the maternal uncle of fugitive businessman Nirav Modi.

His younger brother Chetan Chinubhai Choksi owned and operated a diamond company named Diminco NV, based in Antwerp, which had defaulted on a US$25.8 million payment to a subsidiary of ICICI Bank. In 2013, the bank litigated a lawsuit against Diminco NV, in commercial courts in Belgium and UK.

== Career ==
Choksi started his career in the gem and jewellery sector in 1975, and took over the leadership of Gitanjali Gems from his father in 1985, when it was focused on just rough and polished diamonds. He owns Gitanjali Group, which includes Gitanjali Gems.

== Punjab National Bank (PNB) fraud case ==
In March 2018, a special PMLA court issued non-bailable arrest warrants (NBWs) against Choksi, and his nephews Nirav Modi and Neeshal Deepak Modi, owner of Firestar Diamonds. They are suspected of colluding with two employees of Punjab National Bank (PNB), the country's second-largest state-owned lender, in an alleged $1.8 billion fraud. At least six PNB staff and at least six employees of Choksi and Modi have been arrested so far. Choksi is a fugitive of Indian government. Choksi has protested his innocence in an open letter. On 6 March 2018, the CBI detained Vipul Chitalia, the Vice-President of Gitanjali Group of Companies and a key aide of Choksi. Chitalia was arrested at Mumbai airport and remained in custody till March 2018. A designated PMLA authority held that 41 properties worth about Rs 1,210 crore, attached by the Enforcement Directorate (ED) in the name of Mehul Choksi and his associated firms, are money laundering assets and ordered that their attachment should continue. The central probe agency provisionally attached 15 flats and 17 office premises in Mumbai, a mall in Kolkata, a four-acre farm house in Alibaug and 231 acres of land at locations like Nashik, Nagpur, Panvel in Maharashtra and Villupuram in Tamil Nadu, in February 2018 under the Prevention of Money Laundering Act (PMLA) in connection with the about US$2 billion alleged fraud at a Mumbai-based branch of the Punjab National Bank (PNB).

On 7 January 2018, Choksi left India to the Caribbean nation of Antigua and Barbuda. A few days later, the PNB scam was disclosed. On 15 January, he took the oath of citizenship of Antigua and Barbuda, where he applied for the citizenship in November 2017 under the country's Citizenship by Investment program. However, Indian authorities argue that he has not renounced his Indian citizenship. On 17 June, his lawyer informed the Bombay High Court that he left India for medical check-up and not to avoid prosecution in the case. Ever since, CBI has been trying to extradite him back to India. In December 2018, Interpol published a Red Notice against Choksi at India's request.

In May 2021, Choksi was detained in Dominica, with his lawyers alleging that he had been kidnapped from Antigua and forcibly taken there by individuals acting on behalf of Indian agents. He subsequently lodged a lawsuit in London’s High Court, accusing the Indian government of organizing the abduction and coercing a false confession, claims that India has denied. In 2023 the Red notice issued in 2018 was withdrawn.

In April 2025, Choksi was arrested in Antwerp by Belgian police after India requested his extradition. His lawyers argued that he should not be kept in custody because of serious health problems, including cancer. Soon after, India’s Central Bureau of Investigation (CBI) sent a team to Belgium to help prosecutors by providing documents and working with a European law firm. Choksi asked for bail twice, but both requests were denied—the first by the Court of Cassation in the summer and the second on August 22 by the court of appeal, which refused his offer of house arrest, saying he was a flight risk with a record of avoiding justice. His extradition hearing is set for mid-September 2025, a key moment in the case.

== See also ==
- List of fugitives from justice who disappeared
- Punjab National Bank Scam
