= Sheila Bhalla =

Canadian-Indian economist (1933–2021)

- Born: Sheila Scott; 1933; Canada
- Died: 25 September 2021 (aged 87–88); Puducherry, India
- Occupations: Economist; Union activist

Sheila Bhalla (1933-25 September 2021) was a Canadian-Indian labor economist and trade union activist.

She was professor emerita at the School of Social Sciences in Jawaharlal Nehru University, New Delhi, and also taught at Panjab University, Chandigarh. Her work focused on agricultural and labor economics in the Indian state of Haryana.

== Biography and education ==
Sheila Scott was born in 1933 in Canada. Her father, J.C. W. Scott, was a physicist. She met her husband, the Indian economist, G.S. Bhalla, while they were both undertaking post-graduate research at the London School of Economics. After her marriage, she moved to India with Bhalla, and lived there for the rest of her life. During her time in India, she became fluent in the Panjabi language. She died in 2021, in Puducherry, India.

== Career ==
In 1969, Bhalla and her husband both joined the faculty of Panjab University, where they taught economics. They were closely involved in establishing a teachers' union at Panjab University. In the late 1970s, they both moved to Jawaharlal Nehru University, where Bhalla taught until her retirement in 1992. At Jawaharlal Nehru University, she headed the then newly established Centre for Economic Studies and Planning. She also taught at the Institute of Human Development.

Bhalla's research and work related to agricultural economics, with a special focus on the state of Haryana, India. Along with her husband, in 1974, at Panjab University, she published a pioneering study on the impact of the Green Revolution on agrarian structures in Haryana. At Jawaharlal Nehru University, she continued to work on analyzing agrarian structures in Haryana independently, and expanded the scope of her research to other agrarian states such as Andhra Pradesh. Bhalla's empirical research focused on the prevalence of long-term labour contracts in agrarian work, and later mapped declining demands for labor in modern agriculture. In 1995, she was elected to preside over the Annual Conference of the Indian Society of Labour Economics in India. In the early 2000s, she contributed research to multiple departments in the Indian Government on labor diversification in agrarian fields, including research on informal labor for the National Commission for Enterprises in the Unorganised Sector. Her contributions to Indian agricultural and labor economics are notable, particularly for her use of large data sets and field surveys in analyzing labor participation. Bhalla's research has been published in Economic and Political Weekly, The Journal of Peasant Studies, Social Scientist, and the Indian Journal of Labor Economics.

Bhalla was also closely involved with agricultural labor movements and unionization, and worked with the All India Kisan Sabha, consulting with them on economic research relating to labour, agriculture, as well as the All India Agricultural Workers Union. She also published research documenting early trade union movements in these organizations, and participated in their activities, including protests. Bhalla vocally supported the 2020–2021 Indian farmers' protest. In 2014, Bhalla wrote for the Economic and Political Weekly, flagging significant concerns about the functioning of the Indian National Sample Survey Office, which is responsible for collecting public statistics about the Indian economy. In 2019, she was one of a group of 250 scholars and civil servants who wrote to the Indian Government to flag concerns about weaknesses in the functioning of the MNREGA, which is a rural employment guarantee scheme in India.
