= Save Lakshadweep campaign =

Protest in India

- Location: India
- Caused by: New administrative reforms announced by the Union Territory of Lakshadweep administrator Praful Patel
- Goals: To cancel the new administrative reforms announced by the Union Territory of Lakshadweep administrator Praful Patel
- Methods: Demonstrations, Hunger strikes

Parties
People of Lakshadweep; Indian National Congress; National Congress Party Local wing of Bharatiya Janata Party; Communist Party of India (Marxist)	Administrator of Lakshadweep: Kavarathi Police; Supported by: Bharatiya Janata Party

The save Lakshadweep campaign is a protest against the administrative reforms announced by the Union Territory of Lakshadweep administrator Praful Khoda Patel, which protesters describe as anti-people. The protests, under the 'Save Lakshadweep campaign', have intensified with more prominent personalities supporting the campaign.

Following the appointment of Praful Khoda Patel as the Administrator of Lakshadweep in December 2020, Patel's administration ended mandatory quarantine for those entering the territory, and allowed anyone with a negative RT-PCR test to travel to the islands.

The territory had its first COVID-19 case on 18 January 2021, and total cases had reached 7300 by the end of May. Mohammed Faizal P. P., Member of Parliament for Lakshadweep, attributed the rise in cases to the loosening of travel restrictions; the administration said that the surge was instead caused by the emergence of a more virulent SARS-CoV-2 strain, resumption of economic activity, and an increase in cases in Kerala, which is the territory's main link to mainland India.

Patel has also suggested policy changes such as instructing port authorities to cut ties with Beypore port and Cochin Port in Kerala and divert all maritime exchanges to New Mangalore Port. All dairy farms on the islands, run by the Animal Husbandry Department, were ordered to be shut down, with the cattle to be auctioned off, and dairy products instead to be imported from Gujarat-based Amul. Patel's administration also lifted alcohol restrictions, and banned beef, and removed the meat from the school Midday Meal Scheme. Many locals accused the administration of implementing a Hindutva agenda. Patel's administration also demolished fishermen's coastal sheds, citing violations of the Coast Guard Act. The Administration has argued that these policies are still in pipeline and yet to be implemented.

Opposition political parties such as the Indian National Congress and the Communist Party of India (Marxist) have come out in protest. Some local members of the Bharatiya Janata Party in Lakshadweep also voiced their criticism against Patel’s policies. Following the controversy, the All India Congress Committee submitted a request to the Lakshadweep administration seeking permission to visit the island, but their request was rejected citing the COVID-19 situation in the island.
