= Letter of understanding =

Formal text that sums up the terms and understanding of a contract

A Letter of Understanding (LOU) is a formal text that sums up the terms of an undertakings of a contract which may have been negotiated up to this point only in spoken form or otherwise informally. It reviews the terms of an agreement for a service, a project or a deal and is often written as a step before a more detailed contract is issued.

The LOU may provide for example:

- Detailed summary of the work to be performed
- Tasks of the service provider and the receiver
- Milestones for the work to be done
- Work steps that have been accomplished already
