= Enforcement Directorate =

Law enforcement agency and economic intelligence agency of India

Enforcement Directorate प्रवर्तन निदेशालय
- Logo of Enforcement Directorate
- Abbreviation: ED

Agency overview
- Formed: 1 May 1956 (70 years ago)
- Legal personality: Government agency

Jurisdictional structure
- Federal agency: India
- Operations jurisdiction: India
- Governing body: Government of India
- Constituting instruments: Foreign Exchange Management Act, 1999; Prevention of Money Laundering Act, 2002; Fugitive Economic Offenders Act, 2018
- General nature: Federal law enforcement

Operational structure
- Headquarters: New Delhi, India
- Minister responsible: Nirmala Sitharaman, Minister of Finance
- Agency executive: Rahul Navin, IRS (IT), Director
- Parent agency: Department of Revenue, Ministry of Finance

Website
- enforcementdirectorate.gov.in

The Enforcement Directorate (ED) is a law enforcement and economic intelligence agency of the Government of India. Established on 1 May 1956, it is responsible for enforcing economic laws and combating financial crimes. The ED operates under the Department of Revenue, Ministry of Finance, with its headquarters in New Delhi.

The ED's primary mandate is to enforce two key laws: the Prevention of Money Laundering Act, 2002 (PMLA) and the Foreign Exchange Management Act, 1999 (FEMA). Additionally, it is tasked with implementing the Fugitive Economic Offenders Act, 2018 (FEOA).

== History ==
The Directorate of Enforcement (ED) was established on 1 May 1956, as an "Enforcement Unit" within the Department of Economic Affairs, Government of India. It was created to handle violations of exchange control laws under the Foreign Exchange Regulation Act, 1947 (FERA '47).

Initially, the unit was headed by a Legal Service Officer as the Director of Enforcement, assisted by an officer on deputation from the Reserve Bank of India and three inspectors from the Special Police Establishment. The unit started with two branches: in Bombay (now Mumbai) and Calcutta (now Kolkata).

In 1957, the unit was renamed as the "Enforcement Directorate", and a new branch was opened in Madras (now Chennai). The administrative control of the Directorate was transferred from the Department of Economic Affairs to the Department of Revenue in 1960. Over the years, the ED's mandate expanded. In 1973, FERA '47 was repealed and replaced by FERA, 1973. From 1973 to 1977, the Directorate was under the administrative jurisdiction of the Department of Personnel & Administrative Reforms.

With economic liberalization in the 1990s, FERA 1973 was repealed and replaced by the Foreign Exchange Management Act, 1999 (FEMA), which came into effect on 1 June 2000. The ED was entrusted with enforcing FEMA.

In 2002, the Prevention of Money Laundering Act (PMLA) was enacted, and the ED was given the responsibility of enforcing it from 1 July 2005. More recently, the Fugitive Economic Offenders Act, 2018 (FEOA) was passed, and the ED was entrusted with its enforcement from 21 April 2018.

Today, the Enforcement Directorate operates under the Department of Revenue, Ministry of Finance, Government of India, and plays a crucial role in combating economic crimes and enforcing economic laws in the country.

== Organizational Structure ==
The Enforcement Directorate (ED) is headed by the Director of Enforcement, who is an officer of the rank of Additional Secretary to the Government of India. The Director is responsible for overseeing the agency's operations and reports to the Department of Revenue, Ministry of Finance. The Director is assisted by several Special Directors, Additional Directors, Joint Directors, Deputy Directors, Assistant Directors, and Enforcement Officers. The organizational structure is designed to ensure efficient management and coordination across various regions and functions.

The ED's headquarters is located in New Delhi, and it has five regional offices in Mumbai, Chennai, Chandigarh, Kolkata, and Delhi, each headed by a Special Director. These regional offices oversee the operations of zonal offices located in various cities across India, including Pune, Bengaluru, Chandigarh, Chennai, Kochi, Delhi, Panaji, Guwahati, Hyderabad, Jaipur, Jalandhar, Kolkata, Lucknow, Mumbai, Patna, and Srinagar. Each zonal office is led by a Joint Director.

In addition to the zonal offices, the ED has sub-zonal offices in cities such as Mangaluru, Bhubaneshwar, Kozhikode, Indore, Madurai, Nagpur, Allahabad, Raipur, Dehradun, Ranchi, Surat, Shimla, Vishakhapatnam, and Jammu. These sub-zonal offices are headed by Deputy Directors.

The ED's organizational structure also includes specialized units such as the Headquarters Office, Coordination, Intelligence, System & Training, Adjudication, and the Special Task Force (STF), each managed by Joint Directors and Special Directors.

== Special Courts ==
The Prevention of Money Laundering Act, 2002 (PMLA) provides for the establishment of Special Courts to ensure the speedy trial of offenses under the Act.

=== Establishment and Composition ===
- Special Courts are established by the Central Government in consultation with the Chief Justice of the High Court.
- Each Special Court consists of a single judge appointed by the Central Government with the concurrence of the Chief Justice of the High Court.

=== Jurisdiction and Powers ===
Special Courts have exclusive jurisdiction to try offenses punishable under the PMLA. They follow the procedure prescribed in the Code of Criminal Procedure, 1973 (CrPC), for trials before a Court of Session.

==== Supreme Court Rulings ====
In several landmark rulings, the Supreme Court of India has clarified the extent of the ED's powers, particularly concerning arrests and custody of accused individuals.

- May 2024 Ruling on Arrest Powers: On 16 May 2024, the Supreme Court ruled that the ED cannot arrest an accused under Section 19 of the PMLA after a Special Court has taken cognizance of the complaint. If the ED seeks custody of the accused for further investigation, it must apply to the Special Court, which will decide based on the necessity of custodial interrogation.
- Conditions for Bail: The Supreme Court also clarified that the stringent conditions for bail under Section 45 of the PMLA do not apply if the accused appears before the Special Court in response to a summons. This ruling makes it easier for accused individuals to obtain bail in money laundering cases.
- Review of PMLA Amendments: The Supreme Court has also reviewed amendments to the PMLA, addressing concerns about specific provisions such as the requirement to provide information reports to the accused and the reversal of the presumption of innocence.

== Notable cases ==
=== Major Cases ===
- INX Media Case: The ED played a significant role in the investigation of the INX Media case, which involved alleged financial irregularities and corruption. The case led to the arrest of several high-profile individuals, including former Finance Minister P. Chidambaram.
- Vijay Mallya Case: The ED filed one of its longest charge sheets, approximately 5,300 pages, against Vijay Mallya, Kingfisher Airlines Ltd, and United Breweries (Holding) Ltd under the Prevention of Money Laundering Act (PMLA). The case involved allegations of money laundering and fraud.
- 2G Spectrum Case: The ED investigated the 2G spectrum allocation scam, which was one of the largest corruption cases in India. The investigation led to the prosecution of several politicians and business executives.
- PNB Scam: The ED was involved in the investigation of the Punjab National Bank (PNB) scam, which involved fraudulent transactions worth over ₹13,000 crore. The case led to the arrest of diamond merchants Nirav Modi and Mehul Choksi.

=== Asset Seizures ===
- Seizure of Assets: Over the past eight years, the ED has conducted over 3,000 raids and seized assets worth more than ₹99 crore under the PMLA.
- Byju's Case: On 21 November 2023, the ED issued a show-cause notice of ₹9,362 crore to Think & Learn, the company behind Byju's education platform, and its founder Byju Raveendran for alleged violations of forex rules while attracting foreign investments.

=== Legislative Impact ===
- Strengthening of Laws: The ED's investigations have led to significant legislative changes, including amendments to the Prevention of Money Laundering Act (PMLA) and the introduction of the Fugitive Economic Offenders Act (FEOA) in 2018. These laws have strengthened the agency's ability to combat economic crimes and ensure compliance with financial regulations.

== Conviction rate and allegations of misuse ==
=== Conviction rate ===
The Enforcement Directorate has reported a high conviction rate in money laundering cases, but this figure is based on a small number of completed trials. As of 31 January 2023, the ED had registered 5,906 Enforcement Case Information Reports (ECIRs) and arrested 513 persons. However, only a small fraction of these cases have completed trial. In July 2023, data shared by the Central government in Parliament revealed that only 31 cases under the Prevention of Money Laundering Act (PMLA) had completed trial in the previous nine years. Of these, 29 resulted in convictions, yielding a conviction rate of 93.54%. While this rate exceeds the 57% national conviction rate for offences under the Indian Penal Code (IPC), only 0.52% of PMLA cases have completed trial, compared to 10.5% of IPC cases.

=== Allegations of political misuse ===
The ED has faced accusations of being used as a political tool, particularly against opposition parties. Critics argue that the agency has been selectively targeting opposition leaders, conducting raids, and making arrests, especially during election periods. In March 2024, 14 opposition parties filed a petition with the Supreme Court alleging misuse of the ED. Senior advocate A M Singhvi, representing the petitioners, argued that the number of politicians investigated by the ED had drastically risen after 2014, with 95% of those investigated belonging to opposition parties.

The allegations of misuse have been further fueled by incidents such as the one in August 2023, when Minister of State for External Affairs Meenakshi Lekhi from the Bharatiya Janata Party (BJP) warned opposition members during a parliamentary debate, saying, "keep quiet, or ED may arrive at your home." Various political commentators have pointed out if financial-crime powers exercised by the ED can be fairly used.

== Acts of parliament governing the ED ==
- Foreign Exchange Management Act, 1999 (FEMA)

== See also ==
- Central Bureau of Investigation, anti organised crime which are international, multi-state or multi-agency
- Directorate of Revenue Intelligence, anti-smuggling
- Financial Intelligence Unit, anti money laundering
- National Investigation Agency, anti terrorism
- NIA Most Wanted
- Narcotics Control Bureau, anti drug trafficking
- Indian Intelligence Community
- Central Bureau of Narcotics

Other countries

- Federal Bureau of Investigation
- Financial Crimes Enforcement Network
- Office of Foreign Assets Control
- United States Secret Service
- Serious Fraud Office (United Kingdom)
- National Crime Agency
- National Police Agency (Japan)
- Federal Criminal Police Office (Germany)
