= Karjat, Ahmednagar =

Village in Maharashtra, India

Karjat Karnagram
- town
- Location in Maharashtra, India Karjat (India)
- Coordinates: 18.55°N 75.00°E
- Country: India
- State: Maharashtra
- District: Ahmednagar

Government
  - Body: Nagar-Panchayat

Population
  - Total: 200,000

Languages
  - Official: Marathi
- Time zone: UTC+5:30 (IST)
- PIN: 414402
- Vehicle registration: MH-16
- Lok Sabha constituency: Ahmednagar
- Vidhan Sabha constituency: Karjat-Jamkhed
- Civic agency: Nagar-Panchayat
- Climate: Dry (Köppen)

Karjat is a town in Ahmednagar district in Indian state of Maharashtra. It is located 75 km from its District city of Ahmednagar. Rehekuri Sanctuary; a world-famous habitat for deer and there is a habitat for the Great Indian Bustard nearby.

Karjat city is socially developed and is the centre of educational institute in this central western region of Maharashtra state.

== Economy ==
Jowar and Bajra are the main crops cultivated in Karjat as it is a drought prone area. With recent development in irrigation channels, water from Ujani Dam, Kukdi and Ghod is now flowing into Karjat region thus facilitating growth of sugar cane, pomegranates, figs, grapes, sunflowers, and wheat in the adjacent areas.

Karjat region is also famous for sugar production and has a sugar mill named Ambikanagar sugar Pvt Ltd situated at Ambikanagar.

== Places of interest ==
=== Wildlife sanctuaries ===
There is a wildlife sanctuary dedicated to 'antelope and great Indian bustard' in the North of Town. There are Blackbucks and Great Indian Bustards in this sanctuary. Many rare wildlife are also there in this sanctuary. They include hyenas, pythons, Shekaroos (Giant squirrels), monkeys, baboons, jackals, wolves, chitals, peacocks and many rare birds including hariyals, mynas, bulbuls, doves.

Many wildlife lovers visit the town for its sanctuaries, particularly, during the months of September to January. it has area 2.17 km^{2}. great Indian bustard found there

=== Places of worship ===
Sri Sant Limbaji Maharaj Devasthan, which is dedicated to Jagurt and Reputed to be the God of Vows at Nimbe, is also very famous. Every year there is a big Yatra (Bhandara) on the Tuesday after Chaitra Poornima. According to Salabad, every year in the month of Baisakh, Dindi ceremony is held on foot from Sri Kshetra Nimbe to Sri Kshetra Pandharpur. Thousands of devotees and pilgrims participate in this wari. People from nearby villages throng every Sunday for darshan. The temple area here is very beautiful. Seeing orchards, tall trees, mountains, lakes fills the mind.

In close proximity to Karjat, there is a famous Ashtavinayak temple named Siddhatek. The temple is famous for its serene beauty. The idol in the temple is believed to be "Swayambhu"—not created by human hands. Siddhatek is situated on the banks of River Bhima. Mythology behind foundation of temple of Siddhatek is that once Lord Brahma created a world with Ganpati's blessings and while this was going on, Vishnu woke up and two fierce demons Madhu and Kaitaba escaped from his ears. Vishnu fought with them for 5000 years, then Lord Shiva pointed out that Vishnu had started without worshipping Ganpati, so Vishnu invoked Ganpati on Siddhatek hill and destroyed the demons successfully and consecrated the spot.

Also Rashin is famous for Goddess Jagadamba and pilgrims from all over the country visit regularly to Rashin all over the year. There is one very old Dargah of Peer Hazarat Dawal Malik on the northern outskirts of town. It is more than a thousand years old.

"Sant Sadguru Godad Maharaj Temple" is most Famous Temple in Karjat village. There is very big yatrostava in kamika ekadashi /or fifteen days later from ashadhi ekadashi of pandharpur. there is story that god vitthal comes to visit to Godad Maharaj on that day.
