= Prevention of Money Laundering Act, 2002 =

Act of the Parliament of India

Parliament of India
- Long title: An Act to prevent land laundering and to provide for confiscation of property derived from, or involved in, money-laundering and for matters connected therewith or incidental thereto.
- Citation: Act No.15 of 2003
- Enacted by: Parliament of India
- Enacted: 17 January 2003
- Assented to: 17 January 2003
- Commenced: 1 July 2005

Amended by
- The Prevention of Money Laundering (Amendment) Act, 2005, The Prevention of Money Laundering (Amendment) Act, 2009
- Status: In force

The Prevention of Money Laundering Act, 2002 (ISO: Dhana-Śōdhana Nivāraņa Adhiniyama, 2002) is an Act of the Parliament of India enacted by the Indian Government to prevent money laundering and to provide for confiscation of property derived from money laundering. PMLA and the Rules notified thereunder came into force on 1 July 2005. The Act and Rules notified thereunder impose obligation on banking companies, financial institutions and intermediaries to verify the identity of clients, maintain records and furnish information in prescribed form to Financial Intelligence Unit – India (FIU-IND).

The act was amended in the years 2005, 2009 and 2012.

On 24 November 2017, in a ruling in favour of citizens' liberty, the Supreme Court set aside a clause in the Prevention of Money Laundering Act, which made it virtually impossible for a person convicted to more than three years in jail to get bail if the public prosecutor opposed it. (Section 45 of the PMLA Act, 2002, provides that no person can be granted bail for any offence under the Act unless the public prosecutor, appointed by the government, gets a chance to oppose his bail. And should the public prosecutor choose to oppose bail, the court has to be convinced that the accused was not guilty of the crime and additionally that he/she was not likely to commit any offence while out on bail- a tall order by any count.) (It observed that the provision violates Articles 14 and 21 of the Indian Constitution)

== Objectives ==
The PMLA seeks to combat money laundering in India and has three main objectives:

- To prevent and control money laundering.
- To confiscate and seize the property obtained from the laundered money; and
- To deal with any other issue connected with money laundering in India.

== Key definitions ==
- Attachment: Prohibition of transfer, conversion, disposition or movement of property by an appropriate legal order.
- Proceeds of crime: Any property derived or obtained, directly or indirectly, by any person as a result of criminal activity relating to a scheduled offence.
- Money-laundering: Whosoever directly or indirectly attempts to indulge or assist other person or actually involved in any activity connected with the proceeds of crime and projecting it as untainted property.
- Payment System: A system that enables payment to be effected between a payer and a beneficiary, involving clearing, payment or settlement service or all of them. It includes the systems enabling credit card, debit card, smart card, money transfer or similar operations.

== Salient features ==
=== Punishment for money-laundering ===
The Act prescribes that any person found guilty of money-laundering shall be punishable with rigorous imprisonment from three years to seven years and where the proceeds of crime involved relate to any offence under paragraph 2 of Part A of the Schedule (Offences under the Narcotic Drugs and Psychotropic Substance Act, 1985), the maximum punishment may extend to 10 years instead of 7 years.

=== Powers of attachment of tainted property ===
The director or officer above the rank of deputy director with the authority of the director, can provisionally attach property believed to be "proceeds of crime" for 180 days. Such an order is required to be confirmed by an independent Adjudicating Authority.

=== Adjudicating Authority ===
The Adjudicating Authority is the authority appointed by the central government through notification to exercise jurisdiction, powers and authority conferred under PMLA. It decides whether any of the property attached or seized is involved in money laundering.

The Adjudicating Authority shall not be bound by the procedure laid down by the Code of Civil Procedure,1908, but shall be guided by the principles of natural justice and subject to the other provisions of PMLA. The Adjudicating Authority shall have powers to regulate its own procedure.

=== Presumption in inter-connected transactions ===
Where money laundering involves two or more inter-connected transactions and one or more such transactions is or are proved to be involved in money laundering, then for the purposes of adjudication or confiscation, it shall be presumed that the remaining transactions form part of such inter-connected transactions.

=== Burden of proof ===
A person, who is accused of having committed the offence of money laundering, has to prove that alleged proceeds of crime are in fact lawful property.

=== Appellate Tribunal ===
An Appellate Tribunal is the body appointed by Govt of India. It is given the power to hear appeals against the orders of the Adjudicating Authority and any other authority under the Act. Orders of the tribunal can be appealed in appropriate High Court (for that jurisdiction) and finally to the Supreme Court.

=== Special Court ===
Section 43 of Prevention of Money Laundering Act, 2002 (PMLA) says that the Central Government, in consultation with the Chief Justice of the High Court, shall, for trial of offence punishable under Section 4, by notification, designate one or more Courts of Session as Special Court or Special Courts for such area or areas or for such case or class or group of cases as may be specified in the notification.

=== FIU-IND ===
Financial Intelligence Unit – India (FIU-IND) was set by the Government of India on 18 November 2004 as the central national agency responsible for receiving, processing, analyzing and disseminating information relating to suspect financial transactions. FIU-IND is also responsible for coordinating and strengthening efforts of national and international intelligence, investigation and enforcement agencies in pursuing the global efforts against money laundering and related crimes. FIU-IND is an independent body reporting directly to the Economic Intelligence Council (EIC) headed by the Finance Minister.

== Criticism, controversies, and misuse ==
In July 2022, according to data shared by the Union government in Parliament, only 23 people have been convicted in 5,422 cases registered under the Prevention of Money Laundering Act (PMLA) in the 17 years after the law was passed—a conviction rate of less than 0.5%. Due to low conviction rate and the people against which the PMLA has been applied in last few years, lawyers argue that the PMLA is invoked against a political rival or a dissenter, because the "process is itself the punishment". The accused does not even know what allegations are put against them.

=== PMLA Misconduct on Scholars and Researchers ===
The Enforcement Directorate has been criticized for targeting scholars and activists. People are worried that the Prevention of Money Laundering Act (PMLA) is being misused to quiet those who disagree with the government. Many activists and scholars have signed a letter speaking against this. A big example of this is when researcher Navsharan Singh was questioned by the ED. Many people did not like this. People are now discussing the balance between safety and the right to speak freely. Many believe it's crucial to protect free speech in a democracy.

=== Justice Lokur Critiques PMLA Amendments ===
Justice Madan Lokur, a former judge of the Supreme Court of India, has raised significant concerns regarding the Supreme Court's decision to uphold the amendments to the (PMLA). As reported, in a conversation with journalist Karan Thapar, Justice Lokur pointed out what he perceives as major flaws in the judgment. He emphasized the potential implications of the decision, suggesting that it might have far-reaching consequences for the fundamental rights of citizens, especially in the context of property rights and fair trial principles. Justice Lokur's critique underscores the broader debate about the balance between national security interests and individual rights, highlighting the need for judicious scrutiny when interpreting laws that could impinge upon constitutional freedoms.

== ED's Arrest Powers Limited: SC ==
On 27 July 2022, The Supreme Court of India upheld the provisions of the act and retained the powers of the Enforcement Directorate under the PMLA, which was criticized for putting the personal liberty of citizens at risk by the undue process allowed by the provisions of PMLA.

On 22 August 2022, Supreme Court accepted a petition to review its 27 July 2022 judgement which upheld core amendments made to the Prevention of Money Laundering Act (PMLA). On 25 August 2022, Supreme Court said that two provisions, not providing a copy of the Enforcement Case Information Report to the accused, and reversal of the presumption of innocence, need reconsideration.

In a significant ruling, the Supreme Court of India clarified that Enforcement Directorate (ED) officials are not equivalent to police officers and hence, cannot make arrests under the Prevention of Money Laundering Act (PMLA). The apex court's decision came in response to the case presented by V. Senthil Balaji and liquor syndicate racket in Chhattisgarh. Emphasizing the importance of adhering to the rule of law, the Supreme Court stated that the ED cannot operate as "a law unto itself." This landmark judgment underscores the boundaries of power and authority vested in the ED, ensuring checks and balances in its operations.

== Similar laws in other countries ==
=== Money Laundering Control Act of 1986 ===
This is an Act of the United States Congress that made money laundering a federal crime. It criminalized money laundering for the first time in the United States.

- Established money laundering as a federal crime
- Prohibited structuring transactions to evade CTR filings
- Introduced civil and criminal forfeiture for BSA violations and other violations.
- Directed banks to establish and maintain procedures to ensure and monitor compliance with the reporting and record keeping requirements of the BSA

== See also ==
- List of acts of the Parliament of India
