= Ghalib Award =

Literary award named after Ghalib

- Award for individual contributions to Urdu and Persian literature
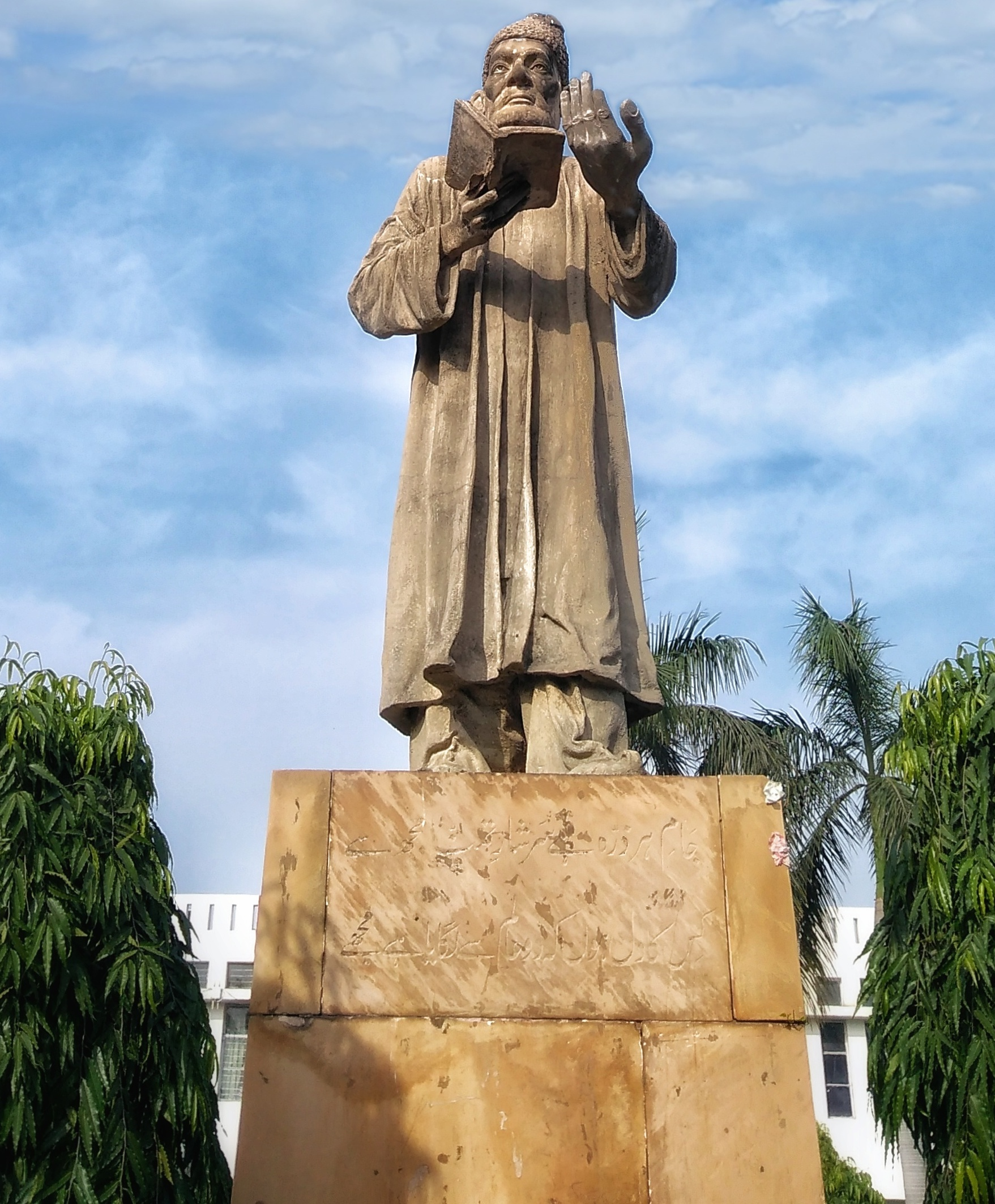
- Statue of Ghalib near Jamia Millia Islamia, Delhi
- Awarded for: "prose, poetry, criticism, drama, research."
- Sponsored by: Ghalib Academy (Ghalib Institute)
- Rewards: ₹25,000–50,000; Insignia; Citation; Commendation certificate
- Final award: 2019
- Website: ghalibacademy.com

Mirza Ghalib Award, commonly known as Ghalib Award, is a literary award and an honor in India presented annually in the month of December by Ghalib Academy (Ghalib Institute). It was established and named after a greatest Indian poet Ghalib. The award seeks to recognize those writers and researchers who have made "meritorious contribution" to Urdu and Persian literature. It carries an amount of cash reward ₹25,000 to 50,000 and an insignia along with a citation and a certificate of commendation.

It is generally announced by the Ghalib Institute Award Committee after a consensus, comprising uncertain number of the members and is conferred upon poets, writers and researchers at Aiwan-e-Ghalib, an auditorium in Delhi. It is recognized one of the highest awards in academic discipline, particularly in India.

== Recipients ==
- Sheila Bhatia (1983)
- Abul Kalam Qasmi, 2013.
- Bashar Nawaz

== See also ==
- Ghalib Museum, New Delhi
- Ghalib ki Haveli
