= Abul Kalam Qasmi =

Indian scholar, critic, and poet (1950–2021)

- Born: 20 December 1950; Darbhanga, Bihar, India
- Died: 8 July 2021 (aged 70); Aligarh, Uttar Pradesh, India
- Awards: Sahitya Akademi Award (2009); Ghalib Award (2013)

Academic background
- Education: Darul Uloom Deoband; Jamia Millia Islamia; Aligarh Muslim University

Academic work
- Main interests: Urdu literature, Urdu criticism
- Notable works: The Criticism of Poetry, Novel ka Fun

Abul Kalam Qasmi (20 December 1950 – 8 July 2021) was an Indian scholar, literary critic, and a poet of the Urdu language who served as the dean of the Faculty of Arts at the Aligarh Muslim University. He was the editor of Tehzeeb-ul-Akhlaq and authored books such as The Criticism of Poetry. He translated E. M. Forster's Aspects of the Novel into Urdu as Novel ka Fun. He was conferred with the Sahitya Akademi Award in 2009, and the Ghalib Award in 2013.

Qasmi was an alumnus of the Darul Uloom Deoband, Jamia Millia Islamia and the Aligarh Muslim University. He served as the head professor of the Urdu department of Aligarh Muslim University between 1996 and 1999. He was considered a major pillar of Urdu criticism.

== Biography ==
Abul Kalam Qasmi was born on 20 December 1950 in Darbhanga, Bihar. He received his primary education at Madrasa Qāsim al-Ulūm Hussainiya, and graduated in the dars-e-nizami from the Darul Uloom Deoband in 1967. He did his intermediate studies at the Jamia Millia Islamia and received a B.A. and an M.A. from the Aligarh Muslim University (AMU) in 1973 and 1975 respectively. His teachers included Anzar Shah Kashmiri.

Qasmi became a lecturer at the AMU in 1976 and was appointed a Reader in 1984, the same year he received his PhD degree. He compiled two course books for the university's Urdu department in 1980. In 1993, he was appointed a professor of comparative literature. He edited the Aligarh Magazine during 1975 and 1976 and served as the chief-editor of the bi-monthly magazine Alfāz, Aligarh from 1976 to 1980. Between 1983 and 1985, he was the chief-editor of Inkār, Aligarh. In 1996, he became the editor of Tehzeeb-ul-Akhlaq. He was a member of the executive council of the National Council for Promotion of Urdu Language from 1998 to 2003. He served as the head professor of the AMU's Urdu department from 16 June 1996 to 15 June 1999. He also served as the dean of the AMU's Faculty of Arts. Mujawir Husain Rizvi, who was a professor of Urdu literature at the University of Allahabad, would call him "Father of the Pen" (Abul Qalam), for his literary contributions.

Qasmi was considered a major pillar of Urdu criticism following on from Gopi Chand Narang and Shamsur Rahman Faruqi. He received the Bihar Urdu Academy Award in 1980, and the Uttar Pradesh Urdu Academy Award in 1987 and 1993. He was conferred with the Sahitya Akademi Award in 2009 for his book Mu'āsir Tanqīdi Rawayye. He received the Ghalib Award in 2013. He died on 8 July 2021 in Aligarh. Tariq Mansoor expressed sorrow and termed his death a great loss to the literary fraternity of India.

== Literary works ==
Qāsmi translated E. M. Forster's Aspects of the Novel into Urdu as Novel ka Fun.He authored books such as Kas̲rat-i Taʻbīr, Mashriqi She'riyāt aur Urdu Tanqīd ki Riwāyat, Mu'āsir Tanqīdī Rawayye, Shā'iri ki Tanqīd (The Criticism of Poetry) and Takhlīqi Tajruba. By 2010 Qāsmi had 125 research articles to his credit. His compiled works include:

- Azādī ke baʻd Urdū Tanz-o-Mizāḥ
- Mashriq kī Bāzyāft: Muḥammad Ḥasan ʻAskarī ke ḥavāle se (The Recovery of the East, with Reference to Muhammad Hasan Askari)
- Rashīd Aḥmad Ṣiddīqī, Shak̲h̲ṣīyat aur Adabī Qadr-o- Qīmat (Rasheed Ahmad Siddiqui, Life and His Literary Importance)
- Mirzā G̲h̲ālib: Shak̲h̲ṣiyat aur Shāʻirī (Mirza Ghalib: Personality and Poetry)
