= Aspects of the Novel =

1927 book by E. M. Forster

- First edition
- Author: E. M. Forster
- Translator: Abul Kalam Qasmi (Urdu)
- Language: English
- Subject: English literature
- Publisher: Edward Arnold
- Publication date: 1927
- Publication place: United Kingdom
- Pages: 224
- OCLC: 558996342

Aspects of the Novel is a book based on a series of lectures delivered by E. M. Forster at Trinity College, Cambridge, in 1927, in which he discusses the English language novel. By using examples from classic texts, he highlights what he sees as the seven universal aspects of the novel, which he defined as: story, characters, plot, fantasy, prophecy, pattern, and rhythm.

== Criticisms ==
Some critics have taken issue with the fact that Forster, as a renowned novelist, formulated a normative theory of how to write prose. W. Somerset Maugham commented that, having read the book, "I learned that the only way to write novels was like Mr. E. M. Forster." Virginia Woolf, reviewing Aspects of the Novel in Nation and Athenaeum, on the other hand, praised some aspects of the book. According to Woolf, Forster, unlike other critics, never exercises stern authority to save the lady (i.e. fiction), he merely acts as a casual friend who happens to have been admitted into the bedroom. Woolf concedes, however, that this is ultimately not very helpful when it comes to formulating rules: "So then we are back in the old bog; nobody knows anything about the laws of fiction".

== Notes ==
- Oliver Stallybrass, 'Editor's Introduction', in Aspects of the Novel (Penguin Books, 1980)
