= Bashar Nawaz =

Indian poet (1935–2015)

- Born: Bashar Nawaz; 18 August 1935; Aurangabad, Hyderabad State (now in Aurangabad, Maharashtra, India)
- Died: 9 July 2015 (aged 79); Aurangabad, Maharashtra, India
- Occupations: Poet; Writer; Lyricist
- Awards: Mirza Ghalib Award

Bashar Nawaz (18 August 1935 – 9 July 2015) was an Indian Urdu poet and lyricist, who penned the song Karoge Yaad in the Bollywood film Bazaar. He picked up the "Pulotsav Samman" and Ghalib Award for his contribution to Urdu literature.

== Career ==
He had written lyrics for a few Hindi films such as 'Bazaar', 'Lori' and 'Jane Wafa'. Ghulam Ali, Lata Mangeshkar, Mohd Aziz, Asha Bhosale, Talat Aziz, Bhupinder and Mehdi Hasan among others have given voice to his Ghazals.

He also wrote 13 episodes of the TV serial Amir Khusro, which was telecast on Doordarshan in 1983. Bashar also penned 26 episodes of the musical opera "Sare Jahan se Accha Hindustan Hamara", which was broadcast by All India Radio. He scripted a serial on Dr. Babasaheb Ambedkar, which was televised on Doordarshan in 2000.

Nawaz's poems have been translated into Marathi, Hindi, Punjabi and Kannada and published in journals and anthologies. As many as ten of his poems have been translated into English by Zaheer Ali. Anwar Saeed from Pakistan has made special mention of Bashar Nawaz in his book 'Short History of Urdu Literature'. His ghazals and poems have been included in almost all the anthologies of best Urdu poetry from 1960 onward, said noted Urdu poet Khan Shamim. On 9 July 2015, Bashar Nawaz died at the age of 79 in Aurangabad.

== See also ==
- Urdu literature
- Siraj Aurangabadi
- Rafat Saeed Qureshi
