= Faculty of Arts, Aligarh Muslim University =

Faculty of Arts
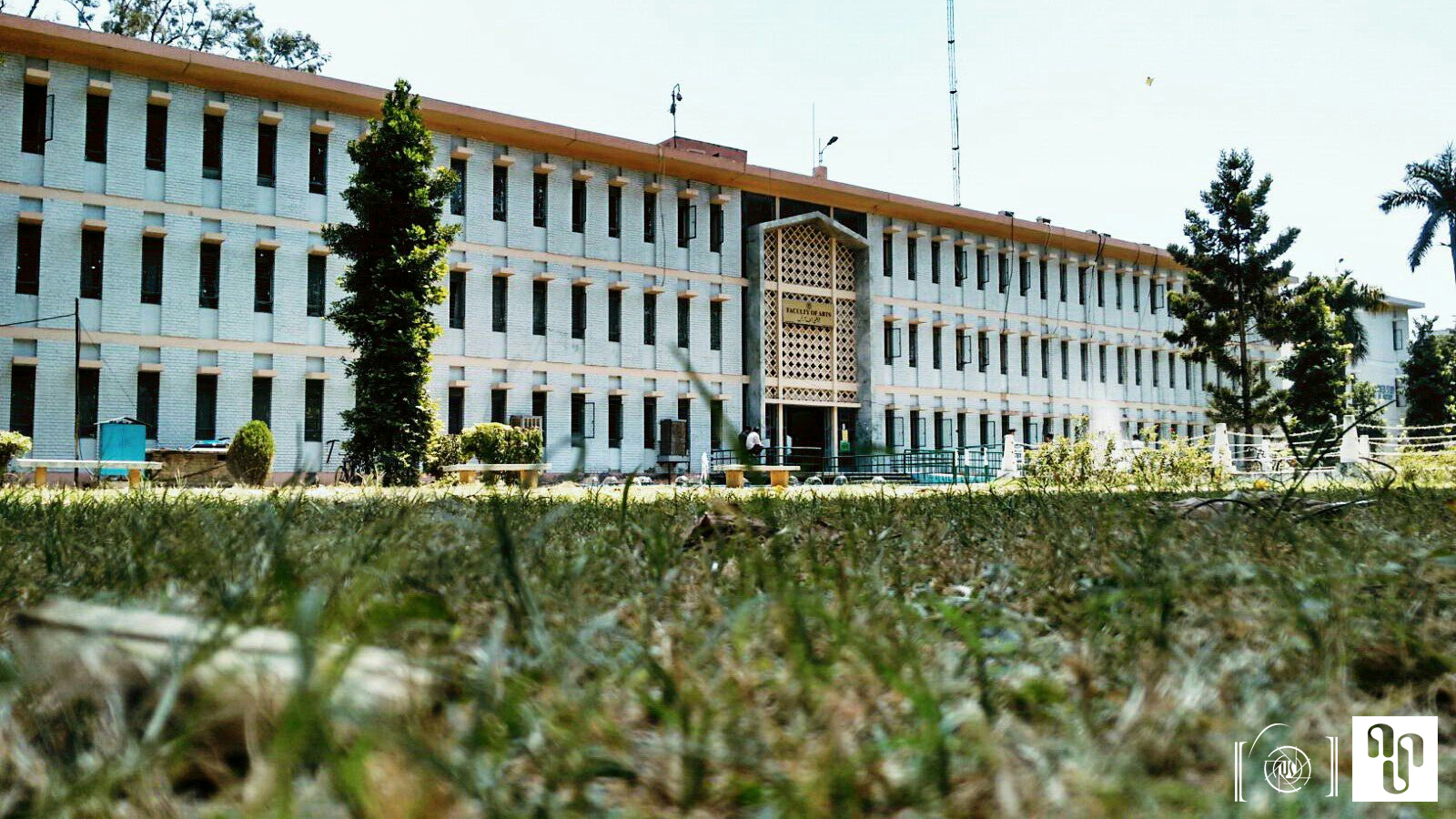
- Front view of Faculty of Arts, AMU 2014
- Type: Public
- Established: 1944
- Affiliations: Aligarh Muslim University
- Location: Aligarh, Uttar Pradesh, India
- Website: Official Website

Faculty of Arts is one of the faculties of Aligarh Muslim University comprising 10 departments. The faculty of Arts offers a number of courses in different language courses in the respective departments. The faculty is situated on the opposite side of Maulana Azad Library.

== Programs and departments ==
The Faculty of Arts offers different programs in respective departments which include:

- Three years honours program in Bachelor of Arts i.e. B.A. (Hons.)
- Two years program in Master of Arts (M.A.)
- Research programs for M.Phil. and Ph.D. and
- Number of diploma courses

The faculty has various departments of Arabic, English, Fine Arts, Hindi, Linguistics, Modern Indian Languages, Persian, Philosophy, Sanskrit and Urdu.

In 2013, the department of Fine Arts was ranked 10th in India's Best Fine Arts colleges listed by India Today.

== Department of English ==
Department of English is the oldest department of the university. The department dates back from the days of Muhammadan Anglo Oriental College- the predecessor of Aligarh Muslim University. Sir Walter Raleigh, the first professor of English at Oxford, had already worked as a professor of English at Mohammadan Anglo- Oriental College from 1885 to 1887. ‘Raleigh Literary Society’ regularly organises performances of scenes from Shakespeare’s plays.

== Alumni and faculty ==
Philosopher Syed Zafarul Hasan was a professor of Philosophy and had been the dean of the faculty of Arts.

== Facilities ==
The faculty has Wi-Fi, Lift for the physically disabled and library in every department and a canteen.
