= Ghalib Museum =

Mirza Ghalib Museum
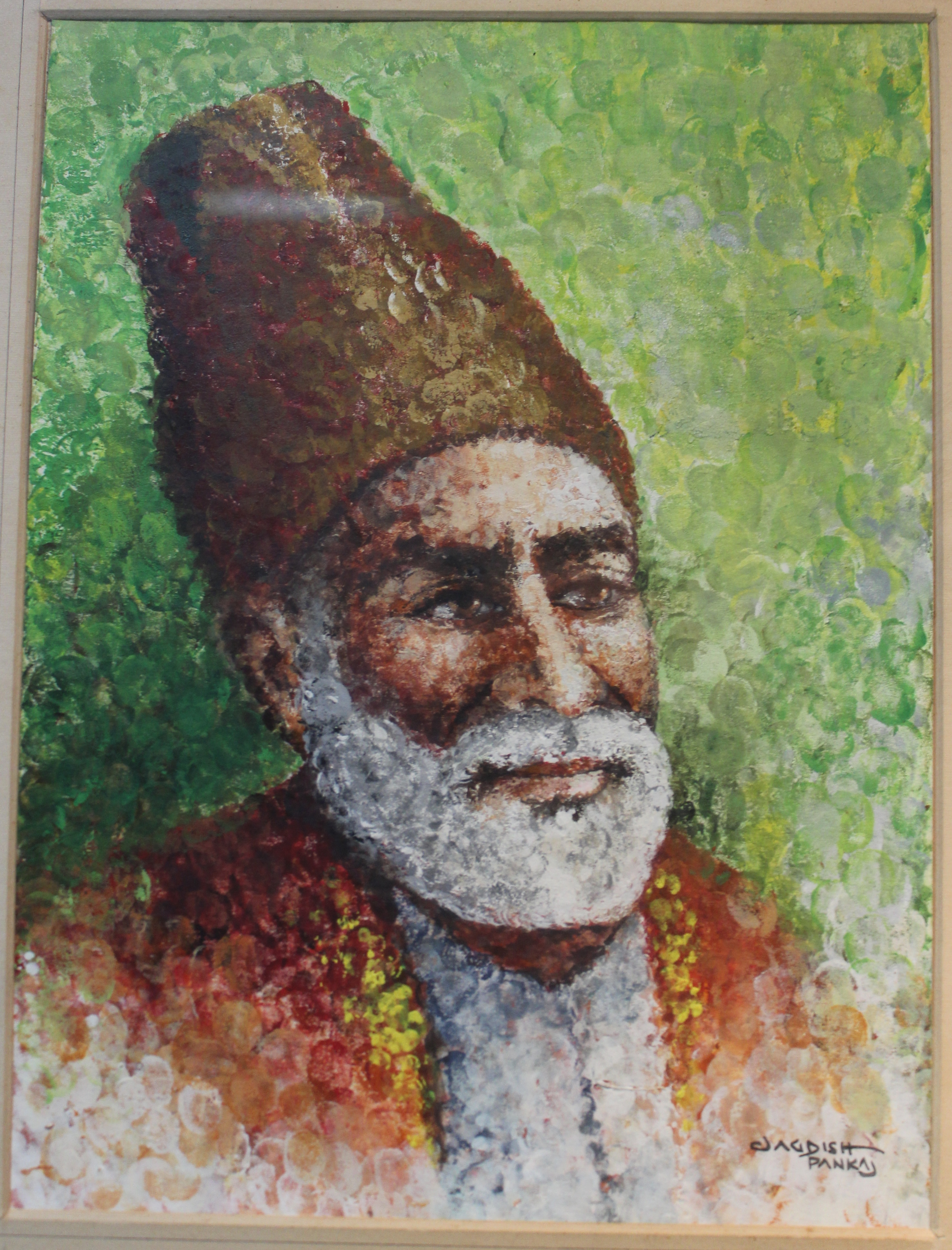
- Painting of Mirza Ghalib in Ghalib Museum
- Established: 22 February 1969
- Location: Nizamuddin (West)
- Coordinates: 28.591460°N 77.243253°E
- Type: Memorial
- Key holdings: Coins of Mughal Era, Handwritten Poems/letters of Ghalib
- Collections: Paintings, Calligraphy, Handwritten specimens
- Owner: Ghalib Academy, Delhi
- Public transit access: Jawahar Lal Nehru Stadium Metro
- Website: www.ghalibacademy.org

Mirza Ghalib Museum, Delhi is a museum on the life and times of the 18th century Urdu poet Mirza Ghalib, under the aegis of the Ghalib Academy, Delhi. The museum is situated in the vicinity of the tomb of the 13th century Sufi saint Khwaja Nizamuddin.

== About ==
The museum is housed on the third floor of the Ghalib Academy building. It was formally declared open by the 3rd President of India Dr. Zakir Husain on the occasion of the Ghalib Centenary on 22 February 1969. The museum presents pictures of Ghalib's residences, food habits and attires of the poet and his times. There are seals, coins dating to the mughal era, Postage stamps and specimen of handwriting housed in this museum. Paintings of renowned artists like those of M.F. Hussain, Jayant Parikh, Satish Gujral, Anis Farooqui are some of the main attractions of the museum. Ghalib's poetry calligraphy and other artworks based on Ghalib's poetry are also on display.

The mausoleum of Mirza Ghalib is just next to the Academy building. It lies in the attached courtyard of the building just on the way to the dargah of Nizamuddin. Humayun's Tomb is also within walking distance from the museum.

== Gallery ==
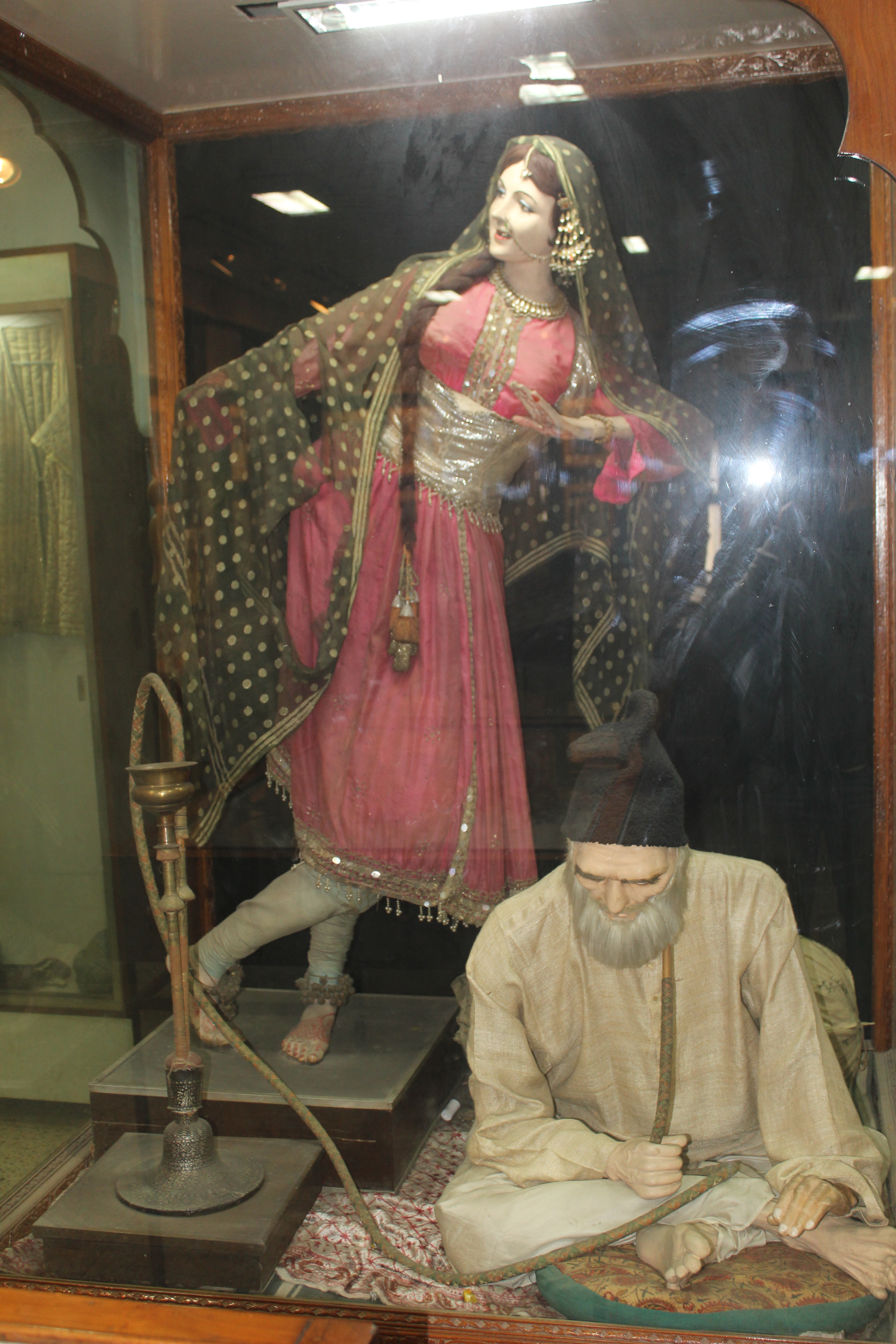

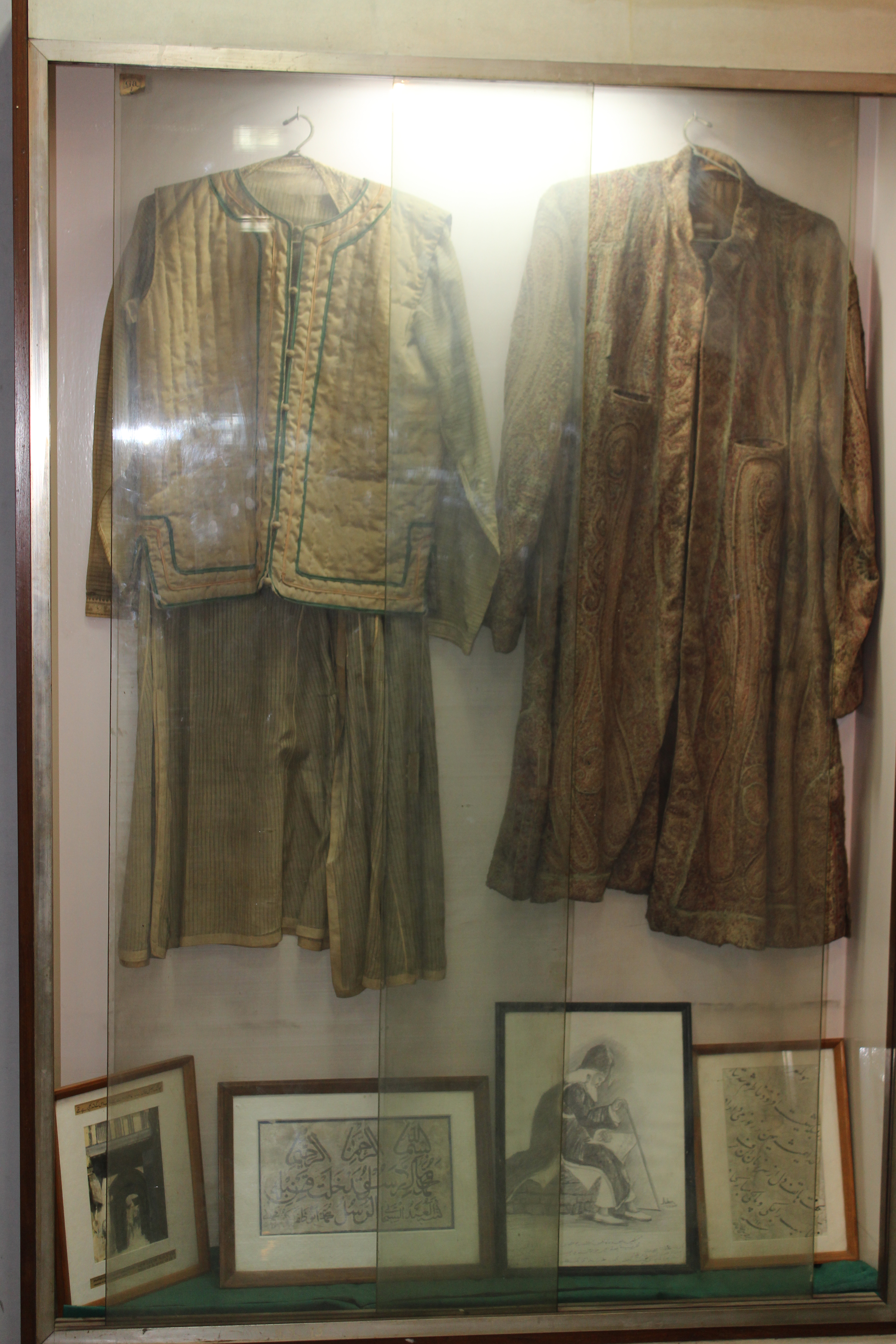

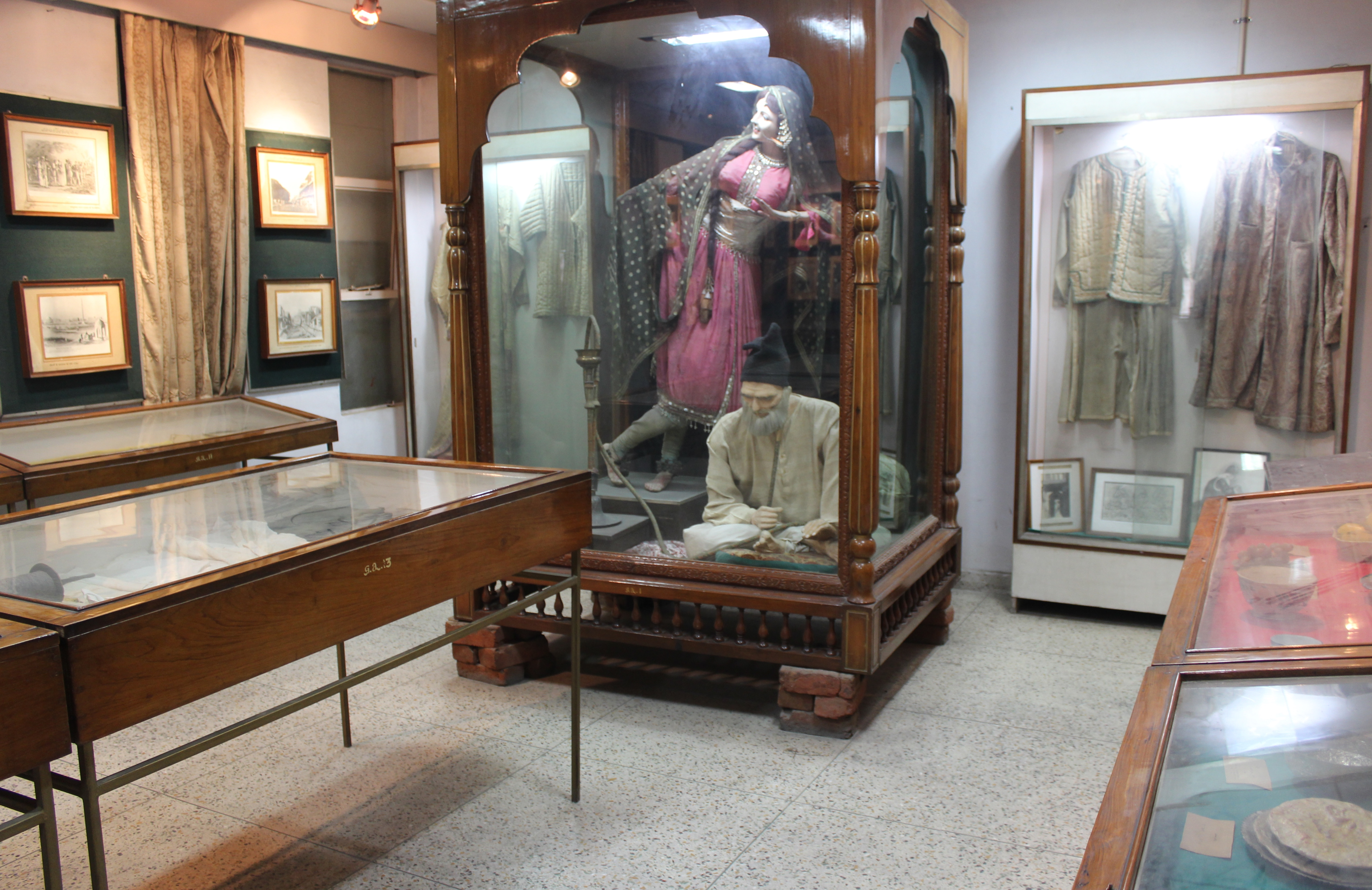

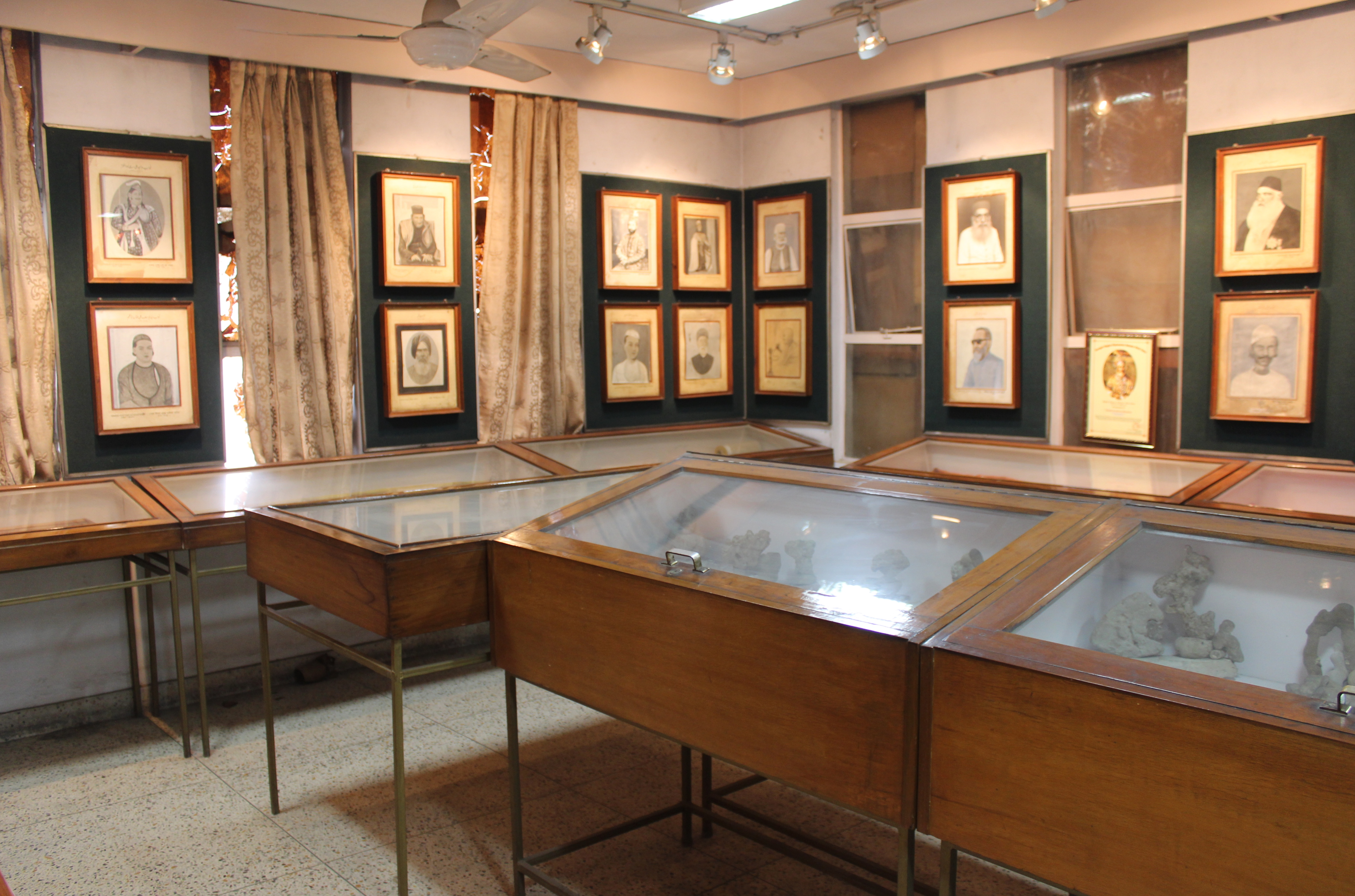

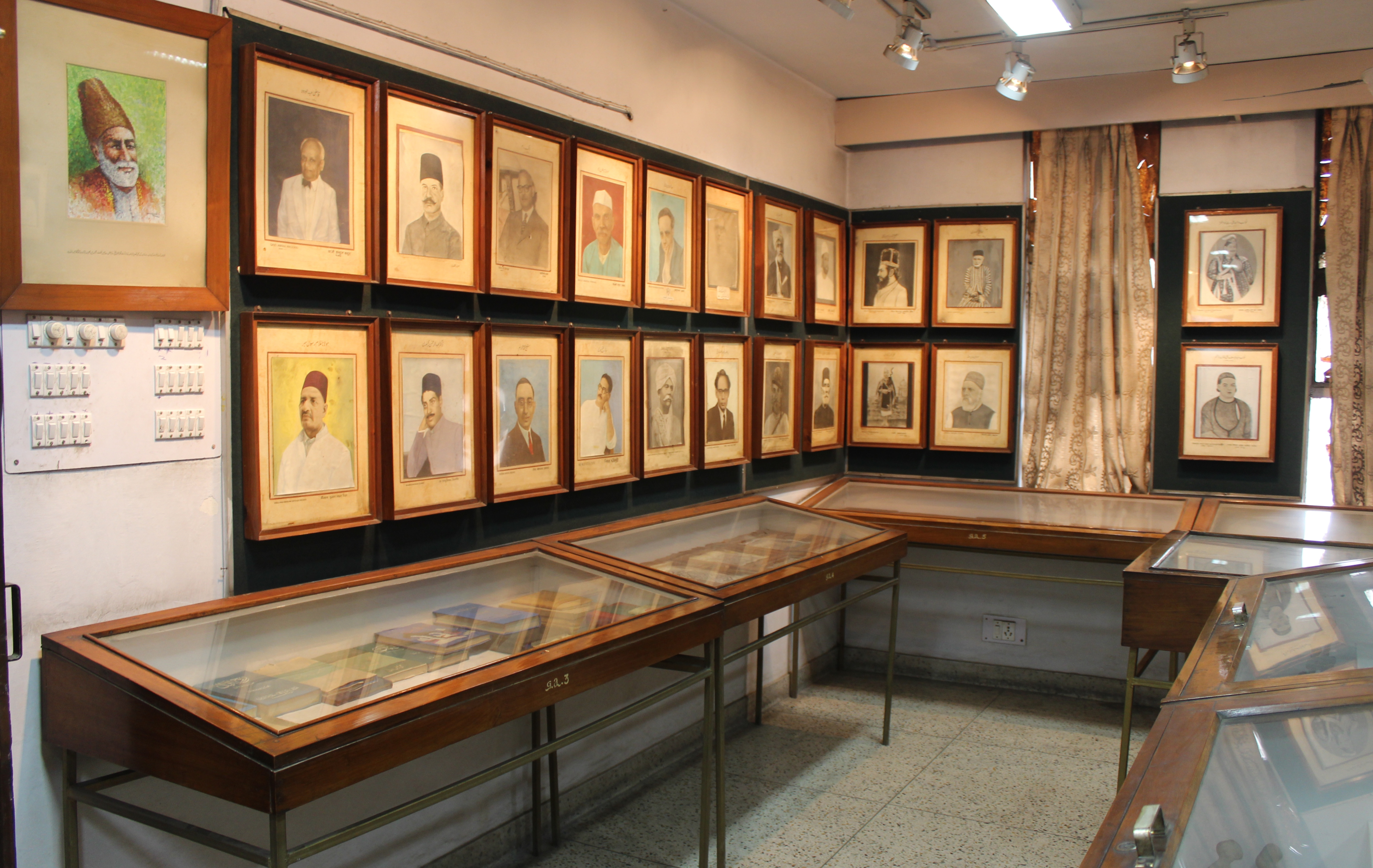

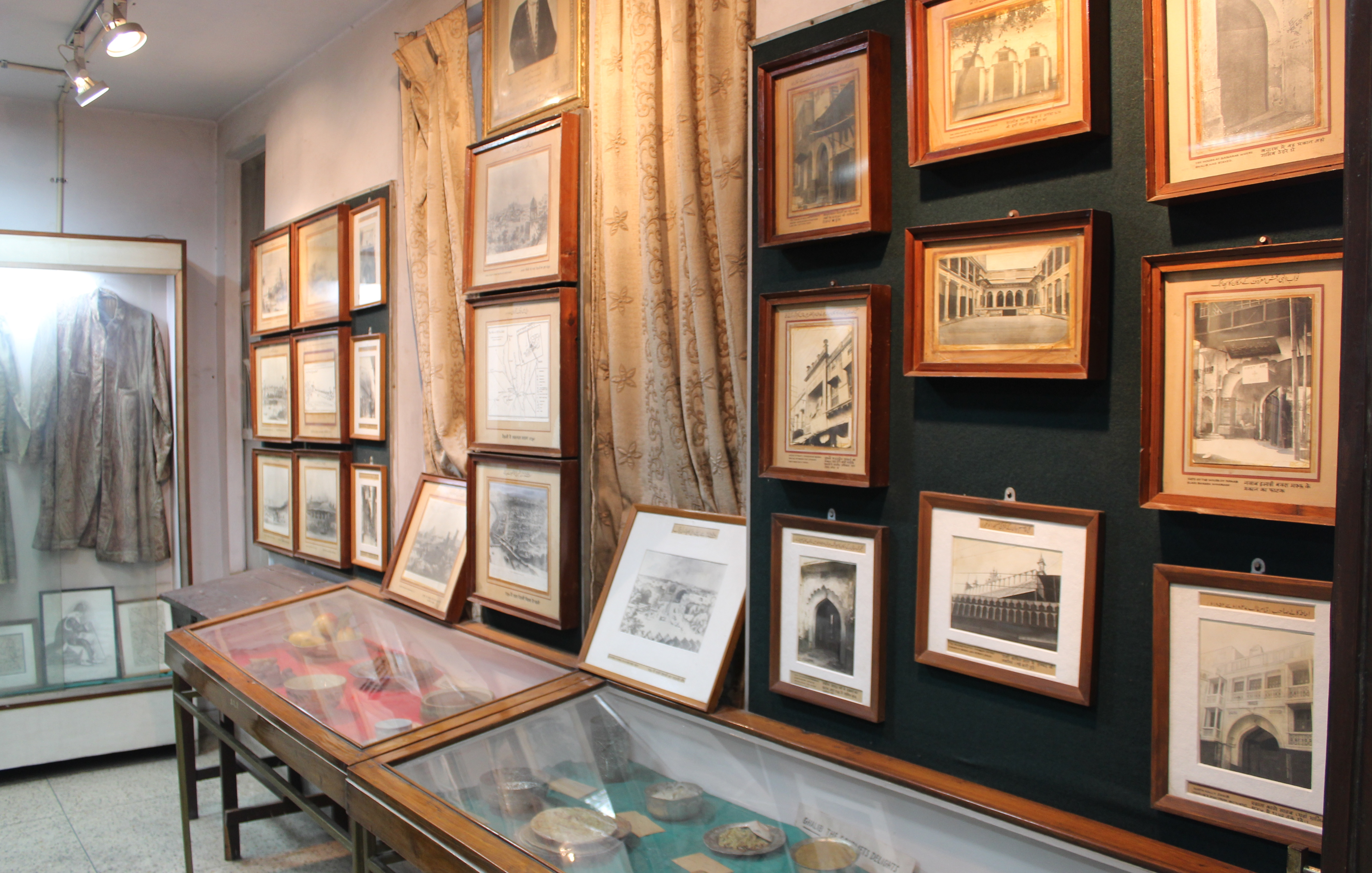

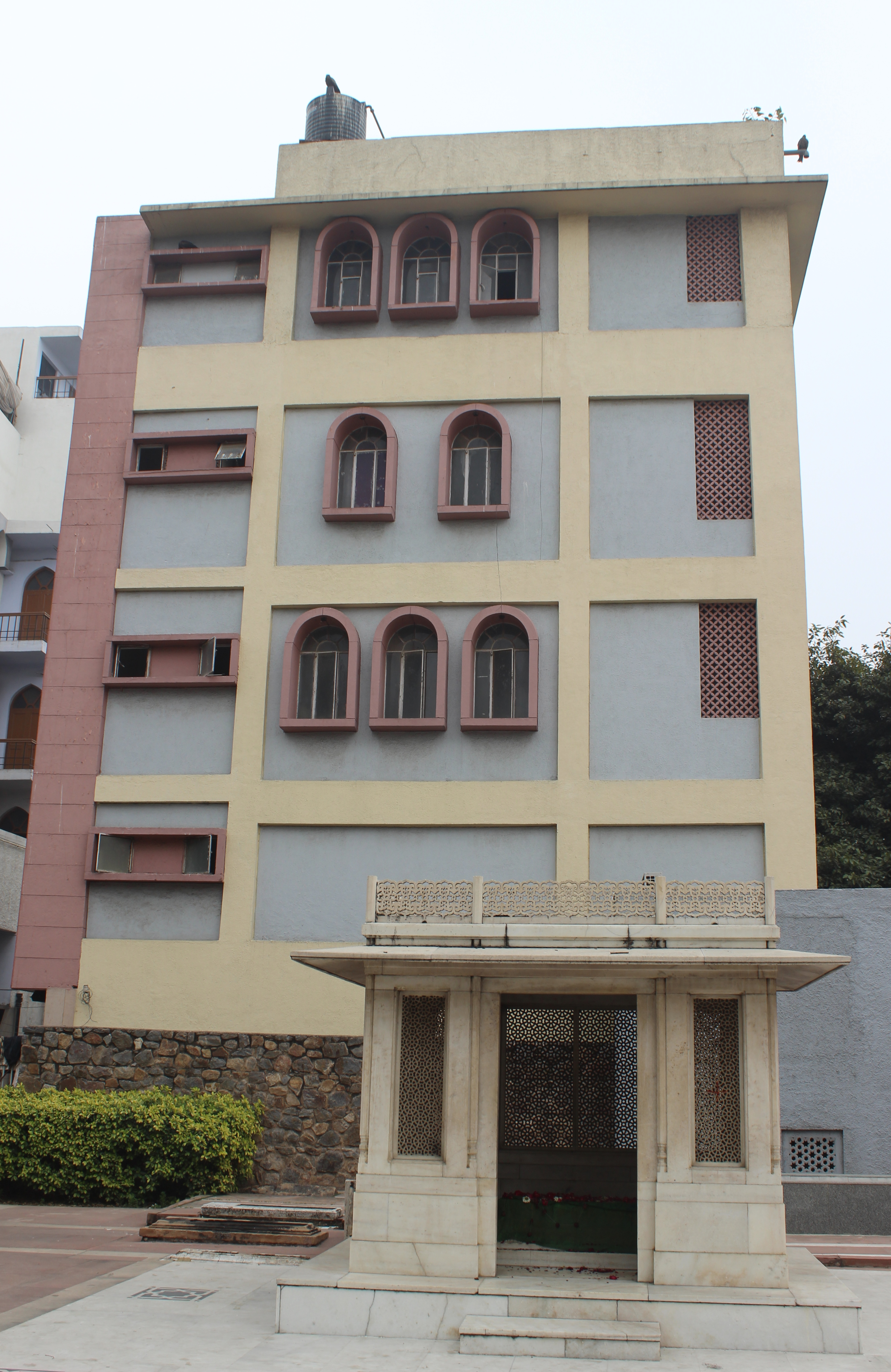

== Artefacts ==
- Calligraphy Works
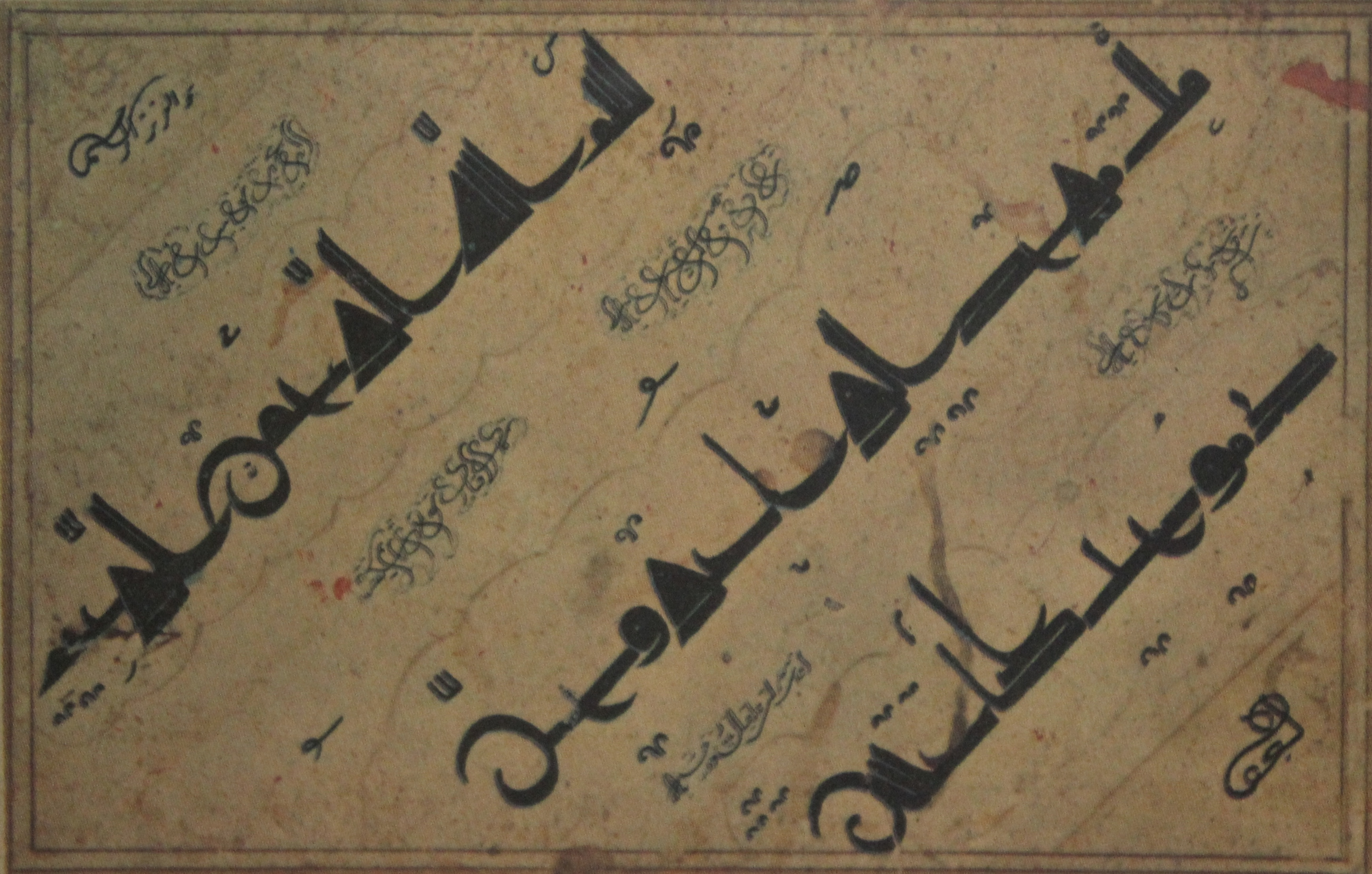

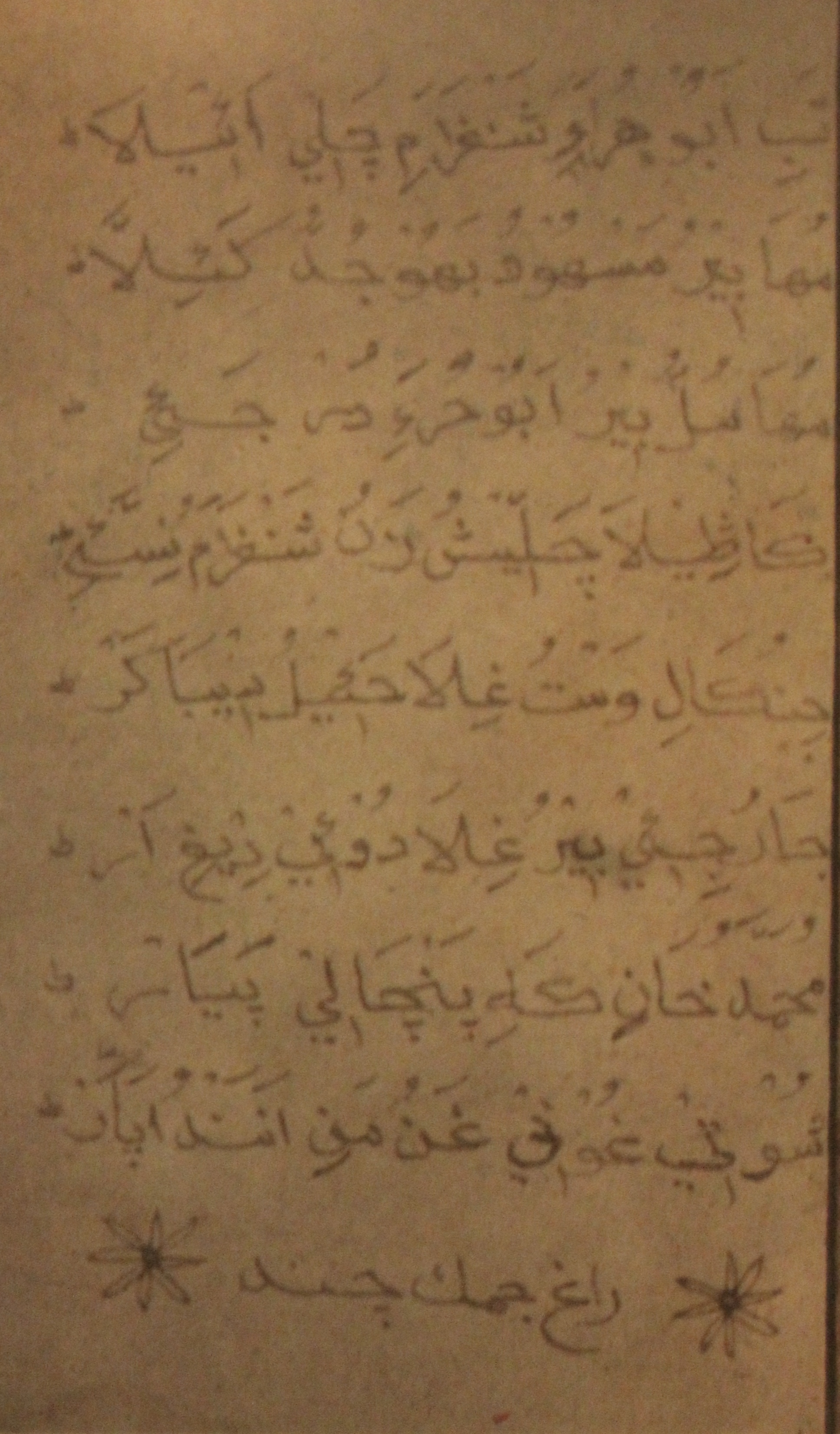

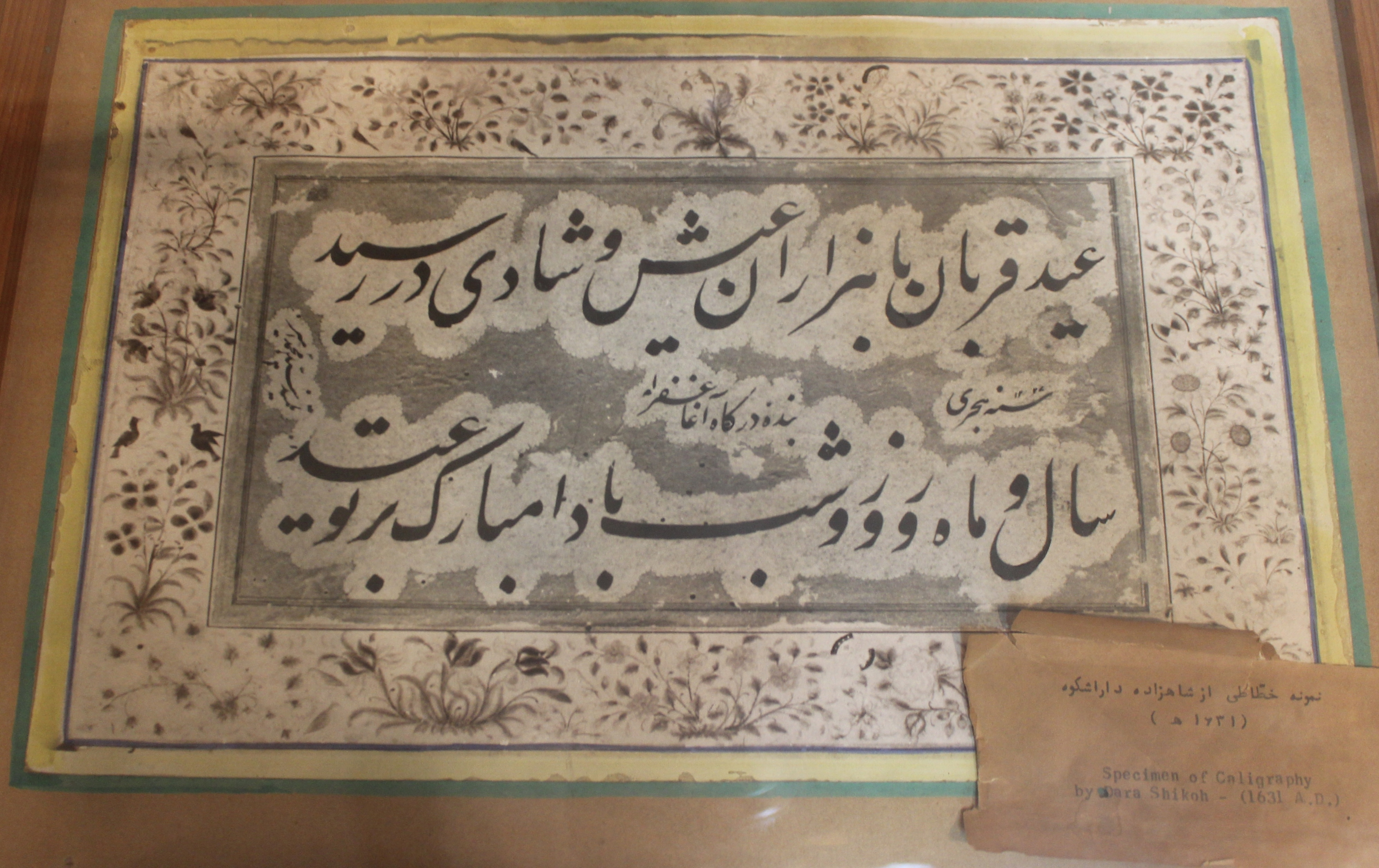

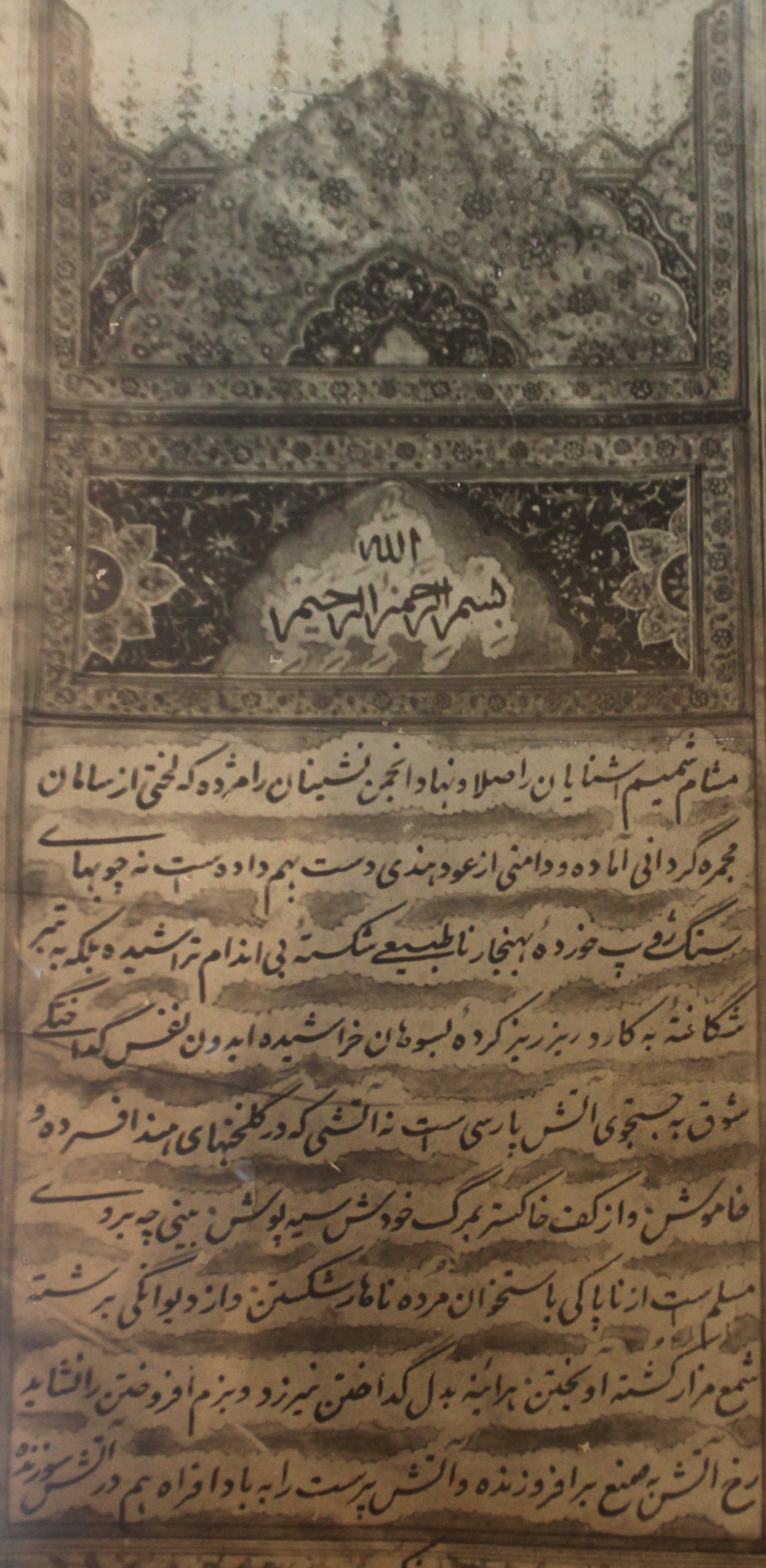
- Letters
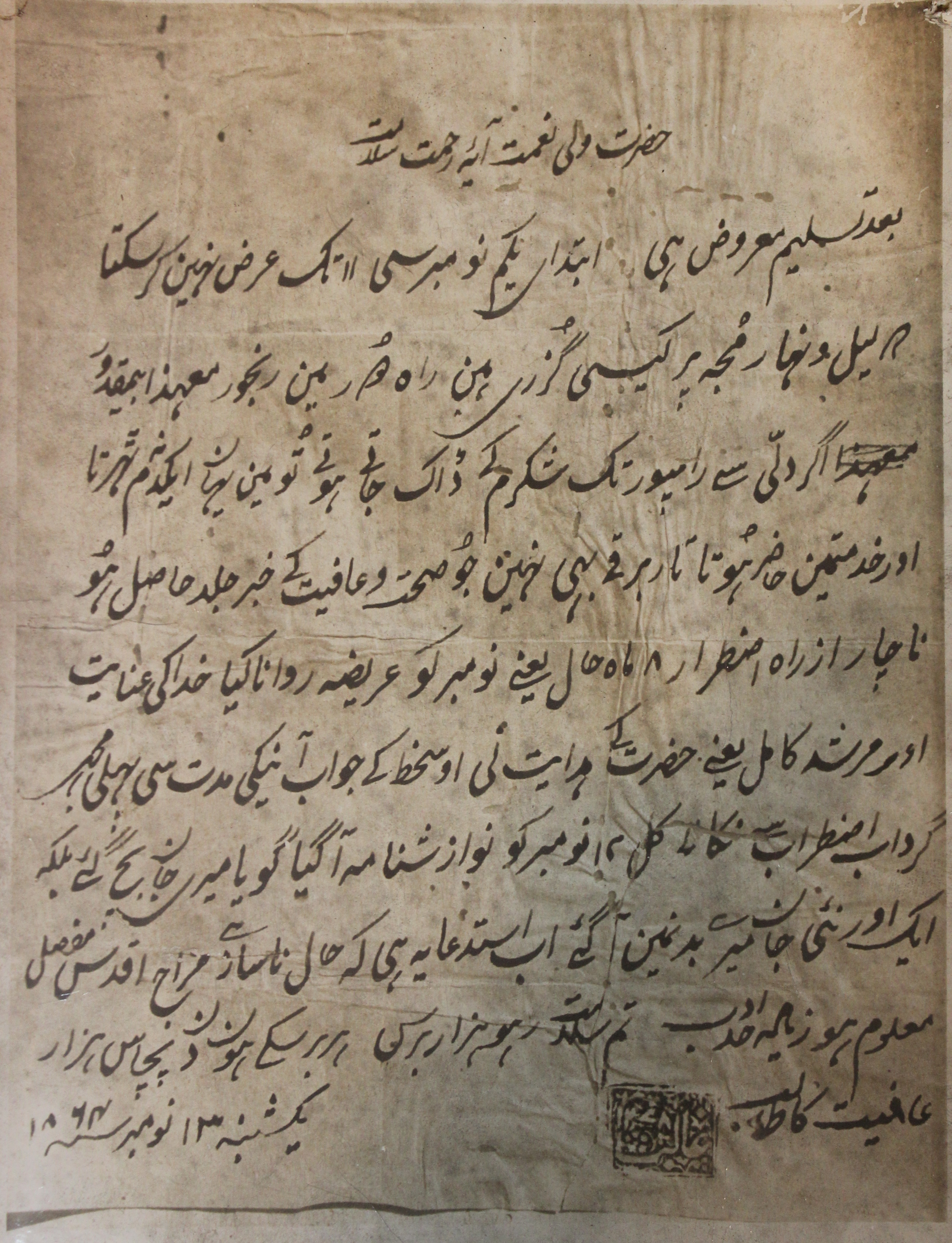

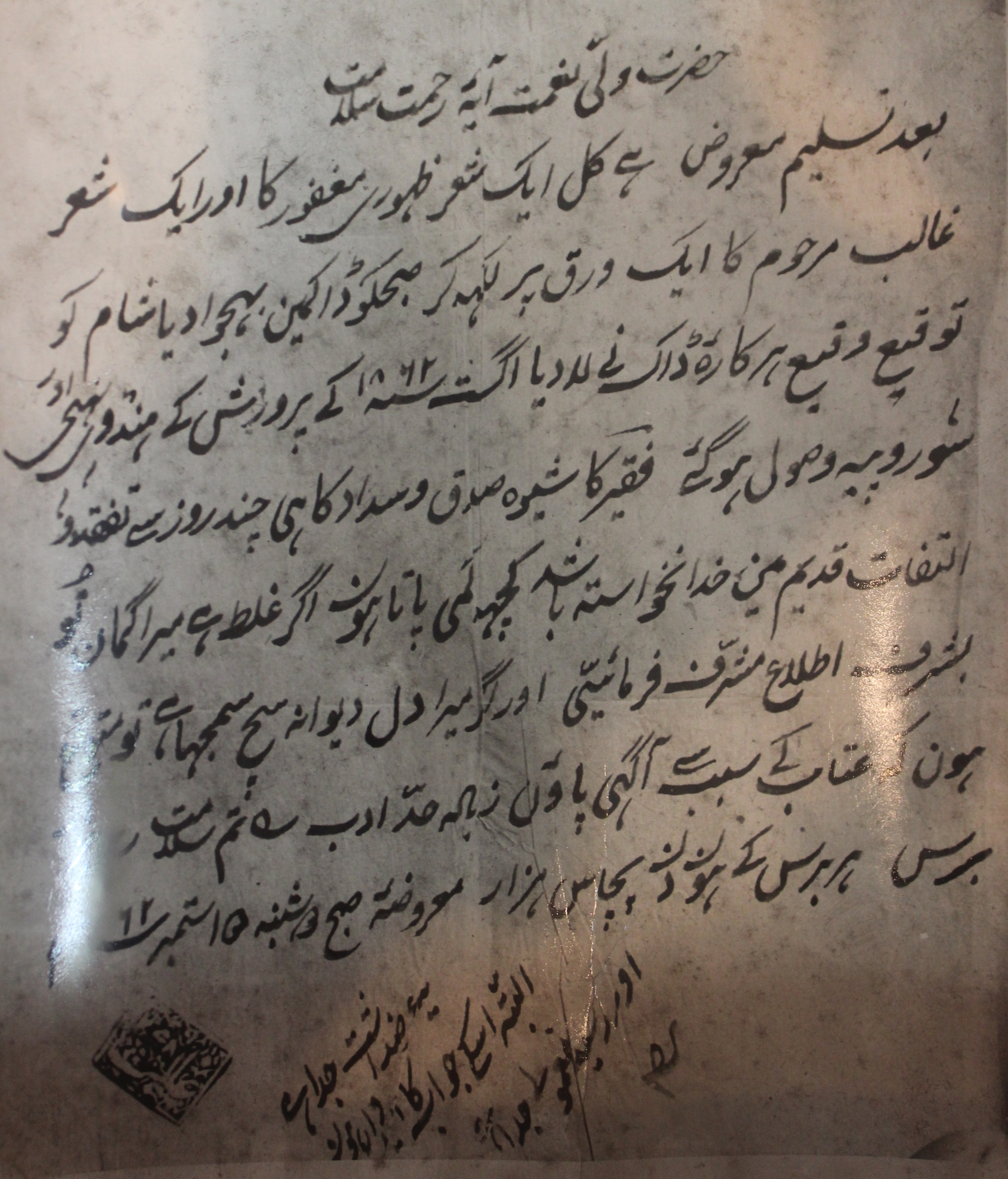

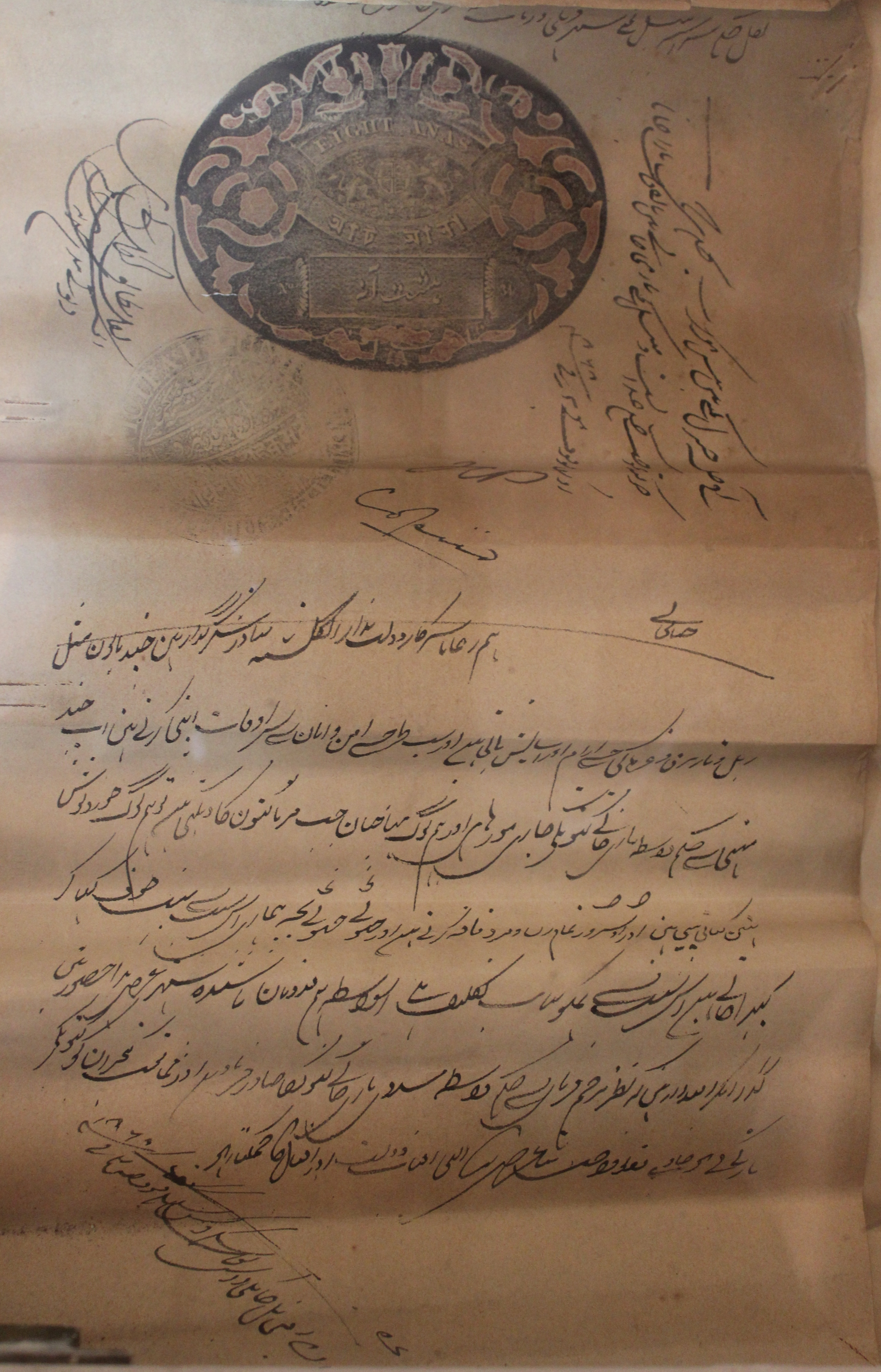
- Stamps
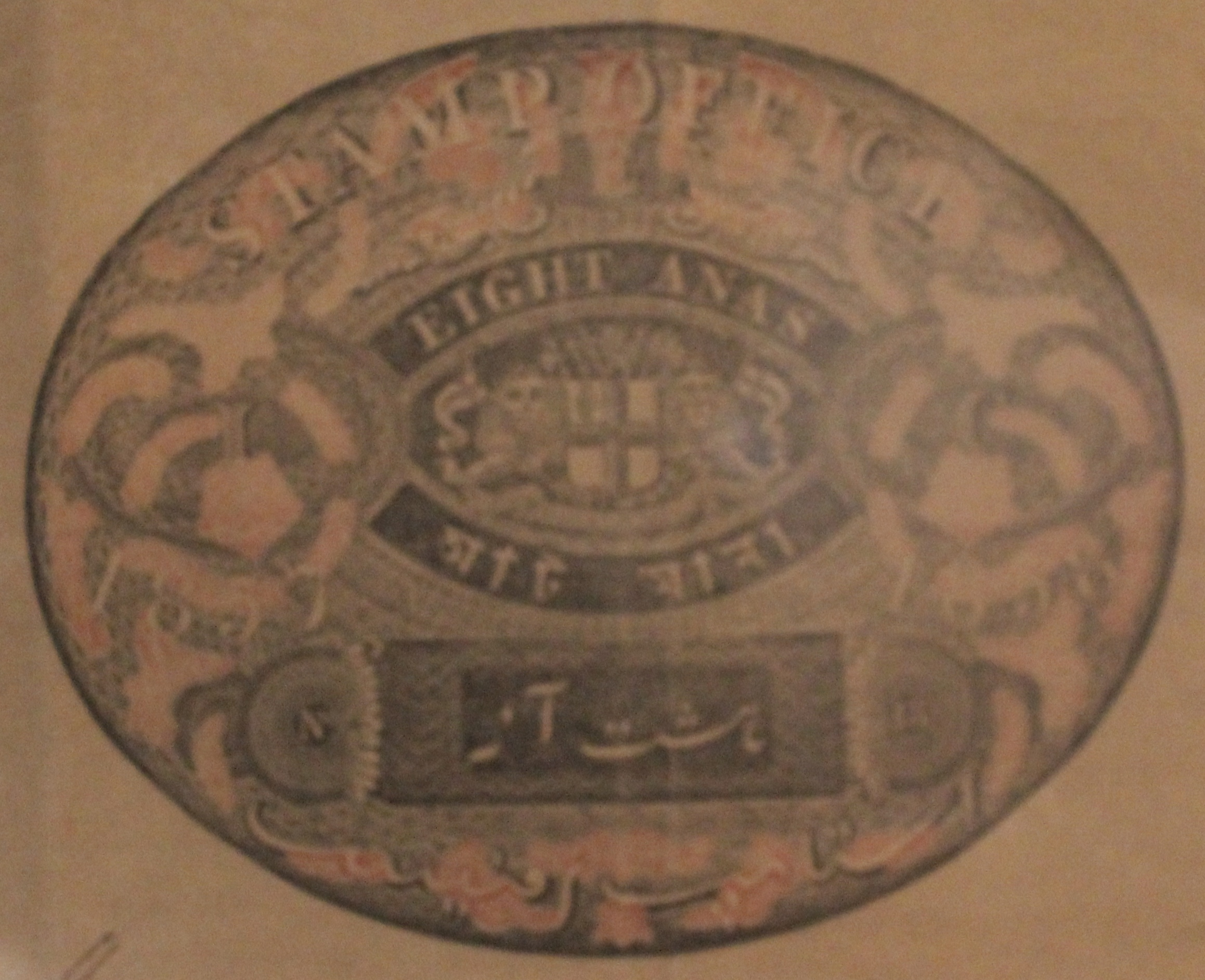

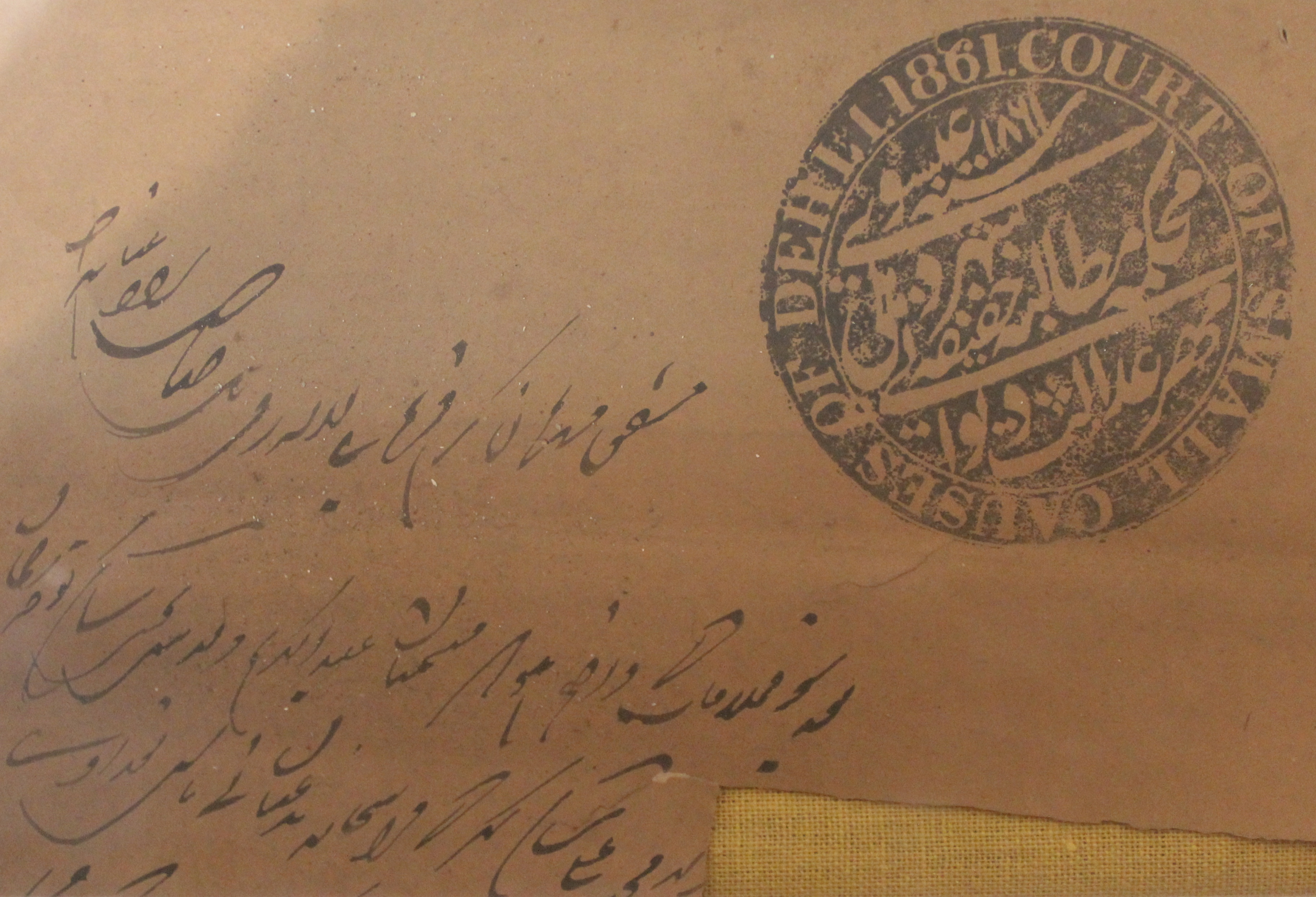
- Coins
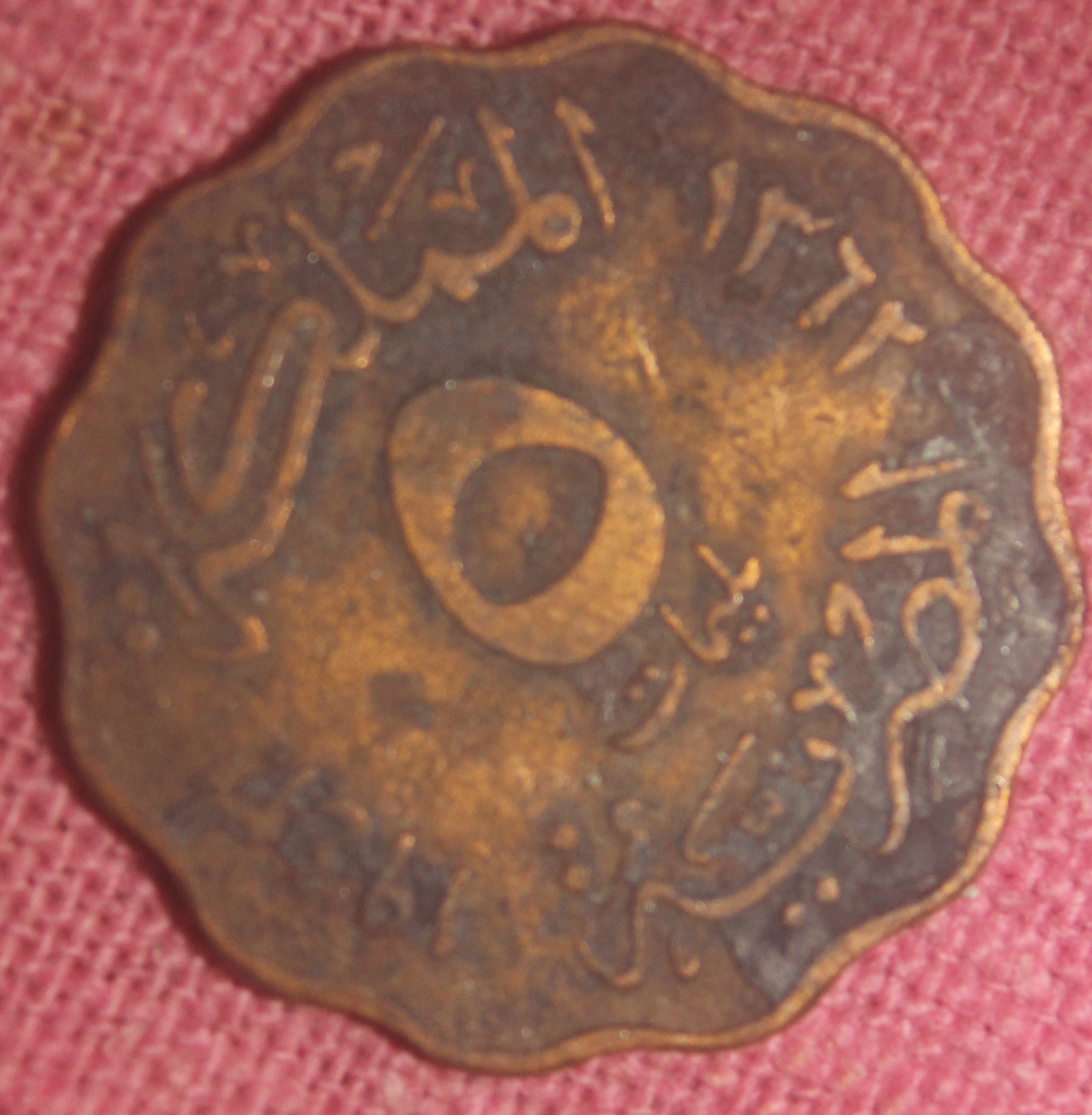

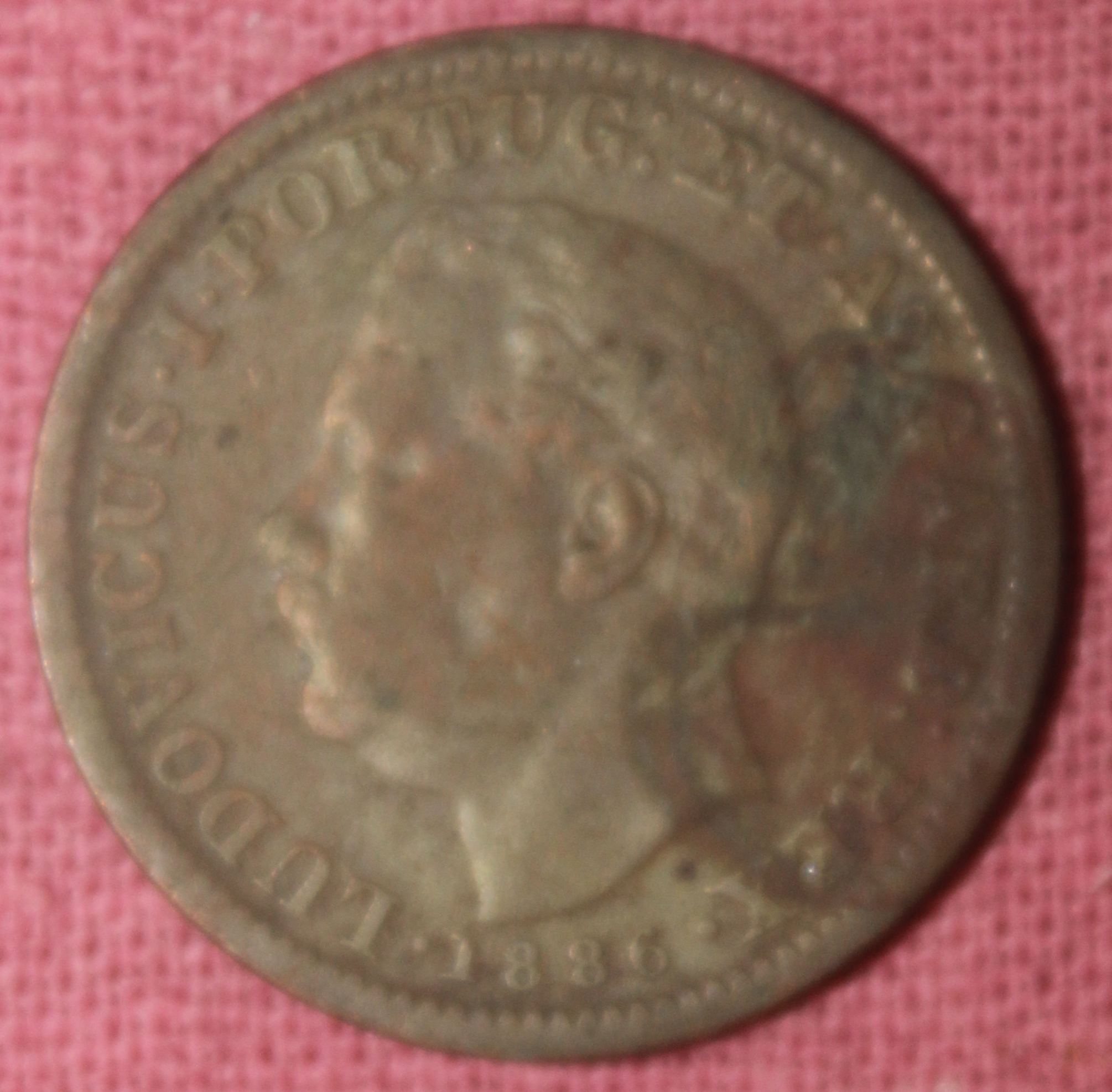

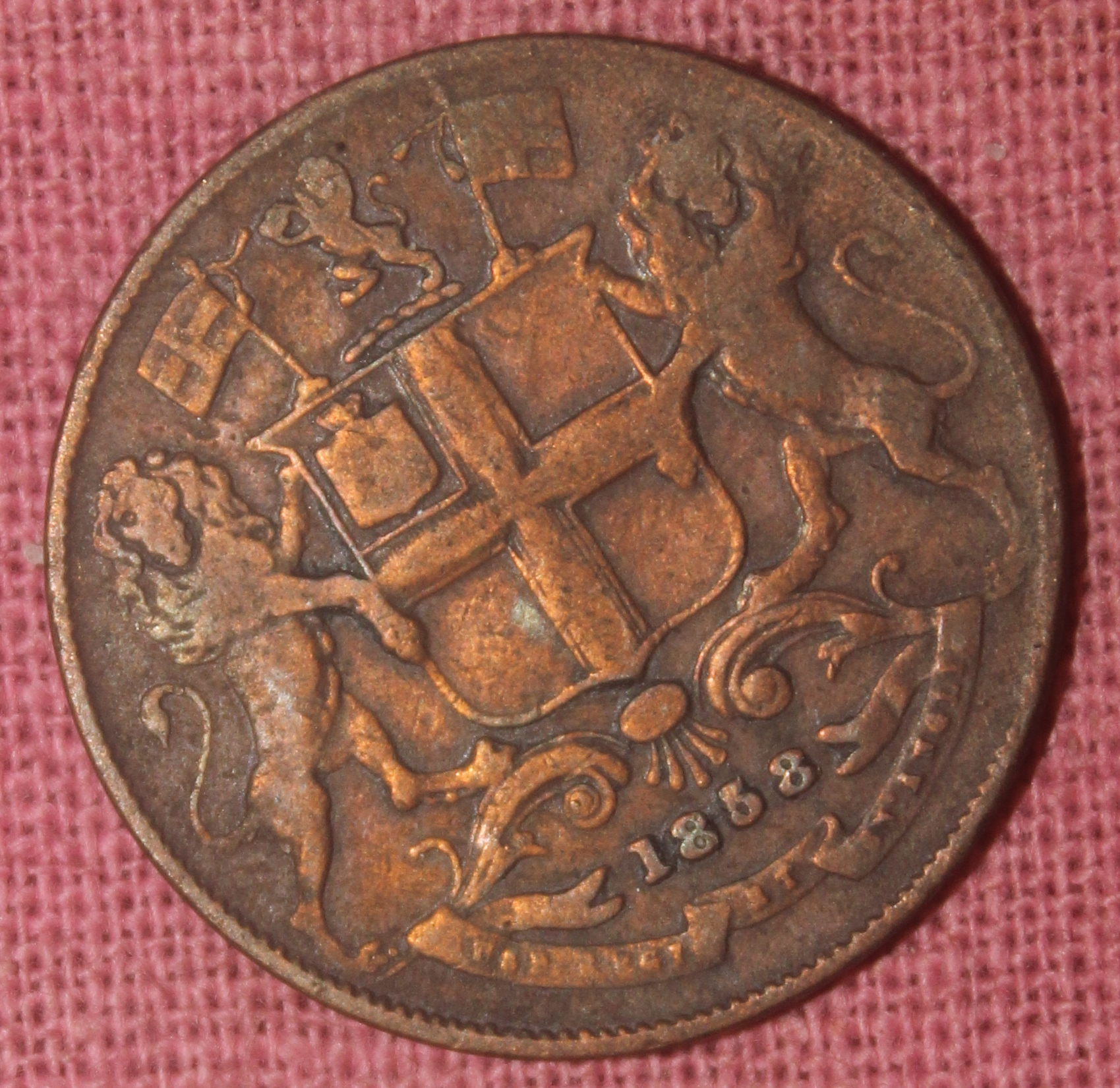

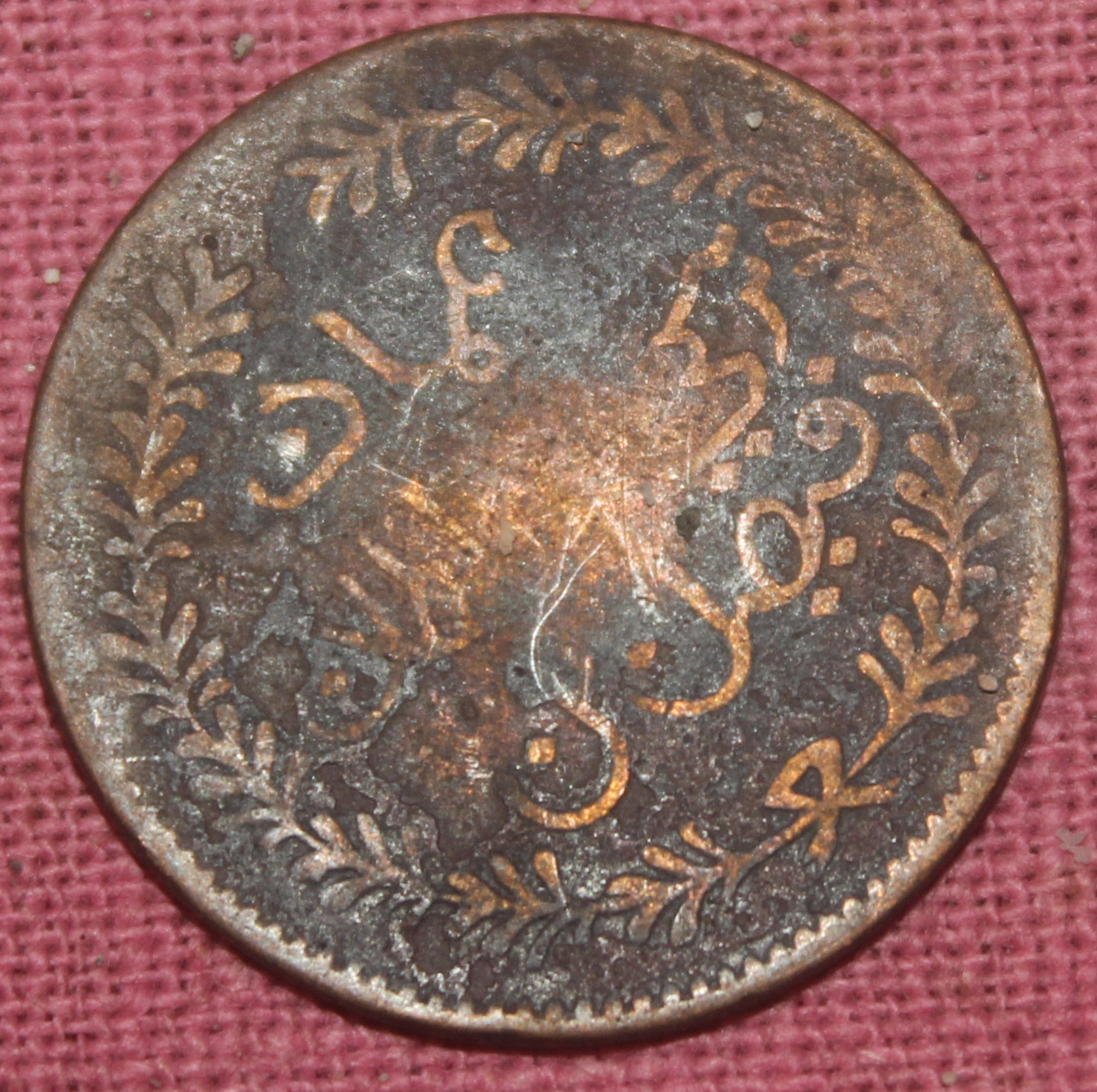

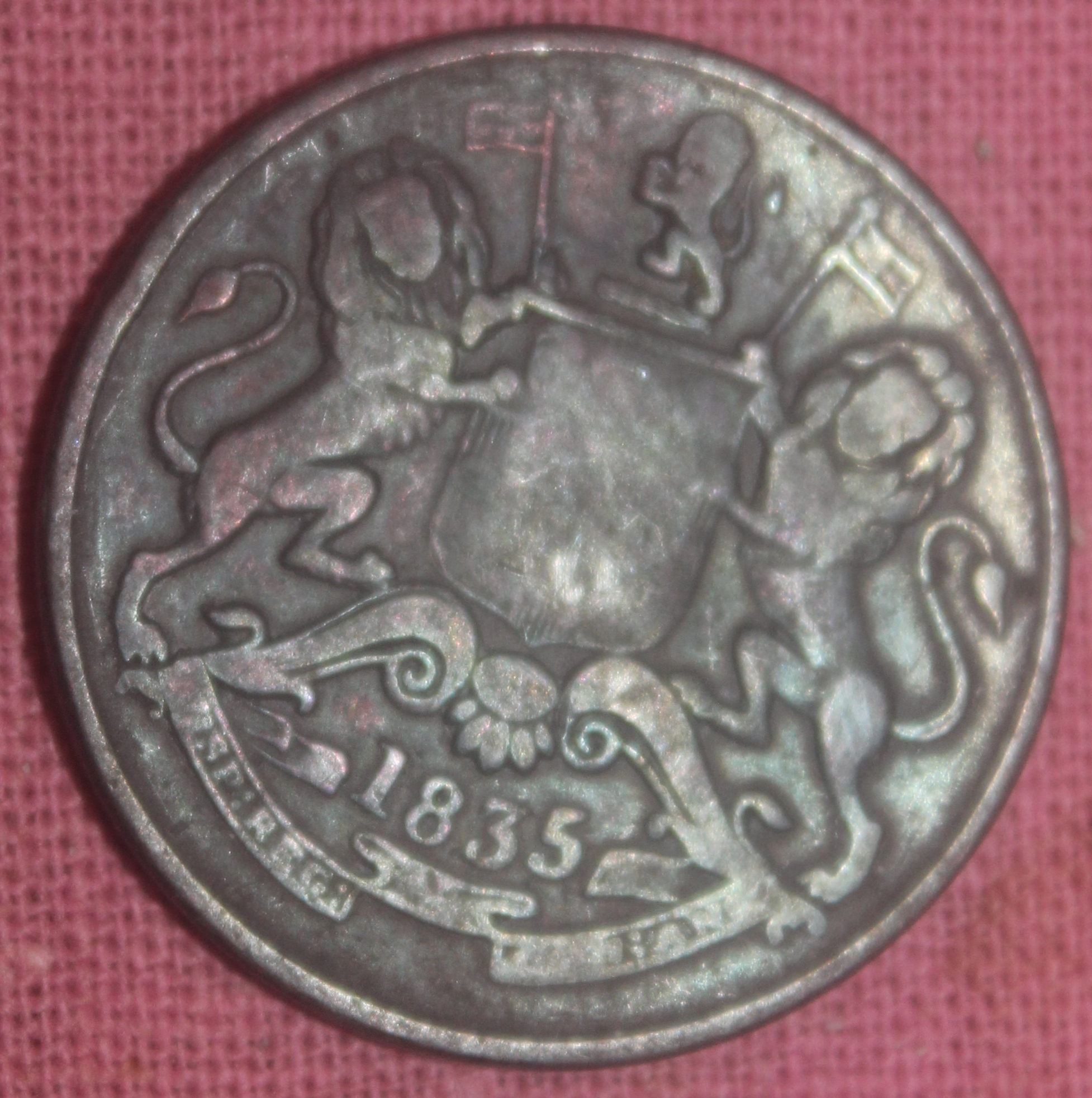

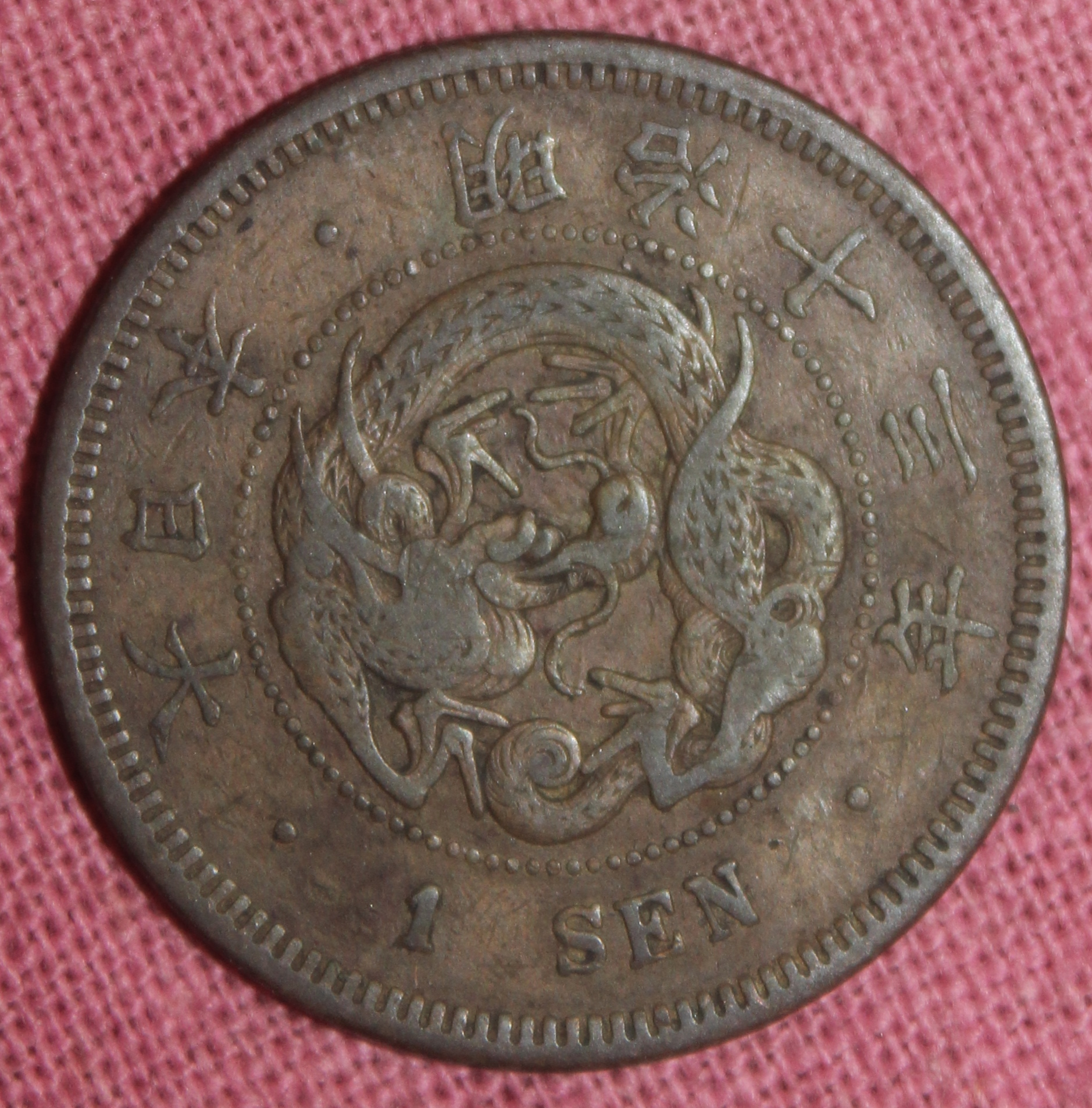

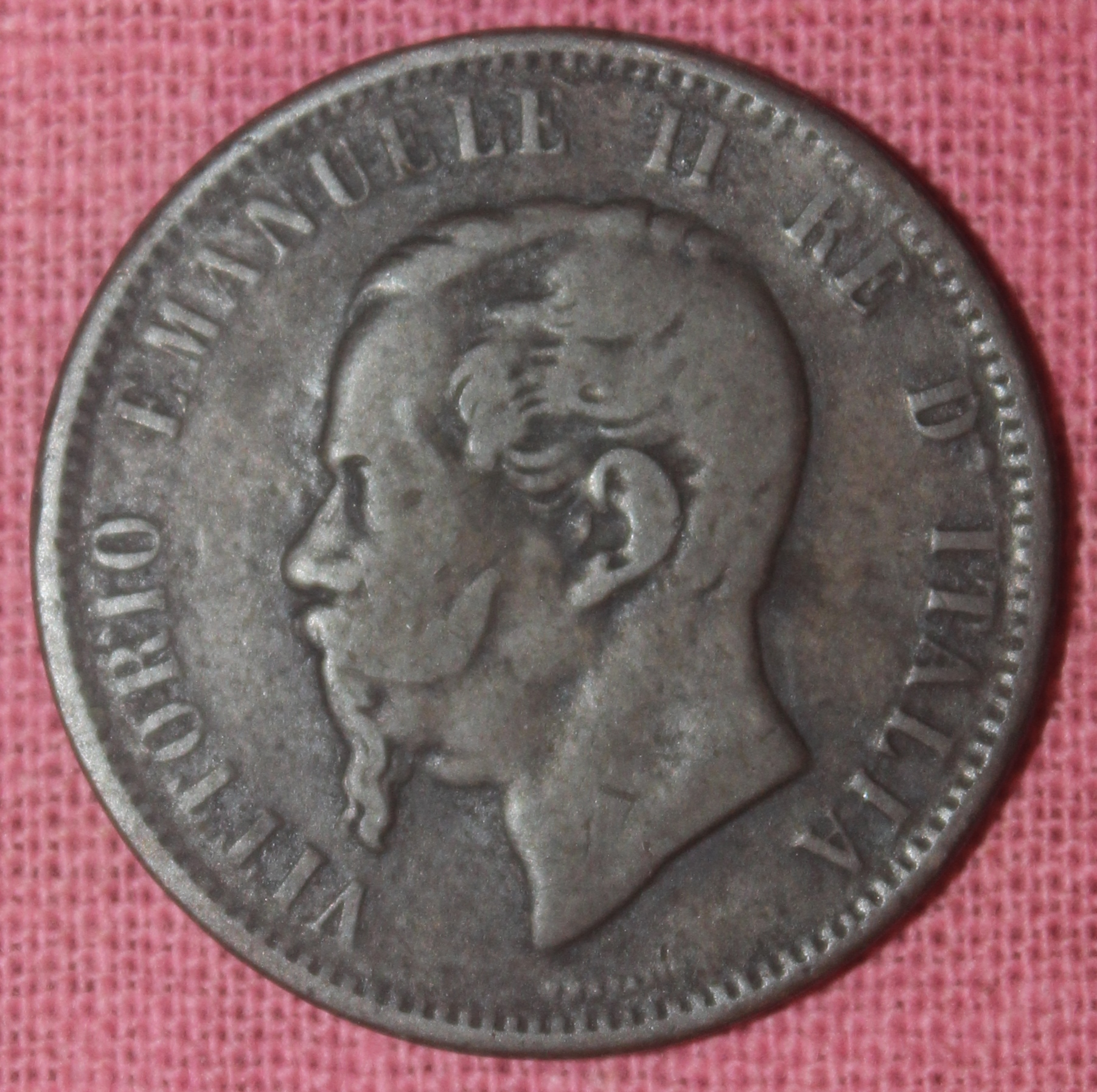

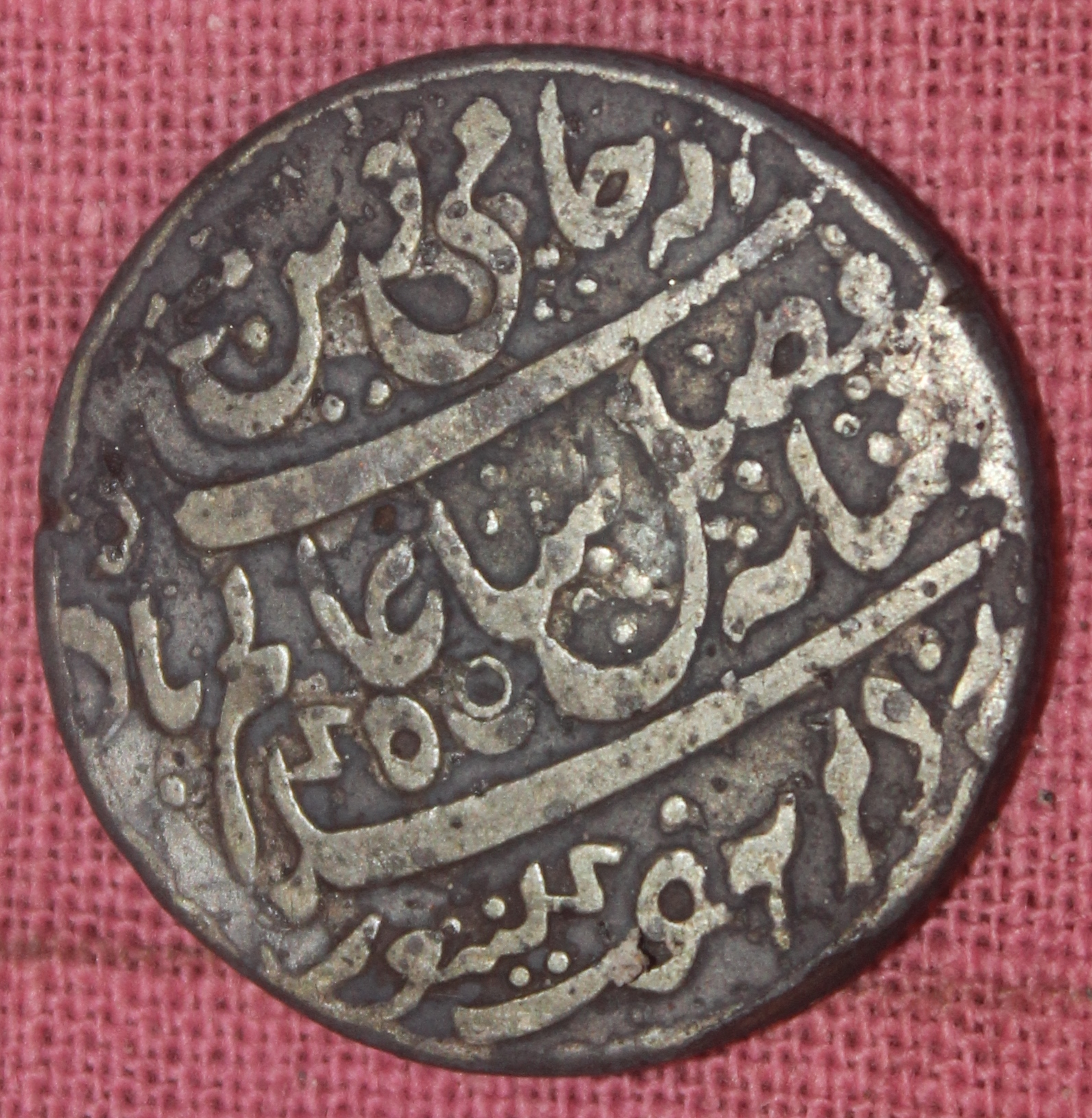

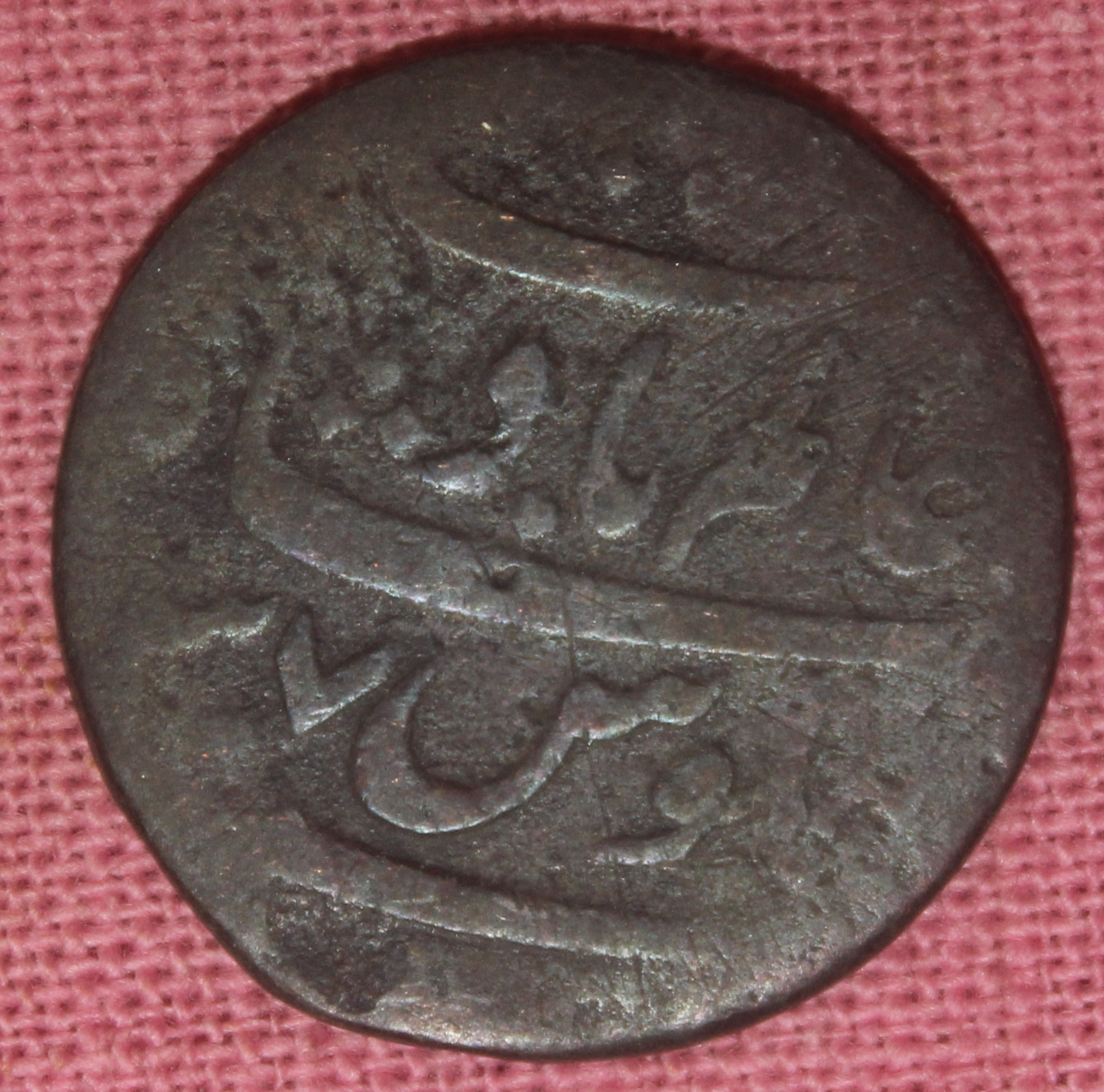
- Postage Stamps

To remember and commemorate Ghalib, postage stamps were issued not only in India but also in Pakistan as can be seen by the stamps exhibited

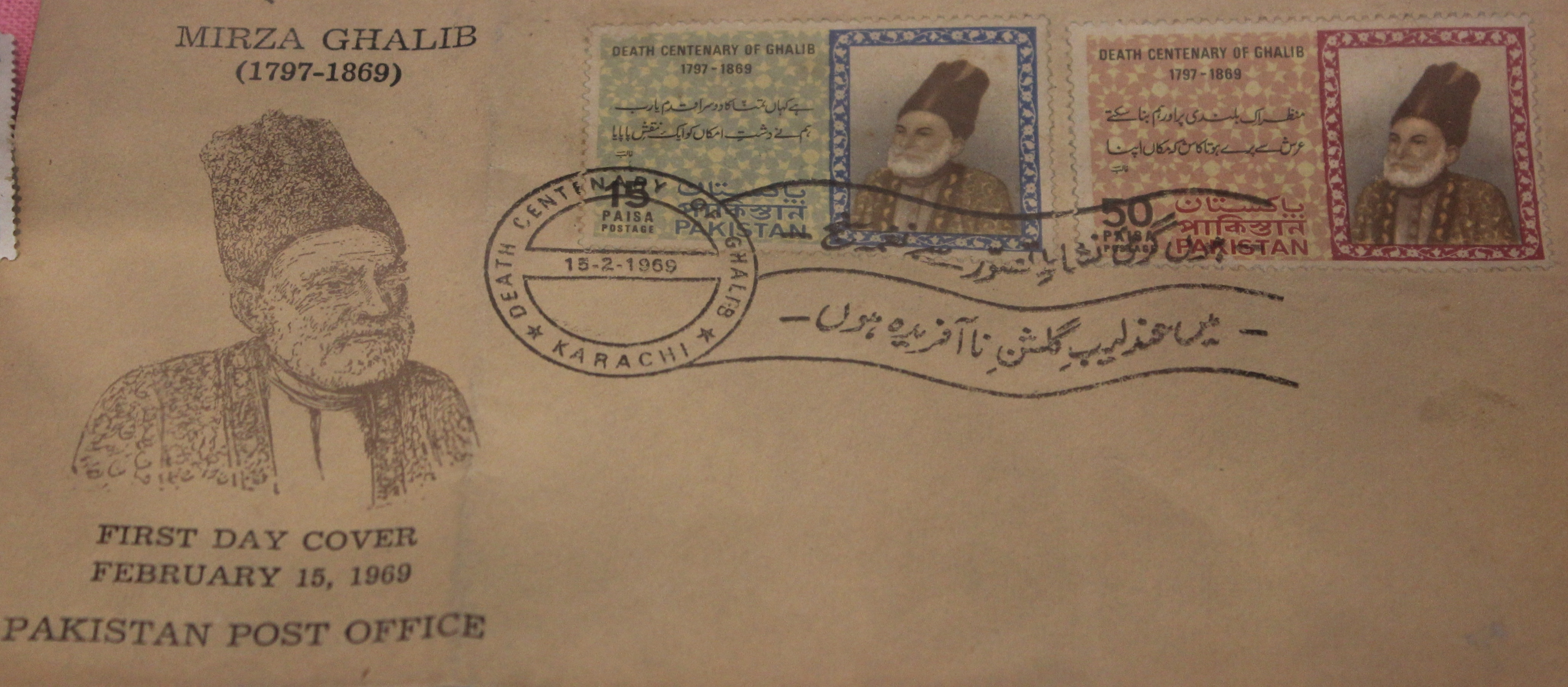

== See also ==
- Ghalib
- Ghalib Academy, Delhi
- Ghalib ki Haveli
