= Ghalib Academy =

Indian educational institute

Ghalib Academy, New Delhi
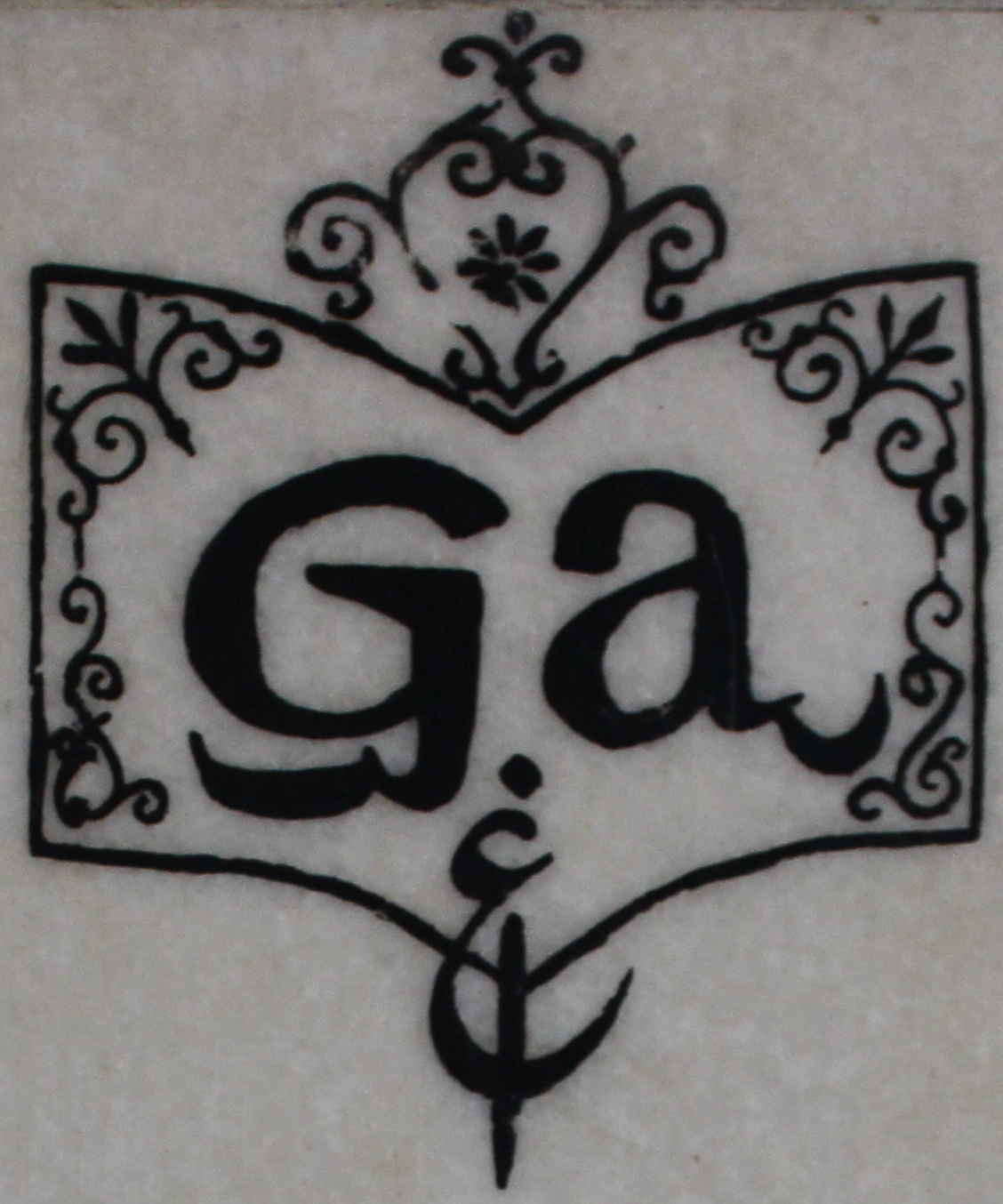
- The logo of Academy
- Formation: 22 February 1969; 57 years ago
- Type: Memorial
- Legal status: Registered Society
- Headquarters: Nizamuddin West, Delhi
- Location: Delhi
- Coordinates: 28.35°N 77.14°E
- Official language: Urdu
- Founder: Hakeem Abdul Hameed
- Main organ: Museum, Library, Auditorium, Publications
- Parent organization: Sonali Mahila Vikas Charitable Trust
- Affiliations: Registrar of Societies, Delhi
- Website: Official Website
- Remarks: To perpetuate the memory of Mirza Asadullah Khan Ghalib in India and abroad.

Ghalib Academy (Urdu: غالب اکادمی) is an educational and cultural institution of national importance in India. It was founded in 1969 by Hakeem Abdul Hameed and inaugurated by the former president of India Dr. Zakir Hussain in Nizamuddin West area, Delhi. The Academy has been established in the memory of the 19th century Urdu poet Mirza Ghalib. The Academy is situated in the vicinity of the tomb of the 13th-century Sufi saint Nizamuddin Auliya.

== About ==
The Academy consist of a museum in memory of the poet, a research library, an art gallery, an auditorium and a computerized calligraphy training centre in collaboration with the National Council for Promotion of Urdu Language . The Academy is visited by thousands of Indian as well foreign scholars, writers, poets and academicians. The academy claims to have a wide and rich collection of books that are not available anywhere else. The Academy today engages in the development and promotion of the Urdu Language. It organizes literary and cultural programs on famous Urdu Poets like Ghalib and Allama Iqbal, etc. to further the cause of Urdu Language. It also organizes seminars, workshops, exhibitions, and literary meets, etc. The mausoleum of Mirza Ghalib is just next to the Academy building. It lies in the attached courtyard of the building just on the way to the Dargah of Nizamuddin. The Humayun's Tomb is also at a walking distance from the museum.

== History ==
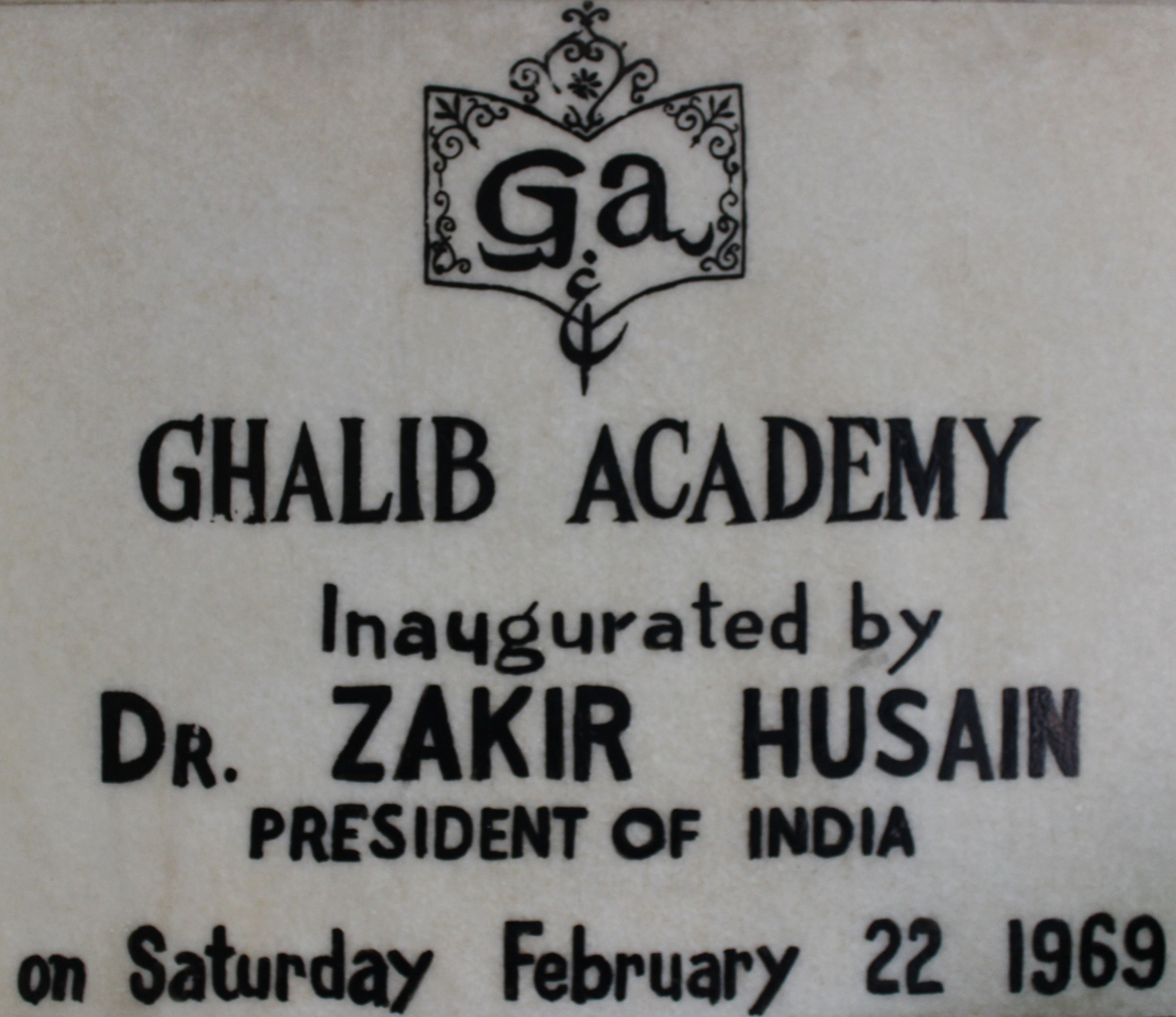
An inscription done in front of the Ghalib Academy building

In the middle of the twentieth century in order to keep alive the memory of the Indian poet Mirza Asadullah Khan Ghalib, Hakeem Abdul Hameed formed a society named Ghalib Academy which was later joined by many other influential people of the time. This society had its registered office at Hamdard Manzil Lal Kuan Delhi. The Society president Hakeem Abdul Hameed purchased two plots adjacent to Ghalib's Mazar (grave) in Nizamuddin Basti and got the Ghalib Academy building constructed there. It was formally declared open by the then President of India Dr Zakir Hussain on the occasion of the Ghalib Centenary on 22 February 1969.

== Aims and objectives ==
- To perpetuate the memory of Mirza Asadullah Khan Ghalib in India and abroad.
- To conduct research on Ghalib and his age.
- To arrange for the education of oriental languages for the study of Ghalib.
- To collaborate with Societies, Organization, or Institutions carrying on kindred activities.

== Subsidiary bodies ==
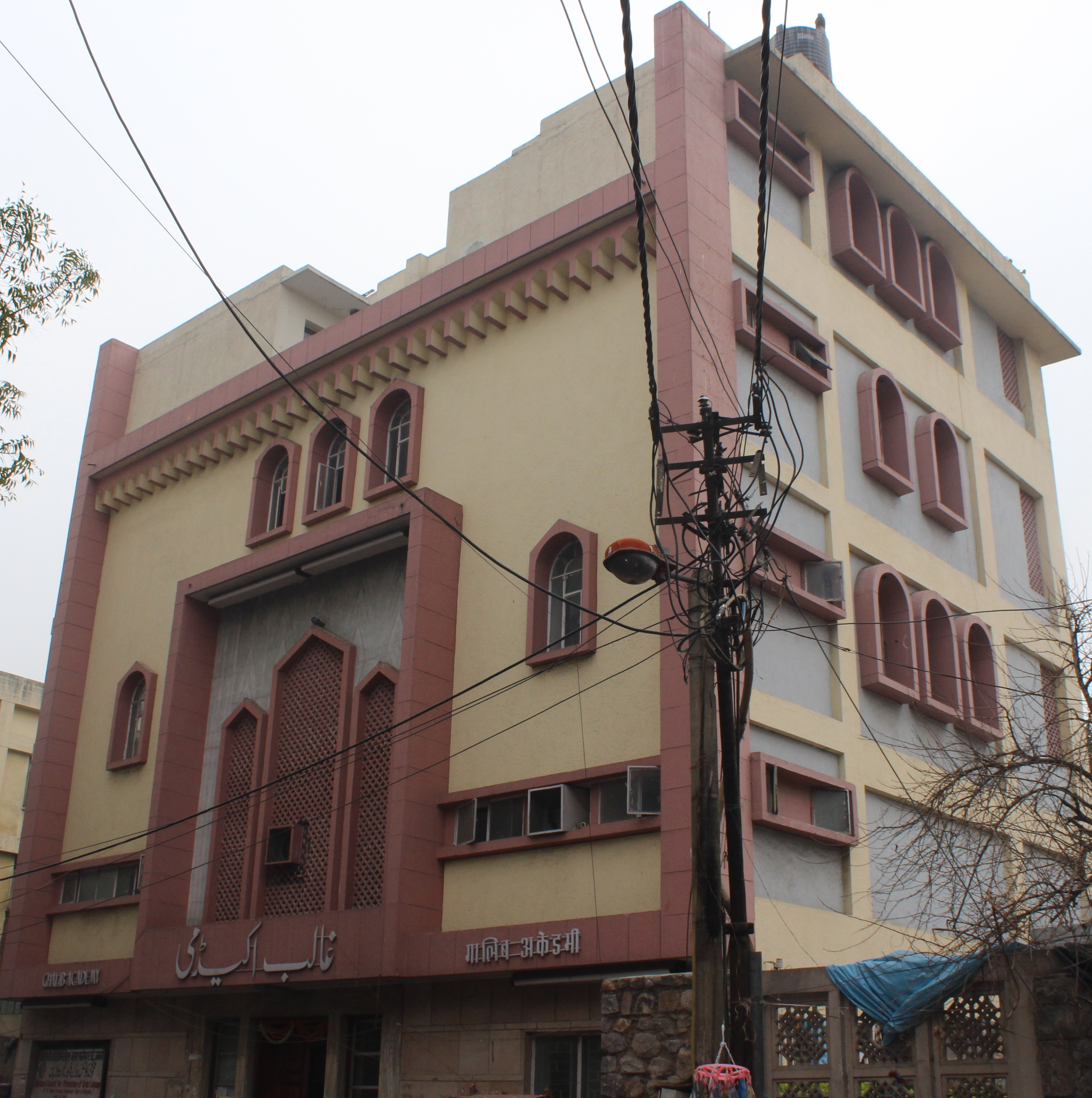
Building of Ghalib Academy

- Ghalib Memorial Museum
- Library – It has books covering topics that are not part of Ghalib's life but also covers other topics.
- Auditorium – The Ghalib Academy also organizes seminars, literary meets, exhibitions, stage shows, musical soirees, and documentary films to discuss the life of Ghalib
- Publications Section – The Academy has a publication section that oversees the publication of books on Ghalib and his contemporaries. Some of the much-appreciated books by the publication section are Ghalib Aur Chung -e- Ghalib, Ghalib aur Fan-e- Tanqeed(Ghalib and the Art of Satire), Ghalib Aur Zaka Momin Shakhsiat Aur fun, Talmihat-e- Ghalib.The Academy has brought out gorgeous editions of Dewan- e -Ghalib on art paper. It also publishes half-yearly literary Journal Jahan-e-Ghalib.
- Training Center – the academy runs a centre for learning Urdu language, Urdu typing, and computerized calligraphy. The Urdu language course is recognized by Delhi University.

== See also ==
- Ghalib
- Ghalib ki Haveli
