= Global Chess League =

Global Chess League may refer to the annual over-the-board rapid chess league organized by FIDE and Tech Mahindra. It's previously concluded editions are as follows:

- Global Chess League 2023, first edition held in Dubai. The winner of the inaugural Tech Mahindra Global Chess League (GCL) 2023 was the Triveni Continental Kings, who defeated the upGrad Mumba Masters in the final held in Dubai.
- Global Chess League 2024, second edition held in London. The winner of the Tech Mahindra Global Chess League (GCL) 2024 was the Triveni Continental Kings, who successfully defended their title by defeating the PBG Alaskan Knights in the final held in London.
- Global Chess League 2025, third edition held in Mumbai. The winner of the Tech Mahindra Global Chess League (GCL) 2025 was the Alpine SG Pipers, who defeated the Triveni Continental Kings in the final held in Mumbai.
- Global Chess League 2026, fourth edition held in Bengaluru. The winner of the Tech Mahindra Global Chess League (GCL) 2026 was the Ganges Grandmasters, who defeated the Alpine APL Pipers in the final held in Bengaluru.
