= Skimming (fraud) =

Financial crime

In law, skimming is a financial crime whereby a person takes cash from a transaction involving a third party, such as the daily receipts of a business, and officially reports a lower total to government authorities. The formal legal term is defalcation.

== Examples ==
A skimming crime may be simple tax evasion: the owner of a business may pocket a cash payment and deliberately fail to record the transaction, thus converting a customer's payment directly to the owner's personal use without accounting for the profit, and thereby avoid paying either business or personal income taxes on it. A famous example of this crime occurred at Studio 54 discotheque, which was forced to close as a result.

Skimming may additionally be the direct theft of cash; in addition to hiding it from tax authorities, the perpetrator hides the taking from an employer (embezzlement), business partners, or shareholders. In one large-scale case, an Indian court in Hyderabad convicted Satyam Computer Services founder B. Ramalinga Raju and nine other defendants of criminal conspiracy and fraud in 2015. The court found that forged documents, fake bank accounts and falsified accounts had been used in the scheme to defraud the company's shareholders.

Skimming may be necessitated by a third crime; for example, an otherwise honest businessman who pays taxes and does not cheat his partners might still be forced to skim some cash from the business and use it to give to an extortionist in the form of a bribe, kickbacks, or payment to a protection racket or loan shark or even a blackmailer.

Skimming at casinos is associated with the funding of organized crime. In May 1963, the FBI turned over to the Justice Department a two-volume document called The Skimming Report which detailed the skimming of gambling profits by Las Vegas casinos to avoid taxes. The report documented how pre-tax profits from casinos were being routed to various organized crime syndicates across the nation. No one could be prosecuted as the FBI obtained its information by illegally bugging casino money rooms. Casino skimming during the 1970s and 1980s is featured in Nicholas Pileggi's nonfiction book Casino: Love and Honor in Las Vegas and in the film Casino, which is based on it.

Other related usages can include things such as corrupt government officials "skimming" cash received as foreign aid.
