= Global Chess League 2025 =

Over-the-board rapid chess league

- Association: FIDE
- League: Global Chess League
- Sport: Chess
- Defending champions: Triveni Continental Kings (2024)
- Hosts: Mumbai
- Duration: December 14–23, 2025
- Teams: 6
- Season MVP: Alireza Firouzja (male); Hou Yifan (female)

Finals
- Champions: Alpine SG Pipers
- Runners-up: Triveni Continental Kings
- Final MVP: Anish Giri

Seasons
- 2024 2026

Global Chess League
- Most recent season or competition: 2025
- Sport: Chess
- Founded: 2023
- Founder: FIDE; Tech Mahindra; Michael Mkpadi
- First season: 2023
- No. of teams: 6
- Confederation: FIDE
- Most recent champion: Alpine SG Pipers (2025)
- Most titles: Triveni Continental Kings (2 titles)
- Broadcaster: Star Sports
- Streaming partners: JioHotstar, Chess.com
- Sponsor: Tech Mahindra
- Tournament format: Round-robin, Knockout
- Website: Official website

The Global Chess League 2025, known for sponsorship reasons as the Tech Mahindra Global Chess League 2025, was the third season of the annual over-the-board rapid chess league organized by FIDE. It was held in Mumbai from December 14 to 23, 2025. It was a joint venture organized by Tech Mahindra and FIDE.

It featured six teams of six players each, and involved ten round-robin matches, followed by a final match between the top two teams. Alpine SG Pipers, led by Fabiano Caruana won the event after defeating the defending champions Triveni Continental Kings, led by Alireza Firouzja in the final. Anish Giri was named Player of the Final for winning both his games in the final. Firouzja was named Male Player of the Season. Hou Yifan was named Female Player of the Season.

== Group stage ==
Rank	Team	MP	GP	Qualification
1	Triveni Continental Kings	24	102	Advance to Final match
2	Alpine SG Pipers	15	84	Advance to Final match
3	Ganges Grandmasters	15	83	Advance to Third place match
4	PBG Alaskan Knights	15	73	Advance to Third place match
5	upGrad Mumba Masters	12	92	
6	Fyers American Gambits	9	76	

== Final ==
=== Third place ===
Name	1	2	TB1	TB2	Total
Ganges Grandmasters	1	0	0	0	1
PBG Alaskan Knights	0	1	1	1	3

	Results	
Match 1
Ganges Grandmasters	4–2	PBG Alaskan Knights
Viswanathan Anand	1–0	Gukesh Dommaraju
Vincent Keymer	0–1	Arjun Erigaisi
Javokhir Sindarov	1–0	Leinier Domínguez
IM Polina Shuvalova	1–0	Kateryna Lagno
IM Stavroula Tsolakidou	0–1	IM Sarasadat Khademalsharieh
Raunak Sadhwani	1–0	Daniel Dardha
Match 2
PBG Alaskan Knights	3½–2½	Ganges Grandmasters
Gukesh Dommaraju	½–½	Viswanathan Anand
Arjun Erigaisi	1–0	Vincent Keymer
Leinier Domínguez	1–0	Javokhir Sindarov
Kateryna Lagno	0–1	IM Polina Shuvalova
IM Sarasadat Khademalsharieh	0–1	IM Stavroula Tsolakidou
Daniel Dardha	1–0	Raunak Sadhwani
Tiebreaker 1
Ganges Grandmasters	2½–3½	PBG Alaskan Knights
Viswanathan Anand	½–½	Gukesh Dommaraju
Vincent Keymer	0–1	Arjun Erigaisi
Javokhir Sindarov	1–0	Leinier Domínguez
IM Polina Shuvalova	0–1	Kateryna Lagno
IM Stavroula Tsolakidou	0–1	IM Sarasadat Khademalsharieh
Raunak Sadhwani	1–0	Daniel Dardha
Tiebreaker 2
PBG Alaskan Knights	4–2	Ganges Grandmasters
Gukesh Dommaraju	1–0	Viswanathan Anand
Arjun Erigaisi	0–1	Vincent Keymer
Leinier Domínguez	1–0	Javokhir Sindarov
Kateryna Lagno	1–0	IM Polina Shuvalova
IM Sarasadat Khademalsharieh	0–1	IM Stavroula Tsolakidou
Daniel Dardha	1–0	Raunak Sadhwani

=== Final ===
Name	1	2	Total
Triveni Continental Kings	0	0	0
Alpine SG Pipers	1	1	2

	Results	
Match 1
Triveni Continental Kings	2–4	Alpine SG Pipers
Alireza Firouzja	1–0	Fabiano Caruana
Wei Yi	0–1	Anish Giri
Vidit Gujrathi	½–½	R Praggnanandhaa
Zhu Jiner	½–½	Hou Yifan
Alexandra Kosteniuk	0–1	Nino Batsiashvili
Marc'Andria Maurizzi	0–1	Leon Luke Mendonca
Match 2
Alpine SG Pipers	4½–1½	Triveni Continental Kings
Fabiano Caruana	1–0	Alireza Firouzja
Anish Giri	1–0	Wei Yi
R Praggnanandhaa	1–0	Vidit Gujrathi
Hou Yifan	½–½	Zhu Jiner
Nino Batsiashvili	0–1	Alexandra Kosteniuk
Leon Luke Mendonca	1–0	Marc'Andria Maurizzi

== Franchises ==
Alpine SG Pipers
Board	Player	Rating	Results										
Board	Player	Rating	1	2	3	4	5	6	7	8	9	10	Score
1	(United States) Fabiano Caruana	2751	0	1	0	½	0	1	½	½	½	0	4
2	(Netherlands) Anish Giri	2685	0	½	½	½	0	1	0	½	½	0	3½
3	(India) R Praggnanandhaa	2663	½	0	½	½	0	1	0	½	½	½	4
4	(China) Hou Yifan	2536	½	0	1	½	0	0	1	1	1	1	6
5	(Georgia (country)) Nino Batsiashvili	2346	1	1	½	1	1	1	0	½	½	½	7
6	(India) Leon Luke Mendonca	2498	½	0	1	1	1	0	1	0	0	½	5

upGrad Mumba Masters
Board	Player	Rating	Results										
Board	Player	Rating	1	2	3	4	5	6	7	8	9	10	Score
1	(France) Maxime Vachier-Lagrave	2730	1	0	1	½	0	½	0	½	1	0	4½
2	(United States) Wesley So	2702	½	½	½	1	½	1	0	½	½	0	5
3	(Azerbaijan) Shakhriyar Mamedyarov	2707	1	1	½	½	½	1	0	½	0	1	6
4	(India) Koneru Humpy	2448	0	½	0	1	½	1	0	0	½	0	3½
5	(India) Harika Dronavalli	2435	1	½	½	1	½	0	0	½	0	½	4½
6	(Iran) Bardiya Daneshvar	2498	1	1	0	1	½	½	½	1	1	1	7½

Fyers American Gambits
Board	Player	Rating	Results										
Board	Player	Rating	1	2	3	4	5	6	7	8	9	10	Score
1	(United States) Hikaru Nakamura	2732	½	1	0	½	½	1	1	½	½	½	6
2	(FIDE) Vladislav Artemiev	2727	½	½	½	½	½	0	1	½	½	0	4½
3	(Hungary) Richárd Rapport	2702	½	0	1	½	0	½	1	½	½	½	5
4	(Kazakhstan) Bibisara Assaubayeva	2461	½	½	½	½	1	½	1	½	0	½	5½
5	(Serbia) IM Teodora Injac	2360	1	½	0	0	½	0	1	1	½	0	4½
6	(FIDE) Volodar Murzin	2642	½	0	1	0	½	½	½	0	1	0	4

PBG Alaskan Knights
			Results										
Board	Player	Rating	1	2	3	4	5	6	7	8	9	10	Score
1	(India) Gukesh Dommaraju	2692	½	0	0	½	1	0	1	½	0	1	4½
2	(India) Arjun Erigaisi	2714	½	½	½	0	1	1	0	1	½	1	6
3	(United States) Leinier Domínguez	2703	½	½	0	½	1	½	0	½	1	½	5
4	(FIDE) Kateryna Lagno	2360	½	0	0	0	1	½	1	0	½	0	3½
5	(Spain) IM Sarasadat Khademalsharieh	2356	0	½	½	0	0	1	0	1	1	½	4½
6	(Belgium) Daniel Dardha	2592	½	0	½	0	0	½	½	½	0	½	3

Ganges Grandmasters
Board	Player	Rating	Results										
Board	Player	Rating	1	2	3	4	5	6	7	8	9	10	Score
1	(India) Viswanathan Anand	2727	0	0	1	0	½	½	½	½	0	½	3½
2	(Germany) Vincent Keymer	2640	½	½	½	0	½	0	1	0	½	1	4½
3	(Uzbekistan) Javokhir Sindarov	2704	0	1	1	1	1	0	1	½	1	½	7
4	(FIDE) IM Polina Shuvalova	2452	1	1	1	½	0	0	0	1	0	½	5
5	(Greece) IM Stavroula Tsolakidou	2358	0	0	½	0	½	1	1	0	0	1	4
6	(India) Raunak Sadhwani	2611	0	1	½	½	½	½	0	½	½	1	5

Triveni Continental Kings
Board	Player	Rating	Results										
Board	Player	Rating	1	2	3	4	5	6	7	8	9	10	Score
1	(France) Alireza Firouzja	2754	1	1	1	1	1	0	0	½	1	1	7½
2	(China) Wei Yi	2751	1	½	½	1	½	0	1	½	½	1	6½
3	(India) Vidit Gujrathi	2650	½	½	0	0	½	0	1	½	0	0	3
4	(China) Zhu Jiner	2435	½	1	½	½	½	1	0	½	1	1	6½
5	(Switzerland) Alexandra Kosteniuk	2450	0	½	1	1	½	0	1	0	1	½	5½
6	(France) Marc'Andria Maurizzi	2506	½	1	0	½	½	1	½	1	½	0	5½
