= T. N. Manoharan =

Indian chartered accountant (1956–2025)

- Born: 7 April 1956; Gudiyatham, Tamil Nadu, India
- Died: 30 July 2025 (aged 69); Mumbai, Maharashtra, India
- Education: University of Madras; Sri Venkateswara University; The Institute of Chartered Accountants of India
- Occupations: Practicing Chartered Accountant; Former non-executive chairman of Canara Bank (2015-20)
- Notable credits: Padma Shri Awardee (2010); Former president of ICAI (2006-07)
- Title: Padma Shri; Chartered Accountant
- Parents: T. L. Narayanaswamy Chowdhry (father); T. N. Sarada Narayanaswamy (mother)

T. Narayanasamy Manoharan (7 April 1956 – 30 July 2025) was an Indian practicing chartered accountant who was president of the Institute of Chartered Accountants of India (2006–07) and chairman of Canara Bank (2015–20). Manoharan was appointed by the central government to the Board of Satyam Computer Services as part of the revival team, with the responsibility of safeguarding stakeholders' interests and overseeing the resolution of the company’s affairs following the Satyam scandal—a major corporate fraud that severely impacted its operations.

== Background ==
T. N. Manoharan hailed from Rajakoil village near Gudiyatham, born to an independence activist and agriculturist T.L.Narayanasamy Chowdhry and Saradammal. He was a postgraduate in commerce from Sri Venkateswara University and a Chartered Accountant of four decades of standing. He was also a law graduate from Madras Law College.

Manoharan died from a suspected cardiac arrest in his sleep, in Mumbai, on 30 July 2025. He was 69. At the time of his demise, he was Regional Grand Master of Southern India under the Grand Lodge of India.

== Career ==
Manoharan authored books for professionals and students on Taxation. Besides carrying on his practice as a CA, he was teaching CA students with passion for about two decades in Chennai and various places in Southern India. He supported students from poor strata of society by offering free admission and distribution of their text books. A few thousand of his students are settled in India and abroad. Manoharan was a visiting faculty in BIM in Trichy, RBI Staff Training college and SIRC of ICAI, ICMA and ICSI in Chennai during the 1990s.

He addressed training programmes at Nagpur Academy on Direct Taxes for IRS officers and for Income tax Appellate Tribunal Members at the Judicial Academy, Mumbai. He presented several hundred papers in conference and seminars and addressed renowned institutions both in India and abroad including reputable foreign universities such as Chicago University in the USA, Warwick University in the UK and Southern Queensland University in Australia.

He served as a council member of the Institute of Chartered Accountants of India for 6 years from 2001 and became its National President during the year 2006-07. He was a special director of the Government-nominated Board for revival of Satyam Computer Services Limited. He wrote his experience as a book titled Tech Phoenix – Satyam's 100-day Turnaround.

Manoharan served as chairman of the committee on Accounting Standards and Taxation of the Confederation of Indian Industry (CII) during 2009–2011. He was member of the various committees constituted by CVC, RBI, C&AG, CBDT and SEBI. He was on the board of the Insurance Regulatory and Development Authority (IRDA). He was a member of the advisory council for the skill development in the BFSI Sector. He served as a non-executive chairman of Canara Bank for five years up to August 2020 and as the administrator of Lakshmi Vilas Bank during 2020 till its merger with DBS Bank.

He was a member of the Reserve Bank of India Standing External Advisory Committee (SEAC) for evaluating applications for Universal Banks and Small Finance Banks. He served as independent director of IDBI Bank, Mahindra & Mahindra, Tech Mahindra and National Bank for Financing Infrastructure and Development (NaBFID) at various points in time.

He was initiated into the masonic movement in lodge accountants no. 194 on 27 October 1994. He was adjudged the Best Master in the Region in 2005 in craft; Best Zerubbabel in the Region in 2013 in Chapter and Best Mark Master in the Region in 2016. He also won the best Installing officer awards in Chapter and Mark. In Craft, he was the Grand Chaplain during 2018–2019 and Assistant Grand Master during 2020–2021; In Grand Chapter, he was the Third Grand Principal during 2021-22. He was conferred the Outstanding Mason award from GLI for the year 2019 at Grand Festival held on 30 November 2019 in Trichy. At the Grand Festival in Kolkata on 26 November 2022, his appointment as The Regional Grand Master of Southern India for the ensuing term of 3 years was announced. He was conferred with the Grand Master's Order of Service to Masonry (OSM) at the Half Yearly Meeting (HYM) of the Regional Grand Lodge of Southern India (RGLSI) held on September 21st, 2024 at Big Bee Banquet Halls, Marcela, Ponda, Goa. Usually conferred after completion of RGMship, R. W. Bro. T. N. Manoharan had the distinct honor of being conferred OSM when he was one and a half years into his RGMship.

Manoharan was presented with the "Lifetime achievement" award in 2005, the "For the Sake of Honour" award in 2007, the Dronacharya award in 2022 by the Rotary, the “Super Achiever Award” in 2006 by the Lions International. He received the "Business Leadership award" from the Finance Minister of India under the aegis of NDTV-Profit as part of the Satyam revival team in October 2009 and the CNN IBN "Indian of the Year 2009" award from the Prime Minister of India in December 2009. He was conferred the civilian honour "Padma Shri" award by the President of India on 7 April 2010.
