= Global Chess League 2026 =

Over-the-board rapid chess league

- Association: FIDE
- League: Global Chess League
- Sport: Chess
- Defending champions: Alpine SG Pipers (2025)
- Hosts: Bengaluru
- Duration: 5–13 September 2026
- Teams: 6
- Season MVP: Stavroula Tsolakidou

Finals
- Champions: Ganges Grandmasters
- Runners-up: Alpine APL Pipers
- Final MVP: Ian Nepomniachtchi

Seasons
- 2025

Global Chess League
- Most recent season or competition: 2026
- Sport: Chess
- Founded: 2023
- Founder: FIDE; Tech Mahindra; Michael Mkpadi
- First season: 2023
- No. of teams: 6
- Confederation: FIDE
- Most recent champion: Ganges Grandmasters (2026)
- Most titles: Triveni Continental Kings (2 titles)
- Sponsor: Tech Mahindra
- Tournament format: Round-robin, Knockout
- Website: Official website

The 2026 Global Chess League, known for sponsorship reasons as the Tech Mahindra Global Chess League 2026, was the fourth season of the annual over-the-board rapid chess league organized by FIDE. The tournament took place from 5 to 13 September 2026 at The Lalit Ashok in Bengaluru, India.

It featured six teams of six players each, and involved ten round-robin matches, followed by a final match between the top two teams. Ganges Grandmasters, led by Ian Nepomniachtchi won the event after defeating the defending champions Alpine APL Pipers, led by Magnus Carlsen in the final.

== Background and venue ==
Following past iterations held in Dubai (2023), London (2024), and Mumbai (2025), the event was hosted in Bengaluru. The official player draft was conducted in Mumbai on 29 June 2026, establishing six-player rosters across the six participating franchises. The total prize fund for the tournament remained at US$1,000,000.

== Regulations and scoring ==
The tournament employed a mixed-gender format in which matches were contested across six fixed boards concurrently.

=== Squad structure ===
Each team featured six players designated by specific category requirements:

- Board 1: Icon Player
- Boards 2 & 3: Superstar Men
- Boards 4 & 5: Superstar Women
- Board 6: Prodigy (players born in 2005 or later)

=== Time control ===
Games were played under a rapid time control of 20 minutes per player for all moves, with an increment of 2 seconds per move starting only from move 41.

=== Scoring system ===
Individual matches used an asymmetrical point system to reward victories achieved with the black pieces:

- Game Points (GP):
  - Win with the black pieces: 4 points
  - Win with the white pieces: 3 points
  - Draw: 1 point
  - Loss: 0 points
- Match Points (MP):
  - Match victory (higher aggregate GP): 3 points
  - Match draw (equal aggregate GP): 1 point
  - Match defeat: 0 points

=== Competition structure ===
The event began with a double round-robin tournament of 10 rounds, where every franchise faced each opponent twice—once playing White across all boards and once playing Black. The two franchises that finished with the highest number of match points (with game points serving as the primary tiebreaker) advanced to a two-match final on 13 September 2026.

== Group stage ==
=== Standings ===
Pos	Team	Pld	W	D	L	MP	GP	Qualification
1	Ganges Grandmasters	10	6	0	4	18	95	Advance to Final match
2	Alpine APL Pipers	10	6	0	4	18	88	Advance to Final match
3	FYERS American Gambits	10	5	0	5	15	86	Advance to Third place match
4	CheQ Mumba Masters	10	5	0	5	15	85	Advance to Third place match
5	Triveni Continental Kings	10	4	0	6	12	81	
6	PBG Alaskan Knights	10	4	0	6	12	80	

Final Standings.

== Final ==
The championship was scheduled to be decided in a two-match series on 13 September 2026 between the top two teams from the round-robin stage.

=== Third place ===
Name	1	2	Total
CheQ Mumba Masters	0	0	0
FYERS American Gambits	1	1	2

	Results	
Match 1
CheQ Mumba Masters	2½–3½	FYERS American Gambits
Maxime Vachier-Lagrave	½–½	Javokhir Sindarov
Pranesh M	0–1	Nihal Sarin
Shakhriyar Mamedyarov	½–½	Daniil Dubov
Harika Dronavalli	1–0	Bibisara Assaubayeva
Carissa Yip	½–½	Sarasadat Khademalsharieh
Bardiya Daneshvar	0–1	Marc'Andria Maurizzi
Match 2
FYERS American Gambits	4–2	CheQ Mumba Masters
Javokhir Sindarov	½–½	Maxime Vachier-Lagrave
Nihal Sarin	1–0	Pranesh M
Daniil Dubov	½–½	Shakhriyar Mamedyarov
Bibisara Assaubayeva	½–½	Harika Dronavalli
Sarasadat Khademalsharieh	½–½	Carissa Yip
Marc'Andria Maurizzi	1–0	Bardiya Daneshvar

=== Final ===
Name	1	2	Total
Ganges Grandmasters	½	1	1½
Alpine APL Pipers	½	0	½

	Results	
Match 1
Ganges Grandmasters	3–3	Alpine APL Pipers
Ian Nepomniachtchi	½–½	Magnus Carlsen
Levon Aronian	1–0	Anish Giri
Leinier Domínguez	½–½	Vidit Gujrathi
Polina Shuvalova	½–½	Divya Deshmukh
Stavroula Tsolakidou	½–½	Koneru Humpy
Leon Luke Mendonca	0–1	Volodar Murzin
Match 2
Alpine APL Pipers	2–4	Ganges Grandmasters
Magnus Carlsen	0–1	Ian Nepomniachtchi
Anish Giri	½–½	Levon Aronian
Vidit Gujrathi	½–½	Leinier Domínguez
Divya Deshmukh	½–½	Polina Shuvalova
Koneru Humpy	0–1	Stavroula Tsolakidou
Volodar Murzin	½–½	Leon Luke Mendonca

== Franchises and rosters ==
The squads for the 2026 edition comprised thirty-six players representing twelve national federations:

Franchise	Icon Board	Superstar Men	Superstar Women	Prodigy Board	Coach
Alpine APL Pipers	(Norway) Magnus Carlsen	(Netherlands) Anish Giri (India) Vidit Gujrathi	(India) Divya Deshmukh (India) Koneru Humpy	(FIDE) Volodar Murzin	(India) Pravin Thipsay
Triveni Continental Kings	(France) Alireza Firouzja	(China) Wei Yi (India) Aravindh Chithambaram	(China) Zhu Jiner (Switzerland) Alexandra Kosteniuk	(India) Pranav V	(Netherlands) Loek van Wely
FYERS American Gambits	(Uzbekistan) Javokhir Sindarov	(FIDE) Daniil Dubov (India) Nihal Sarin	(Kazakhstan) Bibisara Assaubayeva (Spain) Sarasadat Khademalsharieh	(France) Marc'Andria Maurizzi	(India) Srinath Narayanan
Ganges Grandmasters	(FIDE) Ian Nepomniachtchi	(United States) Levon Aronian (United States) Leinier Domínguez	(FIDE) Polina Shuvalova (Greece) Stavroula Tsolakidou	(India) Leon Luke Mendonca	(India) Baskaran Adhiban
PBG Alaskan Knights	(India) Viswanathan Anand	(India) Arjun Erigaisi (Turkey) Yağız Kaan Erdoğmuş	(FIDE) Kateryna Lagno (Georgia (country)) Nino Batsiashvili	(United States) Abhimanyu Mishra	(India) Swayams Mishra
CheQ Mumba Masters	(France) Maxime Vachier-Lagrave	(Azerbaijan) Shakhriyar Mamedyarov (Slovenia) Vladimir Fedoseev	(United States) Carissa Yip (India) Harika Dronavalli	(Iran) Bardiya Daneshvar	(India) Pentala Harikrishna

Alpine APL Pipers
Board	Player	Rating	Results										
Board	Player	Rating	1	2	3	4	5	6	7	8	9	10	Score
1	(Norway) Magnus Carlsen	2803	½	½	1	½	½	1	½	1	1	0	6.5
2	(Netherlands) Anish Giri	2659	0	½	½	½	½	1	0	½	½	½	4.5
3	(India) Vidit Gujrathi	2624	1	1	0	1	0	½	½	0	1	0	5
4	(India) Divya Deshmukh	2419	0	0	½	½	½	0	½	½	0	½	3
5	(India) Koneru Humpy	2436	1	1	0	1	½	½	0	1	½	½	6
6	(FIDE) Volodar Murzin	2620	½	½	½	1	0	1	½	1	½	1	6.5

CheQ Mumba Masters
Board	Player	Rating	Results										
Board	Player	Rating	1	2	3	4	5	6	7	8	9	10	Score
1	(France) Maxime Vachier-Lagrave	2706	½	½	1	½	½	0	1	1	0	0	5
2	(India) Pranesh M	2534	1	0	½	1	0	0	½	½	0	1	4.5
3	(Azerbaijan) Shakhriyar Mamedyarov	2694	0	1	1	½	1	½	½	1	0	½	6
4	(India) Harika Dronavalli	2415	1	½	1	½	½	1	½	½	½	½	6.5
5	(United States) IM Carissa Yip	2356	0	0	0	1	1	½	0	0	0	1	3.5
6	(Iran) Bardiya Daneshvar	2546	½	0	0	1	½	0	0	1	0	1	4

FYERS American Gambits
Board	Player	Rating	Results										
Board	Player	Rating	1	2	3	4	5	6	7	8	9	10	Score
1	(Uzbekistan) Javokhir Sindarov	2730	1	½	0	½	½	1	1	1	0	1	6.5
2	(India) Nihal Sarin	2698	½	1	1	½	1	1	½	0	½	0	6
3	(FIDE) Daniil Dubov	2685	½	1	½	0	0	0	½	1	0	½	4
4	(Kazakhstan) Bibisara Assaubayeva	2444	½	½	0	½	½	0	½	1	1	½	5
5	(Spain) IM Sarasadat Khademalsharieh	2366	½	0	½	0	0	0	½	½	½	0	2.5
6	(France) Marc'Andria Maurizzi	2568	1	1	½	0	½	1	½	1	½	0	6

PBG Alaskan Knights
			Results										
Board	Player	Rating	1	2	3	4	5	6	7	8	9	10	Score
1	(India) Viswanathan Anand	2721	0	½	0	½	0	0	0	0	½	½	2
2	(India) Arjun Erigaisi	2745	½	1	½	0	1	0	½	½	1	½	5.5
3	(Turkey) Yağız Kaan Erdoğmuş	2492	½	0	1	0	0	1	½	1	1	1	6
4	(FIDE) Kateryna Lagno	2421	½	½	½	1	0	1	½	½	0	½	5
5	(Georgia (country)) Nino Batsiashvili	2407	½	1	1	0	1	1	1	0	0	0	5.5
6	(United States) Abhimanyu Mishra	2598	0	1	½	½	0	0	1	0	0	1	4

Ganges Grandmasters
Board	Player	Rating	Results										
Board	Player	Rating	1	2	3	4	5	6	7	8	9	10	Score
1	(FIDE) Ian Nepomniachtchi	2729	½	½	1	½	1	½	½	0	1	½	6
2	(United States) Levon Aronian	2750	1	½	0	0	0	½	1	1	1	½	5.5
3	(United States) Leinier Domínguez	2655	0	0	½	½	1	½	½	0	1	0	4
4	(FIDE) IM Polina Shuvalova	2398	1	1	1	½	1	1	½	0	½	½	7
5	(Greece) IM Stavroula Tsolakidou	2355	1	0	½	0	0	1	1	½	1	1	6
6	(India) Leon Luke Mendonca	2551	0	½	½	0	1	1	½	0	1	0	4.5

Triveni Continental Kings
Board	Player	Rating	Results										
Board	Player	Rating	1	2	3	4	5	6	7	8	9	10	Score
1	(France) Alireza Firouzja	2749	½	½	0	½	½	½	0	0	½	1	4
2	(China) Wei Yi	2726	0	0	½	1	½	½	½	½	0	½	4
3	(India) Aravindh Chithambaram	2604	1	0	0	1	1	½	½	0	0	1	5
4	(China) Zhu Jiner	2470	0	½	0	0	½	0	½	½	1	½	3.5
5	(Switzerland) Alexandra Kosteniuk	2421	0	1	1	1	½	0	½	1	1	½	6.5
6	(India) Pranav V	2594	1	0	1	½	1	0	½	0	1	0	5
