= Rusi Brij =

Indian businessman

- Born: 17 November 1955; India
- Died: 20 May 2009 (aged 53)
- Citizenship: Indian
- Known for: Vice-chairman of Hexaware Technologies

Rusi Brij (17 November 1955 – 20 May 2009) was an Indian business executive and entrepreneur. He was executive director of Satyam Computers, and CEO and vice-chairman of Hexaware Technologies. In 2003, he was named by Bain & Co. as one of India's hottest dealmakers in software. Rusi was well known and respected for his amicable mannerism, mentoring skills, people-oriented approach and a fine collection of vintage wines.

== Career ==
Rusi began his career with Living Media Limited, the leading magazine publishing house in India, where he was instrumental in setting up the first Market Research Unit in the publishing industry. He was the product manager for India Today, and also conceptualized and launched the Computers Today magazine. He entered the IT industry in 1986 when he joined Sonata Software, Bangalore.

He had over 25 years of varied experience in diverse portfolios ranging from M & A, International Business Development, Sales & Marketing, Project Management and Corporate Planning. His experience also included a long tenure with Satyam Computer Services Ltd. culminating in his appointment to executive director and EVP. He was widely known as a marketing-whiz at Satyam, where he once turned a $2 million deal into $20 million, the biggest deal of its kind in the Indian software industry at the time. He was instrumental in acquiring some of their largest customers, setting up many of their international operations, and also serving as chairman on several of their joint ventures, with Fortune 500 firms such as GE, IBM and the Sparkassen-Finanzgruppe.

He left Satyam in 2001 to join beleaguered Mumbai, India based Hexaware Technologies. The merger of Aptech Inc., a software training firm with Hexaware, a software development firm, had been slammed by Indian analysts. Morgan Stanley, while calling the venture "undoubtedly attractive", noted the uncertainty and volatility in the stock price as a major reason to be cautious. Prior to his joining Hexaware, the merger announcement had sent the stock tumbling from Rs. 450 per share to Rs. 90. 5 out of the 6 subsidiaries of the company were making a loss, and revenues seemed stalled at $52 million. By 2007, revenues had crossed $250 million, with year-on-year growth consistently over 35%.

While at Hexaware, he guided the company into key markets including PeopleSoft, Travel & Transportation, and Financial Services. He principally focused on business strategy, M&A, leadership development, and investor relations. In 2004, he was elevated to vice-chairman of the board. Under his tenure, Hexaware grew from a small BPO outfit to one of the top 20 software companies in India. It was also ranked as the fastest growing mid-size company in India. By 2005, the company was listed at number 11 on NASSCOM's Top 20 Indian software firms.

In 2005, Hexaware faced problems after PeopleSoft, a key client, was acquired by Oracle. Hexaware was amongst the top five vendors of PeopleSoft and had set up operations under a Build-Operate-Transfer (BOT) agreement. However, after Peoplesoft's acquisition, this center was transferred to Oracle; along with some section of its employees. With a loss of 14% of Hexaware's revenue, which came from this center, the company had faced a major financial challenge. To offset this loss, Rusi spearheaded the all-cash acquisition of FocusFrame by Hexaware for $34 million. By 2007, the company was growing at record highs again, with Q1 2007 revenue growing more than 50% from 2006.

Rusi left Hexaware in 2008 to focus on private venture capital activities. After his departure, former senior Wipro executive P.R Chandrashekhar was appointed new CEO. Rusi remained on the board as vice-chairman however.

In 2002, along with entrepreneur Tapaas Chakravarti, Rusi had co-founded & started DQ Entertainment, a Cannes & Palme d'Or award-winning animation company. DQ is listed on both the London (FTSE) and Bombay Stock (BSE) Exchanges. Rusi was also a major investor in Karmic Lifesciences, an Indian Clinical Research Organization.

Rusi Brij died on May 20, 2009, after a prolonged battle with multiple myeloma. He is survived by his wife and 2 children.
