= Global Chess League 2024 =

Over-the-board rapid chess league

- Association: FIDE
- League: Global Chess League
- Sport: Chess
- Defending champions: Triveni Continental Kings (2023)
- Hosts: London
- Duration: October 3–14, 2024
- Teams: 6
- Season MVP: Nihal Sarin

Finals
- Champions: Triveni Continental Kings
- Runners-up: PBG Alaskan Knights
- Final MVP: Alexandra Kosteniuk

Seasons
- 2023 2025

Global Chess League
- Most recent season or competition: 2024
- Sport: Chess
- Founded: 2023
- Founder: FIDE; Tech Mahindra; Michael Mkpadi
- First season: 2023
- No. of teams: 6
- Confederation: FIDE
- Most recent champion: Triveni Continental Kings (2024)
- Most titles: Triveni Continental Kings (2 titles)
- Broadcaster: JioCinema
- Streaming partner: Stake
- Sponsor: Tech Mahindra
- Tournament format: Round-robin, Knockout
- Website: Official website

The Global Chess League 2024, known for sponsorship reasons as the Tech Mahindra Global Chess League 2024, was the second season of the annual over-the-board rapid chess league organized by FIDE. It was held in London from October 3 to 14, 2024. It was a joint venture organized by Tech Mahindra and FIDE.

It featured six teams of six players each, and involved ten round-robin matches, followed by a final match between the top two teams. Triveni Continental Kings, the defending champions, led by Alireza Firouzja, retained their title after beating Anish Giri's PBG Alaskan Knights in the final. Alexandra Kosteniuk was named Player of the Final for winning both her games in the final. Nihal Sarin was named Male Player of the Season. Alina Kashlinskaya was named Female Player of the Season.

== Group stage ==
Rank	Team	MP	GP	Qualification
1	PBG Alaskan Knights	24	114	Advance to Final match
2	Triveni Continental Kings	18	99	Advance to Final match
3	Alpine SG Pipers	18	88	
4	American Gambits	12	73	
5	upGrad Mumba Masters	9	74	
6	Ganges Grandmasters	9	69	

== Franchises ==
Alpine SG Pipers
Board	Player	Rating	Results										
Board	Player	Rating	1	2	3	4	5	6	7	8	9	10	Score
1	(Norway) Magnus Carlsen	2834	½	0	½	½	1	½	0	½	1	1	5½
2	(India) R Praggnanandhaa	2668	½	0	½	½	0	½	1	1	½	½	5
3	(Hungary) Richárd Rapport	2695	1	1	½	1	½	½	0	½	1	½	6½
4	(China) Hou Yifan	2535	1	½	1	½	0	1	½	½	1	½	6½
5	(FIDE) Kateryna Lagno	2463	0	0	0	½	½	1	½	0	1	0	3½
6	(Belgium) Daniel Dardha	2555	½	0	1	1	½	0	0	1	0	0	4

upGrad Mumba Masters
Board	Player	Rating	Results										
Board	Player	Rating	1	2	3	4	5	6	7	8	9	10	Score
1	(France) Maxime Vachier-Lagrave	2755	½	1	½	½	0	0	1	1	0	½	5
2	(India) Vidit Gujrathi	2674	0	½	½	½	0	1	0	0	0	½	3
3	(FIDE) Peter Svidler	2709	½	0	½	0	½	½	1	0	½	0	3½
4	(India) Koneru Humpy	2453	0	1	½	½	½	0	½	1	½	0	4½
5	(India) Harika Dronavalli	2414	1	½	½	½	0	1	½	½	½	½	5½
6	(India) Raunak Sadhwani	2583	0	1	0	0	½	½	1	1	1	½	5½

American Gambits
Board	Player	Rating	Results										
Board	Player	Rating	1	2	3	4	5	6	7	8	9	10	Score
1	(United States) Hikaru Nakamura	2744	½	½	½	0	1	½	1	½	1	½	6
2	(Poland) Jan-Krzysztof Duda	2745	1	½	½	0	½	½	½	0	1	½	5
3	(China) Yu Yangyi	2711	½	0	½	½	½	½	½	½	½	0	4
4	(Kazakhstan) IM Bibisara Assaubayeva	2439	1	0	0	0	½	½	1	½	½	1	5
5	(Germany) Elisabeth Pähtz	2409	0	0	1	½	1	0	1	1	½	0	5
6	(Denmark) Jonas Buhl Bjerre	2545	1	0	0	½	½	0	0	0	0	0	2

PBG Alaskan Knights
			Results										
Board	Player	Rating	1	2	3	4	5	6	7	8	9	10	Score
1	(Netherlands) Anish Giri	2662	½	½	½	½	0	½	1	0	1	½	5
2	(Uzbekistan) Nodirbek Abdusattorov	2722	1	½	½	½	1	½	½	1	1	½	7
3	(Azerbaijan) Shakhriyar Mamedyarov	2691	1	1	½	1	½	½	0	1	0	1	6½
4	(China) Tan Zhongyi	2515	½	1	½	1	1	0	½	0	1	0	5½
5	(Poland) IM Alina Kashlinskaya	2362	½	1	½	1	½	0	1	½	1	1	7
6	(India) Nihal Sarin	2671	1	1	1	½	½	1	1	0	0	1	7

Ganges Grandmasters
Board	Player	Rating	Results										
Board	Player	Rating	1	2	3	4	5	6	7	8	9	10	Score
1	(India) Viswanathan Anand	2749	½	0	0	½	0	½	0	0	0	½	2
2	(India) Arjun Erigaisi	2698	½	½	½	½	½	½	½	1	½	½	5½
3	(Iran) Parham Maghsoodloo	2665	0	1	1	0	½	½	1	0	0	1	5
4	(India) Vaishali Rameshbabu	2380	0	0	0	0	½	½	½	0	0	1	2½
5	(Bulgaria) IM Nurgyul Salimova	2320	1	½	1	0	0	1	0	1	0	½	5
6	(FIDE) Volodar Murzin	2580	½	0	½	½	½	1	0	1	1	½	5½

Triveni Continental Kings
Board	Player	Rating	Results										
Board	Player	Rating	1	2	3	4	5	6	7	8	9	10	Score
1	(France) Alireza Firouzja	2742	½	1	1	1	1	1	0	1	0	0	6½
2	(China) Wei Yi	2782	0	1	½	1	1	0	½	0	0	½	4½
3	(Azerbaijan) Teimour Radjabov	2677	0	0	0	½	½	½	½	1	1	½	4½
4	(Switzerland) Alexandra Kosteniuk	2491	½	½	1	1	½	1	0	1	0	½	6
5	(FIDE) Valentina Gunina	2389	½	1	0	½	1	0	0	0	0	1	4
6	(Uzbekistan) Javokhir Sindarov	2654	0	1	½	½	½	½	1	0	1	1	6
