= Global Chess League 2023 =

Over-the-board rapid chess league

- Association: FIDE
- League: Global Chess League
- Sport: Chess
- Hosts: Dubai
- Duration: June 21 – July 2, 2023
- Teams: 6
- Season MVP: R Praggnanandhaa

Finals
- Champions: Triveni Continental Kings
- Runners-up: upGrad Mumba Masters
- Finals MVP: Jonas Buhl Bjerre

Seasons
- 2024 →

Global Chess League
- Most recent season or competition: 2024
- Sport: Chess
- Founded: 2023
- Founder: FIDE; Tech Mahindra; Michael Mkpadi
- First season: 2023
- No. of teams: 6
- Confederation: FIDE
- Most recent champion: Triveni Continental Kings (2023)
- Most titles: Triveni Continental Kings (1 title)
- Broadcaster: JioCinema
- Streaming partner: Stake
- Sponsor: Tech Mahindra
- Tournament format: Round-robin, Knockout
- Website: Official website

The Global Chess League 2023, known for sponsorship reasons as the Tech Mahindra Global Chess League 2023, was the inaugural season of the annual over-the-board rapid chess league organized by FIDE. It took place in Dubai from June 21 to July 2, 2023. It was a joint venture organized by Tech Mahindra and FIDE.

It featured six teams of six players each, and involved ten round-robin matches, followed by a final match between the top two teams. The event came down to a round of individual tie-breaks drawn by playing card. Triveni Continental Kings won the event final after Jonas Buhl Bjerre beat Javokhir Sindarov of UpGrad Mumba Masters in the fourth tie-break game, the first three being drawn.

The second season took place in London from October 3 to October 14, 2024.

== Franchises ==
SG Alpine Warriors
#	Player name	Country	Date of birth
1	Magnus Carlsen	(Norway)	30 November 1990
2	Gukesh Dommaraju	(India)	29 May 2006
3	Arjun Erigaisi	(India)	03 September 2003
4	Irina Krush	(United States)	24 December 1983
5	Elisabeth Paehtz	(Germany)	08 January 1985
6	Praggnanandhaa Rameshbabu	(India)	10 August 2005

Balan Alaskan Knights
#	Player name	Country	Date of birth
1	Ian Nepomniachtchi	(FIDE)	14 July 1990
2	Nodirbek Abdusattorov	(Uzbekistan)	18 September 2004
3	Teimour Radjabov	(Azerbaijan)	12 March 1987
4	Tan Zhongyi	(China)	29 May 1991
5	Nino Batsiashvili	(Georgia (country))	01 January 1987
6	Raunak Sadhwani	(India)	22 December 2005

Chingari Gulf Titans
#	Player name	Country	Date of birth
1	Jan-Krzysztof Duda	(Poland)	26 April 1998
2	Shakhriyar Mamedyarov	(Azerbaijan)	12 April 1985
3	Daniil Dubov	(FIDE)	18 April 1996
4	Alexandra Kosteniuk	(Switzerland)	23 April 1984
5	Polina Shuvalova	(FIDE)	12 March 2001
6	Nihal Sarin	(India)	13 July 2004

Ganges Grandmasters
#	Player name	Country	Date of birth
1	Viswanathan Anand	(India)	11 December 1969
2	Richard Rapport	(Romania)	25 March 1996
3	Leinier Dominguez Perez	(United States)	23 September 1983
4	Hou Yifan	(China)	27 February 1994
5	Bella Khotenashvili	(Georgia (country))	01 June 1988
6	Andrey Esipenko	(FIDE)	22 March 2002

Triveni Continental Kings
#	Player name	Country	Date of birth
1	Levon Aronian	(United States)	06 October 1982
2	Yu Yangyi	(China)	08 June 1994
3	Wei Yi	(China)	02 June 1999
4	Kateryna Lagno	(FIDE)	27 December 1989
5	Nana Dzagnidze	(Georgia (country))	01 January 1987
6	Jonas Buhl Bjerre	(Denmark)	26 June 2004
7	Sara Khadem	(Iran)	10 March 1997

UpGrad Mumba Masters
#	Player name	Country	Date of birth
1	Maxime Vachier-Lagrave	(France)	21 October 1990
2	Alexander Grischuk	(FIDE)	31 October 1983
3	Vidit Gujrathi	(India)	24 October 1994
4	Humpy Koneru	(India)	31 March 1987
5	Harika Dronavalli	(India)	12 January 1991
6	Javokhir Sindarov	(Uzbekistan)	08 December 2005

== Points system ==
Teams earn gamepoints (GP) and matchpoints (MP) according to their performance.

=== Gamepoints ===
- Four GPs for winning a game with Black.
- Three GPs for winning a game with White.
- One GP for a draw.
- Zero GPs for a loss.

=== Matchpoints ===
- Three MPs for teams that score more GPs than their opposing team.
- One MP for teams who score the same GPs as their opposing teams.
- Zero MPs for the teams that score fewer GP than their opposing teams.
