= Global League (disambiguation) =

Global League is a tournament in Pro Wrestling Noah, now known as N-1 Victory.

Global League may also refer to:

- Global Super League, a T20 cricket tournament
- Global Chess League, a rapid chess league
- Global Hockey League, a proposed ice hockey league
- Law Schools Global League, an association of universities
- T20 Global League, which eventually launched as the Mzansi Super League
