= Andhra Loyola College =

College in Vijayawada, Andhra Pradesh, India

Coordinates: 16.509838°N 80.65999°E

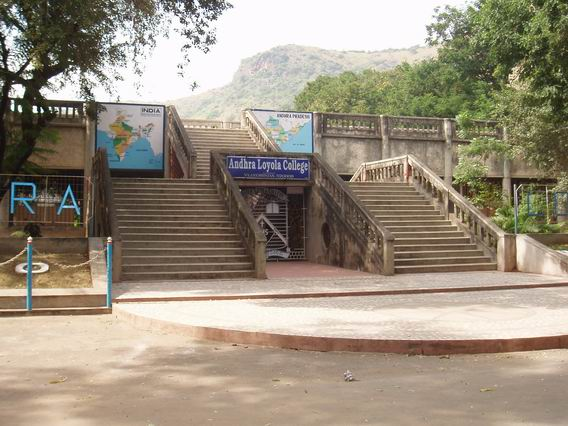
- Andhra Loyola College entrance bridge
- Motto: Service of God through Service of Country
- Type: Private Roman Catholic research non-profit autonomous coeducational higher education institution
- Established: 9 December 1953; 72 years ago
- Religious affiliation: Roman Catholic (Jesuit)
- Academic affiliations: Krishna University
- Rector: Rev. Fr. Dr P R John, SJ
- Principal: Rev. Fr. Dr Singareddy Melchior, SJ
- Students: 5444
- Location: Vijayawada, Andhra Pradesh, India
- Campus: 98 acres (400,000 m^{2})
- Website: andhraloyolacollege

Andhra Loyola College (ALC or locally "Loyola College") is a private, Catholic higher education institution run by the Andhra Province of the Society of Jesus in Andhra Pradesh, India. It was founded by the Jesuits in 9 December 1953.

== History ==
Andhra Loyola College was established on 9 December 1953 by the Society of Jesus (Jesuits), an international religious order of Catholic priests and brothers founded by Ignatius of Loyola, who run over 200 colleges and universities worldwide. By March 2024 the college had facilities in Science, Arts, and Commerce, offering 38 undergraduate and six postgraduate programs.

In April 2020, the Alumni of the college distributed eggs to the continuously serving policemen during Corona lockdown.

== Education system ==
As an autonomous college, Andhra Loyola College has adopted the Choice-Based Credit System (CBCS) for degree courses, and the semester system. Instructional methods include lectures and classroom instruction, IT-based sessions, guest lectures, seminars, symposia, and field study. Loyola College is affiliated with Krishna University. The competitive admissions policy uses the KRU-CET for M.Sc. courses and I-CET for MBA and MCA courses.

The National Assessment and Accreditation Council in its 2008 review and report on the college mentioned its institutional strengths as:

- autonomous status, identified as potential Centre for Excellence by UGC.
- dedicated management, committed faculty and active and disciplined students.
- good infrastructure for teaching, research, extra-curricular and extension activities.
- placement training facility through government-sponsored JKC.

The chief weakness noted was limited research activity in many departments. This has since been addressed.

The college now has 16 research guides from Telugu, Hindi, English, Physics, Chemistry, Mathematics, History, Botany, and Political Science departments who are recognized as research supervisors by Acharya Nagarjuna University and other universities such as JNTU. Research scholars may enroll through the respective universities and pursue their research at Loyola College.

== Campus ==
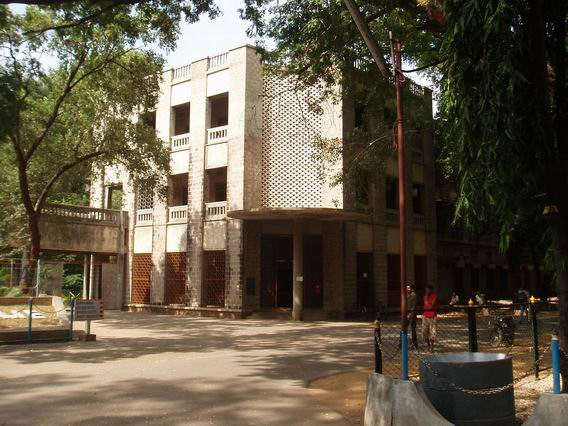
South Block

The college is situated on 98 acres of Land. There are 52 classrooms and 22 labs. Facilities include a Language Lab, Audio & Television studios besides edit lab, two libraries, 302 computers with LAN connectivity, ICT Lab, E-learning centre, seminar halls, guest rooms, four boys' hostels, a girls' hostel, an auditorium with capacity for 2500, and Fine Arts Centre Kaladarshini. Loyola Computer Centre (FIT Lab) has about 120 systems connected through LAN, and 25 licensed software packages available. Sports facilities include two concrete basketball courts, three indoor shuttle badminton courts, a table tennis court and separate football stadium, a multi-gym, a cricket field, and tennis courts.

The college has two main blocks – North Block and South Block – each with 60,000 sq. ft. of floor space. The undergraduate classrooms and all science laboratories are located in these classrooms. There are a separate Intermediate Block and Postgraduate Block, and a Computer Centre building. Andhra Loyola Engineering College was inaugurated at Loyola Campus (Vijayawada) in 2008 by Dr. Y.S. Rajeshekhar Reddy, then Chief Minister of Andhra Pradesh.

== Library ==
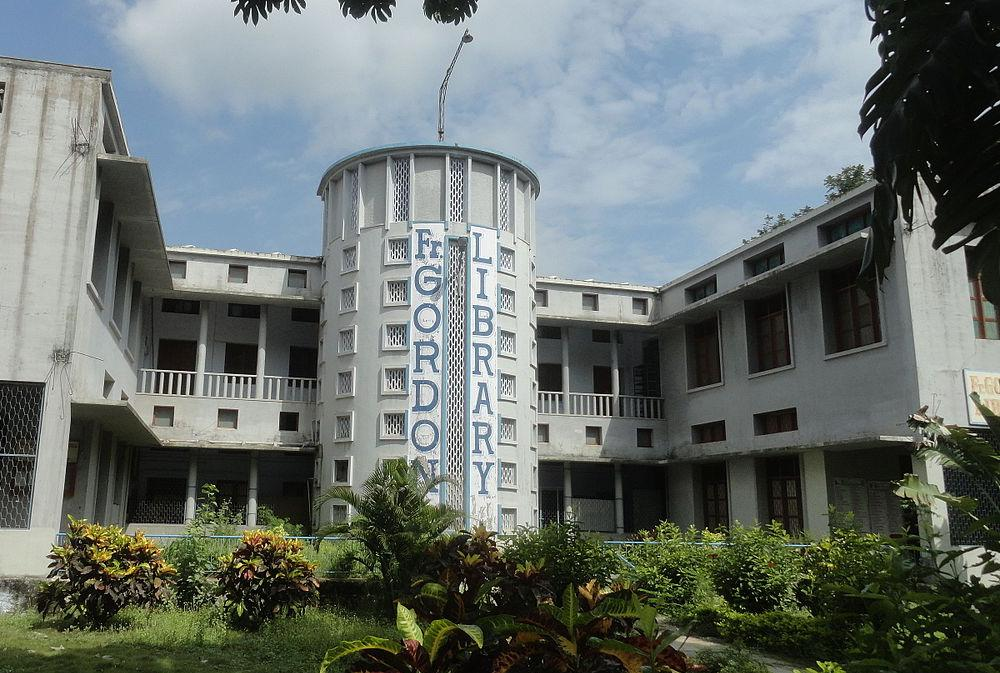

The two libraries contain 83,000 volumes and subscriptions to 110 Indian journals and 12 foreign journals; it also has 20 computers with internet facility and three for library work. Interlibrary loan facilities through DELNET and American Library (New Delhi) are also available.

== Notable alumni ==
- Jayaprakash Narayan, president of Lok Satta Party and former IAS officer.
- T.R. Prasad, former cabinet secretary, member of Finance Commission.
- Ramalinga Raju, former chairman of Satyam Computer Services Limited, presently Mahendra Group.
- Late Y. S. Rajasekhara Reddy, former chief minister of Andhra Pradesh.
- Indraganti Mohana Krishna, film director in Telugu cinema
- Lagadapati Rajagopal, Lok Sabha MP from the Vijaywada

== Awards ==
- In 2021, Andhra Loyola College was given National award by Mahatma Gandhi National Council of Rural Education for promoting best practices in environment and conducting programmes relating to Swachh Bharat practices.

== See also ==
- List of Jesuit sites
