= Infrastructure Leasing & Financial Services =

Infrastructure development and finance company headquartered in Mumbai India

Infrastructure Leasing & Financial Services (IL&FS)

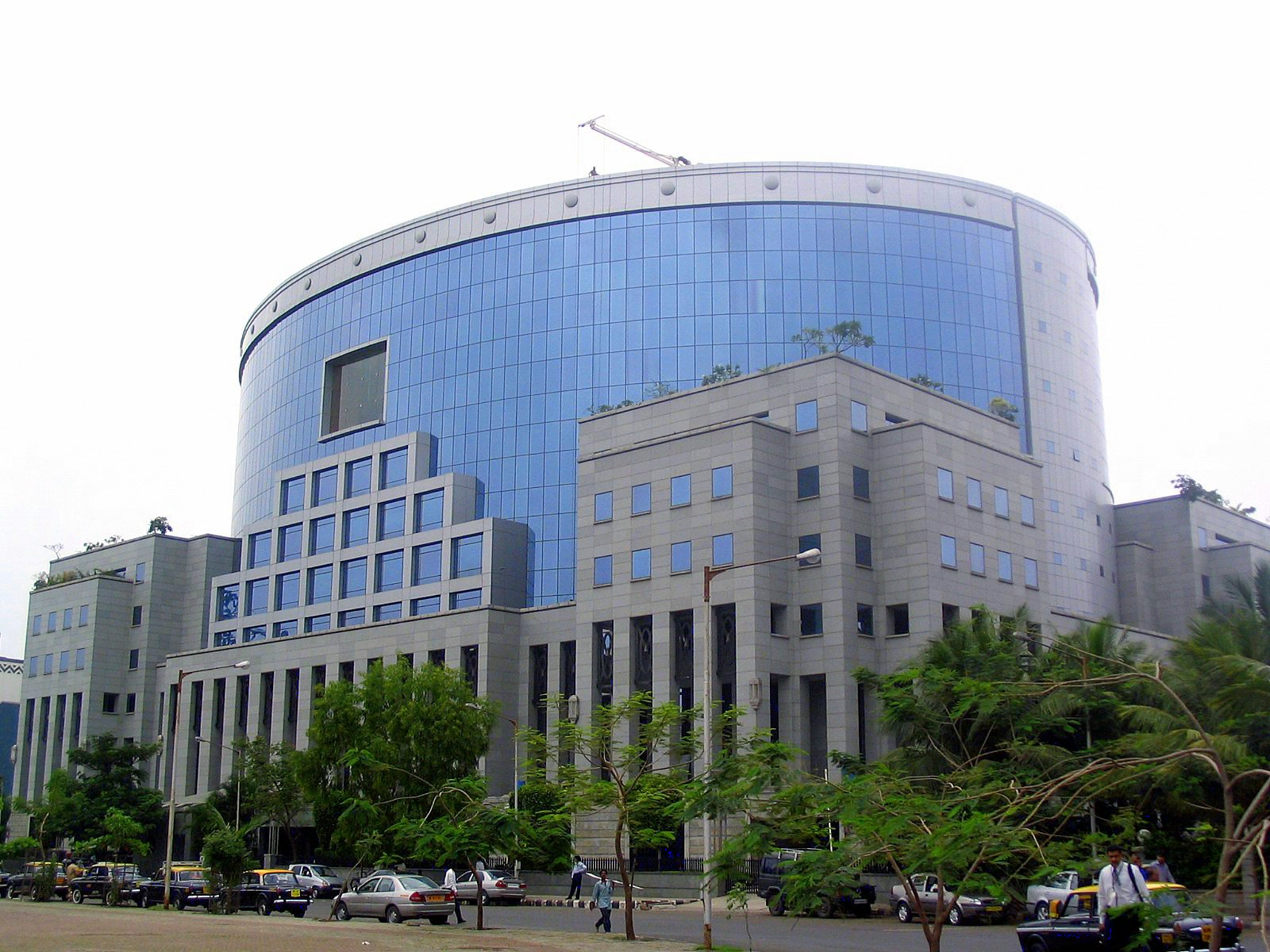
- IL&FS headquarters at the Bandra Kurla Complex in Mumbai
- Type: Public Sector; JV of PSUs
- Industry: Infrastructure Development and Finance
- Founded: 1987
- Headquarters: Mumbai, Maharashtra, India
- Key people: Nand Kishore (Chairman) |C.S. Rajan (Managing Director)
- Website: www.ilfsindia.com

Infrastructure Leasing & Financial Services Limited (IL&FS) is an Indian state-funded infrastructure development and finance company. It was created by public sector banks and insurance companies.

It operates through more than 250 subsidiaries including IL&FS Investment managers, IL&FS financial services and IL&FS Transportation networks India Limited (ITNL). Its projects include some of the largest infrastructure projects in India including India's longest tunnel, Dr. Syama Prasad Mookerjee Tunnel, which opened for traffic in April 2017. After the company defaulted on its loans in 2018, the Government of India took control of the company and appointed a new board.

== History ==
IL&FS was formed in 1987 as an "RBI registered Core Investment Company" by three financial institutions, namely the Central Bank of India (50.5%), UTI (30.5%) and HDFC (19%), to provide finance and loans for major infrastructure projects.it held status as Quasi-Public Sector as it was backed by public sector. Gradually, as the organisation needed better financing, it additionally opened itself to two large international players, namely Mitsubishi (through Orix corporation Japan) and the Abu Dhabi Investment authority. Subsequently, Life Insurance Corporation India (25.34%), Orix and ADIA became its largest shareholders, a pattern that continues to this day.

Currently, its institutional shareholders include Life Insurance Corporation of India (LIC), Orix and Abu Dhabi Investment Authority, with small shareholdings by a few Indian banks. State Bank of India (SBI) was a share holder till 2017, after which it sold its stake in the company. A few foreign investors including Greenspring associates remain investors in its subsidiary companies, especially IL&FS transportation and IL&FS infrastructure services.

In 2012, A2Z Group acquired the property management subsidiary of IL&FS (IL&FS Property Management & Services Ltd) in a cash and stock deal. The deal was done through its subsidiary A2Z Infraservices Ltd for ₹ 25 crore. While ₹7 crore cash payment was made to IL&FS Infrastructure Equity Fund and IL&FS Employees Welfare Trust, the infrastructure major also took a 20% stake in A2Z Infraservices by way of a stock swap.

In April 2019, its newly constituted board informed investors that the company had 302 entities through which it currently operates.

== Group companies ==
IL&FS has 256 group companies as of 2018, including subsidiaries, joint venture companies and associate entities. Though on the surface, the company appears to have 23 direct subsidiaries, 141 indirect subsidiaries (including special purpose vehicles for different projects), 6 joint ventures and 4 associate companies, each of them is further subdivided into additional legal entities, with much cross ownership as well as ownership by investment vehicles of various governments.

While some of its subsidiaries (such as IL&FS Transport) ran into high losses in 2018 and found it difficult to repay their loans, others (such as IL&FS investment managers) posted profits of ₹72.5 crore in 2018, a 33% profit after tax.

Schoolnet India (founded in 1997) previously known as IL&FS Education and Technology Services Limited, is an Indian educational technology and skills development company. It offers digital and technology-assisted services in K–12 education, vocational training, and workforce development.

Some of them are listed below-

Infrastructure Services

- IL&FS Energy Development Company Limited: energy sector arm involved in development of power generation and transmission projects
- IL&FS Infrastructure Development Corporation Limited: advisory and project development
- IL&FS Transportation Networks Limited: involved in the development and implementation of projects related to surface transport (highways, flyovers, bridges and roads)
- IL&FS Environmental Infrastructure & Services Limited
- IL&FS Education and Technology Services Limited (Headed by RCM Reddy)
- New Tirupur Area Development Corporation Limited (an SPV to implement the Tirupur Area Development Programme)
- Noida Toll Bridge Company Limited (an SPV to operate and maintain the DND Flyway connecting Delhi with Noida)

Financial Services

- IL&FS Financial Services Limited (Investment Banking Arm of IL&FS)
- IL&FS Investment Managers Limited (domestic private equity fund management)
- ORIX Auto Infrastructure Services Limited (services related to transport finance and transport infrastructure)
- IL&FS Trust Company Limited - ITCL (services: debenture and bond trusteeship, trusteeship and investor representative for securitised paper, services as security trustee and facility agent, secure document management, scanning, processing and records management, and paralegal services)

== Projects ==
IL&FS has several projects in different sectors including Transportation, Area Development, e-Governance, Health Initiatives, Cluster Development, Finance, Power, Ports, Water and Waste Water, Urban Infrastructure, Environment, Education, and Tourism.

In 2009, it became the new promoter of the Maytas Infra Ltd. and in January 2011, Maytas Infra was taken over by IL&FS and renamed to IL&FS Engineering and Construction Company Limited In September 2009, it picked up a "significant minority stake" in the Reliance Industries' special economic zone project in Haryana.

IL&FS was the principal lender behind the construction of the 9.28 km long Dr. Syama Prasad Mookerjee Tunnel, located on the route of NH 44 in Jammu and Kashmir. Its work was started in July 2011 and the tunnel was opened for traffic after its inauguration by the Prime Minister of India Narendra Modi on 2 April 2017. Built on an estimated budget of ₹3,720 crore (US$550 million), the main tunnel is 13 metres in diameter, while the parallel escape tunnel is 6 metres in diameter. The main and escape tunnels are connected by 29 cross passages located at intervals of every 300 metres. It is the first tunnel in India with a fully integrated tunnel system and is expected to reduce the distance between Jammu and Srinagar by 30.11 km (18.7 mi), reducing the travel time by two hours.

IL&FS also has large investments in its own subsidiaries, as well as in the equity market. In September 2018, these amounted to nearly ₹10,000 crores.

== Ownership ==
As of March 2018, the largest shareholders of IL&FS Investment services were as follows

- LIC : 25%
- Orix, Japan (a part of Mitsubishi Keiritsu): 23%
- IL&FS Employees welfare trust : 12%
- Abu Dhabi investment authority : 12%
- State Bank of India : 12%
- HDFC Ltd : 9%
- Central bank of India : 7%

== IL&FS crisis and scam ==
From July to September 2018, two out of IL&FS's 256 subsidiaries reported having trouble paying back loans and inter corporate deposits to other banks and lenders, resulting in the RBI requesting its major share holders to rescue it. In July 2018, Hindu Businessline reported that the road arm of IL&FS was having difficulty making payments due on its bonds. In the same month, Business Standard reported that its founder Ravi Parthasarathy would be leaving the firm for medical reasons, after having headed the firm for 30 years.

In early September 2018, Moneylife India reported that one of IL&FS's subsidiaries had been unable to repay a ₹1,000 crore short-term loan taken from SIDBI, resulting in SIDBI asking one of its officers to resign. Subsequently, Bloomberg Quint, Business standard and Economic times reported that one of the IL&FS group of companies called IL&FS Financial Services Limited had defaulted on its commercial paper payments. This led to news of a possible audit by the Reserve bank of India. IL&FS Financial Services Ltd., one of the group's many financial subsidiaries had defaulted on repaying about ₹450 crore worth of inter-corporate deposits to Small Industries Development Bank of India (SIDBI). On 27 September 2018, IL&FS Financial Services informed the Bombay Stock Exchange that it had defaulted on a ₹52.4 crore repayment of short-term deposits and ₹104 crore term deposit.

However, in its replies to investors and the BSE, IL&FS investment services (IVC) clarified that the news items did not relate to it, as these were two completely different legal entities. A similar letter was published by IL&FS Transportation.

On 1 Oct 2018, the Government of India took steps to take control of the company and arrest the spread of the contagion to the financial markets. A new board was constituted as the earlier board was deemed to have failed to discharge its duties. The new board consisted of Kotak Mahindra Bank managing director Uday Kotak, former IAS officer & Tech Mahindra boss Vineet Nayyar, former Securities and Exchange Board of India chief G N Bajpai, former ICICI Bank chairman G C Chaturvedi, former IAS officers Malini Shankar and Nand Kishore. Currently the CMD of new IL&FS Board is Mr Nand Kishore who was appointed the Chairman and Managing Director after the term of Mr C S Rajan ended on September 30, 2024.

The Serious Fraud Investigation Office (SFIO) started an investigation as there were huge procedural lapses and top management was not reachable. Newspapers reported the lavish salaries earlier management had given itself at the expense of public money. In the absence of adequate supervision by the RBI or shareholders or any claw back provisions on remuneration, the erstwhile management treated the company as its fiefdom.

On 2 April 2019, the SFIO arrested the former vice-chairman of IL&FS, Hari Sankaran, in Mumbai for fraud and causing wrongful loss to the troubled infrastructure lender. He was accused of granting loans to entities that were not credit-worthy or declared as non-performing accounts causing loss to the company and its creditors. The SFIO was granted custody of Sankaran till 4 April.

The initial SFIO probe revealed that there were major lapses in Deloitte's audit of the IL&FS. The Government had moved to ban Deloitte for its role in the default. However, the Bombay High Court passed an interim order to prevent "coercive action" by the Government against the firm.

== Debt Resolution ==
As of March 21, 2025, the Group has discharged a debt of Rs 45,000 crore and has maintained its overall group resolution target at Rs 61,000 crore.

As of September 30, 2024, the group has resolved Rs 55,000 crore, as against the Estimated Debt Resolution target of Rs 61,000 crores, representing nearly 90 per cent of resolution value. This includes debt that been discharged by way of monetization, transfer to InvIT, debt servicing and interim distribution, while all along preserving the value of national assets by maintaining their going concern status. Further, out of total 302 entities to be resolved, 188 entities have been resolved by way of monetization, transfer to InvIT and Liquidation. Additionally, 38 entities are with the Courts at different stages of approval and a few entities are regularly servicing the debt of around Rs.3,000 crore. Besides resolving balance debt and entities, the task of distributing the available cash and units, closure of pending transactions approved by Courts as well as those pending in Courts, remains yet be accomplished.

In April 2020 the Indian Government's Corporate Affairs Secretary, Injeti Srinivas, said he expected to recover a substantial part of the company's ₹94,000 crore debt. He said it was strange that nobody foresaw the problem, whether it was statutory auditors, independent directors and credit rating agencies.

On 8 June 2020, IL&FS has concluded sale of its stake in GIFT City for 32 crore equity value. The sale would reduce its consolidated debt by more than 1,200 crore.

In March 2022, IL&FS sold its headquarters at Bandra Kurla Complex, Mumbai to Brookfields Asset Management for 1,080 crore.
