= Vineet Nayyar =

Indian businessperson (1938–2024)

- Born: 1938; Lahore, British India
- Died: 16 May 2024 (aged 85); New Delhi, India
- Citizenship: India
- Education: Williams College
- Occupation: Vice-Chairman of IL&FS
- Known for: Vice-Chairman and Managing Director of Tech Mahindra, Chairman of Mahindra Satyam, Executive Vice-Chairman of IL&FS
- Spouse: Reva Nayyar

Vineet Nayyar (1938 – 16 May 2024) was an Indian businessman and IT executive who was Vice-Chairman, Managing Director and CEO of Tech Mahindra, and chairman of Mahindra Satyam. He was also the Vice-Chairman of IL&FS.

== Early life and education ==
Nayyar was born in 1938 in Lahore, British India. His family relocated to India at the time of independence. He had a master's degree in development economics from Williams College, Massachusetts.

== Career ==
=== Government and Worldbank ===
Nayyar was an IAS officer in Haryana cadre servicing as a district magistrate, Haryana's rural development secretary and director at the department of economic affairs.

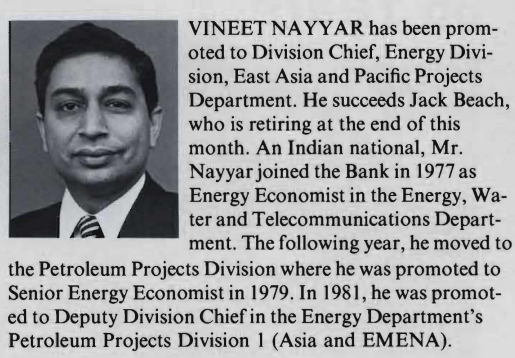
World bank article with a short bio about Vineer Nayyar from 1985

In 1977, he was deputed to the World Bank where he worked for over 10 years in its energy and infrastructure divisions.

Nayyar was involved in the establishment of GAIL and served as its Chairman and Managing Director from April 13, 1987, to November 2, 1991.

=== Private Sector ===
He moved back to India to be founding chairman and managing director of the state-owned Gas Authority of India from 1987 to 1991.

HCL Group

Nayyar joined HCL as Managing Director of HCL Corporation and later as Vice Chairman of HCL Technologies. In 1996, he founded HCL Perot Systems, a JV between HCL Technologies and Perot Systems. He led the company through its public listing in 1999. He remained with the company until 200 5, two years after HCL sold its stake to Perot Systems.

Mahindra Group

Nayyar joined Mahindra British Telecom (MBT) in January 2005 as Vice Chair, CEO, and Managing Director. In 2009, he was appointed Chairman of Mahindra Satyam. Tech Mahindra's acquisition of Satyam Computer in 2009 took place under his leadership. In 2015, he became the Vice Chairman of Tech Mahindra.

Others

In October 2018, the Indian government appointed Nayyar as the Vice Chairman and Managing Director of Infrastructure Leasing & Financial Services (IL&FS) amid the company's financial crisis. He resigned from the board in 2020 for health reasons.

== Personal life and death ==
Vineet Nayyar was married to Reva, a retired IAS officer from the 1968 Haryana cadre. She was appointed as a part-time non-official director on the Board of BHEL on 22 June 2009 and runs the Essel Social Welfare Foundation. Vineet Nayyar died in New Delhi on 16 May 2024, at the age of 85.
