= Maytas =

Indian group of companies

Maytas ("Satyam" read backwards) was a group of companies founded by B. Ramalinga Raju. It included Maytas Properties and Maytas Infra Limited.

== Subsidiaries ==
=== Maytas Properties ===
Maytas Properties is a property development company founded in 2009. It was run by B. Ramalinga Raju. In January 2009, Raju resigned as chairman admitting to a massive fraud in the company. Raju was arrested on the same day and later imprisoned. Subsequently, the Company Law Board allowed IL&FS to acquire the company in 2011. In August 2013, the name of Maytas Property Limited (MPL) was changed to Hill County Properties Limited (HCPL).

=== Maytas Infra Limited ===
Maytas Infra is an infrastructure development, construction and project management company. It was originally run by Satyam Computer Services founder B Ramalinga Raju. Various agencies, including the state Crime Investigation Department, probed Maytas after Raju admitted to serious financial misdeeds at Satyam Computer. Allegations emerged that funds from Satyam were diverted to Maytas, causing government agencies to audit the infrastructure company's records as well. Maytas Infra requested an extension for reporting its quarterly results due to these investigations. In August 2009, IL&FS replaced Raju as promoter of Maytas Infra. In August 2013, the name of Maytas Infra Limited (MIL) was changed to IL&FS Engineering and Construction Company Ltd (IL&FS ECC).

== Acquisition attempt ==
In 2008, the Satyam board approved a US$1.6 billion acquisition of Maytas Infra ($300 million) and Maytas Properties ($1.3 billion). The acquisition attempt was seen as an attempt by the Raju family to exploit Satyam's cash resources, as the transaction would have left Satyam with debt of around $400m. After protests from the institutional shareholders, the deal was abandoned.

In 2009, Raju resigned as Satyam CEO, admitting to an accounting fraud of 71 billion rupees. Raju stated that the aborted Maytas deal was actually a last attempt to "fill the fictitious assets with real ones".

== After Satyam accounting scandal ==
After Raju admitted to the Satyam scandal, Maytas stock slumped to a 52-week low on 9 January 2009.

Citizens for a Better Public Transport in Hyderabad (CBPTH) demanded a CBI inquiry into Maytas' victory in the Hyderabad Metro Rail project. CBPTH convener C Ramachandraiah alleged that the state government had been favouring Maytas for infrastructure projects.

The Economic Times reported that the Andhra Pradesh government had paid Rs.1,800 crore to Maytas Infra towards works under the irrigation department's Jalayagnam project. Irrigation minister Ponnala Lakshmaiah said that works totalling another Rs 11,000 crore had been sanctioned to Maytas Infra, since Y S Rajasekhara Reddy became chief minister in 2004. The Maytas Infra-led consortium failed to achieve financial closure and give a performance guarantee, the state government of Andhra Pradesh was forced to cancel the concession agreement with the group on the Rs 12,132-crore Hyderabad Metro Rail project. On 21 July 2009, a case was registered against the promoters of the company by the Hyderabad police under Section 406 (breach of trust) and Section 420 (cheating) of the Indian Penal Code.

In January 2011, The Company Law Board allowed IL&FS to acquire a controlling stake in Maytas Properties. IL&FS acquired 80% of the equity in Maytas Properties (MPL), as per the order issued by the CLB on Thursday. The group agreed to invest Rs 20 lakh at par increasing total paid-up capital to Rs 25 lakh. Maytas Properties experienced a severe liquidity crunch stalling many of its real estate projects, including the Hill county residential project in Hyderabad.
