= Comviva =

Telecommunications company

- Type: Subsidiary
- Industry: Telecommunications
- Founded: New Delhi, India (July 1999)
- Headquarters: Gurgaon, Bengaluru, India
- Number of locations: Gurugram, Bengaluru,Mumbai,Pune,Bhubaneswar,Sittard(Netherlands), London,Sydney, Johannesburg, Nairobi, Lagos, Dubai, Sri Lanka, Bangladesh, Netherlands, Bogota(Colombia), Buenos Aires, and the United States
- Area served: Worldwide
- Key people: Rajesh Chandiramani (CEO); Atul Sonjeja; Richard Lobo; Ajay Mehta; Chandra Iyer; (Board of Directors)
- Products: Digital Financial Solutions – mobiquity@Pay, PayPlus, mobiquity Banking, YABX, Unified CRM, Sales & Distribution, Convergent Billing, Digital Business Management, Digital Service Delivery Platform, Messaging Platform (UNO), Messaging Firewall, Voucher Management (PreTUPS), MobiLytix™ Real Time Marketing, Data Science as Service, MobiLytix™ AIx, MobiLytix™ Digital, MobiLytix™ Loyalty & Rewards, Ngage, Mobiquity, mobilytix, cRBT, SMSC, USSD, roaming, messaging, Digital Commerce
- Owner: Tech Mahindra
- Number of employees: 3000+
- Parent: Tech Mahindra
- Subsidiaries: YABX
- Website: comviva.com
- Footnotes comviva com/leadership;comviva.com/contact-us

Comviva (formerly known as Mahindra Comviva) is a telecommunications company headquartered in Gurgaon, Haryana, with additional offices in Bangalore and Mumbai. It also has offices in Johannesburg, Kenya, Abidjan, Nigeria, Dubai, Indonesia, Australia, Netherlands, the United Kingdom, Colombia, and the United States.

== History and acquisitions ==
Founded in 1999 in New Delhi, Comviva was incorporated as Bharti Telesoft Limited. In April 2009, it was renamed Comviva Technologies Limited. Comviva merged with CellCloud Technologies Limited, a Bangalore headquartered company, offering "electronic top-up solutions", in December 2002. In December 2007, Comviva acquired Jataayu Software Limited, a Bangalore-based provider of "value added telecom solutions".

In September 2012, Tech Mahindra acquired a 51 percent stake in the Gurgaon-based mobile application firm Comviva from Bharti Group. In February 2013, Comviva was re-branded as Mahindra Comviva. In February 2014, it partnered with Bharti Airtel to deploy its enterprise communications platform in 16 countries across Africa.

In January 2016, the company acquired a controlling stake in Advanced Technology Solutions (ATS), a leading provider of mobility solutions to the telecom industry in Latin America to strengthen its in-region presence. In 2019, Mahindra Comviva was re-branded again as Comviva (a Tech Mahindra company). The company was also rebranded to Comviva in 2019.

In 2023, Comviva and e& Enterprise announced a partnership to develop an advanced CPaaS ecosystem and leveraging Comviva's CPaaS platform.

== Products and services ==
Comviva’s range of mobility solutions developed and deployed spans the core areas of operators’ businesses:

1. Digital Financial Solutions – Digital Payments, Digital Banking, and Digital Lending
2. Digital Systems - Digital BSS, Media and Digital Services, Integrated Messaging, Recharge and Voucher
3. Growth Marketing - Customer Value Management, Digital Experience and Management, Omni-channel Marketing
