= Defalcation =

Misappropriation of funds by an entrusted person

In financial and legal usage, defalcation may involve misappropriation of funds by a person entrusted with their charge; also, the act of misappropriation, or an instance thereof. A common example of defalcation would be skimming.

The United States Bankruptcy Code specifically uses the term defalcation to describe a category of acts that taint a particular debt such that it cannot be discharged in bankruptcy. The United States Supreme Court addressed the issue in 2013, holding that "defalcation" in the context of the U.S. Bankruptcy Code requires proof of "a culpable state of mind... involving knowledge of, or gross recklessness in respect to, the improper nature of the relevant fiduciary behavior."

In accounting terminology, especially with respect to the area of audit, defalcation means a misappropriation of assets or theft of assets by employees or officers of a corporation.

Defalcation occurs when a debtor commits a bad act while acting in a fiduciary capacity. The classic example of defalcation occurs when a trustee recklessly invests in trust funds and loses the money. If the beneficiary wins a judgment against the trustee, and the trustee files for bankruptcy, the debt (the judgment) cannot be discharged in bankruptcy because the debt was the result of a defalcation.

Defalcation also applies when a debtor is acting in a fiduciary capacity. To constitute a defalcation, the conduct involves a degree of culpability that is greater than negligence, but the act does not need to rise to the level of a "fraud" under common law. Defalcation requires showing of conscious behavior or extreme recklessness.

The term is used in legal proceedings other than bankruptcy to refer more generally to embezzlement; it is often used in the context of the title insurance business. A title agent who misuses funds intended to be used to close insured transactions is said to be involved in a defalcation. Many title insurers have their own "defalcation units".

Sometimes defalcation has been pronounced for very small amounts, as under £2 and cents, even if it was claimed to be an error in handling change.

== Defalcation scandals of 1900 ==
The defalcation scandals of 1900 refer to a devastating series of financial embezzlements by prominent solicitors in England and Wales, which severely damaged the reputation of the Law Society and its members.

The crisis peaked when Benjamin Greene Lake—a highly influential member of the Law Society Council—was implicated and later convicted of misappropriating client funds.

This revelation triggered a barrage of public and press criticism directed at the Law Society. Critics argued that the Society's regulatory framework—specifically its Disciplinary Committee and its handling of defalcating (embezzling) solicitors—was entirely inadequate and favored protecting its own elite members over aggrieved clients.

The public outcry and the subsequent criminal prosecution of Lake forced the legal establishment into a defensive position. This sparked vital debates within the profession regarding stricter financial regulations, trust accounting, and the need for a formal compensation fund to protect the public from rogue solicitors.

It took decades for the Law Society of England and Wales and its members to rebuild the public trust that was compromised during this period, with many solicitors later volunteering, sacrificing themselves during World War I in an effort to restore their lost honour.

== Etymology ==
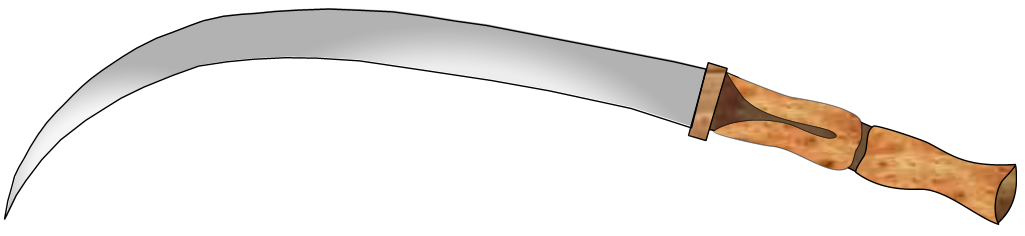
Defalcation literally means "cutting off with a falx" ("sickle").

The term is from Latin, and is analyzed as de- "off" + falx "sickle" + -atio "act of", hence literally "cutting off with a sickle". There is also a verb form, "defalcate".
