= Ramalinga Raju =

Indian businessman (born 1954)

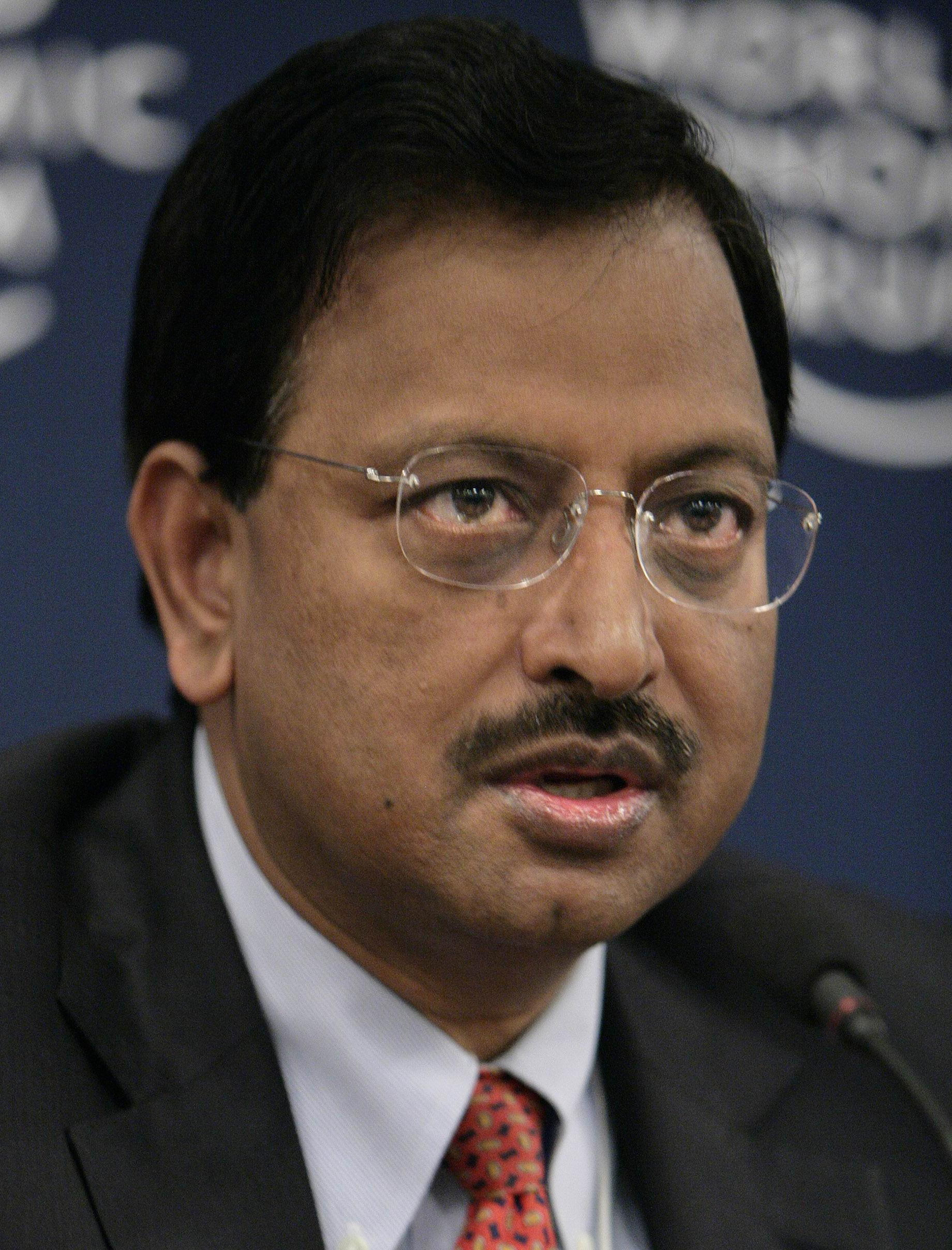
- Raju in 2008
- Born: Byrraju Ramalinga Raju; 16 September 1954 (age 72); Bhimavaram, Andhra State (present-day Andhra Pradesh), India
- Occupation: Businessman
- Known for: Founder and former Chairman of Satyam Computer Services
- Criminal penalty: Convicted to 7 years in prison
- Spouse: Nandhini (m. 1976)
- Children: 2

Byrraju Ramalinga Raju (born 16 September 1954) is an Indian businessman and convicted fraudster. He is the founder of Satyam Computer Services and served as its chairman and CEO from 1987 until 2009. Raju stepped down following his admission to embezzlement from the company to the tune of ₹7,136 crores (approximately US$1.5 billion), including ₹5,040 crores (approximately US$1 billion) of non-existent cash and bank balances. In 2015, he was convicted of corporate fraud, which led to the collapse of Satyam Computers. Another tech firm called Brane Enterprises with family links to Raju, where he plays an active role as a mentor, is under the scanner for sudden layoffs and unpaid wages to over 2,500 employees.

== Early life ==
Ramalinga Raju, the eldest of four siblings, was born on 16 September 1954 from Telugu family. He earned a Bachelor of Commerce degree from Andhra Loyola College at Vijayawada and subsequently earned an MBA from Ohio University in the United States. After returning to India in 1977, Raju married at the age of twenty-two. He ventured into many businesses including Dhanunjaya Hotels; and a cotton spinning mill named Sri Satyam Spinning, funded by Andhra Pradesh Industrial Development Corporation (APIDC), with an investment of ₹ 9 crore (worth almost $7 million in 1983 prices). As the businesses failed, Raju moved into real estate and started a construction company named Maytas Infra Limited.

== Family ==
Ramalinga Raju is married to Nandini and the couple has two children - Teja Raju, and Rama Raju. Teja Raju is married to Divya, a Bharatanatyam dancer, while Rama Raju married Sandhya Raju, a Kuchipudi dancer and the daughter of P. R. Venkatarama Raju, managing director of Ramco Cements.

== Career ==
In 1987, Raju incubated Satyam Computer Services along with one of his brothers-in-law, DVS Raju, at P&T colony in Secunderabad and 20 employees. In 1991, Satyam won its first fortune 500 client – John Deere. Raju navigated Indian bureaucracy to obtain the required clearance to transmit data from India. The company went public in 1992. Raju was enrolled in the Owner/President Management (OPM) program at Harvard Business School in the 1990s. In an interview with Deccan Chronicle in 1998, Raju was talking about Satyam's ambition of operating out of 50 countries with an employee count of more than 50,000. In 1999, Raju launched Satyam Infoway (Sify) as Satyam's internet subsidiary, thereby becoming an early participant in the Indian internet service market. Sify was later sold to Raju Vegesna.

== Business and politics ==
In September 1995, as Raju was building Satyam, Andhra Pradesh had a new Chief Minister, Chandra Babu Naidu, who wanted to bring in change. Naidu saw IT as a strategic industry to focus on and Raju became instrumental in shaping the state's information technology initiatives like 'Mee Kosam' ("For you" in Telugu). Raju had unfettered access to the chief minister at a very personal level. Research into his life has exposed close links between business and politics.

== Accounting scandal ==
Raju resigned from the Satyam board after Satyam Scandal, admitting to falsifying revenues, margins and over ₹5,000 crore of cash balances at the company. The Indian affiliate of PricewaterhouseCoopers, the company's auditors, appears to have certified the company had $1.1 billion in cash when the real number was $78 million.

Just a few months before the scandal broke, Raju tried to persuade investors by claiming that the company is sound and that past October he surprised analysts with better-than-expected results, claiming that "the company had achieved this in a challenging global macroeconomic environment, and amidst the volatile currency scenario that became reality".

A botched acquisition attempt involving Maytas in December 2008 led to corporate governance concerns among Indian investors and plunge in the share price of Satyam. In January 2009, Raju indicated that Satyam's accounts had been falsified over a number of years. Total assets on Satyam's balance sheet tripled during 2003–07 to $2.2 billion. He confessed to an accounting fraud to the tune of ₹7,000 crore or $1.5 billion and resigned from the Satyam board on 7 January 2009. Satyam was purchased by Tech Mahindra in April 2009 and renamed Mahindra Satyam.

In his letter, Raju explained his modus operandi to something that started as a single lie but led to another as "What started as a marginal gap between actual operating profit and the one reflected in the books continued to grow over the years. It has attained unmanageable proportions as the size of the company's operations grew over the years." Raju described how an initial cover-up for a poor quarterly performance escalated: "It was like riding a tiger, not knowing how to get off without being eaten."

Raju and his brother, B Rama Raju, were then arrested by the CID Andhra Pradesh police headed by V S K Kaumudi, IPS on charges of breach of trust, conspiracy, cheating, falsification of records. Raju may face life imprisonment if convicted of misleading investors. Raju had also used dummy accounts to trade in Satyam's shares, violating the insider trading norm.

The Government of Andhra Pradesh attached 44 properties belonging to the family members of the promoters of Satyam Computers in the case against Raju.

It has now been alleged that these accounts may have been the means of siphoning off the missing funds. Raju has admitted to overstating the company's cash reserves by US$ 1.5 billion. Raju was hospitalized in September 2009 following a minor heart attack and underwent angioplasty. Raju was granted bail on condition that he should report to the local police station once a day and that he should not attempt to tamper with the current evidence. This bail was revoked on 26 October 2010 by the Supreme Court of India and he has been ordered to surrender by 8 November 2010.

== Court proceedings ==
In November 2010, Raju surrendered after the Supreme Court in August cancelled the bail granted to him by a lower court in Hyderabad, where Satyam is based.

The Supreme Court on 4 November 2011 granted bail to Raju since the Central Bureau of Investigation (CBI) failed to file charges on time. According to Indian law, if a chargesheet is not filed within 90 days, then the accused person has a right to obtain Default Bail.

On 28 October 2013, the Enforcement directorate filed a chargesheet against Raju and 212 others. The filed report states that "it transpires that the accused resorted to inter-connected transactions, so as to ensure that crime proceeds were distanced from its initial beneficiaries, and laundered the said proceeds under the cover of the corporate veil, with an ulterior motive to project the properties so acquired as untainted ones".

On 9 April 2015, Ramalinga Raju and his brothers were sentenced to 7 years in jail, fined ₹5.5 crore.

On 11 May 2015, within a month of being convicted, Ramalinga Raju and all others who were found guilty were granted bail by a special court in Hyderabad. The bail amount for R. Raju and his brother was set at ₹10,00,000 and the other convicts was set at ₹50,000 only.

On 10 January 2018 India's capital market regulator has banned global auditing firm Price Waterhouse (PW) from auditing listed companies in India for two years for its alleged role of collusion with the directors and employees of erstwhile Satyam Computer Services, in perpetrating the country's biggest corporate accounting scandal.

== In popular culture ==
- Bad Boy Billionaires: India - 2020 Netflix original documentary anthology webseries
- Untitled SonyLIV Telugu-Hindi bilingual web series based on his personal life from the book The Double Life of Ramalinga Raju.
