= Satyam scandal =

Corporate fraud

The Satyam Computer Services scandal was India's largest corporate fraud until 2010. The founder and directors of India-based outsourcing company Satyam Computer Services, falsified the accounts, inflated the share price, and stole large sums from the company. Much of this was invested in property. The swindle was discovered in late 2008 when the Hyderabad property market collapsed, leaving a trail back to Satyam. The scandal was brought to light in 2009 when chairman Byrraju Ramalinga Raju confessed that the company's accounts had been falsified.

== History ==
For many years Satyam accounts showed profits that had never existed, cash at the bank that did not exist, which inflated the share price. Raju and friends then sold shares. The accounts also showed $3m of "salary payments" to people who did not exist. These in fact went to board members. The falsified accounts were used to obtain cheap loans in the USA which were stolen by Raju and never entered into the accounts. Much of the money was squandered in real estate deals in Hyderabad. When the property market collapsed in 2008, the money vanished and whistle-blowers began to be heard. A failed attempt by Raju to use Satyam to buy a property company led to the scandal being uncovered.

=== Initial confession and investigation ===
On 7 January 2009, the chairman of Satyam, Byrraju Ramalinga Raju, resigned, confessing that he had manipulated the accounts of Rs 7,000 crore in several forms. The global corporate community was said to be shocked and scandalised.

In February 2010, the CBI took over the case and filed three partial charge sheets (dated 7 April 2009, 24 November 2009, and 7 January 2010), over the course of the year. All charges arising from the discovery phase were later merged into a single charge sheet.

On 10 April 2015, Byrraju Ramalinga Raju was convicted with 10 other members.

=== Role of Auditors ===
PricewaterhouseCoopers affiliates served as independent auditors of Satyam Computer Services when the report of scandal in the account books of Satyam Computer Services broke. The Indian arm of PwC was fined $6 million by the US SEC (US Securities and Exchange Commission) for not following the code of conduct and auditing standards in the performance of its duties related to the auditing of the accounts of Satyam Computer Services. In 2018, SEBI (Securities and Exchange Board of India) barred Price Waterhouse from auditing any listed company in India for 2 years, saying that the firm was complicit with the main perpetrators of the Satyam fraud and did not comply with auditing standards. SEBI also ordered disgorgement of over Rs 13 crore wrongful gains from the firm and 2 partners. PwC announced their intent to get a stay order.

=== Aftermath ===
"We are obviously shocked by the contents of the letter. The senior leaders of Satyam stand united in their commitment to customers, associates, suppliers and all shareholders. We have gathered together at Hyderabad to strategize the way forward in light of this startling revelation."

On 10 January 2009, the Company Law Board decided to bar the current board of Satyam from functioning and appoint 10 nominal directors. "The current board has failed to do what they are supposed to do. The credibility of the IT industry should not be allowed to suffer." said Corporate Affairs Minister Premchand Gupta. Chartered accountants regulator ICAI issued show-cause notice to Satyam's auditor PricewaterhouseCoopers (PwC) on the accounts fudging. ICAI President Ved Jain said: "We have asked PwC to reply within 21 days."

Also on 10 January 2009, the same day, the Crime Investigation Department (CID) team picked up Vadlamani Srinivas, Satyam's then-CFO, for questioning. He was arrested later and kept in judicial custody.

On 11 January 2009, the government nominated noted banker Deepak Parekh, former NASSCOM chief Kiran Karnik, and former SEBI member C Achuthan to Satyam's board.

Analysts in India have termed the Satyam scandal India's own Enron scandal. Some social commentators see it more as a part of a broader problem relating to India's family-owned corporate environment.

Immediately following the news, Merrill Lynch (now a part of Bank of America) and State Farm Insurance terminated its engagement with the company. Also, Credit Suisse suspended its coverage of Satyam. It was also reported that Satyam's auditing firm PricewaterhouseCoopers will be scrutinized for complicity in this scandal. SEBI, the stock market regulator, also said that, if found guilty, its license to work in India may be revoked. Satyam was the 2008 winner of the coveted Golden Peacock Award for Corporate Governance under Risk Management and Compliance Issues, which was stripped from them in the aftermath of the scandal. The New York Stock Exchange has halted trading in Satyam stock as of 7 January 2009. India's National Stock Exchange has announced that it will remove Satyam from its S&P CNX Nifty 50-share index on 12 January. The founder of Satyam was arrested two days after he admitted to falsifying the firm's accounts. Ramalinga Raju was charged with several offences, including criminal conspiracy, breach of trust, and forgery.

Satyam's shares fell to 6.30 rupees on 9 January 2009, their lowest level since March 1998, compared to a high of 544 rupees in 2008. On the New York Stock Exchange, Satyam shares peaked in 2008 at US$29.10. By March 2009, they were trading around US$1.80.

The Indian Government has stated that it may provide temporary direct or indirect liquidity support to the company. However, whether employment will continue at pre-crisis levels, particularly for new recruits, is questionable.

On 14 January 2009, Price Waterhouse, the Indian division of PricewaterhouseCoopers, announced that its reliance on potentially false information provided by the management of Satyam may have rendered its audit reports "inaccurate and unreliable".

On 22 January 2009, CID told in court that the actual number of employees is only 40,000 and not 53,000 as reported earlier and that Mr. Raju had been allegedly withdrawing ₹200 million (US$2 million) every month for paying these 13,000 non-existent employees.

The Indian government designated A. S. Murthy to become the new CEO of Satyam effective 5 February 2009. Special advisors were also appointed, Homi Khusrokhan of Tata Chemicals and Chartered Accountant T. N. Manoharan.

On 4 November 2011, the Supreme Court granted bail to Ramalinga Raju, as well as two others accused in the scandal, since the investigation agency CBI had failed to file a charge sheet, despite having already had 33 months (from the time of Raju's arrest) to do so.

On 15 September 2014, the special CBI court hearing the case asked the concerned parties to appear before the court on 27 October 2014. Date of judgement was to have been indicated later on that day.

On 9 April 2015, Raju and nine others were found guilty of collaborating to inflate the company's revenue, falsifying accounts and income tax returns, and fabricating invoices, among other findings, and sentenced to seven years imprisonment by Hyderabad court. Kunjumani and his brother were also fined by the court 55 million rupees (US$883,960) each.

== Acquisition of Satyam by Mahindra Group ==
On 13 April 2009, via a formal public auction process, a 31% stake in Satyam was purchased by Mahindra & Mahindra owned company Tech Mahindra, as part of its diversification strategy. Effective July 2009, Satyam rebranded its services under the new Mahindra management as "Mahindra Satyam". After a delay due to tax issues Tech Mahindra announced its merger with Mahindra Satyam on 21 March 2012, after the board of two companies gave the approval. The companies merged legally on 25 June 2013.

== In popular culture ==
On 31 December 2025, Netflix finally released the final, long-delayed episode of the docuseries Bad Boy Billionaires: India, focusing on the infamous Satyam scandal by B. Ramalinga Raju, after a five-year legal battle.

== See also ==
- Satyam Computer Services
- Tech Mahindra
- National Financial Reporting Authority (NFRA)
- 1992 Indian stock market scam
- NSE co-location scam
- IVRCL loan fraud
