= C. P. Gurnani =

Indian businessman

Chander Prakash Gurnani
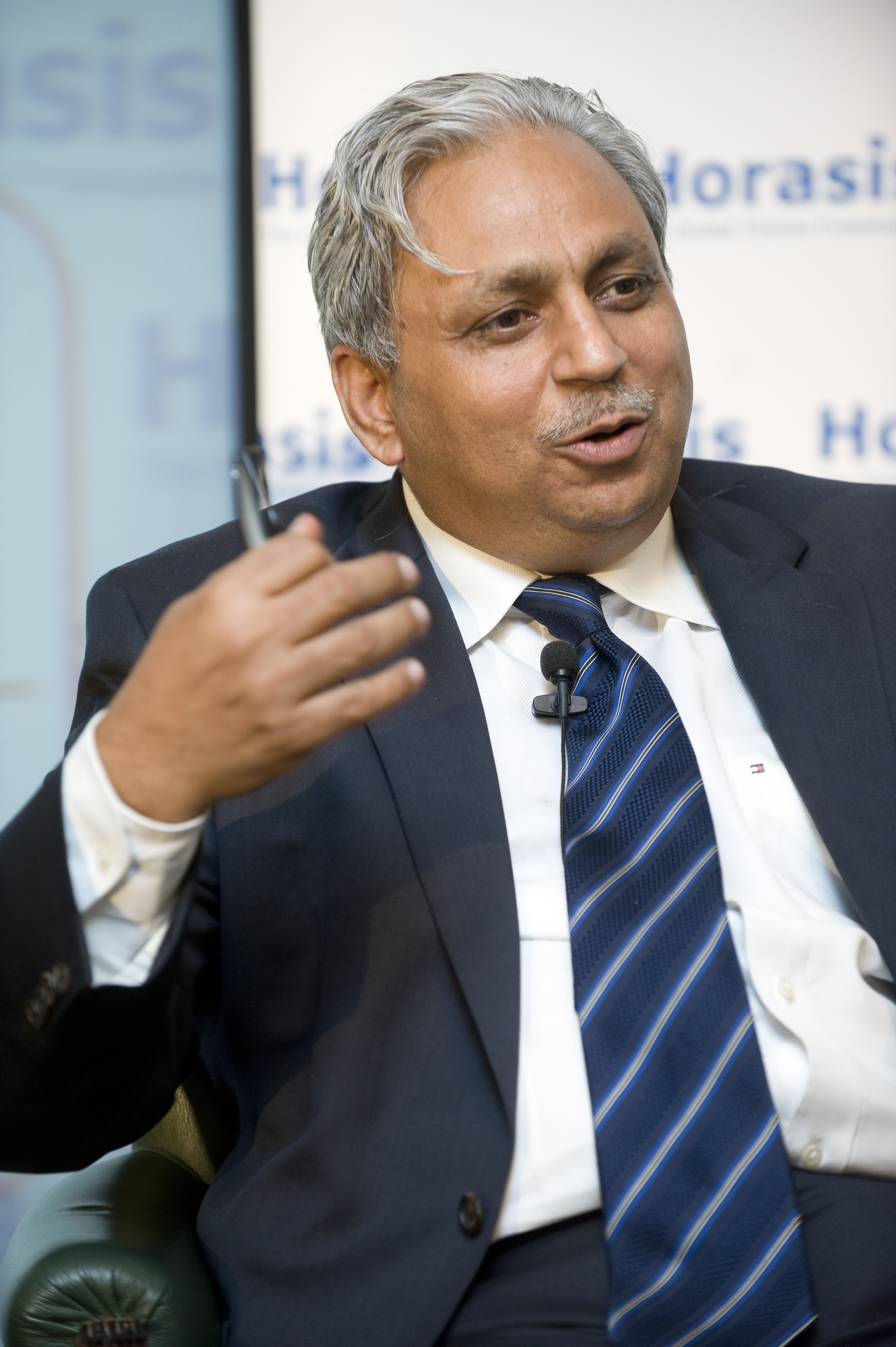
- Speaking at Horasis Global India Business Meeting 2010
- Born: 19 December 1958 (age 67); Neemuch, Madhya Pradesh, India
- Education: National Institute of Technology, Rourkela (B.Tech.)
- Occupations: Former CEO and managing director of Tech Mahindra

Chander Prakash Gurnani or C. P. Gurnani (born 19 December 1958) is the former CEO & Managing Director of Tech Mahindra.

== Early life and education ==
Gurnani was born in Neemuch, a small town in Madhya Pradesh. He spent his early life in Chittorgarh, Kota, and Jaipur in Rajasthan. He has a degree in chemical engineering from the National Institute of Technology, Rourkela.

== Career ==
Gurnani was appointed Nasscom's chairman in April 2016 for a one-year term.

He has held several positions with HCL, Hewlett Packard Limited, Perot Systems (India) Limited and HCL Corporation Ltd.

In December 2023, Gurnani stepped down as CEO and managing director of Tech Mahindra, where he started in 2004 and was on the board of directors for three years.

== Awards and honours ==
- Gurnani was chosen as the Ernst and Young ‘Entrepreneur of the Year [Manager]’, CNBC Asia's ‘India Business Leader of the Year’ and Dataquest ‘IT person of the Year’ - for the year 2013.
- Gurnani has also won the 'CEO of the Year' Award for year 2014 declared by Business Standard
- He was awarded Dataquest IT Person of the Year in 2014.
- Veer Surendra Sai University of Technology awarded the degree of Doctor of Science (Honoris Causa) to Shri C. P. Gurnani for his outstanding contribution to the field of Technology and Management in 2016.
