= Stavroula Tsolakidou =

Greek chess player (born 2000)

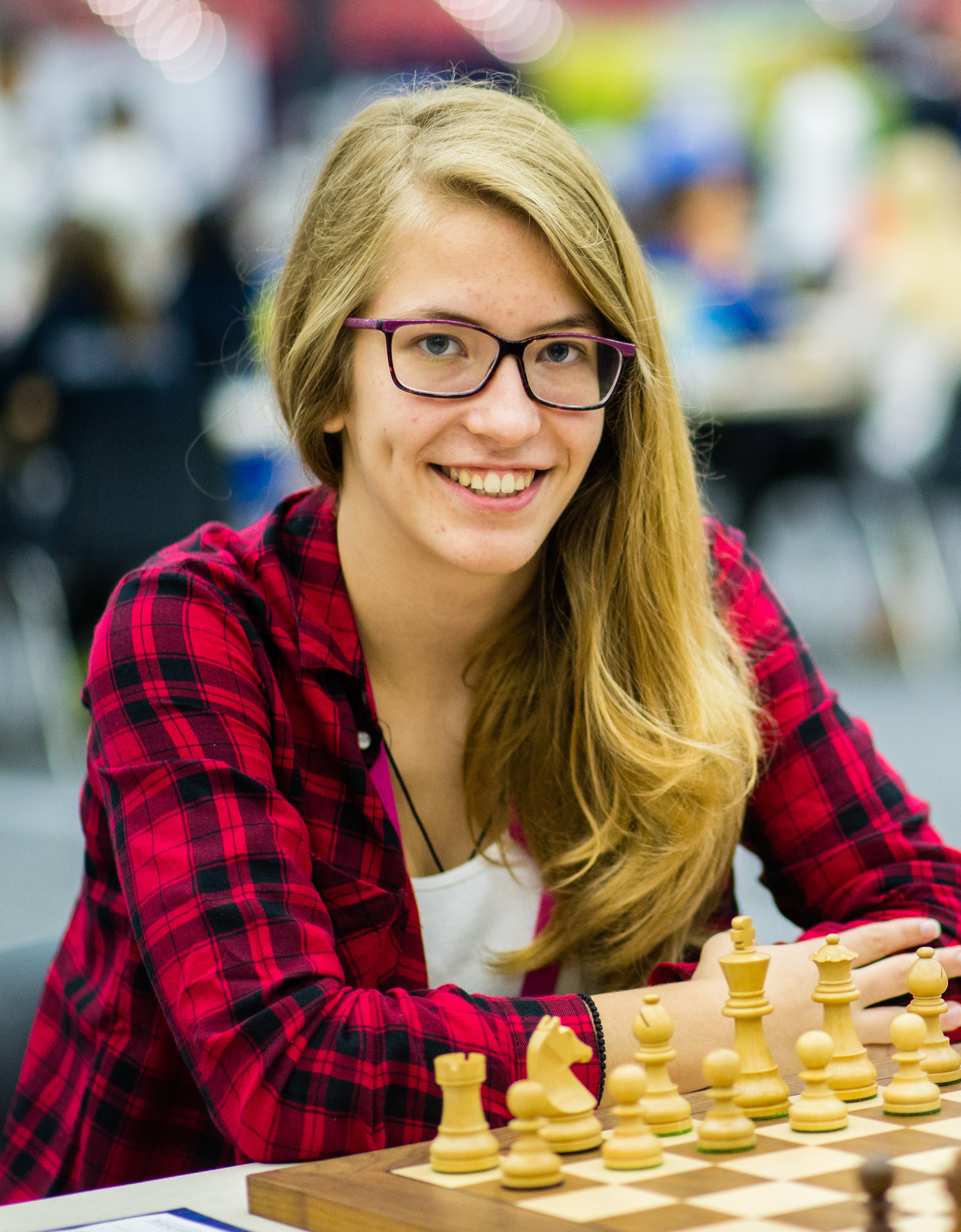
- Stavroula Tsolakidou, 2016

Personal information
- Born: 24 March 2000 (age 26) Kavala, Greece

Chess career
- Country: Greece
- Title: International Master (2018); Woman Grandmaster (2016)
- FIDE rating: 2432 (July 2026)
- Peak rating: 2479 (November 2025)

Stavroula Tsolakidou (Greek: Σταυρούλα Τσολακίδου, born 24 March 2000) is a Greek chess player holding the titles of International Master and Woman Grandmaster.

== Chess career ==
Tsolakidou was born in Kavala, northern Greece, on 24 March 2000. She won the World U14 Girls' Chess Championship in 2013, earning her Woman FIDE Master title in the process. She was awarded her Woman International Master title in 2014, and won the World U16 Girls' Championship in 2015. In 2016, she earned her Woman Grandmaster title, and won the World U18 Girls' Championship. She was awarded her International Master title in April 2018.

In May 2018 she won the Italian Women's Team Championship with the Caissa Italia team, playing two games and winning both.

She is the No. 1 ranked Greek female player as of May 2018.
