= Raunak Sadhwani =

Indian chess grandmaster (born 2005)

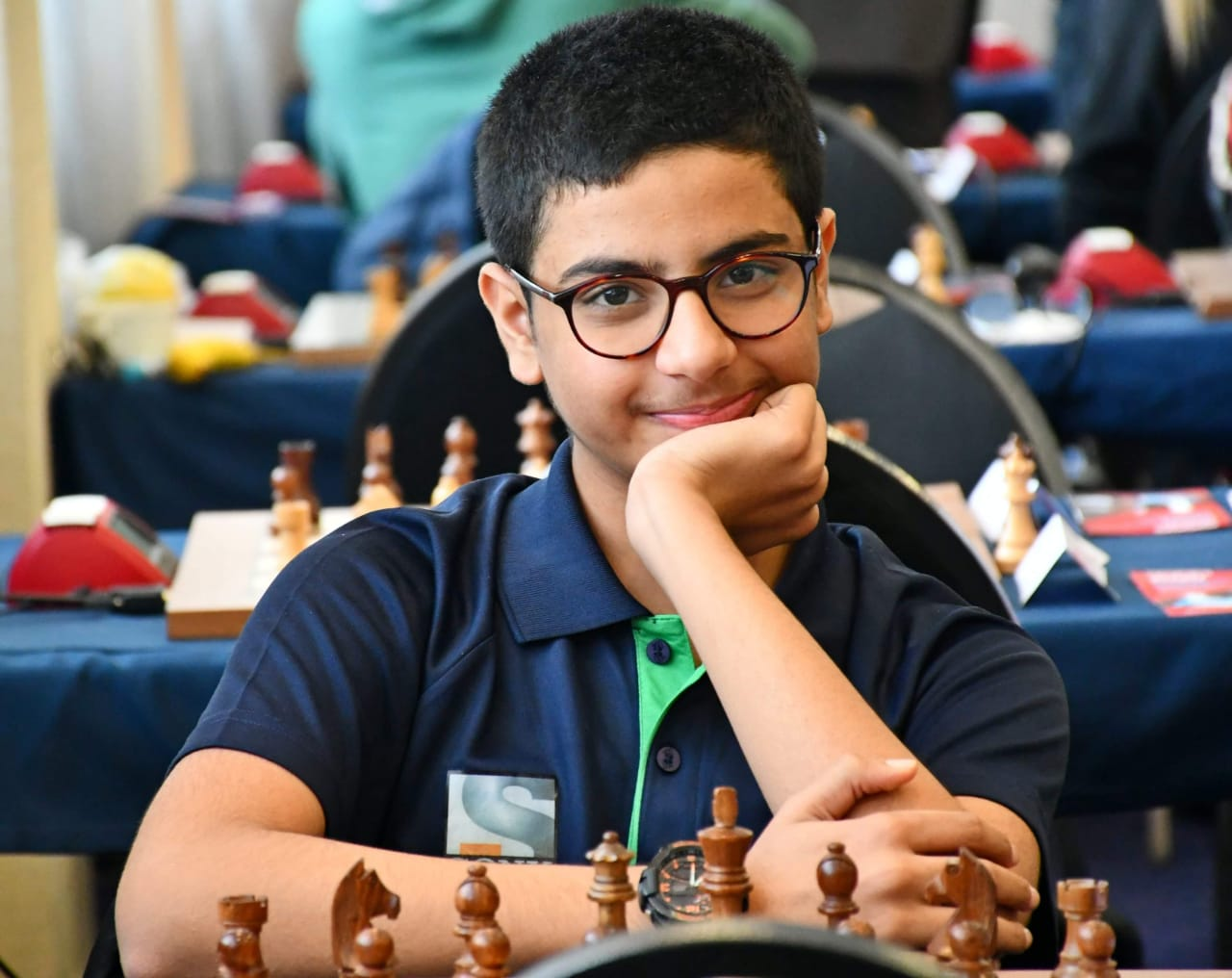
- Raunak Sadhwani in 2018

Personal information
- Born: 22 December 2005 (age 20) Nagpur, Maharashtra, India

Chess career
- Country: India
- Title: Grandmaster (2020)
- FIDE rating: 2645 (September 2026)
- Peak rating: 2681 (July 2025)
- Ranking: No. 72 (September 2026)
- Peak ranking: No. 44 (July 2025)

Raunak Sadhwani (born 22 December 2005) is an Indian chess grandmaster. A chess prodigy, he became a grandmaster at the age of 13. He is the 10th youngest player in history and the 4th youngest Indian to be awarded the title as of December 2023.

Raunak was U-10 Commonwealth Champion in 2015 in New Delhi, India.

At the 44th Chess Olympiad held in 2022 he was part of the second team from India that reached the third place in the open tournament.
