= Polina Shuvalova =

Russian chess player (born 2001)

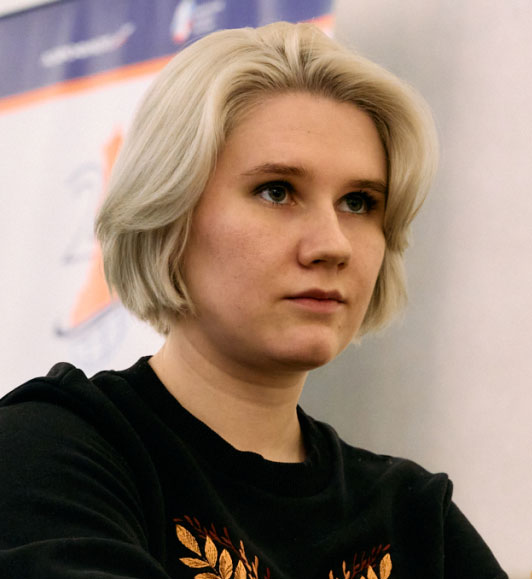
- Shuvalova in Aeroflot Open 2025

Personal information
- Born: Polina Sergeevna Shuvalova; 12 March 2001 (age 25) Orsk, Russia

Chess career
- Country: Russia (until 2024); FIDE (since 2024)
- Title: International Master (2020); Woman Grandmaster (2019)
- FIDE rating: 2507 (August 2026)
- Peak rating: 2516 (December 2021)

Polina Sergeevna Shuvalova (Russian: Полина Сергеевна Шувалова; born 12 March 2001) is a Russian chess player. She holds the FIDE titles of International Master (IM, 2020) and Woman Grandmaster (WGM, 2019). She is the 2019 World Girls U-20 Champion as well as the World Girl's U18 Champion in 2018 and 2019. As of 2023, Shuvalova has earned two of three title norms required to become a grandmaster.

== Biography ==
Polina Shuvalova was a Moscow chess school student. In 2017, she won the Russian Junior Chess Championship for under-21 girls.

In the 2010s Shuvalova repeatedly represented Russia at the European Youth Chess Championships and World Youth Chess Championships in different age groups, where she won five medals: three gold (in 2013, European Youth Ch.ship, under-12 girls group, in 2018, World Youth Ch.ship, under-18 girls group, and in 2019, World Youth Ch.ship, under-18 girls group), silver (in 2017, World Youth Ch.ship, under-16 girls group) and bronze (in 2016, World Youth Ch.ship, under-16 girls group).

In April 2016, she won the Moscow Women's Chess Championship. In December 2017, in Saint Petersburg Shuvalova made her debut in the Russian Women's Chess Championship Superfinal in which she shared 7th-9th place with Marina Nechaeva and Oksana Gritsayeva. The tournament was won by Aleksandra Goryachkina. In April 2018, she shared 2nd-8th in the European Women's Chess Championship in Vysoke Tatry, Slovakia and earned a spot in the 2020 Women's World Cup. In September 2018, she took 8th place in the Russian Women's Chess Championship Superfinal in Satka.

In October 2019, Shuvalova won the 2019 World Under 18 Girls' Championship in Mumbai, India with a score of 8.5/11. Shortly after, she won the World Girls' Junior Championship in New Delhi with a score of 9.5/11 and was awarded the Woman Grandmaster (WGM) title.

In 2020, FIDE awarded her the International Master (IM) title. In November, she won the 2020 Russian Women's Team Championship, where she played on the first board for the Moscow Chess Federation team. In December, Shuvalova tied for first place in the Russian Women Superfinal in Moscow with Aleksandra Goryachkina. They played a Rapid tie break which Shuvalova lost and she became the Vice Russia Women Chess Champion.

In October 2023, Shuvalova won the Chess.com I'M Not A GM Speed Chess Championship, after defeating Levy Rozman, becoming the first woman to win the event.

In February 2026, Shuvalova reached rating of 2941 on Chess.com, setting a new all-time blitz rating record by a woman. In July 2026, she finished second in the Oskemen Masters 2026, she got her second GM Norm with a performance rating of 2682.
