= Mahindra Satyam =

Indian company

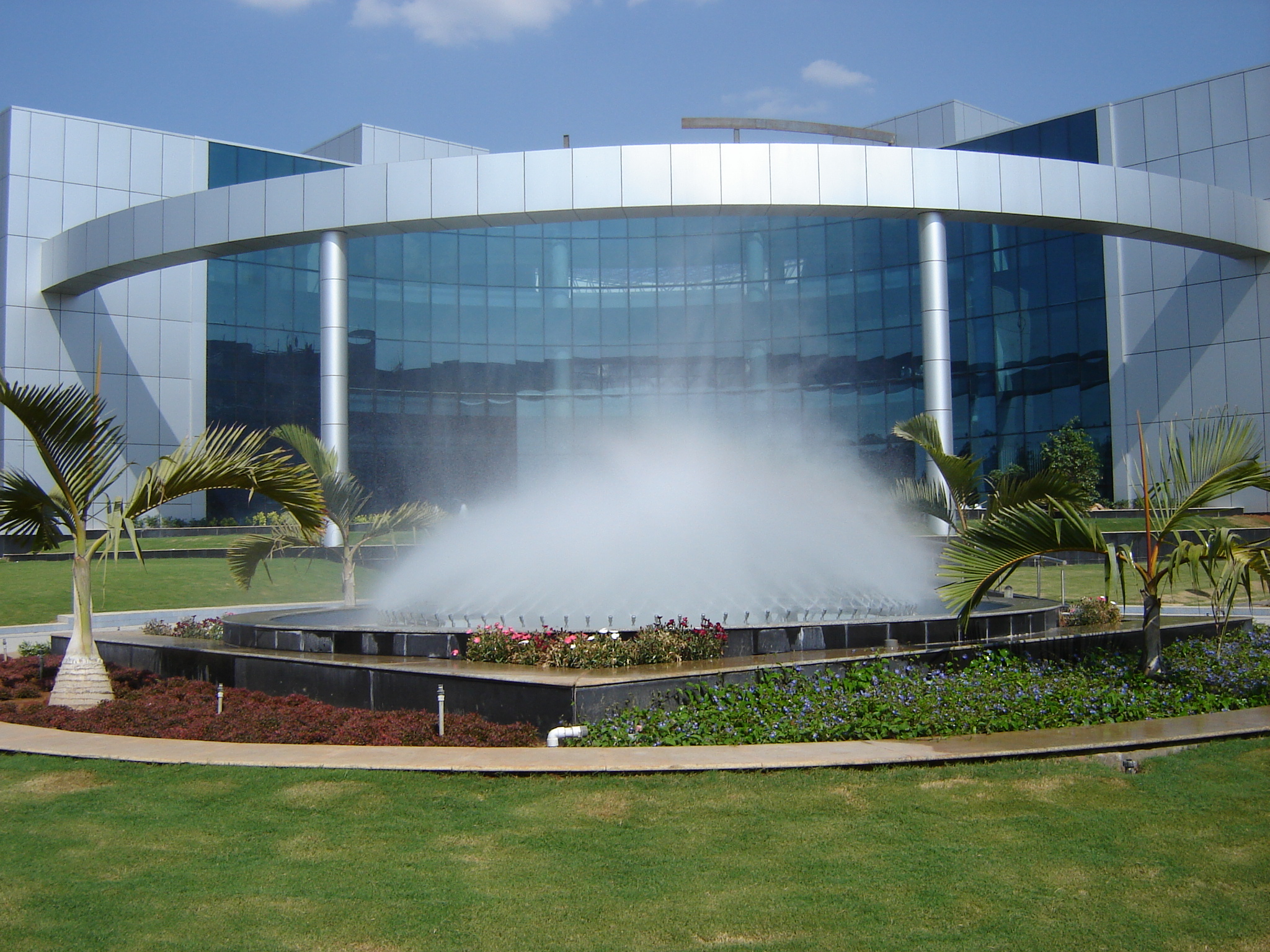
- Type: Public company
- Industry: IT services, IT consulting
- Founded: 1987
- Defunct: 2013
- Fate: Merged into Tech Mahindra
- Successor: Tech Mahindra
- Headquarters: Hyderabad, India
- Services: IT, business consulting and outsourcing services

Mahindra Satyam (formerly Satyam Computer Services Limited) was an Indian information technology (IT) services company based in Hyderabad, India, offering software development, system maintenance, packaged software integration and engineering design services. Satyam Computer Services was listed on the Pink Sheets, the National Stock Exchange and Bombay Stock Exchange and provided services to a wide range of customers including 185 Fortune 500 companies.

In January 2009, the company's founder and chairman Ramalinga Raju admitted to inflating the company's assets by $1 billion, leading to criminal charges and a collapse of the company's stock price. This was known as the Satyam Scandal. Mahindra Group's IT arm, Tech Mahindra, purchased a major stake in the company and in June 2009 the company renamed itself Mahindra Satyam. Mahindra Satyam merged with Tech Mahindra on 24 June 2013.

== History ==
Satyam Computer Services was founded in 1987 and by 2008 earned revenues of over $2 billion, employing 52,000 IT professionals across the world. It was one of India's five top IT companies, and focused on the enterprise segment. It had an extensive client list including 185 Fortune 500 companies. The company was the subject of what was called India's biggest corporate scandal in January 2009 when then-chairman Byrraju Ramalinga Raju admitted in a letter to the Securities and Exchange Board of India that the corporate accounts had been falsified, adding approximately $1 billion to the company's cash and cash-related assets. The government appointed a board to oversee the sale of the company. Tech Mahindra offered to purchase a majority stake in April 2009, and the company was rebranded as Mahindra Satyam in June 2009.

Tech Mahindra announced its plan to merge with Mahindra Satyam on 21 March 2012, after the boards of both companies gave their approval. The Bombay Stock Exchange, the National Stock Exchange, and the Competition Commission of India (CCI) also approved. Shareholders unanimously approved the move in January 2013. The merger ran into delays due to ambiguity over jurisdiction between investigating agencies and the government, and two tax cases totaling over ₹ 27 billion. On 11 June 2013 Andhra Pradesh High Court approved the merger, after the Bombay high court gave its approval.

A new management structure was announced for the new entity, led by Anand Mahindra as Chairman, Vineet Nayyar as Vice Chairman and C. P. Gurnani as the CEO and Managing Director. The merger was announced to be complete on 25 June 2013, creating India's fifth largest software services company with a turnover of US$2.7 billion. Mahindra Satyam shareholders received two shares of Tech Mahindra stock for every 17 shares of Mahindra Satyam stock they owned. Shares in the new entity began trading on 12 July 2013.

On 24 July 2013, a division bench of Andhra Pradesh High Court admitted a petition filed by Ekadanta Greenfields and Saptaswara Agro Farms challenging the Mahindra Satyam-Tech Mahindra merger order. The two firms argued that their objections to the merger had not been considered in full.

=== Finances ===
After the scandal hit, the company's revenue collapsed and the new chairman, Vineet Nayyar, suggested that a turnaround would take three years. By the April–June quarter of 2011, the company was profitable once again. In 2013 Mahindra Satyam declared a 30% dividend. Nayyar commented "The turnaround of Mahindra Satyam is symbolically and practically complete. The merger (with Tech Mahindra), which is in its penultimate phase, will open a new chapter for the company. We thank all stakeholders for supporting us during this crucial phase".

== Controversies ==
=== Tax evasion ===
Before the asset inflation scandal hit, the Income Tax Department had issued notices to the company seeking ₹ 6.17 billion tax, for the assessment years from 2003–04 to 2008–09 after disallowing exemptions claimed by the software firm. The Central Board of Direct Taxes attached the properties of Mahindra Satyam on 30 January 2012, after issuing notices to the company seeking payment of the tax. The Andhra Pradesh High Court stayed the order in February 2012.

=== Maytas acquisition ===
In December 2008, Satyam founder B. Ramalinga Raju made a final attempt to conceal his falsification of the Satyam Computer Services balance sheets by acquiring Maytas Infrastructure and Maytas Properties for $1.6 billion, despite concerns raised by independent directors. Both companies were founded by Raju's family members (Maytas is "Satyam" reversed) and were owned by Raju's sons. This eventually led to a review of the deal by the government, and a veiled criticism by the then Vice President of India Hamid Ansari. Several of Satyam's clients responded by re-evaluating their relationship with the company. Satyam's investors lost about ₹3,300 crore (equivalent to ₹100 billion or US$1.1 billion in 2026) in the related panic selling, as Satyam's shares fell 55% on the New York Stock Exchange. Four members of the board of directors resigned on 29 December 2008.

=== Accounting scandal ===
On 7 January 2009, Chairman Raju resigned after publicly announcing his involvement in a massive accounting fraud, in which he had inflated the company's cash assets by over $1 billion. In a letter to the Securities and Exchange Board of India, he explained that "what started as a marginal gap between actual operating profit and the one reflected in the books of accounts continued to grow over the years ... It has attained unmanageable proportions as the size of the company operations grew significantly".

In 2015, Raju was sentenced to seven years in jail and fined about $800,000.

== See also ==
- Patni Computer Systems
- IGATE
- Capgemini
