= Tech Mahindra =

Indian multinational technology company

- Formerly: Mahindra British Telecom (1986–2006)
- Type: Public
- Traded as: BSE: 532755; NSE: TECHM; BSE SENSEX constituent; NSE NIFTY 50 constituent
- ISIN: INE669C01036
- Industry: Information technology Consulting; Outsourcing
- Founded: 24 October 1986; 40 years ago
- Founder: Anand Mahindra
- Headquarters: Pune, Maharashtra, India
- Area served: Worldwide
- Key people: Anand Mahindra (Chairman); Mohit Joshi (MD & CEO)
- Revenue: ▲₹56,815 crore (US$5.9 billion) (2026)
- Operating income: ▲₹7,152 crore (US$740 million) (2026)
- Net income: ▲₹4,811 crore (US$500 million) (2026)
- Total assets: ▲₹49,369 crore (US$5.1 billion) (2026)
- Total equity: ▲₹30,077 crore (US$3.1 billion) (2026)
- Number of employees: 147,623 (2026)
- Parent: Mahindra Group
- Website: www.techmahindra.com
- Footnotes; Financials as of 31 March 2026.

Tech Mahindra is an Indian multinational information technology services and consulting company. It was formed in 1986 as a joint venture between Mahindra & Mahindra and BT Group. Part of the Mahindra Group, the company is headquartered in Pune and has its registered office in Mumbai.

== History ==
In 1986, Mahindra & Mahindra started a 60:40 joint venture technology services outsourcing firm with British Telecom named Mahindra British Telecom (MBT). In 2000, British Telecom committed business of at least £105 million over three years; as a consideration, British Telecom's stake in MBT increased to 43%. MBT primarily served the telecommunications industry in its early years, with British Telecom as its largest client.

In 2006, MBT was renamed as Tech Mahindra, and it became a publicly-listed company via an initial public offering. In December 2010, British Telecom sold 5.5% of its stake in Tech Mahindra to Mahindra & Mahindra for ₹451 crore. In August 2012, British Telecom sold 14.1% of its stake to institutional investors for about ₹1,395 crore. In December 2012, British Telecom sold its remaining 9.1% stake to institutional investors for ₹1,011.4 crore. This sale marked the exit of British Telecom from Tech Mahindra.

=== Acquisition and merger of Satyam ===
In the aftermath of the Satyam scandal, Tech Mahindra emerged as the top bidder for a 31% controlling stake in Satyam Computer Services, beating a bid from Larsen & Toubro, in April 2009. After the completion of the acquisition, Satyam Computer Services was renamed Mahindra Satyam in June 2009. Tech Mahindra's stake in Satyam increased to 42% through a preferential share allotment in July 2009.

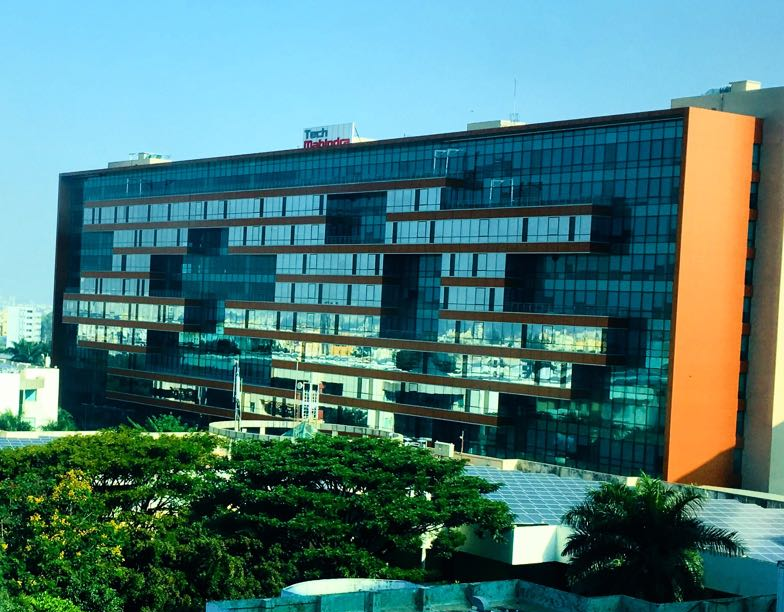
A building in the Bangalore campus of Tech Mahindra c. 2017

In 2010, Mahindra Satyam and Morpho were awarded a contract by UIDAI to implement the biometric identification system for the Aadhaar programme. Mahindra Satyam, along with Tech Mahindra, was the official IT services provider for the 2010 and 2014 FIFA World Cups.

Tech Mahindra announced its merger with Mahindra Satyam on 21 March 2012, after getting approval of the two company boards. The new organization would be led by Anand Mahindra as Chairman, Vineet Nayyar as Vice Chairman, and C. P. Gurnani as the CEO and Managing Director. On 25 June 2013, Tech Mahindra completed the merger to become India's fifth largest software services company with a turnover of $2.7 billion. The merger diversified Tech Mahindra's revenue mix, with the telecommunication vertical's share declining from over 90% in 2009 to 47% in 2013.

=== Later years ===
In 2013, Mahindra Group company Mahindra Engineering Services (MES) merged with Tech Mahindra. In 2015, Tech Mahindra and Mahindra & Mahindra (M&M) jointly purchased a controlling stake in Pininfarina S.p.A., an Italian automotive and industrial design company. By March 2016, Tech Mahindra's post-tax earnings had surpassed that of M&M. Tech Mahindra was ranked 5th among India's IT firms and overall 47th on the Fortune India 500 list for 2019. Since 2023, Tech Mahindra and FIDE have organized the Global Chess League, an over-the-board rapid chess league. In 2025, Tech Mahindra was one of the eight entities selected by the IndiaAI Mission to develop a sovereign foundation LLM.

== Acquisitions ==
Notable acquisitions by Tech Mahindra include:

Year	Company	Country	Industry	Acquisition cost
2005	Axes Technologies	United States	Telecom engineering	$54 million
2007	iPolicy Networks	United States	Network security	Undisclosed
2009-13	Satyam Computer Services	India	IT services	$600 million
2012	Hutchinson Global Services	United States	Business process outsourcing	$87 million
2012	Comviva	India	Telecom VAS	$48 million
2014	Lightbridge Communications Corporation (LCC)	United States	Telecom network services	$240 million
2015	SOFGEN Holdings	Switzerland	Banking technology consulting	Undisclosed
2015	Pininfarina	Italy	Automotive design engineering	€168 million
2016	Target Group	United Kingdom	Business process outsourcing	£120 million
2016	The Bio Agency	United Kingdom	Digital consulting	£45 million
2017	HCI Group (CJS Solutions Group)	United States	Healthcare technology	$89.5 million
2019	Mad*Pow	United States	Design strategy agency	unknown
2019	BORN Group	United States	Content agency	$90 million
2020	Zen3 Infosolutions	United States	Enterprise software	$64 million
2020	Cerium Systems	India	IC and embedded software	$32.1 million
2020	Tenzing Group	New Zealand	Management consulting	$29.5 million
2021	Perigord	Ireland	Digital services	€21 million
2021	DigitalOnUs	United States	Cloud and DevOps services	$120 million
2021	Eventus Solutions Group	United States	CX consulting	$44 million
2021	Brainscale	United States	Cloud consulting	$28.8 million
2021	Lodestone (Infostar)	United States	Product engineering	$105 million
2021	Activus Connect	United States	CX technology	$62 million
2021	Allyis Group	United States	IT consulting	$125 million
2022	Com Tec Co (CTC)	Cyprus	IT consulting	€310 million
2022	Thirdware	India	Enterprise software	$42 million

== Operations ==
For the year ended March 2025, the company derived 85.9% of its revenue from IT consulting, software application development and maintenance services, and the remaining 14.1% from business process services and outsourcing.

== Financials ==
Year	Revenue (In crores)	Profits/Loss (In crores)	Ref.
2021	37,885	4,351	
2022	▲44,646	▲5,627	
2023	▲53,290	▼4,886	
2024	▼51,995	▼2,386	
2025	▲52,988	▲4,244	

== See also ==
- Big Tech (India)
- List of Indian IT companies
- Fortune India 500
- Software industry in Telangana
