= Uttar Pradesh Lokayukta =

Anti-corruption Ombudsman for the state of Uttar Pradesh

Lokayukta Uttar Pradesh
- Incumbent; Sanjay Mishra
- Government of Uttar Pradesh
- Reports to: Chief Minister of Uttar Pradesh; Governor of Uttar Pradesh
- Seat: Lok Ayukta, Uttar Pradesh, TC-46/V-1, Vibhuti Khand, Gomti Nagar, Lucknow
- Appointer: Governor of Uttar Pradesh
- Term length: 5 years
- Inaugural holder: Vishambar Dayal
- Formation: 14 September 1977; 49 years ago
- Website: Lokayukta Office

Uttar Pradesh Lokayukta and Uplokayukta (Sanskrit: उत्तर प्रदेश लोकायुक्त and उपलोकायुक्त) is an anti-corruption ombudsman in the Indian state of Uttar Pradesh. The position of the Lokayukta was established under the Lokayukta Act of 1975. The Lokayukta is from a non-political background and functions as a statutory authority probing into cases primarily related to corruption, government mismanagement, or abuse of power by public servants or ministers. Though the Lokayukta lacks wide investigatory powers, it has caught public attention by investigating high-profile cases.

On 28 January 2016, the Supreme Court of India recalled its previous order and appointed a new Lokayukta for Uttar Pradesh after the state government failed to suggest one.

उत्तर प्रदेश लोक आयुक्त का कार्यकाल,उत्तर प्रदेश लोक आयुक्त एवं उप-लोक आयुक्त (संशोधन), ACT 2024 के तहत 8 वर्ष से घटाकर 5 वर्ष कर दिया गया है ।

== Selection procedure ==
According to the Uttar Pradesh Lokayukta and UpLokayukta Act of 1975, the Governor of the state can appoint a person to be the Lokayukta and one or more persons as uplokayukta(s)(Deputy Lokayukta). The Lokayukta's appointment is made after consultations with the Chief Justice of the Allahabad High Court, and the leader of the opposition in the state assembly.The Uplokayukta(s) can be appointed after consulting the Lokayukta.

A person is eligible for the post of the Lokayukta or Uplokayukta if he/she fulfills the following criteria.

- A judge of the Supreme Court or the High Court.
- Never held an office of member of Parliament or severed their connection with it.
- Never held an office of State Legislature.
- Holding no office of trust or profit, or severed their connection with the business or profession if had joined in the past.

Under the Uttar Pradesh Lokayukta and Up-Lokayukta (Amendment) Bill, 2024, the tenure of the lokayukta and the up-lokayukta has been reduced from eight years to five years and the maximum age has been increased to 70 years.s. The perks and allowances of the Lokayukta are the same as that of the chief justice while that of an Uplokayukta to a judge of the state's High court. The institution of Lokayukta should have Judicial and Non-Judicial members.

== Roles and responsibilities ==
"The functioning of the Uttar Pradesh Lokayukta is to initiate inquiries on complaints regarding maladministration and corruption concerning a State Public Servant". The investigation can be started with specific approval of the concerned ministry and can be either a Grievance or Allegation. Grievance means any claim by a person who faced injustice or undue hardship due to maladministration, whereas, allegation is in relation to a public servant, any government company or corporation in the state or pension and other claims.

Lokayukta or an Uplokayukta enjoys the same powers as that of a civil court under the code of Civil Procedure, 1908 which includes summoning the person, checking any public record or request copy from any court or office and issuing commissions for the examination of witnesses or documents. The lokayukta is also required to ensure the safe custody of relevant documents. Every investigation is conducted in private, and the identity of the complainant and that of the public servant under investigation not disclosed in any form unless it is related to public importance. After the completion of an investigation, the lokayukta is required to submit the report to the governor.

In case of a false complaint, the lokayukta is empowered to take appropriate action as specified under Code of Criminal Procedure, 1973, which may involve detention of the complainant and up to three years of imprisonment with fine. However, the person can make an appeal which can be admitted only by the session court. However, in any such case, the court cannot compel the lokayukta, uplokayukta or any public servant to furnish any evidence recorded or collected.

The State Government, by a notification published in the gazette, can confer additional powers for specific investigations to the office of the Lokayukta and can even allow them to make new rules for the same.

== Recommendations ==
Many names were suggested for selecting a new Lokayukta after the term of N.K. Mehrotra expired. Despite objections raised by both, the chief justice of the Allahabad High Court and the governor, the state government forwarded the name of retired judge Ravindra Singh to the governor at least four times, without following the due procedure. The chief justice had raised strong objections citing Ravindra Singh's alleged political affiliations with the ruling government of the samajwadi party. The government headed by Akhilesh Yadav neither proposed a fresh name, nor called a meeting of the selection committee regarding the appointment, which led to governor Ram Naik rejecting the name of Singh for a fifth time in August 2015. The state government passed an amendment in the state assembly on 28 August 2015, removing the clause that required the chief justice of the Allahabad High Court to be a part of the selection committee.; The bill, however lies pending with the governor (Note: "The governor is right when he insists on the evidence of the state government having consulted the chief justice of the Allahabad high court and the leader of the Opposition," an expert said. The state government’s plea that the governor is always bound to go by the ministerial advice does not hold water too, experts said. "The governor has all the right to reject what the minister’s have advised," the expert added.)

=== Hearings in the Supreme Court ===
Multiples hearings occurred in the Supreme Court for appointing a new lokayukta. On 2 July 2015, the Court sought the response of the Uttar Pradesh government on a plea seeking replacement of the state's current lokayukta N.K. Mehrotra, The Allahabad High Court also sought response for the same from the government on 23 July 2015. The apex court issued a notice to the government in December, regarding the initiation of contempt proceedings against it for non-compliance of the Court's previous order. On receiving no reply from the government, the supreme court, on 14 December, criticized the for not appointing a new lokayukta in the state and fixed the petitions on the issue for a hearing on 16 December. The Supreme Court had earlier upheld constitutional validity of extending tenure of lokayukta to eight years on 24 April 2014 and had asked for the list of possible appointees within six months. Since the government failed to recommend the list within the time-frame, the Court appointed Virendra Singh as the new lokayukta by exercising its constitutional power under Article 142 of the Constitution The court, however retracted this decision later, after hearing a plea and appointed former judge of Allahabad High Court Sanjay Mishra as the new lokayukta in January 2016.

== Appointment ==
The former Lokayukta N.K. Mehrotra was appointed on 16 March 2006 under the Uttar Pradesh Lokayukta Act. After his term expired on 15 March 2012, the Uttar Pradesh government on the same day brought an ordinance and another on 18 March and extended the period from existing six to eight years, which was later upheld by the Supreme Court.

On 31 July 2012, the state government cabinet approved to keep the office of lokayukta out of the purview of the RTI Act, 2005 citing secrecy while investigating corruption charges. N.K. Mehrotra served nine years in the office, the longest term by a lokayukta in the country. On 16 December 2015, the Supreme Court, invoking its constitutional powers, appointed justice Virendra Singh as the new Lokayukta, while expressing deep regret for constitutional authorities failing to comply with the court's order.

Following objection to Justice Singh's appointment, on 28 January 2016, the Supreme Court retracted its decision and appointed former judge Sanjay Mishra to the office .

Lokayukta(s) of Uttar Pradesh.

No (Note: A number inside brackets indicates that the incumbent has previously held office.)	Name	Term (tenure length)		
1	Vishambar Dayal	14 September 1977	13 September 1982	1826 days
2	Vacant	14 September 1982	9 January 1983	118 days
3	Mirza Mohammad Murtza Hussain	10 January 1983	10 January 1989	2193 days
4	Vacant	11 January 1989	27 January 1989	17 days
5	Kailash Nath Goyal	28 January 1989	28 January 1995	2192 days
6	Vacant	29 January 1995	8 February 1995	11 days
7	Rajeshwar Singh	9 February 1995	13 January 2000	1800 days
8	Vacant	14 January 2000	15 March 2000	62 days
9	Sudhir Chandra Verma	16 March 2000	15 March 2006	2191 days
10	N.K. Mehrotra	16 March 2006	30 January 2016	3607 days
11	Sanjay Mishra	31 January 2016	Incumbent	3891 days

== Notable cases ==
The state lokayukta has probed many high-profile cases and some of them are mentioned below.

- Submitted report on the alleged nexus between Ponty Chadha and government headed by Mayawati.
- Recommended CBI investigation against prominent BSP leader Naseemuddin Siddiqui for allegedly amassing disproportionate assets.
- Investigated assets case against state mining minister Gayatri Prasad Prajapati.
- On 29 January 2015, two MLA's of the state assembly were disqualified by the governor on recommendation of lokayukta which indicted them for irregularities.
- The lokayukta acquitted Noida based engineer Yadav Singh, despite him being investigated by the CBI for allegedly amassing huge wealth.

== Limitations of Powers ==
The lokayukta cannot act on any complaint pertaining to people occupying following constitutional posts.

- The Chief Justice or any judge of the High court or member of judicial services.
- Officer or servant of any court.
- The Accountant General, Uttar pradesh.
- Chairman or any member of the Uttar pradesh Public Service Commission or its staff.
- The Chief Election Commissioner, the Election Commissioner, the Regional Commissioner and the Chief Electoral Officer, Uttar Pradesh.
- Any member of the secretariat staff of either House of the state legislature.

If the investigation involves internal security of the state or the disclosure of proceedings of the cabinet of the state government or any committee of that cabinet, then the person cannot be compelled to give any evidence or produce any document. The state government after consultation with the lokayukta, in view of public interest, may exempt a public servant from investigation via notification in the state gazette .

The following matters cannot be covered in the investigation conducted by the lokayukta.

- Investigations related to crime.
- Proceedings relating to the internal security of the state.
- Actions in relation to determining whether a matter will go or will continue to be prosecuted in a court.
- Action concerning commercial relations of the administration of the government or of the local authority or other corporations, except where the complainant alleged harassment in meeting contractual obligations.
- Appointments related to removal, pay, disciplinary action, superannuation or other matters relating to conditions of services of public servants but not including actions relating to claims for pension, gratuity, provident fund or to any claims which arises on retirement, removal or termination of service.
- Grant of honors and awards. If this is done in a confidential manner, an investigation cell may be established under the Lokayukta.

== Removal ==
According to the Article 311 of the constitution, the lokayukta or an up-lokayukta can be removed only if found guilty in the report of committee headed by the judge of either Supreme court or Chief justice of the High court. The report is then forwarded to the Governor and then presented before the state legislature with each house of the legislature votes for the removal by 2/3 majority.

== See also ==
- Lokayukta
- Lokpal
- The Lokpal and Lokayuktas Act, 2013
- Maharashtra Lokayukta
- Karnataka Lokayukta
- Goa Lokayukta
- Andhra Pradesh Lokayukta
- Assam Lokayukta
- Telangana Lokayukta
- Delhi Lokayukta
- Himachal Pradesh Lokayukta
- Bihar Lokayukta
- West Bengal Lokayukta
- Haryana Lokayukta
- Chhattisgarh Lokayog
