= Punjab Lokayukta =

Parliamentary Ombudsman for the state of Punjab

Punjab LOKAYUKTA

Agency overview
- Formed: 1996

Jurisdictional structure
- Federal agency: India
- Operations jurisdiction: India
- General nature: Federal law enforcement

Operational structure
- Agency executive: Justice Vinod Kumar Sharma., Lokayukta

Punjab Lokayukta is the Parliamentary Ombudsman for the Indian state of Punjab. It is a high-level statutory functionary, created to address grievances of the public against ministers, legislators, administration and public servants in issues related to misuse of power, mal-administration and corruption. It was first formed under the Punjab Lokpal Act-1996, and approved by the president of India. The Lokpal and Lokayuktas Act, 2013 adopted by Parliament had come into force from 16 January 2014 and required each state in India to appoint its Lokayukta within a year. The law mandated that a bench of Lokayukta should consist of judicial and non-judicial members. An Upa-Lokayukta is a deputy to the Lokayukta and assists in her or his work and acts as the in-charge Lokayukta in case the position falls vacant before time.

A Lokayukta of the state is appointed to office by the state Governor after consulting the committee consisting of State Chief Minister, Speaker of Legislative Assembly, Leader of Opposition, or leader of largest opposition party in State Legislature, Chairman of Legislative Council and Leader of Opposition of Legislative Council and cannot be removed from office except for reasons specified in the Act and will serve the period of five years.

== History and administration ==
Punjab Lokayukta Bill 2020 was introduced and passed by Punjab Council of Ministers headed by state Chief Minister Amarinder Singh. The new bill will replace the current Punjab Lokpal Act, 1996. The revised bill has been drafted to enhance the efficiency of governanace and prevent corruption. The institution which has powers of civil code under Code of Civil Procedure,1908 had been created as autonomous body and will enquire any complaint of corruption or abuse of office against Public functionaries. Any person filing false complaints under it will be prosecuted. However, sanctioning of prosecution against Chief Minister, Ministers and MLA's can be possible after 2/3rd members in State Assembly present and vote in favour of it. Additionally, Lokayukta will be bound by sanctions approved in State Assembly irrespective of permission for prosecution had been granted or not. A screening committee of institution will scrutinise the complaints received by it and take State Government opinion before issuing notice.

The revised bill does not favour a parallel probe into the same complaint by any other agency against the Government or Public official if Lokpal is conducting an investigation of the same. Additionally if the Government is investigating any complaint the same case can't be handled by Lokayukta. The bill provides for a Lokpal to be a serving or retired judge of High Court or Supreme Court as Chairperson. State Government can appoint more than four persons with undisputable reputation who are qualified to be members, provided one among them is either women or from minorities or scheduled castes or from the backward classes.

== Oath or affirmation ==
"I, <name>, having been appointed Lokayukta (or Upa-Lokayukta) do swear in the name of God (or solemnly affirm) that I will bear faith and allegiance to the Constitution of India as by law established and I will duly and faithfully and to the best of my ability, knowledge and judgment perform the duties of my office without fear or favour, affection or ill-will."

— First Schedule, Punjab Lokpal Act-1996

== Powers ==
Punjab Lokayukta has complete and exclusive authority for enquiring into allegations or complaints against the State Chief Minister, State Deputy Chief Minister, Ministers of the state Government, Mayors of cities, Leader of Opposition, non-officials and Government officials. The institution has powers to investigate and prosecute any government official or public servants who are covered by the act and abuses his authority for his self-interest or causes hurt to anyone or any action done intentionally or following corrupt practices negatively impacting the state or individual.

== Appointment and tenure ==
Punjab Lokayukta is Justice Vinod Kumar Sharma who will head the anti-corruption organisation in the state with a term of six years from 9 October 2019 or reaching of the age of 70 years, whichever is earlier. He retired as a judge of Punjab and Haryana High Court. The post was vacant for two years from 23 April 2018 after the previous Lokpal after the resignation of Justice Satish Kumar Mittal. Punjab Lokayukta Chairperson will be appointed by Governor along with other members who are recommended by a committee headed by Chief Minister and other members being Speaker of Assembly and Opposition Leader in Assembly, or elected leader of the largest opposition party in the Assembly, a person who is prominent jurist recommended by State Government and Chief Justice of Punjab and Haryana High Court.

== Notable cases ==
In 2021, Punjab Lokayukta on a complaint filed ordered an enquiry in a case relating to the illegal occupation of 12 acres of land in Kapurthala District worth Rs 100 crores by SGPC former president Bibi Jagir Kaur.

== See also ==
- Lokpal and Lokayukta Act 2013
- Goa Lokayukta
- Karnataka Lokayukta
- Haryana Lokayukta
- Uttar Pradesh Lokayukta
- Delhi Lokayukta
