= Arunachal Pradesh Lokayukta =

Agency overview
- Formed: 2014

Jurisdictional structure
- Federal agency: India
- Operations jurisdiction: India
- General nature: Federal law enforcement

Operational structure
- Headquarters: Address: Golden Jubilee Banquet Hall, Itanagar, Anachal Pradesh - 791110.
- Agency executive: Hon’ble Shri Justice Prasanta Kumar Saikia., Lokayukta

Arunachal Pradesh Lokayukta is the Parliamentary Ombudsman for the state of Arunachal Pradesh (India). It is a high level statutory functionary, created to address grievances of the public against ministers, legislators, administration and public servants in issues related to misuse of power, mal-administration and corruption. It was first formed under the Arunachal Pradesh Lokayukta and Deputy Lokayukta Act-2014 and approved by the president of India. The Lokpal and Lokayuktas Act, 2013 adopted by Parliament had become law from 16 January 2014 and required each state to appoint its Lokayukta within a year. A bench of Lokayukta should consist of judicial and non-judicial members. An Upa-Lokayukta is a deputy to the Lokayukta and assists in her or his work and acts as the in-charge Lokayukta in case the position falls vacant before time.

A Lokayukta of the state is appointed to office by the state Governor after consulting the committee consisting of State Chief Minister, Speaker of Legislative Assembly, Leader of Opposition, or leader of largest opposition party in State Legislature, Chairman of Legislative Council and Leader of Opposition of Legislative Council and cannot be removed from office except for reasons specified in the Act and will serve the period of five years.

== History and administration ==
Arunachal Pradesh Lokayukta Act-2014 was passed in the Arunachal Pradesh Assembly and was effective from 4 March 2014. Lokayukta office in the state is located at Golden Jubilee Banquet Hall, Itanagar. The Lokayukta bench of the state should have a Chairperson serving as Chief Justice of High Court or Judge of Supreme Court, and two members, one being Schedule Tribe from state as Judicial member and other being a woman member. The bill for amendment of State Lokayukta was passed in 2019.

== Oath or affirmation ==
"I, <name>, having been appointed Lokayukta (or Upa-Lokayukta) do swear in the name of God (or solemnly affirm) that I will bear faith and allegiance to the Constitution of India as by law established and I will duly and faithfully and to the best of my ability, knowledge and judgment perform the duties of my office without fear or favour, affection or ill-will."

— First Schedule, Arunachal Pradesh Lokayukta and Deputy Lokayukta Act-2014

== Powers ==
Arunachal Pradesh Lokayukta has complete and exclusive authority for enquiring into allegations or complaints against the State Chief Minister, State Deputy Chief Minister, Ministers of the state Government, Leader of Opposition and Government officials. Lokayukta Act of the state which serves as its tool against corruption covers Chief Ministers, ex-Chief Ministers, NGOs, Government officials, Ministers and all public servants.

== Appointment and tenure ==
First Lokayukta of Arunachal Pradesh is Justice Prasanta Kumar Saikia being appointed on 27 June 2019 and member of Lokayukta is former IAS officer Yeshi Tsering and will have a term of five years or reaching of the age of 70 years, whichever is earlier.

== See also ==
- Lokpal and Lokayukta Act,2013
- Uttar Pradesh Lokayukta
- Andhra Pradesh Lokayukta
- Delhi Lokayukta
- Himachal Pradesh Lokayukta
