= Odisha Lokayukta =

Parliamentary Ombudsman

Odisha

Agency overview
- Formed: 2014

Jurisdictional structure
- Federal agency: India
- Operations jurisdiction: India
- General nature: Federal law enforcement

Operational structure
- Headquarters: Odisha Lokayukta, OFFICE OF THE LOKAYUKTA, ODISHA, B-2, Ground Floor, Toshali Bhawan, Satyanagar, Bhubaneswar-751007
- Agency executive: Hon’ble Shri Justice Ajit Singh., Chairperson

Odisha Lokayukta is the Parliamentary Ombudsman for the state of Odisha (India). It is a high level statutory functionary, created to address grievances of the public against ministers, legislators, administration and public servants in issues related to misuse of power, mal-administration and corruption. It was first formed under the Odisha Lokayukta and Deputy Lokayukta Act, and approved by the president of India. The Lokpal and Lokayuktas Act, 2013 adopted by the Parliamentof India had come into force as a law from 16 January 2014 and required each state in India to appoint its Lokayukta within a year. The law demanded that a bench of Lokayukta should consist of judicial and non-judicial members. An Upa-Lokayukta is a deputy to the Lokayukta and assists in her or his work and acts as the in-charge Lokayukta in case the position falls vacant prematurely.

A Lokayukta of the state is appointed to office by the state Governor after consulting the committee consisting of State Chief Minister, Speaker of Legislative Assembly, Leader of Opposition, Chairman of Legislative Council and Leader of Opposition of Legislative Council and cannot be removed from office except for reasons specified in the Act and will serve the period of five years.

== History and administration ==
Odisha Lokayukta Act-2014 was passed in February 2014 making it the first state to pass the law after Central Government passed the Bill, and got President's approval in January 2015. The Act was passed for the formation of a 6-member anti-corruption panel to look into allegation of corruption and other abuse of power by Chief Minister, ex-Chief Ministers, other ministers under him and public functionaries and influential officials as per the Act. The act replaces the Odisha Lokpal and Lokayukta Act, 1995. As per the Indian Penal code all the proceedings before Lokayukta are considered as judicial proceedings.

Odisha Lokayukta Act prohibits disclosure of the identity of the complainant and the functionary against whom the complaint is filed during proceedings before it. The Act lays down for the electronically filed complaint to be filed in hard copy within 15 days of the date of complaint filed by the complainant. As per the Act protection is given for the integrity of the investigation process and to the complainant but not be liable in case the person discloses himself. According to the Act the complaint will be made void in case it is not related to public functionary or the content has ambiguity or fraud or is not related to the purpose mentioned therein. However the Lokayukta can continue with enquiry or investigation if he finds purpose in the complaint and the same is mentioned in the Act. Additionally if after commencement of investigation he finds the grounds are insufficient, he can discontinue the investigation. The office of Lokayukta has the facility of filing complaints online.

== Oath or affirmation ==
"I, <name>, having been appointed Lokayukta (or Upa-Lokayukta) do swear in the name of God (or solemnly affirm) that I will bear faith and allegiance to the Constitution of India as by law established and I will duly and faithfully and to the best of my ability, knowledge and judgment perform the duties of my office without fear or favour, affection or ill-will."

— First Schedule, Odisha Lokayukta and Deputy Lokayukta Act-2013

== Powers ==
Odisha Lokayukta has complete and exclusive authority for enquiring into allegations or complaints against the State Chief Minister, State Deputy Chief Minister, Ministers of the state Government, Leader of Opposition and Government officials.

== Appointment and tenure ==
First Lokayukta of Odisha is Justice Ajit Singh, a former Chief Justice of Gauhati High Court.

== Notable cases ==
Orissa Lokayukta in the year 2020 got total registered cases of 272 and out of it resolved 56 of them. 29 cumulative complaints of earlier Lokpals are pending to resolve and around 1223 personal issues are transferred to State Government under the Act.

Orissa Lokayukta in the year 2019 got total registered cases of 1418 and out of it resolved 166 of them.

In the year 2020, Orissa Lokayukta conducted investigations on a complaint relating to corruption in the purchase of masks and PPE (personal protective equipment) for the treatment of COVID-19 patients.

== See also ==
- Lokpal and Lokayukta Act 2013
- West Bengal Lokayukta
- Tamilnadu Lokayukta
- Jharkhand Lokayukta
- Chhattisgarh Lokayog
