= Rajasthan Lokayukta =

Parliamentary Ombudsman

Agency overview
- Formed: 1973

Jurisdictional structure
- Federal agency: India
- Operations jurisdiction: India
- General nature: Federal law enforcement

Operational structure
- Headquarters: Rajasthan Lokayukta, Lokayukta Secretariat Rajasthan, Government Secretariat Complex, Jaipur-302005.
- Agency executive: Hon’ble Shri Justice Shri Pratap Krishna Lohra., Chairperson

Website
- lokayukta.rajasthan.gov.in

Rajasthan Lokayukta is the Parliamentary Ombudsman for the state of Rajasthan (India). It is a high level statutory functionary, created to address grievances of the public against ministers, legislators, administration and public servants in issues related to misuse of power, mal-administration and corruption. It was first formed under the Rajasthan Lokayukta and Deputy Lokayukta Act, and approved by the president of India. The Lokpal and Lokayuktas Act, 2013 adopted by Parliament had come into force from 16 January 2014, requiring each Indian state to appoint its Lokayukta within a year. According to the 2013 law, a bench of Lokayukta should consist of judicial and non-judicial members. An Upa-Lokayukta is a deputy to Lokayukta and assists in her or his work and acts as the in-charge Lokayukta if the position fells vacant before time.

A Lokayukta of the state is appointed to office by the state Governor after consulting the committee consisting of State Chief Minister, Speaker of Legislative Assembly, Leader of Opposition, Chairman of Legislative Council and Leader of Opposition of Legislative Council and cannot be removed from office except for reasons specified in the Act and will serve the period of five years.

== History and administration ==
Rajasthan Lokayukta Act was passed in 1973 making it one of the first state's (3rd state) to pass the law before the Central Government passed the Bill, and got President's approval in January 2015. The Act was passed for the formation of anti-corruption panel to look into allegation of corruption and other abuse of power by Chief Minister, ex-Chief Ministers, other ministers under him and public functionaries and influential officials as per the Act. The act replaces the Odisha Lokpal and Lokayukta Act, 1995. As per the Indian Penal code all the proceedings before Lokayukta are considered as judicial proceedings.

Rajasthan Lokayukta Act prohibits disclosure of the identity of the complainant and the functionary against whom the complaint is filed during proceedings before it. The Act lays down for the electronically filed complaint to be filed in hard copy within 15 days of the date of complaint filed by the complainant. As per the Act protection is given for the integrity of the investigation process and to the complainant but not be liable in case the person discloses himself. According to the Act the complaint will be made void in case it is not related to public functionary or the content has ambiguity or fraud or is not related to the purpose mentioned therein. However the Lokayukta can continue with enquiry or investigation if he finds purpose in the complaint and the same is mentioned in the Act. Additionally if after commencement of investigation he finds the grounds are insufficient, he can discontinue the investigation. The office of Lokayukta has the facility of filing complaints online.

== Oath or affirmation ==
"I, <name>, having been appointed Lokayukta (or Upa-Lokayukta) do swear in the name of God (or solemnly affirm) that I will bear faith and allegiance to the Constitution of India as by law established and I will duly and faithfully and to the best of my ability, knowledge and judgment perform the duties of my office without fear or favour, affection or ill-will."

— First Schedule, Odisha Lokayukta and Deputy Lokayukta Act-2013

== Powers ==
Rajasthan Lokayukta has complete and exclusive authority for enquiring into allegations or complaints against the State Chief Minister, State Deputy Chief Minister, Ministers of the state Government, Leader of Opposition and Government officials.

== Appointment and tenure ==
Justice Pratap Krishna Lohra, former Rajasthan High Court judge was appointed as Lokayukta for the office of Rajasthan Lokayukta. Rajasthan Lokayukta tenure is five years.

== Notable cases ==
- Rajasthan Lokayukta resolved 28,524 cases out of 28,581 between years 2013 and 2019.
- Rajasthan Lokayukta got 885, 860, 814, and 755 complaints against the revenue, urban development and housing, police department and rural development departments respectively in year 2017-18.

== See also ==
- Lokpal and Lokayukta Act 2013
- West Bengal Lokayukta
- Tamilnadu Lokayukta
- Jharkhand Lokayukta
- Chhattisgarh Lokayog
