= Jharkhand Lokayukta =

Parliamentary Ombudsman for the state of Jharkhand

Agency overview
- Formed: 2001

Jurisdictional structure
- Federal agency: India
- Operations jurisdiction: India
- General nature: Federal law enforcement

Operational structure
- Headquarters: OFFICE OF THE LOKAYUKTA JHARKHAND, BOOTY ROAD, RANCHI-834008. Ph:(O)- 0651- 2360633, FAX-0651-2360622. Email-id: lokayukta-jhr@nic.in
- Agency executive: Hon’ble Justice Dhruv Narayan Upadhyay., Lokayukta

Jharkhand Lokayukta is the Parliamentary Ombudsman for the state of Jharkhand (India). It is a high level statutory functionary, created to address grievances of the public against ministers, legislators, administration and public servants in issues related to misuse of power, mal-administration and corruption. It was first formed under the Jharkhand Lokayukta Act-2001, and approved by the president of India. With The Lokpal and Lokayuktas Act, 2013 adopted by the Indian Parliament coming into force on 16 January 2014, each Indian state was required to appoint its Lokayukta within a year. A bench of Lokayukta should consist of judicial and non-judicial members. An Upa-Lokayukta is a deputy to Lokayukta and assists with her or his work and acts as the in-charge Lokayukta in case the position falls vacant before time.

A Lokayukta of the state is appointed to office by the state Governor after consulting the committee consisting of State Chief Minister, Speaker of Legislative Assembly, Leader of Opposition, or leader of largest opposition party in State Legislature, Chairman of Legislative Council and Leader of Opposition of Legislative Council and cannot be removed from office except for reasons specified in the Act and will serve the period of five years.

== History and administration ==
Jharkhand Lokayukta Act-2001 was passed in the Jharkhand Assembly and was effective from the year 2001. The Act was created from Bihar after Jharkhand got separated as a state and it got operational in latter from 4 December 2004. In 2011, Jharkhand Lokayukta Rules were amended to make them serious and to help remove corruption by including officials from top to bottom in the State Government offices and bringing Chief Minister's office under its purview. Once a complaint is received against any Government official it is forwarded to a competent authority to conduct a preliminary investigation within a prescribed time frame and once the complaint is proved a regular case is filed. In 2015, Jharkhand Lokayukta had got a new office near Jharkhand Mukti Morcha(JMM) leader and party president Sibu Soren's official residence.

Lokayukta in Jharkhand does not have power of search and seizure.

== Oath or affirmation ==
"I, <name>, having been appointed Lokayukta (or Upa-Lokayukta) do swear in the name of God (or solemnly affirm) that I will bear faith and allegiance to the Constitution of India as by law established and I will duly and faithfully and to the best of my ability, knowledge and judgment perform the duties of my office without fear or favour, affection or ill-will."

— First Schedule, JHARKHAND LOKAYUKTA Act-2001

== Powers ==
Jharkhand Lokayukta has complete and exclusive authority for enquiring into allegations or complaints against the State Chief Minister, State Deputy Chief Minister, Ministers of the state Government, Mayors of cities, Leader of Opposition and Government officials. The institution has powers to investigate and prosecute any government official or public servants who are covered by the act and abuses his authority for his self interest or causes hurt to anyone or any action done intentionally or following corrupt practices negatively impacting the state or individual.

== Appointment and tenure ==
Jharkhand Lokayukta is Justice Dhruv Narayan Upadhyay, will head a two member team with a term of five years or reaching of the age of 70 years, whichever is earlier. He retired as a judge of Jharkhand High Court. Jharkhand Lokayukta Chairperson will be appointed by Governor along with other members who are recommended by a committee headed by Chief Minister and other members being Speaker of Assembly and Opposition Leader in Assembly, or elected leader of the largest opposition party in the Assembly.

Following is the list and tenure of various Lokayuktas of the state:

Index	Name	Holding charge from	Holding charge to
1	Hon'ble Mr. Justice Laxman Oraon	4 December 2004	4 December 2009
2	Hon'ble Mr. Justice, Amareshwar Sahay	3 January 2011	2 January 2016
3	Hon'ble Mr. Justice, D.N. Upadhyay	13 January 2017	

== Notable cases ==
1. In 2019, Jharkhand Lokayukta Justice Dhruv Narayan Upadhyay on a complaint of corruption received against Ranchi deputy mayor Sanjeev Vijayvargiya, had forwarded the same to state's Anti-corruption department with a direction to investigate.
2. In 2019, Jharkhand Lokayukta on a complaint received formed a three member team to enquire into allegations of corruption and misuse of office by officials of National Dairy Development Board (NDDB) and Jharkhand State Cooperative Milk Producers’ Federation (JMF) and were found to be correct.

== See also ==
- Goa Lokayukta
- Karnataka Lokayukta
- Chhattisgarh Lokayog
- Haryana Lokayukta
