= Sanjay Bhatia (civil servant) =

Indian civil servant

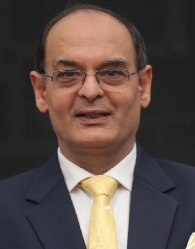

Lokayukta, Upa-Lokayukta Maharashtra
- Incumbent
- Assumed office 28 August 2020
- Preceded by: Shri Dattatraya Padsalgikar

Chairman Mumbai Port Trust & Indian Ports Association
- In office 14 March 2016 – 31 July 2020
- Preceded by: Ravi Parmar
- Succeeded by: Rajiv Jalota

Personal details
- Born: 5 July 1960 (age 66) Shimla, Himachal Pradesh
- Education: Southern Cross University
- Occupation: Civil service, IAS

Sanjay Bhatia (born 5 July 1960) is the Upa-Lokayukta of Maharashtra (equivalent to a deputy ombudsman) and current head (in charge) of the Lokayukta. He is the former chairman of Mumbai Port Trust and Indian Ports Association. He is an Indian Administrative Service (IAS) officer of 1985 batch who has served at various levels of the state and central governments in India.

== Early life and education ==
Bhatia is a mechanical engineer with an MBA from Southern Cross University, Australia, and a Maharashtra cadre IAS officer of the 1985 batch.

== Career ==
- Upa-Lokayutka of Maharashtra with a term of five years from August 2020.
- Chairman of the Mumbai Port Trust for four years till July 2020 and Indian Ports Association (dual role).
- Vice Chairman & Managing Director, CIDCO (Development of New towns, Airport, METRO).
- Commissioner, Sales Tax, Managing Director of Maharashtra State Electricity Distribution Co, Director, Heavy Industries, Central government, Collector, Gadchiroli, CEO, ZP, Solapur.

== Personal life ==
Bhatia is a practitioner of meditation, and teaches heartfulness meditation.
