= Virendra Singh (judge) =

Hon'ble Justice Virendra Singh

Lokayukta, Uttar Pradesh
- Appointed by: Supreme Court of India
- Succeeded by: Justice N.K. Mehrotra

Personal details
- Born: 4 January 1949 (age 77) Vill. Tiwaya, post tiwayaSaharanpur, Uttar Pradesh, India

Virendra Singh (Lokayukta) was appointed lokayukta of Uttar Pradesh on 16 December 2015 by Supreme Court of India. He is the first Lokayukta of India who is appointed by Supreme Court of India. He is successor of Justice N.K. Mehrotra. The Supreme Court exercises its right under Article 142 of the Constitution to make the appointment of Lokayukta .

== Personal life ==
- 1977:Legal Practice start and selection in PCS (J)
- 1985:Promoted as Civil Judge.
- 2005 :District Judge-Maharajganj, Banda, Balia, Mathura
- 2009:High Court-Justice (13 April 2009)
- 2011 :Retirement (13 January 2011)
- 2011 :Chairman of State Consumer Commission of UP

== Seventh Lokayukta ==
1. Justice Vishwambhar Dayal (14 September 1977----)
2. Justice Mirza Mohammad Murtaza Husain
3. Justice Kailash Nath Goyal
4. Justice Justice Rajeshwar Singh
5. Justice Sudhir Chandra Verma
6. Justice N.K.Mehrotra
7. Justice Virendra Singh (20 December 2015-----)

== Swearing postponed ==
After the intervention of the Supreme Court, Virendra's appointed was replaced by retired judge Sanjay Mishra after the state government was accused of concealing facts regarding the appointed and objections raised by chief justice of Allahabad High Court.
