= Lell =

Family name

Lell is a surname. Notable people with the surname include:

- Alari Lell (born 1976), Estonian footballer
- Christian Lell (born 1984), German footballer
- Eduardo Lell (born 1964), Argentine footballer

== See also ==
- Lall
