= Lall =

Lall is both a surname and a given name. Notable people with the name include:

Surname:

- Hemant Lall (born 1951), American bridge player and father of bridge pro Justin Lall (1986–2020)
- K. B. Lall (died 2005), civil servant of India and a member of ICS
- Kesar Lall (1926–2012), Nepalese folklorist and writer
- Muni Lall, former Union minister of state of India
- Premjit Lall (1940–2008), professional tennis player from India
- Rajiv Lall, managing director and vice chairman of Infrastructure Development Finance Company (IDFC)
- Raul Lall (born 1994), Guyanese judoka
- Sanjaya Lall (1940–2005), development economist, Professor of Economics and Fellow of Green College, Oxford University
- Vijay Lall, Lt General, Indian Army General Officer (born 1942)
- Vivek Lall, aerospace scientist

Given name:

- Nautam Bhagwan Lall Bhatt (1909–2005), Indian physicist
- Brijmohan Lall Munjal, Indian businessman and chairman of Hero Group
- Lall Sawh, Trinidadian urologist in the Caribbean and Latin America
- Mutty Lall Seal (1792–1854), Indian businessman and philanthropist
- Mohan Lall Shrimal, former chief justice of Sikkim High Court
- Lall Singh (1909–1985), early Indian Test cricketer

== See also ==
- The In-Between World of Vikram Lall, novel by M. G. Vassanji, published in 2003 by Doubleday Canada
- Lalla
- Lalli
- Lally (disambiguation)
- Lallé (disambiguation)
