= P. Lakshmana Reddy =

P. Lakshmana Reddy (born 18 April 1945), also spelt P. Lakshman Reddy, is an Indian retired judge who served on the erstwhile Andhra Pradesh High Court before the bifurcation of Andhra Pradesh and serving as the first Andhra Pradesh Lokayukta post-bifurcation.
