= N. K. Sudhindra Rao =

Indian jurist

N. K. Sudhindra Rao is an Indian jurist known for his tenure as a judge on the Karnataka Lokayukta special court in Bangalore, which is tasked with dealing with political corruption. Rao has a reputation for upholding the values of the Lokayukta system, remaining unswayed by political pressure.

== Awards ==
Rao received the Namma Benagaluru Varshada Vyakthi award in 2011.
