= Maharashtra Lokayukta =

Anti-corruption Ombudsman for the state of Maharastra

Agency overview
- Formed: 1971
- Employees: 85
- Annual budget: ₹3.5 crore (US$370,000)

Jurisdictional structure
- Federal agency: India
- Operations jurisdiction: India
- Constituting instrument: Maharashtra Lokayukta and Upa-Lokayuktas Act
- General nature: Federal law enforcement

Operational structure
- Headquarters: New Administrative Building, 1st Floor, Madam Kama Marg, Opposite Mantralaya, Mumbai, India
- Agency executive: Hon. Shri V M Kanade, Lokayukta of Maharashtra .

Website
- https://lokayukta.maharashtra.gov.in

The State of Maharashtra is the first and pioneer State in India to introduce the concept of Lokayukta by enacting the Maharashtra Lokayukta and Upa-Lokayuktas Act, 1971 in view of the recommendations made by the Administrative Reforms Commission headed by Late Shri Morarji Desai in 1966. The Maharashtra Lokayukta is an apex statutory functionary in the State of Maharashtra, independent of the governing political and public administration, created to address the grievances of the people against the Govt. of Maharashtra and its administration. Lokayukta, the Indian equivalent of the Parliamentary Ombudsman was first established in the State of Maharashtra in 1972. It was established through The Maharashtra Lokayukta and Upa-Lokayuktas Act, 1971. (Although, Odisha was the first state to pass the act in 1970, it was implemented there only in 1983 when it nominated its first lokayukta).

The Governor appoints the Lokayukta after due consultations with Chief Justice of the Bombay High Court and Leader of Opposition in the Maharashtra Legislative Assembly. Upa-Lokayukta is appointed after consultation with the Lokayukta. Once appointed, Lokayuka or Upa-Lokayukta can remain in office for a term of five years.

== Appointment and tenure ==
Following is the list of Lokayuktas for Maharashtra:

Index	Name	Holding charge from	Holding charge to
1	S. P. Kotwal	25 October 1972	24 October 1977
2	L. M. Nadkarni	25 October 1977	1 January 1978
3	A. R. Shimpi	2 January 1978	25 January 1979
4	S. V. Bhave	26 January 1979	5 September 1979
5	N. D. Kamath	6 September 1979	to be updated

V. M. Kanade appointed as Lokayukta in 2021

== Removal ==
Lokayuka or Upa-Lokayukta can be removed from his office through the process of impeachment. The removal can only be on the grounds of misbehavior or incapacity and no other grounds. The procedure for removal is as per Article 311 of Constitution of India.

== Notable cases ==
- In April 2021, the state Lokayukta had asked for a report from the principal secretary (housing) and Chairman of Maharashtra Housing Area Development Authority (Mhada) on allegation of land encroachment against one of the ministers in the state Government.
- In May 2021, state governor had referred to Lokayukta of the alleged wrong practices followed in e-ticketing tenders of MSRTC for investigation and appropriate action.
- The institution received around 23,718 complaints for investigation from January 2015 to June 2019.

== Powers ==
Any citizen can make his/her complaints of corruption directly to the Lokayukta against any government official or elected representative. Lokayukta's power varies from State to State. In some States, the Lokayukta inquires into allegations against public functionaries including Chief Minister, Ministers and MLAs. While some has the power to investigate into civil servants/bureaucrats, judiciary and police.

In year 2019, Maharashtra Government brought the Chief Minister's office under the purview of this institution.

The state also introduced online complaint facility service for the public.

== See also ==
- Uttar Pradesh Lokayukta
- Karnataka Lokayukta
- Goa Lokayukta
- Assam Lokayukta
- Andhra Pradesh Lokayukta
- Telangana Lokayukta
