= Haryana Lokayukta =

Anti-corruption Ombudsman for the state of Haryana

Haryana

Agency overview
- Formed: 2003

Jurisdictional structure
- Federal agency: India
- Operations jurisdiction: India
- General nature: Federal law enforcement

Operational structure
- Headquarters: Haryana Lok Ayukta, Lokayukta, Haryana New Secretariat Haryana Room No 232, 2nd Floor Sector-17, Chandigarh.
- Agency executive: HON'BLE Shri Justice Hari Pal Verma., Lokayukta

Haryana Lokayukta is the Parliamentary Ombudsman for the state of Haryana (India). It is a high level statutory functionary, created to address grievances of the public against ministers, legislators, administration and public servants in issues related to misuse of power, mal-administration and corruption. It was first formed under the Haryana Lokayukta and Deputy Lokayukta Act-2002, and approved by the president of India. With The Lokpal and Lokayuktas Act, 2013 adopted by the Indian Parliament coming into force on 16 January 2014, each state in India was required to appoint its Lokayukta within a year. A bench of Lokayukta should consist of judicial and non-judicial members. An Upa-Lokayukta is a deputy to Lokayukta and assists with her or his work and acts as the in-charge Lokayukta in case the position falls vacant before time.

A Lokayukta of the state is appointed to office by the state Governor after consulting the committee consisting of State Chief Minister, Speaker of Legislative Assembly, Leader of Opposition, Chairman of Legislative Council and Leader of Opposition of Legislative Council and cannot be removed from office except for reasons specified in the Act and will serve the period of five years.

== History and administration ==
Haryana Lokayukta Act makes provision for serving Chief Justice or Judge in any High Courts of India or a serving Judge in Supreme Court of India to be appointed as its Lokayukta. Haryana Legislature passed "The Haryana Lokayukta (Amendment) Bill 2021" deducting the salary paid to Lokayukta.

== Oath or affirmation ==
"I, <name>, having been appointed Lokayukta (or Upa-Lokayukta) do swear in the name of God (or solemnly affirm) that I will bear faith and allegiance to the Constitution of India as by law established and I will duly and faithfully and to the best of my ability, knowledge and judgment perform the duties of my office without fear or favour, affection or ill-will."

— First Schedule, Haryana Lokayukta and Deputy Lokayukta Act-2003

== Powers ==
Haryana Lokayukta has complete and exclusive authority for enquiring into allegations or complaints against the State Chief Minister, State Deputy Chief Minister, Ministers of the state Government, Leader of Opposition and Government officials.

== Appointment and tenure ==
In 2021, Retired judge of the Punjab and Haryana high court, Justice Hari Pal Verma, has been appointed as fifth Haryana Lokayukta for a period of five years. Justice Nawal Kishore Agarwal, who was an ex judge of the Chhattisgarh high court served before him and retired in July 2021.

== Notable cases ==
In September 2021, Haryana Lokayukta, on a complaint filed on the alleged sale of farmland soil worth Rs 3 crore for Rs 3 lakhs, it recommended enquiry against three jail officials Jagjit Singh, IG Prisons; Sunil Sangwan, Superintendent, Rohtak jail, and Dayanand, Superintendent, Jhajjar jail.

In 2016, Haryana Lokayukta order dismissing a complaint for seeking probe into allegations of "favouritism" shown by than Chief Minister Manohar Lal Khattar in colluding with state Chief Secretary DS Dhesi for suggesting names of his minister Ram Bilas Sharma’s daughter and Principal Secretary Rajesh Khullar’s wife for nomination as an appointment to IAS out from the state cadres of officers was challenged in the Punjab and Haryana High Court.

== See also ==
- Lokpal and Lokayukta Act, 2013
- Delhi Lokayukta
- Himachal Pradesh Lokayukta
- Gujarat Lokayukta
- Goa Lokayukta
- Bihar Lokayukta
