= Krishna Chandra Agarwal =

Indian judge (born 1934)

Chief Justice of Rajasthan High Court
- In office 15 April 1990 – 1994
- Appointed by: Ramaswamy Venkataraman

Chief Justice of Calcutta High Court
- In office 1994 – 15 January 1996
- Appointed by: Shankar Dayal Sharma
- Preceded by: Anandamoy Bhattacharjee
- Succeeded by: V. N. Khare

Personal details
- Born: 15 January 1934
- Education: Allahabad University
- Occupation: lawyer, judge

Krishna Chandra Agarwal (born 15 January 1934) is an Indian retired judge. He is a former Chief Justice of Rajasthan High Court and Calcutta High Court.

== Career ==
Agarwal studied in Agarwal Intermediate College at Allahabad and became Law graduate from Allahabad University. After the advocate's enrollment in 1956 he practiced in Civil and constitutional matters in the Allahabad High Court. Since 1970 he worked as Chief Standing Counsel of the State Government. He was the Editor of the Allahabad Law Journal. Agarwal was appointed additional Judge of Allahabad High Court on 6 August 1973. He was transferred as Chief Justice of Rajasthan High Court on 15 April 1990 and in 1994 he became the Chief Justice of the Calcutta High Court. Justice Agarwal retired on 15 January 1996.
