= Mizoram Lokayukta =

Parliamentary Ombudsman

Agency overview
- Formed: 2014

Jurisdictional structure
- Federal agency: India
- Operations jurisdiction: India
- General nature: Federal law enforcement

Operational structure
- Headquarters: Mizoram Lokayukta
- Agency executive: Pu C. Lalsawta, IAS (Retd)., Chairperson, Lokayukta.

Website
- https://lokayukta.mizoram.gov.in/

Mizoram Lokayukta is the Parliamentary Ombudsman for the state of Mizoram (India). It is a high level statutory functionary, created to address grievances of the public against ministers, legislators, administration and public servants in issues related to misuse of power, mal-administration and corruption. It was first formed under the Mizoram Lokayukta and Deputy Lokayukta Act-2014 and approved by the president of India. With The Lokpal and Lokayuktas Act, 2013 adopted by Parliament coming into forced on 16 January 2014, each state in India was required to appoint its Lokayukta within a year. A bench of Lokayukta should consist of judicial and non-judicial members. An Upa-Lokayukta is a deputy to the Lokayukta and assists in her or his work and acts as the in-charge Lokayukta if the position falls vacant before time.

A Lokayukta of the state is appointed to office by the state Governor after consulting the committee consisting of State Chief Minister, Speaker of Legislative Assembly, Leader of Opposition, or leader of largest opposition party in State Legislature, Chairman of Legislative Council and Leader of Opposition of Legislative Council and cannot be removed from office except for reasons specified in the Act and will serve the period of five years.

== History and administration ==
The Mizoram Lokayukta Bill, 2014 was passed in the Mizoram Assembly and was effective from November 2014. Mizoram Government was recommended by the Supreme Court of India to appoint its first Lokayukta. Under the Act there is a provision to create a separate Director of Investigation department. Under the Act provision is made to protect the identity of persons filing genuine complaints and punishing those filing fraudulent allegations. In 2019 the state Legislature passed ‘The Mizoram Lokayukta (Amendment) Rules, 2019’. The state cabinet approved to create 35 new posts under Mizoram Lokayukta. Mizoram Lokayukta will be selected by a committee consisting of the Chief Minister, Speaker of the Assembly, High Court judge and the Leader of Opposition in state Assembly as a five-member team to recommend names.

Mizoram Lokayukta will be three member team headed by current or former Chief Justice or judge of a High Court or with similar qualifications and one member each with judicial and non-judicial backgrounds. Members of the team will have a term of five years or will hold the post till attaining 70 years whichever is earlier, with the salary of a High Court judge but will not be subject to reappointment after terms are over. To handle enquiries, investigations and prosecutions of corruption cases, Lokayukta has the power to appoint a secretary and a director and can take over cases from other agencies which had not been heard in any court. Lokayukta has to complete the preliminary enquiry within 45 days and complete the investigation within 9 months and has powers to investigate on its own or assign it to any agency to assist. Subsequently, the report has to be filed in a special court and judgment to be delivered in 18 months. On request of the Governor and approval by Supreme Court of India, the Lokayukta can be removed from office.

== Oath or affirmation ==
"I, <name>, having been appointed Lokayukta (or Upa-Lokayukta) do swear in the name of God (or solemnly affirm) that I will bear faith and allegiance to the Constitution of India as by law established and I will duly and faithfully and to the best of my ability, knowledge and judgment perform the duties of my office without fear or favour, affection or ill-will."

— First Schedule, Mizoram Lokayukta and Deputy Lokayukta Act-2014

== Powers ==
Mizoram Lokayukta has complete and exclusive authority for enquiring into allegations or complaints against the State Chief Minister, State Deputy Chief Minister, Ministers of the state Government, Leader of Opposition and Government officials. Lokayukta Act of the state which serves as its tool against corruption covers Chief Ministers, ex-Chief Ministers, Government officials, Ministers, IAS officers and all public servants including from local administration, police, customs and heads of companies, and societies, trusts which are partly funded by state or centre.

== Appointment and tenure ==
Mizoram Lokayukta got its first Chairperson as Pu C. Lalsawta, IAS (Retd).

== Notable cases ==
Mizoram Lokayukta received complaints towards 11 corruption cases since its formation in 2018 out of which four had been transferred to state's Anti-corruption department and three cases were resolved.

== See also ==
- Lokpal and Lokayukta Act, 2013
