= Meghalaya Lokayukta =

Agency overview
- Formed: 2014

Jurisdictional structure
- Federal agency: India
- Operations jurisdiction: India
- General nature: Federal law enforcement

Operational structure
- Headquarters: Meghalaya Lokayukta, Shillong.
- Agency executive: Pranoy Kumar Musahary, Lokayukta

Meghalaya Lokayukta is the Parliamentary Ombudsman for the state of Meghalaya (India). It is a high level statutory functionary, created to address grievances of the public against ministers, legislators, administration and public servants in issues related to misuse of power, mal-administration and corruption. It was first formed under the Meghalaya Lokayukta and Deputy Lokayukta Act-2014 and approved by the president of India. With The Lokpal and Lokayuktas Act, 2013 adopted by the Indian Parliament coming into force on 16 January 2014, each state in India was required to appoint its Lokayukta within a year. A bench of Lokayukta should consist of judicial and non-judicial members. An Upa-Lokayukta is a deputy to the Lokayukta and assists in her or his work and acts as the in-charge Lokayukta in case the position fells vacant before time.

A Lokayukta of the state is appointed to office by the state Governor after consulting the committee consisting of State Chief Minister, Speaker of Legislative Assembly, Leader of Opposition, or leader of largest opposition party in State Legislature, Chairman of Legislative Council and Leader of Opposition of Legislative Council and cannot be removed from office except for reasons specified in the Act and will serve the period of five years.

== History and administration ==
The Meghalaya Lokayukta Bill, 2014 was passed in the Meghalaya Assembly and was effective from 7 March 2014 and will replace the older ones passed ten years back. Meghalaya Lokayukta Act, 2014 was amended in 2021 giving state government powers to constitute Lokayukta as a single or multi-member body. According to Lokayukta Act, Opposition leader in Assembly, any person from common public, association in state or organizations of state can file a formal complaint petition before it. It is constituted as five member team with judicial and non-judicial members. Meghalaya Government was recommended by the Supreme Court of India to appoint its first Lokayukta. Lokayukta of the state can pass order without inquiry. Lokayukta of the state is independent body and cannot be influenced by state Government.

== Oath or affirmation ==
"I, <name>, having been appointed Lokayukta (or Upa-Lokayukta) do swear in the name of God (or solemnly affirm) that I will bear faith and allegiance to the Constitution of India as by law established and I will duly and faithfully and to the best of my ability, knowledge and judgment perform the duties of my office without fear or favour, affection or ill-will."

— First Schedule, Meghalaya Lokayukta and Deputy Lokayukta Act-2014

== Powers ==
Meghalaya Lokayukta has complete and exclusive authority for enquiring into allegations or complaints against the State Chief Minister, State Deputy Chief Minister, Ministers of the state Government, Leader of Opposition and Government officials but with a clause citing complaints for public interest the State Government can prevent its operational effectiveness. Lokayukta Act of the state which serves as its tool against corruption covers Chief Ministers, ex-Chief Ministers, Government officials, Ministers, IAS officers and all public servants including from local administration, police, and customs.

== Appointment and tenure ==
Meghalaya Lokayukta got its first Chairperson as Pranoy Kumar Musahary, a former judge of Gauhati High Court.

== Notable cases ==
In 2019, Meghalaya Lokayukta had directed that all employees of the State Government including their spouses and children should declare their assets and liabilities.

In 2018, Meghalaya Lokayukta had directed State Government to direct CBI probe regarding illegal mining of coal and its transportation from state.

In 2020, Meghalaya Lokayukta in a complaint against government officials being involved in the smuggling of boulders, betel nuts and coal to other states, passed an order to the CBI for the investigation of same.

Meghalaya Lokayukta even on request of the Meghalaya Government refused to amend, recall or modify the order passed by it in the Khliehriat case and refused any respite to the latter alleging the Government of interfering with the powers of the statutory body.

The validity of the Lokayukta Act was challenged in the Meghalaya High Court in relation to a case that the Lokayukta was following up. Former GHADC secretary Hewingson Sangma moved the apex court challenging the 10 July order of the division bench of the High Court of Meghalaya which did not give any relief to the petitioner who questioned the validity of Lokayukta Act following the charge sheet order. On 4 August 2023, the Supreme Court dismissed as withdrawn a Special Leave Petition filed by former secretary GHADC Hewingson Sangma who was chargesheeted along with 12 others in connection with a scam in GHADC.

== See also ==
- Lokpal and Lokayukta Act, 2013
