= Manipur Lokayukta =

Agency overview
- Formed: 2013

Jurisdictional structure
- Federal agency: India
- Operations jurisdiction: India
- General nature: Federal law enforcement

Operational structure
- Headquarters: Manipur Lokayukta, 3rd Floor, Directorate Complex,2nd M.R. North A.O.C., Imphal - 795001. Email: lokayukta.mn@gov.in. Telephone No. 0385 - 2421205 (During office hours on working days)
- Agency executive: Hon’ble Shri JUSTICE (RETD) T NANDAKUMAR SINGH., Lokayukta

Manipur Lokayukta is the Parliamentary Ombudsman for the state of Manipur (India). It is a high level statutory functionary, created to address grievances of the public against ministers, legislators, administration and public servants in issues related to misuse of power, mal-administration and corruption. It was first formed under the Manipur Lokayukta and Deputy Lokayukta Act-2014 and approved by the president of India. With The Lokpal and Lokayuktas Act, 2013 adopted by the Indian Parliament coming into force on 16 January 2014, each state in India was required to appoint its Lokayukta within a year. A bench of Lokayukta should consist of judicial and non-judicial members. An Upa-Lokayukta is a deputy to Lokayukta and assists him in his work and acts as the in-charge Lokayukta in case the position falls vacant before time.

A Lokayukta of the state is appointed to office by the state Governor after consulting the committee consisting of State Chief Minister, Speaker of Legislative Assembly, Leader of Opposition, or leader of largest opposition party in State Legislature, Chairman of Legislative Council and Leader of Opposition of Legislative Council and cannot be removed from office except for reasons specified in the Act and will serve the period of five years.

== History and administration ==
Manipur Lokayukta Act-2014 was passed in the Manipur Assembly and was effective from 1 April 2018. The institution formed as the quasi-judicial body will help the state Government making its administration transparent to the people. It is created as an independent organisation with powers of investigation and prosecution for complaints against elected members and public servants and helps resolve people grievances effectively, efficiently and timely. Limitation period of any complaint is 7 years from the date of crime committee and any person can file a complaint. However, a crime of recurring nature has no limitation period and complaint can be filed any time. As it is created in the interest of the General Public, they are free to approach anytime without fear or any complexion. Manipur is one of the few states having Judicial and Non Judicial members in Lokayukta as specified in Lokayukta and Upa-Lokayukta's Act 2013. The Lokayukta bench of the state should have a Chairperson serving as Chief Justice of High Court or Judge of Supreme Court, and members from Judicial and Non-Judicial background. The institution had been set up in public interest for complaints against Government officials and preliminary enquiry to check the authenticity of complaints will be done. First Lokayukta of Manipur was appointed on 13 May 2019.

In 2019, Manipur Lokayukta website was launched where pending cases will be shown and different kinds of complaints can be filed and can be uploaded after requisite formalities and general public can know about Lokayukta operations. Office of Manipur Lokayukta operates from Manipur Lokayukta,3rd Floor, Directorate Complex,2nd M.R. North A.O.C., Imphal - 795001. In 2020, foundation stone for a new Lokayukta office was laid by State Chief Minister.

== Oath or affirmation ==
"I, <name>, having been appointed Lokayuka (or Upa-Lokayukta) do swear in the name of God (or solemnly affirm) that I will bear faith and allegiance to the Constitution of India as by law established and I will duly and faithfully and to the best of my ability, knowledge and judgment perform the duties of my office without fear or favour, affection or ill-will."

— First Schedule, Manipur Lokayukta and Deputy Lokayukta Act-2014

== Powers ==
Manipur Lokayukta has complete and exclusive authority for enquiring into allegations or complaints against the State Chief Minister, State Deputy Chief Minister, Ministers of the state Government, Leader of Opposition and Government officials. Lokayukta Act of the state which serves as its tool against corruption covers Chief Ministers, ex-Chief Ministers, Government officials, Ministers, IAS officers and all public servants. Manipur Lokayukta has powers to enquire into corruption allegations and related matters against Government officials, Public servants and elected officials in the Government.

== Appointment and tenure ==
First Lokayukta of Manipur is Justice(Retd)T Nandakumar Singh. Justice (Retd) Basu Deo Agarwal as Judicial member and Ameising Luikham, IAS (Retd) as Non-judicial member are part of Lokayukta.

== See also ==
- Lokpal and Lokayukta Act, 2013
