= Anandamoy Bhattacharjee =

29th Chief Justice of Bombay High Court

Hon'ble Chief Justice (Retd.) Anandamoy Bhattacharjee

29th Chief Justice of Bombay High Court
- In office 21 April 1994 – 1 April 1995
- Nominated by: M. N. Venkatachaliah
- Appointed by: S. D. Sharma
- Preceded by: Sujata Manohar
- Succeeded by: M. B. Shah; M. L. Pendse (acting)

27th Chief Justice of Calcutta High Court
- In office 25 January 1993 – 20 April 1994
- Nominated by: L. M. Sharma
- Appointed by: S. D. Sharma
- Preceded by: N. P. Singh
- Succeeded by: K. C. Agarwal

Judge of Calcutta High Court
- In office 3 February 1986 – 24 January 1993; Acting CJ : 15 June 1992 - 24 January 1993
- Nominated by: P. N. Bhagwati
- Appointed by: Zail Singh

Judge of Sikkim High Court
- In office 16 June 1976 – 2 February 1986
- Nominated by: Ajit Nath Ray
- Appointed by: Fakhruddin A. Ahmed
- Acting Chief Justice
- In office 14 March 1983 – 16 December 1983
- Appointed by: Zail Singh
- Preceded by: Manmohan Singh Gujral
- Succeeded by: Mohan Lall Shrimal
- In office 4 January 1985 – 20 January 1986
- Appointed by: Zail Singh
- Preceded by: Mohan Lall Shrimal
- Succeeded by: Jugal Kishore Mohanty

Advocate General of Sikkim
- In office June 1975 – June 1976

Personal details
- Born: 20 December 1933
- Died: 16 January 2008 (aged 74)
- Education: St. Paul's College, Scottish Church College, University College of Law, Calcutta

Anandamoy Bhattacharjee (20 December 1933 – 16 January 2008) was a Bengali Indian jurist, who served as the chief justice of the Calcutta High Court and the Bombay High Court between 1993 and 1995. He had also served as Judge and acting chief justice of the Sikkim High Court.

== Early life ==
He was born on 20 December 1933 and was educated at the Siliguri Boys High School in Siliguri, the St. Paul's Cathedral Mission College, the Scottish Church College both in Kolkata and at Department of Law, University of Calcutta.

== Career ==
He enrolled as an advocate of the Calcutta High Court on 7 January 1957. His work as a lawyer centered on civil and criminal matters in the district courts of Darjeeling and Jalpaiguri and at Gangtok (in Sikkim). He had also worked as legal adviser to the Government of Sikkim from May 1972. He also served as Advocate of General of Sikkim from June 1975. He was appointed a judge in the Sikkim High Court in June 1976, and was appointed acting chief justice there twice in March 1983 and in January 1985. He was transferred as judge to the Calcutta High Court in February 1986, and was the acting chief justice there from June 1992. He served as the chief justice of the Calcutta High Court from January 1993 to 1994, and was subsequently transferred as the chief justice of the Bombay High Court in April 1994 where he stayed in office until April 1995 when he was forced to resign by Bombay Bar headed by Iqbal Chagla on corruption charges.

After his retirement, he served as a visiting faculty at the Rajiv Gandhi School of Intellectual Property Law of the Indian Institute of Technology Kharagpur.
