= Manmohan Singh Gujral =

Indian judge

1st Chief Justice of Sikkim High Court
- In office 7 May 1976 – 14 March 1983
- Nominated by: Ajit Nath Ray
- Appointed by: Fakhruddin Ali Ahmed
- Preceded by: Position established; Rajinder Sachar (acting)
- Succeeded by: Mohan Lall Shrimal; A. M. Bhattacharjee (acting)

Judge of Punjab & Haryana High Court
- In office 21 August 1969 – 6 May 1976
- Appointed by: M. Hidayatullah (acting President of India)

Personal details
- Born: 15 March 1921
- Died: 12 September 2015 (aged 94)

Manmohan Singh Gujral (15 March 1921 – 12 September 2015) was an indian judge and the first Chief Justice of the Sikkim High Court

== Career ==
Gujral remained District and Sessions Judge at Ambala, Chandigarh, Shimla and Rohtak. He was also the Legal Remembrancer of joint Punjab. He took charge as the first District & Additional Sessions Judge of Andaman and Nicobar Islands in 1965. He was elevated as a Judge of the Punjab and Haryana High Court on 21 August 1969. On 7 May 1976 he was transferred and became the first Chief Justice of the Sikkim High Court. Justice Gujral retired on 15 March 1983 and passed away in 2015.
