= Jan Lokpal Bill =

Proposed legislative bill in India

The Jan Lokpal Bill, also referred to as the Citizen's Ombudsman Bill, was a bill drawn up by civil society activists in India seeking the appointment of a Jan Lokpal, an independent body to investigate corruption cases and complete the investigation within a year for envisaging trial in the case getting completed within one year.

The Jan Lokpal aimed to deter corruption, compensate citizen grievances, and protect whistle-blowers. The prefix Jan (transl. citizens) signifies that these improvements include inputs provided by "ordinary citizens" through an activist-driven, non-governmental public consultation.

The word Lokpal was coined in 1963 by L. M. Singhvi, a member of parliament during a debate.

== Origins ==
The demand for a Jan Lokpal was inspired by the Hong Kong Independent Commission Against Corruption and taken forward by a group of activists that came to be styled by the media as Team Anna.

== Key features ==
Some important features of the bill are:

1. To establish an anti-corruption institution called Lokpal at the national level, supported by Lokayukta at the state level.
2. As is the case with the Supreme Court of India and Cabinet Secretariat, the Lokpal will be supervised by the Cabinet Secretary and the Election Commission. As a result, it will be completely independent of the government and free from ministerial influence in its investigations.
3. Members will be appointed by judges, Indian Administrative Service officers with a clean record, private citizens and constitutional authorities through a transparent and participatory process.
4. A selection committee will invite short-listed candidates for interviews, the video recordings of which will thereafter be made public.
5. Inquiry has to be completed within 60 days and investigation to be completed within six months. Lokpal shall order an investigation only after hearing the public servant.
6. Losses to the government by a corrupt individual will be recovered at the time of conviction.
7. Whistle-blowers who alert the agency to potential corruption cases will also be provided with protection.

== Powers of the Lokpal ==
The Lokpal has jurisdiction to inquire into allegations of corruption against anyone who is or has been Prime Minister, or a Minister in the Union government, or a Member of Parliament, as well as officials of the Union government under Groups A, B, C and D. Also covered are chairpersons, members, officers and directors of any board, corporation, society, trust or autonomous body either established by an Act of Parliament or wholly or partly funded by the Union or State government. It also covers any society or trust or body that receives foreign contribution above ₹1 million (approx. US$12,045/- as of 2024).

The Lokpal, however, cannot inquire into any corruption charge against the Prime Minister if the allegations are related to international relations, external and internal security, and public order, unless a full Bench of the Lokpal, consisting of its chair and all members, considers the initiation of a probe, and at least two-thirds of the members approve it. Such a hearing should be held in camera, and if the complaint is dismissed, the records shall not be published or made available to anyone.

A complaint under the Lokpal Act should be in the prescribed form and must pertain to an offence under the Prevention of Corruption Act against a public servant. There is no restriction on who can make such a complaint. When a complaint is received, the Lokpal may order a preliminary inquiry by its Inquiry Wing, or refer it for investigation by any agency, including the CBI, if there is a prima facie case. Before the ordering of an investigation by the agency, the Lokpal shall call for an explanation from the public servant to determine whether a prima facie case exists. This provision, the Act says, will not interfere with any search and seizure that may be undertaken by the investigating agency. The Lokpal, with respect to Central government servants, may refer the complaints to the Central Vigilance Commission (CVC). The CVC will send a report to the Lokpal regarding officials falling under Groups A and B; and proceed as per the CVC Act against those in Groups C and D.

Institution of Lokpal has “Inquiry Wing, headed by the Director of Inquiry, for the purpose of conducting preliminary inquiry into any offence alleged to have been committed by a public servant which is punishable under the Prevention of Corruption Act, 1988. The Inquiry Wing or any other agency will have to complete its preliminary inquiry and submit a report to the Lokpal within 60 days. It has to seek comments from both the public servant and "the competent authority," before submitting its report. There will be a ‘competent authority’ for each category of public servant. For instance, for the Prime Minister, it is the Lok Sabha, and for other Ministers, it will be the Prime Minister, and for department officials, it will be the Minister concerned. It also has a “Prosecution Wing headed by the Director of Prosecution for the purpose of prosecution of public servants in relation to any complaint by the Lokpal under this Act”.

A Lokpal Bench consisting of no less than three members shall consider the preliminary inquiry report, and after giving an opportunity to the public servant accused of corruption for his/her defence, decide whether it should proceed with the investigation. It can order a full investigation, or initiate departmental proceedings or close the proceedings. It may also proceed against the complainant if the allegation is false. The preliminary inquiry should normally be completed within 90 days of receipt of the complaint.

After the investigation, the agency ordered to conduct the probe has to file its investigation report in the court of appropriate jurisdiction, and a copy of the report has to be filed before the Lokpal. A Bench of at least three members will consider the report and may grant sanction to the Prosecution Wing to proceed against the public servant based on the agency's chargesheet. It may also ask the competent authority to take departmental action or direct the closure of the report. Previously, the authority vested with the power to appoint or dismiss a public servant was the one to grant sanction under Section 197 of the Code of Criminal Procedure and Section 19 of the Prevention of Corruption Act. Now this power will be exercised by the Lokpal, a judicial body. In any case, the Lokpal will have to seek the comments of the ‘competent authority’ as well as the public servant's comments before granting such sanction.

The Lokpal will have a Secretary, who will be appointed by the Lokpal Chairperson from a panel of names prepared by the Union government. The Secretary will be of the rank of Secretary to the Government of India. The Lokpal will have to appoint an Inquiry Wing, headed by a Director of Inquiry, and a Prosecution Wing, headed by a Director of Prosecution. Until these officers are appointed, the government will have to make available officers and staff from its Ministries and Departments to conduct preliminary inquiries and pursue prosecution. The institution will also have to appoint other officers and staff.

Public servants will have to declare their assets and liabilities in a prescribed form. If any assets found in their possession is/are not declared, or if misleading information about these are furnished, it may lead to an inference that assets were acquired by corrupt means. For public servants under the State governments, the States have to set up Lokayuktas to deal with charges against their own officials.

The institution cannot entertain review petition on the order passed by it as there is no provision to review its orders.

== Fundamental duties ==
1. To make jurisdictions against corruption cases with the Lokpal.
2. To judge whether a case is genuine or whether a fake complaint has been made.

Anna Hazare, a Gandhian rights activist, had started a fast unto death at Jantar Mantar in New Delhi demanding the passing of the bill. Hazare called off his hunger strike on 9 April 2011, bringing to an end his 98-hour protest after the government issued a gazette notification constituting a 10-member Joint Committee of government ministers and civil society activists, including him, to draft a bill for the creation of an effective Lokpal. Thousands of people from all over India, especially youth, supported Anna Hazare's cause by attending candle lit marches and conducting online campaigns through social media. (No source)

Anna Hazare on 8 June 2011, declared that he would again fast unto death on 16 August, if the Lokpal bill were not passed by the Parliament of India by 15 August, which is the Independence Day of India.

On 16 June, Civil Society reported that only 15 points, of 71, that they recommended have been agreed to by the Joint Committee consisting of five central ministers. Following differences with the Civil Society, the team of five central ministers decided to forward two drafts of the Lokpal Bill to the Cabinet, one from each side. Anticipating some sort of police action against his fast, intended for 16 August, social activist Anna Hazare said he would ask the Supreme Court to prevent any situation similar to the police crackdown on Baba Ramdev and his supporters at Ramlila Maidan. (No source)

"The government said, ‘we will suppress the agitation of Anna Hazare as had been done in the case of Ramdev’. Is this democracy or autocracy? You cannot suppress.... That is why we will go to the Supreme Court tomorrow," Hazare told reporters, adding "the Constitution has given right to every citizen to lodge a protest. We will launch the agitation from August 16."

On 27 December 2011, the Lokpal bill was passed by the Lok Sabha after a day-long debate and amendments. The Indian Army, the Indian Air Force and the Indian Navy have been kept out of the jurisdiction of the Lokpal. The bill also keeps the CBI independent. (No source)

== Campaign for passage ==
The first version of the Lokpal Bill drafted by the Government of India in 2010 was considered ineffective by some anti-corruption activists from civil society, who came together to draft a citizen's version of the Lokpal Bill later called the Jan Lokpal. Public awareness drives and protest marches were carried out to campaign for the bill. Public support for the Jan Lokpal Bill draft gathered steam after Anna Hazare announced that he would hold an indefinite fast from 5 April 2011 for the passing of the Jan Lokpal bill.

To dissuade Hazare from going on an indefinite hunger strike, the Office of the Prime Minister directed the personnel and law ministries to see how the views of social activists could be included in the bill. On 5 April, the National Advisory Council rejected the Lokpal bill drafted by the government. Union Human Resource Development Minister Kapil Sibal then met social activists Swami Agnivesh and Arvind Kejriwal on 7 April to find ways to bridge differences over the bill. However, no consensus could be reached on 7 April owing to several differences of opinion between the social activists and the Government. (No source)

=== Lokpal and Lokayukta Bill 2011 in Parliament ===
On 27 December 2011, Lok Sabha Parliament winter session passed the Government's Lokpal as the Lokpal and Lokayukta Bill 2011. Before passing this bill, it was introduced in Lok Sabha with key amendments moved. During the 10-hour house debate, a number of opposition parties claimed introduced bill was weak and wanted it withdrawn. Key amendments that were discussed but defeated were following:

- Including corporates, media and NGOs receiving donations
- Bringing CBI under the purview of Lokpal

Amendments that the house agreed upon were:

- Keeping the defence forces and coast guard personnel out of the purview of the anti-graft ombudsman
- Increasing the exemption time of former MPs from five to seven years

This bill was then presented in Rajya Sabha where it hit a logjam.

=== The Lokpal and Lokayuktas Act, 2013 ===
The Lokpal and Lokayuktas Act, 2013, commonly known as The Lokpal Act, is an anti-corruption Act of Indian Parliament in India which "seeks to provide for the establishment of the institution of Lokpal to inquire into allegations of corruption against certain important public functionaries including the prime minister, cabinet ministers, members of parliament, Group A officials of the Central Government and for matters connecting them".

The Bill was tabled in the Lok Sabha on 22 December 2011 and was passed by the House on 27 December as The Lokpal and Lokayuktas Bill, 2011. It was subsequently tabled in the Rajya Sabha on 29 December. After a marathon debate that stretched until midnight of the following day, the vote failed to take place for lack of time. On 21 May 2012, it was referred to a Select Committee of the Rajya Sabha for consideration. It was passed in the Rajya Sabha on 17 December 2013 after making certain amendments to the earlier Bill and in the Lok Sabha the next day. It received assent from President Pranab Mukherjee on 1 January 2014 and came into force from 16 January.

== Criticisms ==
=== Naive approach ===
The activist bill was criticised as being naive in its approach to combating corruption. According to Pratap Bhanu Mehta, President of the Centre for Policy Research Delhi, the bill "is premised on an institutional imagination that is at best naïve; at worst subversive of representative democracy". The very concept of a Lokpal concept received criticism from ex Human Resource Development minister Kapil Sibal in that it would lack accountability, be oppressive and undemocratic.

=== Extra-constitutional ===
Kejriwal rejected the claim of Lokpal being extra-constitutional with the explanation that the body will only investigate corruption offences and submit a charge sheet which would then be tried and prosecuted through trial courts and higher courts, and that other bodies with equivalent powers in other matters exist. The bill also lists clear provisions for the Supreme Court to abolish the Lokpal.

Despite these clarifications, critics feel that the exact judicial powers of Lokpal are rather unclear in comparison with its investigative powers. The bill requires "...members of Lokpal and the officers in the investigation wing of Lokpal shall be deemed to be police officers". Although some supporters have denied any judicial powers of Lokpal, the government and some critics have recognised Lokpal to have quasi-judicial powers.

The bill also states that "Lokpal shall have, and exercise the same jurisdiction powers and authority in respect of contempt of itself as a High court has and may exercise, and, for this purpose, the provisions of the Contempt of Courts Act, 1971 (Central Act 70 of 1971) shall have the effect subject to the modification that the references therein to the High Court shall be construed as including a reference to the Lokpal." Review of proceedings and decisions by Lokpal is prevented in the bill by the statement "...no proceedings or decision of the Lokpal shall be liable to be challenged, reviewed, quashed or called in question in any court of ordinary Civil Jurisdiction." As a result, how the trials will be conducted is unclear in the bill, although the bill outlines requiring judges for special courts, presumably to conduct trials that should be completed within one year. The critics hence express concern that, without judicial review, Lokpal could potentially become an extra-constitutional body with investigative and judicial powers whose decisions cannot be reviewed in regular courts.

=== Scope ===
The matter of whether the Indian Prime Minister and higher judiciary should or should not be prosecutable by the Lokpal remains as one of the major issues of dispute. Anna's own nominee for co-chairing the joint panel Justice Verma, the former Chief Justice of the Supreme Court, has expressed his constitutional objections for including the Prime Minister and higher judiciary under Lokpal. According to him, "this would foul with the basic structure of the constitution".

=== Criticism from the Director of the Central Bureau of Investigation ===
In a presentation before the Standing Committee of the Parliament, the Central Bureau of Investigation strongly argued against its vivisection and merger of its anticorruption wing with the Lokpal, noting that this would seriously cripple the core functioning of the bureau and reduce it to irrelevance. An organisation built over last 60 years comprising competent professionals should not be subsumed under Lokpal. Central Bureau of Investigation officers concede that in some sensitive political cases there is interference from the government, but in respect of an overwhelming majority of cases the Central Bureau of Investigation functions well, unfettered and uninfluenced by extraneous considerations. For this reason there is an ever-increasing demand for CBI investigations from all over the country in respect of important cases.

== See also ==
- Corruption in India
