= Sikkim Lokayukta =

Parliamentary Ombudsman for the state of Sikkim

Agency overview
- Formed: 2012

Jurisdictional structure
- Federal agency: India
- Operations jurisdiction: India
- General nature: Federal law enforcement

Operational structure
- Headquarters: Sikkim Lokayukta.
- Agency executive: Justice A P Subba., Lokayukta Chairperson.

Sikkim Lokayukta is the Parliamentary Ombudsman for the state of Sikkim (India). It is a high level statutory functionary, created to address grievances of the public against ministers, legislators, administration and public servants in issues related to misuse of power, mal-administration and corruption. It was first formed under the Sikkim Lokayukta and Deputy Lokayukta Act, 2012 and approved by the president of India. The Lokpal and Lokayuktas Act, 2013 adopted by Parliament had become law from 16 January 2014 and required each state in India to appoint its Lokayukta within a year. Under the 2013 law, a bench of Lokayukta should consist of judicial and non-judicial members. An Upa-Lokayukta is a deputy to the Lokayukta and assists with her or his work and acts as the in-charge Lokayukta in case the position falls vacant prematurely.

A Lokayukta of the state is appointed to office by the state Governor after consulting the committee consisting of the State Chief Minister, Speaker of the Legislative Assembly, Leader of Opposition, or leader of the largest opposition party in the State Legislature, Chairman of the Legislative Council and Leader of Opposition of Legislative Council and cannot be removed from office except for reasons specified in the Act and will serve the period of five years.

== History and administration ==
The Sikkim Lokayukta Bill, 2017 was passed in the Sikkim Assembly on 29 December 2020 and got approved by the President of India on 16 July 2012 and was effective from 2012. The bill is a tool to create Lokayukta as an autonomous body for checking corruption related complaints in the state. The Bill has similar provisions as Lokpal and Lokayuktas Act,2013 passed by parliament and will cover employees of state government whether working in or out of state but under the control of state government. Sikkim is the third state to create the Law after passing the Act by Central Government and has an annual budget of Rs 2 crore for Lokayukta.

== Oath or affirmation ==
"I, <name>, having been appointed Lokayukta (or Upa-Lokayukta) do swear in the name of God (or solemnly affirm) that I will bear faith and allegiance to the Constitution of India as by law established and I will duly and faithfully and to the best of my ability, knowledge and judgment perform the duties of my office without fear or favour, affection or ill-will."

— First Schedule, Sikkim Lokayukta and Deputy Lokayukta Act-2014

== Powers ==
Sikkim Lokayukta has complete and exclusive authority for enquiring into allegations or complaints against the State Chief Minister, State Deputy Chief Minister, Ministers of the state Government, Leader of Opposition and Government officials of all grades. Lokayukta Act of the state which serves as its tool against corruption covers Chief Ministers, ex-Chief Ministers, Government officials, Ministers, IAS officers and all public servants including from local administration, police, customs and heads of companies, and societies, trusts which are partly funded by state or centre and state government employees working outside the state but under control of state government.

== Appointment and tenure ==
Sikkim Lokayukta is Justice A P Subba, a former Judge of the High Court of Sikkim from 10 July 2020 and will hold office for a term of five years or attaining the age of 70 years whichever is earlier. He is the first judge from his home state to be appointed as Lokayukta. Justice Kalyan Jyoti Sengupta served as Sikkim Lokayukta before Mr. Subba for a period of five years.

== Notable cases ==
1. In 2014, Sikkim Lokayukta on a complaint received against 18 previous ministers of the state Government on allegations of corruption had decided to inquire those.

== See also ==
Lokpal and Lokayukta Act, 2013
