= Tripura Lokayukta =

Parliamentary Ombudsman

Agency overview
- Formed: 2008

Jurisdictional structure
- Federal agency: India
- Operations jurisdiction: India
- General nature: Federal law enforcement

Operational structure
- Headquarters: Tripura Lokayukta.
- Agency executive: KN Bhattacharjee., Lokayukta Chairperson.

Tripura Lokayukta is the Parliamentary Ombudsman for the state of Tripura (India). It is a high level statutory functionary, created to address grievances of the public against ministers, legislators, administration and public servants in issues related to misuse of power, mal-administration and corruption. It was first formed under the Tripura Lokayukta and Deputy Lokayukta Act-2008 and approved by the president of India. With The Lokpal and Lokayuktas Act, 2013 adopted by the Parliament of India coming into force on 16 January 2014, each state in India was required to appoint its Lokayukta within a year. A bench of Lokayukta should consist of judicial and non-judicial members. An Upa-Lokayukta is a deputy to Lokayukta and assists him in his work and acts in-charge Lokayukta in case the position falls vacant prematurely.

A Lokayukta of the state is appointed to office by the state Governor after consulting the committee consisting of State Chief Minister, Speaker of Legislative Assembly, Leader of Opposition, or leader of largest opposition party in State Legislature, Chairman of Legislative Council and Leader of Opposition of Legislative Council and cannot be removed from office except for reasons specified in the Act and will serve the period of five years.

== History and administration ==
The Tripura Lokayukta Bill, 2008 was passed in the Tripura Assembly in 2008 and got approved by President of India on same year. The bill is a tool to create Lokayukta as an autonomous body for checking corruption-related complaints in the state. The Bill has similar provisions as the Lokpal and Lokayuktas Act, 2013 passed by parliament and will cover employees of state government whether working in or out of state but under the control of state government.

== Oath or affirmation ==
"I, <name>, having been appointed Lokayukta (or Upa-Lokayukta) do swear in the name of God (or solemnly affirm) that I will bear faith and allegiance to the Constitution of India as by law established and I will duly and faithfully and to the best of my ability, knowledge and judgment perform the duties of my office without fear or favour, affection or ill-will."

— First Schedule, Tripura Lokayukta and Deputy Lokayukta Act-2008

== Powers ==
Tripura Lokayukta has complete and exclusive authority for enquiring into allegations or complaints against the State Chief Minister, State Deputy Chief Minister, Ministers of the state Government, Leader of Opposition and Government officials of all grades. Lokayukta Act of the state which serves as its tool against corruption covers Chief Ministers, ex-Chief Ministers, Government officials, Ministers, IAS officers and all public servants including from local administration, police, customs and heads of companies, and societies, trusts which are partly funded by state or centre and state government employees working outside state but under control of state government.

== Appointment and tenure ==
Tripura Lokayukta is veteran lawyer KN Bhattacharjee, and will hold office for a term of three years or attaining the age of 70 years whichever is earlier. He is the first lawyer to be appointed as Lokayukta which was earlier held by members serving as judge in High Courts. He is the third person to be appointed as Lokayukta. He was preceded by former judge of Gujarat and Guwahati high courts, Justice Pradip Kumar Sarkar as first Lokayukta in 2012 and Justice Subal Baidya, former judge of Kolkata and Andhra Pradesh high courts, as second Lokayukta till 2017.

== Notable cases ==
In 2021, Tripura Lokayukta in a complaint before it relating to alleged misappropriation of Rs 10.52 crore released by the central government for cultivation in Jatropha issued directions to the state government for a thorough investigation.

== See also ==
- Lokpal and Lokayukta Act, 2013
