= Mohan Lall Shrimal =

Indian judge (born 1923)

Hon'ble Chief Justice (Retd.) Mohan Lall Shrimal

Lokayukta of Rajasthan
- In office 4 January 1985 – 3 January 1990
- Appointed by: Om Prakash Mehra
- Preceded by: K. S. Sidhu
- Succeeded by: P. D. Kudal

2nd Chief Justice of Sikkim High Court
- In office 17 December 1983 – 3 January 1985
- Nominated by: Y. V. Chandrachud
- Appointed by: Zail Singh
- Preceded by: M. S. Gujral; A. M. Bhattacharjee (acting)
- Succeeded by: Jugal Kishore Mohanty; A. M. Bhattacharjee (acting)

Judge of Rajasthan High Court
- In office 7 October 1974 – 16 December 1983
- Nominated by: Ajit Nath Ray
- Appointed by: Fakhruddin A. Ahmed

Personal details
- Born: 4 January 1923
- Education: Maharana Bhupal College, Udaipur; Christian College, Indore; Holkar College, Indore

Mohan Lall Shrimal (born 4 January 1923) is an Indian former judge who served as the chief justice of Sikkim High Court. He hails from Jaipur in Rajasthan state in India. In 2001 he was awarded Maharana Mewar award.

== Early life and career ==
He was born on 4 January 1923 and educated at Maharana Bhupal College, Udaipur, Christian College, Indore and Holkar College, Indore. He enrolled as Pleader in the Mewar High Court at Udaipur in the former Mewar State on 8 February 1948 and Advocate of the Rajasthan High Court at Jodhpur on 20 May 1951. He did Civil, Criminal, Revenue and Taxation and Writs works at Udaipur, Durgapur, Banswara and Jodhpur. He was appointed as Deputy Government Advocate from 1 September 1966 to 24 October 1969 and as Additional Govt. Advocate from 25 October 1969 to 12 July 1973. He was further appointed as Government Advocate-cum-Additional Advocate General of Rajasthan from 13 July 1973 to 30 September 1974.

He was appointed as Additional Judge of the Rajasthan High Court on 7 October 1974 and was made Permanent on 10 May 1976. He was transferred and appointed Chief Justice of Sikkim High Court on 17 December 1983. His appointment as Chief Justice generated significant controversy at that time because it was made after superseding as many as 40 senior judges.

He was appointed as Rajasthan Lokayukta after retirement on 4 January 1985 and served for five years until retirement on 3 January 1990.
