= Lallé =

Lallé may refer to:

- Lallé, Bazèga, Burkina Faso
- Lallé, Boulkiemdé, Burkina Faso
- Lallé, Ganzourgou, Burkina Faso
