= Lallé, Bazèga =

Lallé
- Country: Burkina Faso
- Region: Centre-Sud Region
- Province: Bazèga Province
- Department: Kombissiri Department

Population (2019)
  - Total: 907

Lallé is a village in the Kombissiri Department of Bazèga Province in central Burkina Faso.

Population
Year	Pop.	±%
1985	736	—
2006	738	+0.3%
2019	907	+22.9%
