= Yadav Singh corruption case =

Corruption case in Uttar Pradesh, India

The Yadav Singh corruption case is an alleged event of corruption in the Indian state of Uttar Pradesh. Yadav Singh was the Engineer-in-Chief of the Noida Authority, Greater Noida Industrial Development Authority (GNIDA) and Yamuna Expressway Industrial Development Authority (YEIDA).

It is alleged that the Raids conducted by the Income Tax Department in November 2014 at several locations, including his residence in Sector-51 Noida, showed that Singh owned property disproportionate to his known sources of income.

== Case ==
He was suspended by the Government of Uttar Pradesh and in February 2015 a one-member judicial commission to probe into the multi-crore case was set up the state government. On a Public Interest Litigation filed by activist and advocate Nutan Thakur, in July 2015 Allahabad High Court directed the Central Bureau of Investigation (CBI) to investigate the case stating that the allegations were most serious and the probe was complex.

The Uttar Pradesh government went to the Supreme Court of India against the High Court's order in Nutan Thakur's PIL, however the Supreme Court refused to entertain the government's plea.

In March 2012, Yadav Singh was suspended because a first information report (FIR) filed on 13 January 2012 against him under Prevention of Corruption Act, 1988 at Sector-39 Police station of Noida. Yadav Singh had allegedly executed around 1280 maintenance contracts worth Rs 954 Crore (Rs 9.54 billion) in just a period of 8 days in December 2011. In February 2020 Singh was again arrested by the CBI.

== Yadav Singh ==
Yadav Singh started his career as a Junior Engineer (JE) on 17 March 1980. He is a diploma holder in electrical engineering and has no formal degree in engineering which is must for gazetted officers. Singh was promoted to the post of Assistant Project Engineer (Assistant Engineer level) in 1985 without the requisite engineering degree. Singh was once again elevated in 1995 to the post of Project Engineer (Executive Engineer level) when he did not have an engineering degree.

Before finally being promoted to the post of Engineer-in-Chief, he was working as CME/ Chief Mechanical Engineer (Chief Engineer level) in Noida Authority.

== Family ==
Yadav Singh is married to Kusum Lata and has one son, Sunny and two daughters, Garima Bhushan and Karuna Singh. Sunny used to work as Senior Manager in Greater Noida Industrial Development Authority (GNIDA) until his termination in July 2020.

Garima is married to Shashi Bhushan Lal Susheel, an IAS officer, while Karuna is married to an IPS officer of Jharkhand cadre. In October 2012, Shashi Bhushan Lal Susheel was suspended by the Government of Uttar Pradesh on charges of molestation and attempt to rape in a moving train.
