= Goa Lokayukta =

Anti-corruption Ombudsman for the state of Goa

Agency overview
- Formed: 2011

Jurisdictional structure
- Federal agency: India
- Operations jurisdiction: India
- General nature: Federal law enforcement

Operational structure
- Headquarters: Ground Floor, Altinho, Panaji, Goa 403001.
- Agency executive: Justice A H Joshi.

The Goa Lokayukta is the ombudsman institution of the Indian state of Goa. The Lokayukta is an anti-corruption ombudsman existing in several states of India.

Justice (Retired) Ambadas Joshi is the current Lokayukta of Goa,since 7 May 2021.

== Background ==
In 1966, a report by the Administrative Reforms Commission headed by Morarji Desai recommended the setting up of Lokpal at the federal level and Lokayukta in the states, for the redressal of citizen's grievances.

Goa had its first anti-corruption commission under the Goa Public Men's Corruption (Inquiries and Investigation) Act, 1988. The provisions of this Act were analogous to the Lokayukta Acts of several states. The legislation was enacted to make provision for the constitution of the commission for investigation of, and inquiry into, complaints against public men and for matters connected therewith. Government of India subsequently circulated model Bills on Lokayukta and State Vigilance Commissions to all states in India.

== Journey of the Bill ==
The Goa Lokayukta Bill, 2003 was introduced before the Goa Legislative Assembly in 2003 during the tenure of Manohar Parrikar as the Chief Minister of Goa. It was referred to the Select Committee and the Select Committee's report was adopted by the Goa Legislative Assembly in 2006. The Bill was then finally passed by the Goa Legislative Assembly in 2007. It was sent to the Governor of Goa for his assent on 11 August 2007.

The Governor of Goa reserved it for the assent of the President of India as the proposed legislation was within the ambit of Entry No.45 of the Concurrent List (List-III) of Schedule VII of the Constitution of India. It was examined by the Union Ministries of Law, Home as well as Personnel, Public Grievances and Pensions of the Government of India. These Ministries pointed out towards certain legal infirmities in the Goa Lokayukta Bill, 2003 in context to the Prevention of Corruption Act, 1988, Delhi Special Police Establishment Act, 1946 and the Right to Information Act, 2005. Due to these reservations expressed by several Ministries of the Government of India, the Government of Goa led by Chief Minister Digambar Kamat decided to withdraw the enactment and introduce a new legislation.

Meanwhile, the 2011 Indian anti-corruption movement across India renewed the demand for the institution of the Lokayukta. The then Chief Minister of Goa Digambar Kamat requested the Goa Law Commission to expedite the drafting of a fresh Bill. Hence, the Commission then led by Ramakant Khalap in its fifteenth report suggested a draft Lokayukta Bill. The Goa Lokayukta Bill, 2011 was passed by the Goa Legislative Assembly on 5 October 2011. As the Bill was he members of the Assembly hailed the 2011 Indian anti-corruption movement led by Anna Hazare which led to the revival of the Bill. The then Governor of Goa K. Sankaranarayanan referred back the Bill to the Government of Goa in November 2011 with certain queries. In January 2012, the Governor of Goa referred back the Bill to the Government of Goa for the second time. The Government of Goa sent the Bill for assent to the President of India.

The 2012 Assembly elections led to the ouster of the Digambar Kamat government and Manohar Parrikar became the Chief Minister of Goa. In its election manifesto, the Bharatiya Janata Party led by Parrikar had promised to institute the office of Lokayukta within 100 days of gaining power. The President of India granted her assent to the Goa Lokayukta Bill, 2011 in May 2012. The Rtd. Justice B. Sudershan Reddy was appointed as first Lokayukta of Goa in 2013.

== See also ==
- Andhra Pradesh Lokyukta
- Assam Lokayukta
- Bihar Lokayukta
- Delhi Lokayukta
- Himachal Pradesh Lokayukta
- Karnataka Lokayukta
- Lokayukta
- Lokpal
- Maharashtra Lokayukta
- Tamil Nadu Lokayukta
- Telangana Lokayukta
- The Lokpal and Lokayuktas Act, 2013
- Uttar Pradesh Lokayukta
- West Bengal Lokayukta
