= Assam Lokayukta =

Anti-corruption ombudsman organization in the Indian state of Assam

Agency overview
- Formed: 1986

Jurisdictional structure
- Federal agency: India
- Operations jurisdiction: India
- General nature: Federal law enforcement

Operational structure
- Headquarters: Office of The Lokayukta, Assam, Shaktigarh Path, 2nd Bylane, House No. 15, Bhangagarh, Guwahati 781005
- Agency executive: Hon’ble Mr. Justice Hitesh Kumar Sarma, Upa-Lokayukta, Assam

The Assam Lokayukta is the Parliamentary Ombudsman for the state of Assam (India). It is a high level statutory functionary, created to address grievances of the public against ministers, legislators, administration and public servants in issues related to misuse of power, mal-administration and corruption. It was first formed under the Assam Lokayukta and Upa-Lokayukta Act, and approved by the president of India on 2011. The Lokpal and Lokayukta's Act, 2013 passed by Indian Parliament had become law from 16 January 2014, and required each Indian state to appoint its Lokayukta within a year. A bench of Lokayukta should consist of judicial and non-judicial members. An Upa-Lokayukta is a deputy to the Lokayukta and assists in her or his work and acts as the in-charge Lokayukta in case the position falls vacant prematurely.

A Lokayukta of the state is appointed to office by the state Governor after consulting the committee consisting of State Chief Minister, Speaker of Legislative Assembly, Leader of Opposition, Chairman of Legislative Council and Leader of Opposition of Legislative Council and cannot be removed from office except for reasons specified in the Act and will serve the period of five years.

== Oath or affirmation ==
"I, <name>, having been appointed Lokayuka (or Upa-Lokayukta) do swear in the name of God (or solemnly affirm) that I will bear faith and allegiance to the Constitution of India as by law established and I will duly and faithfully and to the best of my ability, knowledge and judgment perform the duties of my office without fear or favour, affection or ill-will."

— First Schedule, Assam Lokayukta and Upa-Lokayuktas Act, 1986

== Journey of the bill ==
Assam Government had designed and introduced the Assam Lokayukta and Upa-Lokayuktas Act, 1985 to improve the responsibility and accountability services in Public offices by citizens through Investigation of Complaint and grievances against Public functionaries, ministers, legislators and other public servants in the state and after passing in state Legislature the bill received the approval of the Hon’ble President on 12 December 1986 and on 20 January 1989 the Rules were framed under this Act. The Lokpal and Lokayukta Act 2013, makes it compulsory for each state to appoint Lokayukta similar to Lokpal at central level for investigation into complaints of corruption against government officers in public offices.

== Appointment and tenure ==
The Governor has authority for the purpose of conducting investigations to appoint a person as Lokayukta after consultation with the Chief Justice of the Gauhati High Court, the Speaker and the Leader of the Opposition in Assam Legislative Assembly and he will hold office for a term of five years from the date of appointment, and one or more persons as Upa-Lokayukta after consultation with Lokayukta in accordance with the provisions of Act.

Sl. No	NAME OF LOKAYUKTA AND UPA-LOKAYUKTA	HOLDING CHARGE FROM	HOLDING CHARGE TO
1	Mr. Justice T.C Das, Lokayukta	1 Feb 1989	31 Jan 1994
2	Mr. Justice R. K. Manisana Singh, Lokayukta,	10 Feb 1994	21 Mar 1995
3	Mr. Justice D.N. Baruah, Upa-Lokayukta,	1 Mar 2001	28 Feb 2002
4	Mr. Justice P. C. Phukan, Upa-Lokayukta,	3 Mar 2006	30 Nov 2007
5	Mr. Justice D. Biswas, Upa-Lokayukta,	28 April 2010	31 Aug 2012
6	Mr. Justice H. Barua, Upa-Lokayukta,	7 May 2014	31 Oct 2016
7	Mr. Justice C.R. Sarma, Upa-Lokayukta,	31 Oct 2016	

== Powers ==
The organisation has its authorized cells in each and every District Commissioner's office to facilitate people to lodge their complaints locally and avoid visiting its headquarters in Guwahati. Currently as per the draft of the Bill, the existing and previous chief ministers, present and previous ministers, and currently and earlier elected MLAs are covered under the Act. In the year 2011, Chief Minister Tarun Gogoi announced that the Assam Lokayukta Bill will be amended to include the chief minister.

== See also ==
- The Lokpal and Lokayuktas Act, 2013
