= Telangana Lokayukta =

Anti-corruption Ombudsman for the state of Telangana

Coordinates: 17.40278°N 78.47566°E

Agency overview
- Formed: 1983 (43 years ago) (as Andhra Pradesh Lokayukta); 2 June 2014 (12 years ago) (as Telangana Lokayukta)

Jurisdictional structure
- Federal agency (Operations jurisdiction): India
- Operations jurisdiction: India
- Legal jurisdiction: Telangana State
- General nature: Federal law enforcement

Operational structure
- Headquarters: Office of The Lokayukta, H.No.5-9-49, Basheerbagh, Hyderabad.
- Agency executive: Hon’ble Mr. CV Ramulu.

Telangana Lokayukta is the parliamentary ombudsman formed by the erstwhile of Andhra Pradesh under the Andhra Pradesh Lokayukta and Upa-Lokayuktas Act, 83 and adapted by Telangana after getting bifurcated from Andhra Pradesh. The institution was designed to as a high level statutory functionary for the state of Telangana for addressing the public complaints against the state government officials and its administration and is independent of the governing political and public administration. The Act became Law from 1 November 1983. With The Lokpal and Lokayuktas Act, 2013 adopted by the Indian Parliament coming into force on 16 January 2014, each state in India was required to appoint its Lokayukta within a year. The mission of the Institution of Lokayukta is to eradicate the evil of corruption, favouritism, abuse of position and Power among the public functionaries and improve efficiency and to create cleaner image of the top public functionaries and promote fairness and honesty.

The state Governor appoints Lokayukta on recommendation of the committee consisting of the State Chief Minister, Speaker of Legislative Assembly, Leader of Opposition, Chairman of Legislative Council and Leader of Opposition of Legislative Council.

== History and administration ==
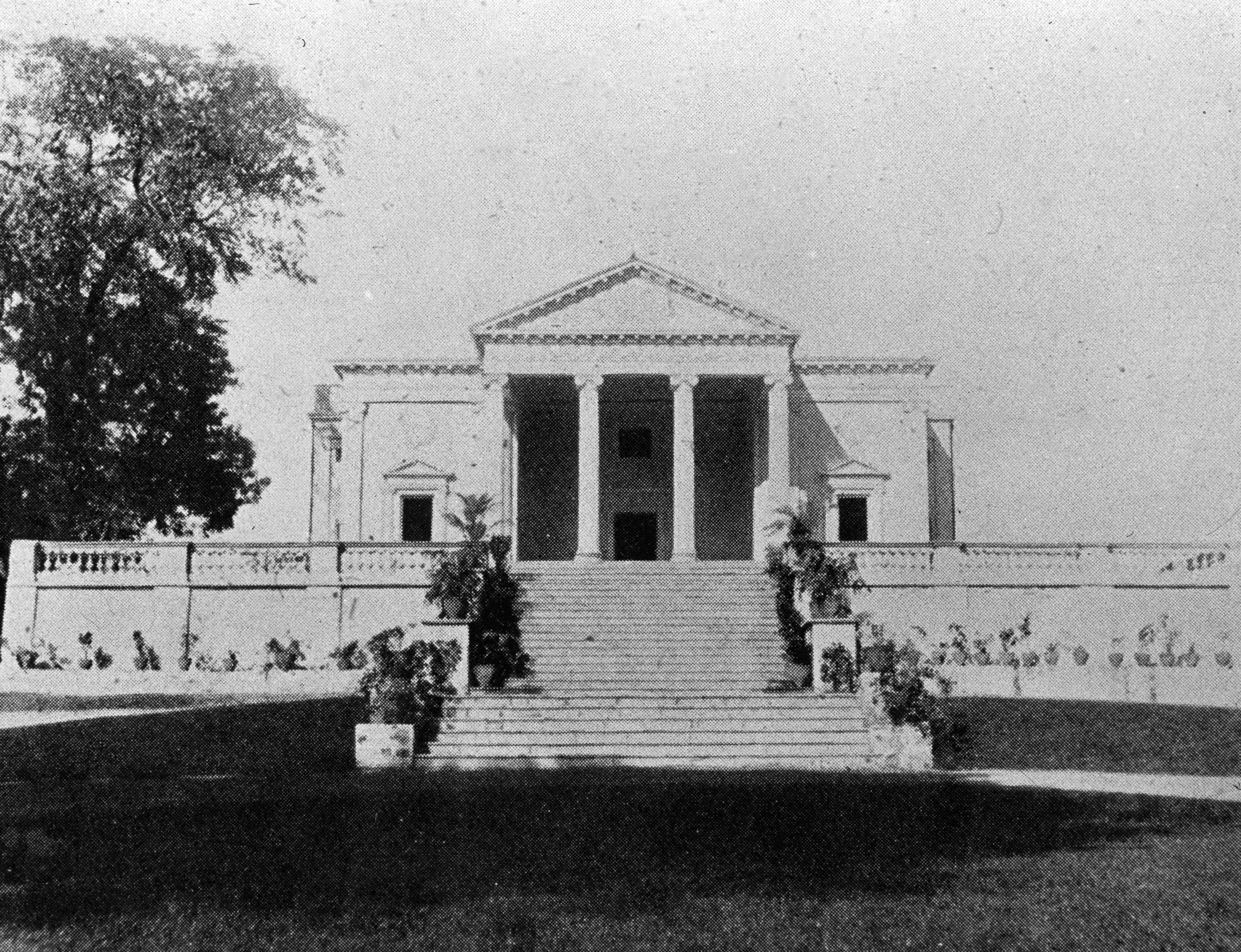
Exterior view of the building as in 1936 after it was restored as a guesthouse by City Improvement Board.

The Lokayukta Act, 1983 passed in erstwhile joint state of Andhra Pradesh in the year 1983 was accepted by Telangana after its formation in the year 2014. The Lokpal and Lokayukta Act 2013, makes it compulsory for each state to appoint Lokayukta similar to Lokpal at central level for investigation into complaints of corruption against government officers in public offices.

In 2019, Telangana Government passed an ordinance that in addition to serving chief Justices or sitting judges even retired Chief Justices or retired Justices can be considered as eligible for appointment for the position as the State Lokayukta.

=== Location ===
The state Lokayukta is currently operating from the erstwhile Andhra Patrika building at Basheerbagh. This building is listed as a heritage structure. The building earlier might have been an outhouse of now demolished Basheer Bagh palace. The building was converted to a guesthouse in 1930s and since 1950s was the office of Jagir Administration and Andhra Patrika. Since 2005 the office of Lokayukta is situated here.

== Powers ==
The institution has independent powers to investigate and prosecute any government official or public servants who are covered by the act and against whom complaint is received for abusing his authority for self interest or causes hurt to anyone or any action done intentionally or following corrupt practices negatively impacting the state or individual.

== Past Lokayuktas and tenure ==
In December 2019, the state Government had appointed retired high court judge CV Ramulu as state Lokayukta and V Niranjan Rao as the Upa-Lokayukta, as the position was vacant since 2014 when the new state was formed.

Index	Name	Holding charge from	Holding charge to
1	Justice Mr.A. Avula Sambasiva Rao	14 November 1983	13 November 1988
2	Justice Mr.A. Seetharam Reddy	12 March 1990	11 March 1995
3	Justice Mr.D.J. Jagannadha Raju	11 May 1995	10 May 2000
4	Justice R. Ramanujam	12 July 2002	11 July 2007
5	Justice S. Ananda Reddy	12 October 2007	11 October 2012

== Notable cases ==
1. In October 2016, on receiving a complaint from Hyderabad city's child rights NGO, 'Balala Hakkula Sangham' (Child Rights Association), the institution had forwarded for enquiry from city's Police regarding a suicide death case of a 13-year-old girl allegedly due to a 68-day fast undertaken by her as part of a particular community ritual.

2. In 2013, the institution had assigned a case and asked for a report from state CID on a petition from few teachers in relation to some teachers getting jobs and promotions on fake certificates.

3. In April 2021, the institution restrained Hyderabad Public School, Ramanthapur from collecting additional fees from its students as the school has collected major part of it giving relief to the students and parents.

== See also ==
- The Lokpal and Lokayuktas Act, 2013
- Karnataka Lokayukta
- Andhra Pradesh Lokayukta
- Delhi Lokayukta
- Tamilnadu Lokayukta
