= West Bengal Lokayukta =

Parliamentary Ombudsman for the state of West Bengal

West Bengal

Agency overview
- Formed: 2003

Jurisdictional structure
- Federal agency: India
- Operations jurisdiction: India
- General nature: Federal law enforcement

Operational structure
- Headquarters: Office of The Lokayukta, Kolkata, West Bengal.
- Agency executive: Justice (retd.) Rabindranath Samanta

Website
- https://lokayukta.wb.gov.in/

West Bengal Lokayukta is the Parliamentary Ombudsman for the state of West Bengal, India. It is a high level statutory functionary, created to address grievances of the public against ministers, legislators, administration and public servants in issues related to misuse of power, mal-administration and corruption. It was first formed under the West Bengal Lokayukta and Upa-Lokayukta Act in 2003. With The Lokpal and Lokayuktas Act, 2013 adopted by the Indian Parliament coming into force on 16 January 2014, each Indian state was required to appoint its Lokayukta within a year. A bench of Lokayukta should consist of judicial and non-judicial members. An Upa-Lokayukta is a deputy to Lokayukta and assists him in his work and acts in-charge Lokayukta in case the position falls vacant before time.

A Lokayukta of the state is appointed to office by the state Governor after consulting the committee consisting of State Chief Minister, Speaker of Legislative Assembly, Leader of Opposition, Chairman of Legislative Council and Leader of Opposition of Legislative Council and cannot be removed from office except for reasons specified in the Act and will serve the period of five years.

== History and Administration ==
West Bengal Lokayukta and Upa-Lokayukta was approved by its Legislative Assembly in 2003. The state Lokayukta had been approved in years 2004, 2007 and 2018 for

- Investigation against members referred as "public servants" in the Act, needs the permission of the State Government.
- State Parliamentary Affairs minister had been included in the committee formed for the selection of new Lokayukta
- inclusion of High Court judge as eligibility for Lokayukta in addition to "potential Supreme Court judge".
- Removal of Upa-Lokayukta position.

In the year 2018, the Act had been amended to keep the Chief Minister out of the purview of Lokayukta except in special cases after approval from State Legislature with two-third members present and voting in its favour. As per the Act, for initiating inquiry against any sitting member of Legislature Assembly permission from Assembly Speaker is needed.

== Oath or affirmation ==
"I, <name>, having been appointed Lokayukta (or Upa-Lokayukta) do swear in the name of God (or solemnly affirm) that I will bear faith and allegiance to the Constitution of India as by law established and I will duly and faithfully and to the best of my ability, knowledge and judgment perform the duties of my office without fear or favour, affection or ill-will."

— First Schedule, West Bengal Lokayukta and Upa-Lokayuktas Act, 2003

== Powers ==
Lokayukta has independent powers to investigate and prosecute any government official or public servants, who are covered by the act and against whom the complaint is received for abusing his authority for self interest or causes hurt to anyone or any action done intentionally or following corrupt practices negatively impacting the state or individual. However, the state Chief Minister is exempted from the Act in issues relating to Governance, nominations for police officials and bureaucratic staff. The State Chief Minister is covered for 58 subjects of the State List after getting two-thirds majority approval from members present and voting for it in Legislature Assembly. Once a complaint is received on allegations of corruption, wrong use of authority and misdeeds by any of public functionaries who may include any ministers in the Government and members of Legislature Assembly, Lokayukta has the power to recommend enquiry to necessary authorities and prosecute, if proven.

Appointments relating to state police, deployment of security forces in the state and any other emergency situations specified in the Act are regarded as public order.

== Appointment and Tenure ==
The first Lokayukta of the state was retired Calcutta High Court judge Samaresh Bandyopadhyay, from the year 2006 to 2009.

In year 2018, Ashim Kumar Roy, retired Calcutta HC judge, was appointed as the Lokayukta. He was reappointed for a second term in 2022. In December 2025, retired Calcutta HC judge Rabindranath Samanta was appointed the Lokayukta.

== See also ==
- The Lokpal and Lokayuktas Act, 2013
- Goa Lokayukta
- Karnataka Lokayukta
- Delhi Lokayukta
- Himachal Pradesh Lokayukta
