= Himachal Pradesh Lokayukta =

Parliamentary ombudsman for Himachal Pradesh, India

Agency overview
- Formed: 2014

Jurisdictional structure
- Federal agency: India
- Operations jurisdiction: India
- General nature: Federal law enforcement

Operational structure
- Headquarters: Lokyukta, Himachal Pradesh, Pines Grove Building, Shimla-171002.
- Agency executive: NA

Himachal Pradesh Lokayukta acts as the parliamentary ombudsman for the state of Himachal Pradesh. It is formed as a high level statutory functionary formed by state of Himachal Pradesh under the Himachal Pradesh Lokayukta and Upa-Lokayuktas Act, 2014. The position is helpful in enhancing the standard of services in Public Administration through fast track investigations of complaints and grievances by any member of public against state ministers, legislators and other public servants. With The Lokpal and Lokayuktas Act, 2013 adopted by the Parliament of India coming into force on 16 January 2014, each state in India was required to appoint its Lokayukta within a year. A bench of Lokayukta should consist of judicial and non-judicial members.

After getting the recommendation of the committee consisting of State Chief Minister, Speaker of Legislative Assembly, Leader of Opposition, Chairman of Legislative Council and Leader of Opposition of Legislative Council the Lokayukta of a state is appointed by the Governor. He cannot be removed from office except in cases of misbehaviour or any other reasons specified in the Act he cannot and the term of service will be for five years.

== History and Administration ==
Himachal Pradesh was one of the few states which established Lokayukta in 1983 but formally got President's approval after the Himachal Pradesh Legislature passed Himachal Pradesh Lokayukta Bill, 2014. The institution had been finalised as a single member body than the proposed multi-member set up planned by earlier Governments was not accepted by Central Government. The single member body with powers of Contempt of Court was suggested by Committee headed by Revenue Minister Kaul Singh Thakur and members from Vidhan Soudha and amended to include Chief Minister, his council of Ministers and other public officials and functionaries. For conducting inquiry on any complaint received relating to offenses covered under the Act from any member of the public against persons covered in the Act, the bill proposed the inclusion of a Director of inquiry heading the Inquiry Department.

The State Lokayukta Act specifies for the maintenance of its receipts and payments and other requisite records as per the rules of Himachal Pradesh Financial Rules, 2009. In addition the institution has to maintain the record of transfer orders of different classes of employees of the Government. As per the Act, the Lokayukta has to furnish details of a number of complaints registered, details of enquiries and investigations conducted, prosecutions approved, charge-sheet filed in a specified form every six months in the month of July and January to the State Government.

== Oath or affirmation ==
Following is the oath of Lokayukta as per the Act.

"I, <name>, having been appointed Lokayukta (or Upa-Lokayukta) do swear in the name of God (or solemnly affirm) that I will bear faith and allegiance to the Constitution of India as by law established and I will duly and faithfully and to the best of my ability, knowledge and judgment perform the duties of my office without fear or favour, affection or ill-will."

— First Schedule, The Himachal Pradesh Lokayukta and Upa-Lokayuktas Act, 2014

== Powers ==
Lokayukta Act passed by Himachal Pradesh Government in 2014 added powers of Contempt of Court. The Act had been amended to include Chief Minister and Ministers under him and any other public functionaries against whom any complaint for corruption or any abuse of power during service is received. Any member from the public can file the complaint and the official will be prosecuted after the formal investigation is done. Lokayukta has independent powers to investigate and prosecute any government official or public servants who are covered by the act and against whom the complaint is received for abusing his authority for self interest or causes hurt to anyone or any action done intentionally or following corrupt practices negatively impacting the state or individual. Once a complaint is received on allegations of corruption, wrong use of authority and misdeeds by any of public functionaries who may include the Chief Minister, Ministers under him and members of Legislature Assembly, Lokayukta has power to recommend enquiry to necessary authorities and prosecute, if proven.

Lokayukta Rules were amended by Himachal Pradesh Government making it compulsory for every public servant specified in the Act, to file their annual return of assets and liabilities in form 6 before 31 July of each year before the competent authority.

== Appointment and Tenure ==
The Lokayukta bill of Himachal Pradesh qualifies any serving judge or former judge of Supreme Court or Chief Justice of a High Court to head the one-member Lokayukta. He/She can hold office for five years or attaining the age of 70 years whichever is earlier.

== See also ==
- The Lokpal and Lokayuktas Act, 2013
- Goa Lokayukta
- Delhi Lokayukta
- Telangana Lokayukta
- West Bengal Lokayukta
