= Lokayukta =

Anti-corruption ombudsman organization in the Indian states

The Lokayukta (also Lok Ayukta; lokāyukta, "civil commissioner") is an Indian Parliamentary Ombudsman who may be appointed for each of the State Governments of India. The role was introduced by the Lokpal and Lokayuktas Act, 2013 to quickly address the working of the government or its administration (public servants). Once appointed, a Lokayukta cannot be dismissed or transferred by the government, and can only be removed if the state assembly adopts an impeachment motion.

The Lokayukta mainly publicizes corruption among politicians and government officials. Many acts of the Lokayukta have resulted in criminal or other consequences for those charged.

== Appointment ==
A Lokayukta is appointed by the Governor of the State, through nomination by its Chief Minister (in consensus with Chief justice of the State High Court, Leaders of the Opposition in the Legislative Assembly, and Legislative Council, Speaker of the Legislative Assembly and Chairman of the Legislative Council). Once appointed, the Lokayukta cannot be dismissed nor transferred by the government, and can only be removed by passing an impeachment motion by the state assembly. Any person who is a judge or a retired Chief Justice or a retired judge of the High Court is eligible to be appointed as a Lokayukta. In most states, the term of a Lokayukta is five years or until they attain 65 years of age, whichever is earlier.

== History ==
In October 1966, the Administrative Reforms Commission, led by Morarji Desai, submitted an interim report to the Prime Minister. It recommended the establishment of a Lokayukta in each state to address citizens' grievances and improve public administration. At the time, existing mechanisms, such as courts and departmental authorities were considered inadequate for tackling corruption and misconduct by public officials.

Based on the recommendation, the Government of India introduced a bill in 1968 to create the institutions of the Lokayukta in the states and Lokpal at the national level, modeled after the Ombudsman Institution. Although the bill passed in the Lok Sabha, it did not pass in the Rajya Sabha. Despite this, the proposal inspired several states to enact their own Lokayukta laws, although the provisions varied widely.

Maharashtra became the first state to formally establish the institution with the Lokayukta and Upa-Lokayuktas Act of 1971. This was soon followed by similar legislation in several other states (Odisha, Rajasthan, Bihar, Uttar Pradesh, Karnataka, Madhya Pradesh, Andhra Pradesh, Gujarat, Kerala, Tamil Nadu) and the union territory of Delhi.

In the state of Haryana, activist Naresh Kadyan filed a public interest litigation and later a contempt of court petition due to the government's failure to appoint a Lokayukta.

However, the powers and responsibilities of the Lokayuktas still differed from state to state, prompting efforts to standardize them. To address the lack of uniformity, the 1st All India Lokayukta and Upa-Lokayuktas Conference was held in Shimla in 1986, where it was agreed that there should be consistency across states. This call for uniformity was reinforced at a subsequent conference in Bhopal in October 2010, and there were plans to achieve this through central legislation.

Timeline	Sequence of Events
1963	Concept first considered during a parliamentary discussion on budgetary allocation for the Law ministry.
1966	Administrative Reforms Commission headed by Shri Morarji Desai gives its first report on the problems of addressing citizens' grievances against the administration. The report recommends the establishment of the Lokayukta and the Lokpal institutions at the State and the Central Governments to investigate grievances against the governments and public servants. It also recommends that it act as an independent entity.
1968	Lokpal Bill first introduced into the parliament but is not passed. (Eight more unsuccessful attempts were made between 1968 and 2011). The State of Odisha passes the bill, but is able to establish this post only later in 1983.
1971	Maharashtra passes the bill in its assembly successfully.
1972	Maharashtra implements this post, bringing it into effect on 25 October 1972, becoming the first ever government in India to establish the Lokayukta.
1983	Odisha establishes the office of the Lokayukta (Act passed in 1971). A few other states follow.
2002	M. N. Venkatachaliah heads a commission recommending the appointment of the Lokpal and Lokayuktas; The commission also recommends that the PM be kept out of its authority.
2005	The second Administrative Reforms Commission headed by Veerappa Moily, presses for establishing the Lokpal without delay.
2011	Anna Hazare leads India's anti-corruption movement demanding that the Government immediately address the issue of corruption; presses for a Lokpal. Headed by Pranab Mukherjee, a committee of Ministers is formed to examine the Lokpal bill and make recommendations for its implementation.
2013	Lokpal Bill passes in both houses of the Parliament, and formally becomes the Lokpal and Lokayukta Act.
2016	The Government makes amendments to the Act mandating public officers, their spouses and dependent children to declare and file their assets & liabilities every year.

== In Indian states ==
Lokayukta/Lokayog	Incumbent
Andhra Pradesh Lokayukta	Justice P. Lakshman Reddy
Arunachal Pradesh Lokayukta	Justice Prashanta Kumar Saikia
Assam Lokayukta	Justice C. R. Sarma
Bihar Lokayukta	vaccant
Chhattisgarh Lokayog	T. P. Sharma
Delhi Lokayukta	Justice Harish Chandra Mishra
Goa Lokayukta	Justice Prafulla Kumar Mishra
Gujarat Lokayukta	Justice Rajesh Shukla
Haryana Lokayukta	Hari Pal Verma
Himachal Pradesh Lokayukta	C. B. Barowalia
Jharkhand Lokayukta	Justice D. N. Upadhyay
Karnataka Lokayukta	Justice P. Vishwanatha Shetty (Lokayukta) Justice Narayanappa Ananda (Upa-Lokayukta) Retd. High Court Judge B S Patil
Kerala Lokayukta	Justice Cyriac Joseph (Lokayukta), Justice A. K. Basheer (Upa-Lokayukta), Justice Babu Mathew P. Joseph (Upa-Lokayukta)
Madhya Pradesh Lokayukta	Justice Naresh Kumar Gupta
Maharashtra Lokayukta	Sanjay Bhatia (Upa-Lokayukta and Lokayukta-in-Charge)
Manipur Lokayukta	Justice (Retd.) T. Nandakumar Singh
Meghalaya Lokayukta	Pranoy Kumar Musahary
Mizoram Lokayukta	C. Lalsawta
Nagaland Lokayukta	Justice Uma Nath Singh
Odisha Lokayukta	Justice Ajit Singh
Punjab Lokayukta	Justice Vinod Kumar Sharma
Rajasthan Lokayukta	Justice Pratap Krishna Lohara
Sikkim Lokayukta	Justice Anand Prakash Subba
Tamil Nadu Lokayukta	P. Devadass
Telangana Lokayukta	Justice (Retd.) C. V. Ramulu
Tripura Lokayukta	Justice Subal Baidya
Uttar Pradesh Lokayukta	Justice Sanjay Mishra
Uttarakhand Lokayukta	Vacant
West Bengal Lokayukta	Justice (Retd.) Rabindranath Samanta

The Arunachal Pradesh Assembly passed a Lokayukta bill on 4 March 2014 and the Mizoram Assembly in March 2019. In Tamil Nadu, the Lokayukta Act was enacted on 13 July 2018 and established on 13 November 2018. There are no Lokayuktas in Jammu and Kashmir and Puducherry.

=== Constitutional Amendment for Effectiveness ===
An amendment to the Constitution has been proposed to implement the Lokayukta uniformly across Indian states. The proposed changes will make the institution of Lokayukta uniform across the country as a three-member body, headed by a retired Supreme Court judge or high court chief justice and comprising the state vigilance commissioner and a jurist or an eminent administrator as other members.

== Jurisdiction ==
The Lokayukta is established to investigate complaints against public functionaries, including politicians and government officials. Each state defines the jurisdiction and powers of its Lokayukta through a separate state act.

Generally, the Lokayuktas jurisdiction covers:

- Ministers, including the Chief Minister (in many states)
- Members of Legislative Assembly (MLAs), Members of Legislative Councils (MLCs)
- State government officials, (including IAS, IPS, and other state service officers)
- Employees of public sector undertakings, local bodies, and autonomous institutions funded or controlled by the state government.

The exact powers and processes of Lokayuktas vary because each state passes its own Lokayukta Act, defining the scope of authority, jurisdiction, and procedural rules specific to that state.

== Reforms ==
In November 2012, after the conclusion of the 11th All India Lokayukta Conference, as many as 16 Lokayuktas sent several recommendations to the Government of India. The recommendations were:

- Make the Lokayukta the nodal agency for receiving all corruption complaints.
- Accord the Lokayukta jurisdiction over State-level probe agencies.
- Bring bureaucrats under the ambit of the Lokayuktas.
- Accord powers of search and seizure and the power to initiate contempt proceedings.
- Provide the Lokayukta administrative and financial autonomy.
- Bring Non-Governmental Organisations (NGO) funded by the government under the Lokayuktas jurisdiction.

== Impact ==
In 2021, a report of Retd. Justice Santosh Hegde, the then incumbent Lokayukta of Karnataka, resulted in the unseating of the Chief Minister of Karnataka B. S. Yeddyurappa from his position.

== See also ==
- The Lokpal and Lokayuktas Act, 2013
- Lokpal
- Citizen's Charter and Grievance Redressal Bill, 2011
- Jan Lokpal Bill
- 2011 Indian anti-corruption movement
