= Chhattisgarh Lokayog =

Parliamentary Ombudsman for the state of Chhattisgarh

Agency overview
- Formed: 2002

Jurisdictional structure
- Federal agency: India
- Operations jurisdiction: India
- General nature: Federal law enforcement

Operational structure
- Headquarters: Lok Ayog Office, Near Kalibadi Chowk, Raipur Pin 492001.
- Agency executive: Hon’ble Justice TP Sharma[., Lokayukta

Chhattisgarh Lokayog is the Parliamentary Ombudsman for the state of Chhattisgarh (India). It is a high level statutory functionary, created to address grievances of the public against ministers, legislators, administration and public servants in issues related to misuse of power, mal-administration and corruption. It was first formed under the Chhattisgarh Lok Ayog Act, 2002 and approved by the president of India. The Lokpal and Lokayukta's Act, 2013 adopted by the Parliament of India had become law from 16 January 2014 and required each Indian state to appoint its Lokayukta within a year. The 2013 law required that a bench of Lokayukta should consist of judicial and non-judicial members. An Upa-Lokayukta is a deputy to the Lokayukta and assists him in her or his work and acts as the in-charge Lokayukta if the position falls vacant prematurely.

A Lokayukta of the state is appointed to office by the state Governor after consulting the committee consisting of State Chief Minister, Speaker of Legislative Assembly, Leader of Opposition, or leader of largest opposition party in State Legislature, Chairman of Legislative Council and Leader of Opposition of Legislative Council and cannot be removed from office except for reasons specified in the Act and will serve the period of five years.

== History and administration ==
Chhattisgarh Lokayog Act-2002 was passed in the Chhattisgarh Assembly and was effective from year 2002. As per the Act, the Lokayog will form an authority or authorities who shall investigate the complaints of misconduct by public servants after receipt of complaint by it. The Act makes provision for completion of enquiry within 3 months on a case of corruption referred to the Government by Lokayog. The Act has been passed to create the position as two member institution with Lokayukt Chief being from Judicial background and Lok Ayukt being from bureaucracy. Chhattisgarh LokAyog had introduced a system of penalties against persons filing wrong complaints for cases covered under Chhattisgarh Lok Ayog Act, 2002 after giving them an opportunity of hearing to prove the facts of case. Penalty amount have to be deposited in the Lok Ayog office, Raipur.

In 2013, on a complaint referred by Chhattisgarh Lokayukta, Chhattisgarh Government in 2013 had set up Enquiry Committees to probe corruption allegations against its employees.

== Oath or affirmation ==
"I, <name>, having been appointed Lokayuka (or Upa-Lokayukta) do swear in the name of God (or solemnly affirm) that I will bear faith and allegiance to the Constitution of India as by law established and I will duly and faithfully and to the best of my ability, knowledge and judgment perform the duties of my office without fear or favour, affection or ill-will."

— First Schedule, Chhattisgarh Lokayog Act-2002

== Powers ==
Chhattisgarh Lokayog has complete and exclusive authority for enquiring into allegations or complaints against the State Chief Minister, State Deputy Chief Minister, Ministers of the state Government, Leader of Opposition and Government officials. The institution has powers to investigate and prosecute any government official or public servants who are covered by the act and abuses his authority for his self interest or causes hurt to anyone or any action done intentionally or following corrupt practices negatively impacting the state or individual.

== Appointment and tenure ==
Lokayog of Chhattisgarh is Justice TP Sharma who will succeed Justice Shambhu Nath Srivastava, a former retired judge Allahabad High Court and will head a two member team with a term of five years or reaching of the age of 70 years, whichever is earlier.

Chhattisgarh Lok Ayog Chairperson will be appointed by Governor along with other members who are recommended by a committee headed by Chief Minister and other members being Speaker of Assembly and Opposition Leader in Assembly, or elected leader of the largest opposition party in the Assembly.

== Notable cases ==
Chhattisgarh Lokayog after receiving a complaint from the son of a senior BJP leader in a case relating to contract allocation of a major irrigation canal to a private firm based in Hyderabad, had issued notices to state Chief Minister Ajit Jogi and Chief Secretary Arun Kumar along with four Government officials from the state.

In year 2016, Chhattisgarh Lokayog had complaints registered against 20 IAS officers and 2 IFS officers as declared by state Chief Minister in state legislature in response to a question from state Congress Chief.

In 2020, Chhattisgarh Lokayog had a pending case against suspended General Manager Sanjay Singh from Chhattisgarh Tourism Board (CTB) on complaints relating to corruption.

== See also ==
- Lokpal and Lokayukta Act, 2013
- Goa Lokayukta
- Karnataka Lokayukta
- Madhya Pradesh Lokayukta
- Gujarat Lokayukta
