= Andhra Pradesh Lokayukta =

Anti-corruption Ombudsman for the state of Andhra Pradesh

Agency overview
- Formed: 1983

Jurisdictional structure
- Federal agency: India
- Operations jurisdiction: India
- General nature: Federal law enforcement

Operational structure
- Headquarters: Institution of Lokayukta, H.No.96/3-72-124-1, PRASAD'S COMPLEX, Santosh nagar, Kurnool -518006.
- Agency executive: Justice T. Mallikarjuna Rao

Andhra Pradesh Lokayukta has been formed as the parliamentary ombudsman by the Government of Andhra Pradesh under the Andhra Pradesh Lokayukta and Upa-Lokayuktas Act, 83. Its institution acts as the high-level statutory functionary for the state of Andhra Pradesh and created independent of the governing political and public administration to address the public grievances against the state government and its administration. It came into force on 1 November 1983. It functions as a public instrument against corruption and other malpractices by public servants and government authorities of the state.

A Lokayukta of the state is appointed to office by the state Governor after consulting a committee consisting of State Chief Minister, Speaker of Legislative Assembly, Leader of Opposition, Chairman of Legislative Council and Leader of Opposition of Legislative Council and will serve the period of five years.

== History and administration ==
The institution of Lokayukta was set up in the state of Andhra Pradesh in 1983. through its Lokayukta Act.

In 2014 Andhra Pradesh was bifurcated into two states, Andhra Pradesh and Telangana.

The Assembly of the new state of Andhra Pradesh approved that in addition to only serving Chief Justices or sitting judges even retired Chief Justices or retired Justices can be considered eligible for appointment as the State Lokayukta. This was done by passing the amended Andhra Pradesh Lokayukta Amendment Bill, 2019.

Lokayukta of Andhra Pradesh is administered by its Registrar who is also its head of department. Its administrative system has four branches, namely Administration, Judicial, Legal and Investigation.

The state Lokayukta is currently operating from the Government Building situated in Kurnool, Andhra Pradesh.

Due to the rapid spread of COVID-19 cases, the Lokayukta of Andhra Pradesh asked the petitioners and government employees to submit petitions, reports online or by post.

== Notable cases ==
- The Institution received 448 complaints in 15 days between 15 September 2019 and 30 September 2019.
- In one of the landmark judgements the Lokayukta after appointment also ordered a series of strict measures on organised loan syndicates in co-operative banks in the state.
- In 2013, the Institution observed that one of the traditional medicines administered by private people should not be supported by the State Government as it does not have a scientific value.
- In one of its observations in year 2021, the institution expressed that the employees of medical, health and treasury offices combined and created 61 dummy people who are not physically available and fraudulently booking salaries in their names for several years.

== Appointments and tenure ==
The Governor of the state appointed Justice P Lakshmana Reddy as the first Lokayukta of bifurcated Andhra Pradesh on 15 September 2019.

Following is the list and tenure of various Lokayuktas of the state:

Index	Name	Holding charge from	Holding charge to
1	Justice Avula Sambasiva Rao	14.11.1983	13.11.1988
2	Justice A. Seetharam Reddy	12.03.1990	11.03.1995
3	Justice D. J. Jagannadha Raju	11.05.1995	10.05.2000
4	Justice R. Ramanujam	12.07.2002	11.07.2007
5	Justice S. Ananda Reddy	12.10.2007	11.10.2012
6	Justice B. Subhashan Reddy	12.10.2012	11.10.2017
7	Justice P. Lakshmana Reddy	15.09.2019	14.09.2024
8	Justice T. Mallikarjuna Rao	25.08.2026	Present

== Powers ==
The institution has powers to investigate and prosecute any government official or public servants who are covered by the act and abuses his authority for his self interest or causes hurt to anyone or any action done intentionally or following corrupt practices negatively impacting the state or individual.

== Related articles ==
The Lokpal and Lokayuktas Act, 2013

Goa Lokayukta

Delhi Lokayukta

Chhattisgarh Lokayog

Gujarat Lokayukta
