= Lokpal =

Ombudsman agency of India

- लोकपाल
- 'मा गृधः कस्यस्विद्धनम्' (“Do Not Covet Anyone's Wealth”)

Agency overview
- Formed: 19 March 2019; 7 years ago
- Type: Ombudsman agency
- Status: Active
- Headquarters: New Delhi, India
- Agency executive: Ajay Manikrao Khanwilkar, (Chairperson)
- Child Agency: Lokayukta
- Website: https://lokpal.gov.in

A Lokpal (Sanskrit: लोकपाल lokapāla, "Defender of People" or "People's Friend") is an anti-corruption authority or body of ombudsman that represents the public interest in the Republic of India. The current Chairperson of Lokpal is Ajay Manikrao Khanwilkar. The Lokpal has jurisdiction over central government, anyone who is or has been Prime Minister, or a Minister in the Union government, or a Member of Parliament, as well as officials of the Union government under Groups A, B, C and D. Also covered are chairpersons, members, officers and directors of any board, corporation, society, trust or autonomous body either established by an Act of Parliament or wholly or partly funded by the Centre. It also covers any society or trust or body that receives foreign contributions above ₹10 lakh. to inquire into allegations of corruption against its public functionaries and for matters connected to corruption. The Lokpal and Lokayuktas Act was passed in 2013 with amendments in parliament, following the Jan Lokpal movement led by Anna Hazare in 2010. The Lokpal is responsible for enquiring into corruption charges at the national level while the Lokayukta performs the same function at the state level. The age of Lokpal (chairperson or member) on the date of assuming office as the chairperson or a member should not be less than 45 years.

== History ==
The term "Lokpal" was coined by Dr. L.M.Singhvi in 1963. The concept of a constitutional ombudsman was first proposed in parliament by Law Minister Ashoke Kumar Sen in the early 1960s. The first Jan Lokpal Bill was proposed by Adv Shanti Bhushan in 1968 and passed in the 4th Lok Sabha in 1969, but did not pass through the Rajya Sabha. Subsequently, 'lokpal bills' were introduced in 1971, 1977, 1985, again by Ashoke Kumar Sen, while serving as Law Minister in the Rajiv Gandhi cabinet, and again in 1989, 1996, 1998, 2001, 2005 and in 2008, yet they were never passed. Forty five years after its first introduction and after ten failed attempts, the Lokpal Bill was finally enacted in India on 18 December 2013 after the tenth attempt. President gave his assent to Lokpal and Lokayuktas Act on 1 January 2014.

The Lokpal Bill provides for the filing, with the ombudsman, of complaints of corruption against the prime minister, other ministers, MPs, and group A, B, C and D officers of the central government. The first Administrative Reforms Commission (ARC) recommended the enacting of the Office of a Lokpal, convinced that such an institution was justified, not only for removing the sense of injustice from the minds of citizens, but also to instill public confidence in the efficiency of the administrative machinery.

Following this, the Lokpal Bill was, for the first time, presented during the fourth Lok Sabha in 1968, and was passed there in 1969. However, while it was pending in the Rajya Sabha, the Lok Sabha was dissolved, and thus the bill lapsed.

The bill was revived several times in subsequent years, including in 2011. Each time, after the bill was introduced to the House, it was referred to a committee for improvements, to a joint committee of parliament, or to a departmental standing committee of the Home Ministry. Before the government could take a final stand on the issue, the house was dissolved again. Several conspicuous flaws were found in the 2008 draft of the Lokpal Bill. The basic idea of a lokpal is borrowed from the Office of the Ombudsman, which has the Administrative Reforms Committee of a Lokpal at the centre, and Lokayukta in the states.

Anna Hazare started agitation in Delhi to get this bill passed, and it did pass on 27 December 2011, around 9:30, with some modifications. These were proposed as the Jan Lokpal Bill. However, Hazare and his team, as well as other political parties, claimed that the Lokpal Bill passed was weak, and would not serve its intended purpose. So the proposed bill by the ruling Congress Party has yet to be accepted in the Rajya Sabha. As of 29 December 2011, the bill has been deferred to the next parliamentary session, amid much controversy and disruption by the LJP, RJD and SP parties. The media at large, and the opposition parties, claimed the situation had been staged.

The apex Institution primarily created to inquire and investigate complaints relating to allegation of corruption involving public functionaries and elected representatives, finally was formed in March 2019 with the appointment of its Chairperson and members.

== Qualification ==
As of March 2019, and ever since the related Act of Parliament was passed in India. Retired Supreme Court judge Pinaki Chandra Ghose is appointed as the first Lokpal of India by a committee consisting of Prime Minister Narendra Modi and Chief Justice of India Ranjan Gogoi and Speaker of the Lok Sabha Sumitra Mahajan on 23 March 2019 whereas the members are appointed w.e.f 27 March 2019.

According to The Lokpal and Lokayuktas Act, 2013, the organisation consists of one Chairperson and a maximum of eight other members.

- Out of those eight members four members are judicial members who are or have been a Judge of the Supreme Court or a Chief Justice of a High Court
- Remaining four members being non-judicial members are people of impeccable integrity and outstanding ability having special knowledge and expertise of not less than twenty-five years in the matters relating to anti-corruption policy, public administration, vigilance, finance including insurance and banking, law and management.
- Minimum fifty per cent of the Members will be from Scheduled Castes / Scheduled Tribe / Other Backward Classes / Minorities and women.

== Jan Lokpal Bill movement ==
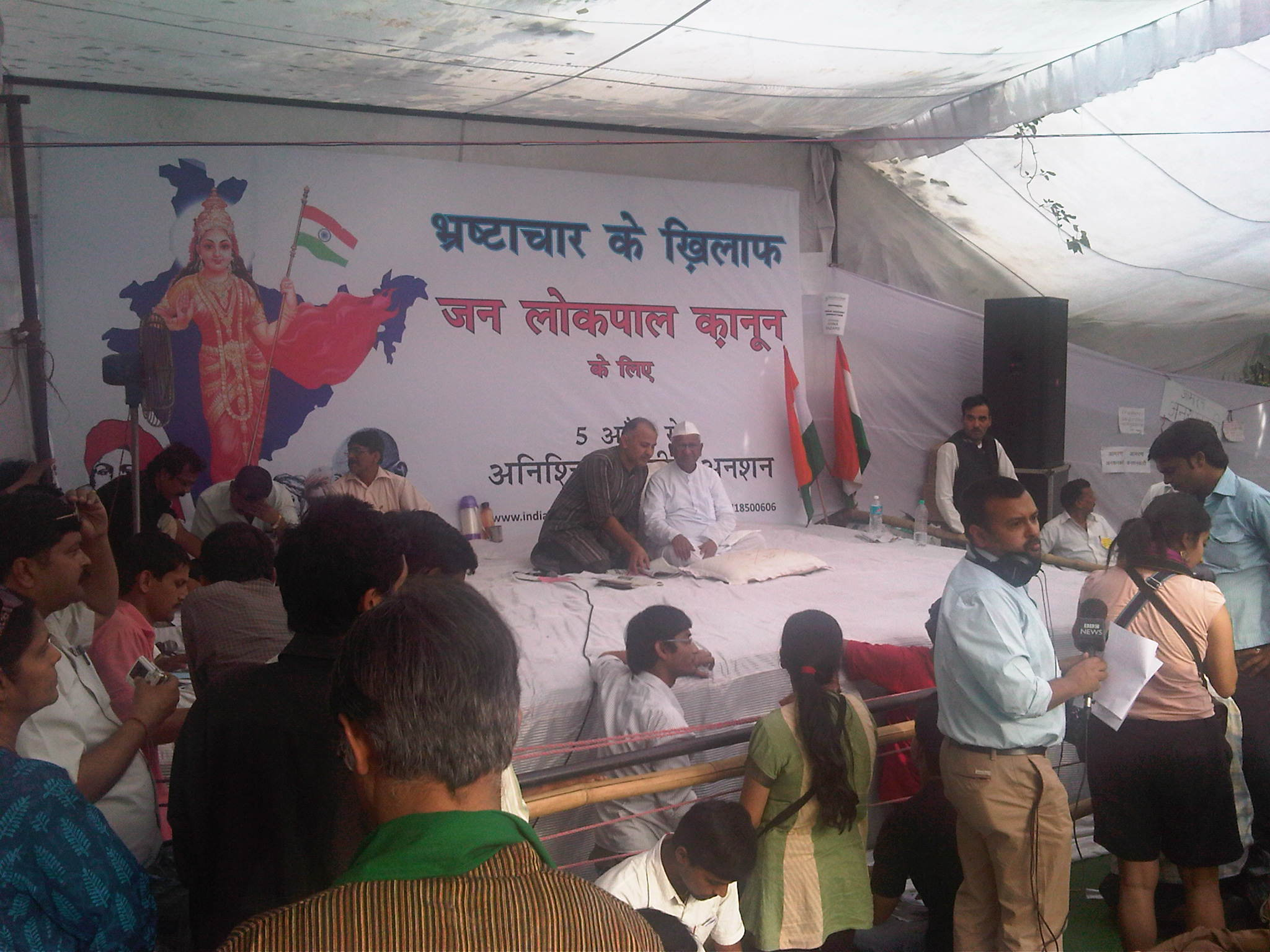
Anna Hazare's hunger strike at Jantar Mantar in New Delhi, on the second day of his fast

Jan Lokpal Bill (Citizen's Ombudsman Bill) is a draft anti-corruption bill drawn up by prominent civil society activists, seeking the appointment of a Jan Lokpal, an independent body that would investigate corruption cases, complete the investigation within one year and conduct trials for the case within the next year.

Drafted by Justice Santosh Hegde (a former Supreme Court Judge and former Lokayukta of Karnataka), Prashant Bhushan (a Supreme Court Lawyer) and Arvind Kejriwal (a RTI activist), the draft Bill envisaged a system in which a corrupt person found guilty would go to jail within two years of the complaint being made and his ill-gotten wealth confiscated. It also sought power for the Jan Lokpal to prosecute politicians and bureaucrats without requiring government permission.

== The Lokpal and Lokayuktas Act, 2013 ==
The historic Lokpal and Lokayuktas Act, 2013 was passed by Indian Parliament paving the way for establishment of a Lokpal (Ombudsman) to fight corruption in public offices and ensure accountability on the part of public officials, including the Prime Minister, but with some safeguards.

Lokpal will consist of a chairperson and a maximum of eight members, of which 50% will be judicial members 50% members of Lokpal shall be from SC/ST/OBCs, minorities and women. Selection of chairperson and members of Lokpal through a selection committee consisting of PM, Speaker of Lok Sabha, leader of opposition in Lok Sabha, Chief Justice of India or a sitting Supreme Court judge nominated by CJI. Eminent jurist to be nominated by President of India on basis of recommendations of the first four members of the selection committee "through consensus". Lokpal's jurisdiction will cover all categories of public servants. All entities (NGOs) receiving donations from foreign source in the context of the Foreign Contribution Regulation Act (FCRA) in excess of Rs 10 lakh per year are under the jurisdiction of Lokpal. Centre will send Lokpal bill to states as a model bill. States have to set up Lokayuktas through a state law within 365 days.

- Lokpal will have power of superintendence and direction over any central investigation agency including CBI for cases referred to them by the ombudsman.
- A high-powered committee chaired by the PM will recommend selection of CBI director. The collegium will comprise PM, leader of opposition in Lok Sabha and Chief Justice of India PM has been brought under purview of the Lokpal, so also central ministers and senior officials.
- Directorate of prosecution will be under overall control of CBI director. At present, it comes under the law ministry.
- Appointment of director of prosecution to be based on recommendation of the Central Vigilance Commission.
- Director of prosecution will also have a fixed tenure of two years like CBI chief.
- Transfer of CBI officers investigating cases referred by Lokpal with the approval of watchdog.
- Bill incorporates provisions for attachment and confiscation of property acquired by corrupt means, even while prosecution is pending.
- Bill lays down clear timelines for preliminary enquiry and investigation and trial. Provides for special courts Public servants will not present their view before preliminary enquiry if the case requires 'element of surprise' like raids and searches.
- Bill grants powers to Lokpal to sanction prosecution against public servants.
- CBI may appoint a panel of advocates with approval of Lokpal, CBI will not have to depend on govt advocates.

On 15 May 2018, Mukul Rohtagi (Former Attorney General of India) has been appointed as an eminent jurist in the selection panel of Lokpal.

== List of chairpersons of the Lokpal committee ==
S. No.	Name	Portrait	Term start	Term end	Tenure	Appointed by (President)	Ref.
1	Pinaki Chandra Ghose		23 March 2019	27 May 2022	3 years, 65 days	Ram Nath Kovind	
2	Pradip Kumar Mohanty (additional charge)		28 May 2022	9 March 2024	4 years, 178 days	Ram Nath Kovind	
3	Ajay Manikrao Khanwilkar		10 March 2024	Incumbent	2 years, 256 days	Droupadi Murmu	

== Controversies ==
In October 2025, public criticism arose following the floating of a tender by Lokpal to procure seven BMW 3 Series luxury cars for all members.

== See also ==
- The Lokpal and Lokayuktas Act, 2013
- Lokayukta
- Citizen's Charter and Grievance Redressal Bill, 2011
- Jan Lokpal Bill
- 2011 Indian anti-corruption movement
