= Karnataka Lokayukta =

Parliamentary Ombudsman for the state of Karnataka

Karnataka Lokayukta Karnāṭaka Lōkāyukta

Agency overview
- Formed: 1984
- Employees: 1403

Jurisdictional structure
- Federal agency (Operations jurisdiction): India
- Operations jurisdiction: India
- Legal jurisdiction: Karnataka
- Constituting instrument: Constitution of India
- General nature: Federal law enforcement

Operational structure
- Headquarters: Multi Storied Building, Dr. B. R. Ambedkar Veedhi, Bengaluru, Karnataka, India, 560001
- Agency executives: B. S. Patil, Lokayukta of Karnataka; K. N. Phaneendra Justice Sri B Veerappa, Upalokayukta of Karnataka

Website
- lokayukta.karnataka.gov.in

Karnataka Lokayukta is the ombudsman institution of the Indian state of Karnataka. It was established in 1984 to investigate and report on corruption in the Government of Karnataka and to redress public grievances related to state government employees. This Lokayukta was once considered the most powerful such institution in the state. However, it was stripped of its investigative powers before transferring them to the Anti-Corruption Bureau (ACB) of Karnataka Police directly under the Chief Minister of Karnataka in 2016. The High Court of Karnataka dissolved ACB and restored all the ongoing cases to the Karnataka Lokayukta in 2022.

== Background ==
In 1966, a report by the Administrative Reforms Commission recommended the setting up of Lokpal at the federal level and Lokayukta in the states, for the redressal of citizen's grievances. Therefore, Maharashtra established its Lokayukta in 1971. The Lokayukta Ordinance Act 1979, was exercised by D. Devaraj Urs, then Chief Minister of Karnataka, and the first Lokayukta to be appointed was then retired Chief Justice of Rajasthan High court, Justice C. Honniah. The same institution was abolished when R. Gundu Rao became the chief minister of Karnataka, after the demise of D. Devaraj Urs. The institution was again re introduced after Ramakrishna Hegde, became then Chief Minister of Karnataka, and introduced the Lokayukta and Upa Lokayukta Bill in the assembly as their 1983 election promise. It came into force through the Karnataka Lokayukta Act, 1984. Then, Mysore State Vigilance Commission which formed in 1965 to investigate corruption cases in the state was abolished. The pending cases before the commission was transferred to the newly formed Lokayukta. It had two jurisdictions: to investigate corruption and to probe government inaction.

== Lokayukta ==
=== Appointment and powers ===
As per the Karnataka Lokayukta Act, 1984, a person appointed the Lokayukta (the institution and its head bearing the same names), who either held the office of a Judge of the Supreme Court of India or that of the Chief Justice of a High Court of India. The Act was amended in 2015, according to which any person who has held the post of judge of the High court for a period of ten years can be appointed as Lokayukta and five years in case of Upa Lokayukta. The Lokayukta is appointed by the Governor of Karnataka on advice of Chief Minister of Karnataka in consultation with the Chief Justice of the High Court of Karnataka, the Chairman of Karnataka Legislative Council, the Speaker of Karnataka Legislative Assembly, the Leader of the Opposition in the Karnataka Legislative Council and the Leader of the Opposition in the Karnataka Legislative Assembly. The Lokayukta has the power to investigate cases in relation to the Chief Minister, all other Ministers and Members of the State Legislature and all state government employees.

The Lokayukta, through Bureau of Investigation, its police wing, had derived its investigating powers from the Prevention of Corruption Act, 1988. Upon the formation of the Anti-Corruption Bureau (ACB) in 2016, these powers were taken away. The powers now remain to giving directions to the ACB to investigate a case that the former finds sufficient evidence for, under section 15(3) of the Lokayukta Act, 1984. It is mandatory to for the ACB to follow these directions, and Lokayukta holds powers to sue the former if it does not. Criticism was directed at the government of Karnataka after it took away the investigative powers from the Lokayukta and having given it to the ACB which functions directly under its supervision. Also, the Lokayukta remains an independent body while the ACB reports to the Chief Secretary of the State.

=== Lokayuktas ===
The term of office of the Lokayukta is five years. The Lokayuktas are listed below:

Name	Term
A. D. Koshal	15 January 1986 – 14 January 1991
Rabindranath Pyne	25 January 1991 – 24 January 1996
Abdul Hakim	2 June 1996 – 1 June 2001
N. Venkatachala	2 July 2001 – 2 July 2006
Santosh Hegde	3 August 2006 – 2 August 2011
Shivaraj Patil	3 August 2011 – 19 September 2011
Y. Bhaskar Rao	14 February 2013 – 8 December 2015
P. Vishwanatha Shetty	28 January 2017 – January 2022
B. S. Patil	15 June 2022 – Present

A. D. Koshal, a retired Judge of the Supreme Court was appointed the first Lokayukta and took charge in January 1986. N. Venkatachala was appointed as the Lokayukta in June 2001, taking office a month later. It was during his tenure that the institution gained popularity in that he was "known for bringing the Lokayukta to the people's doorstep". He would reportedly walk from door to door coaxing people to file complaints. He was called a "one-man army against the corrupt bureaucracy" by former Chief Justice of India M. N. Venkatachaliah.

Santosh Hegde took charge in August 2006 before resigning from the position in June 2010 owing to political interference from the ruling Bharatiya Janata Party (BJP) government. However, he withdrew the resignation a few days later upon being asked to reconsider by senior BJP leader L. K. Advani. Upon completion of his term in August 2011, Shivaraj Patil took over. He resigned the next month after a controversy broke out over allotment of housing sites in 1994 for his wife and him allegedly in violation of the Bangalore city by-laws, maintaining his innocence. Y. Bhaskar Rao, who took charge after more than two years, also resigned from the position after charges of running an extortion ring in the Lokayukta institution were directed against his son and him. After the post remained vacant for more than a year, P. Vishwanatha Shetty was appointed in January 2017.

== Investigation ==
In 2011, Santosh Hegde submitted a report on illegal mining in the state which reported loss of Rs 160.85 billion to the state. This report exposed the biggest mining scam in India. This report led to the resignation of B. S. Yeddyurappa, then Chief Minister of Karnataka, from the post.

== See also ==
- Goa Lokayukta
- Lokayukta
- Maharashtra Lokayukta
- Tamilnadu Lokayukta
- Uttar Pradesh Lokayukta
