= Delhi Lokayukta =

Anti-corruption Ombudsman for the state of Delhi

Agency overview
- Formed: 1997

Jurisdictional structure
- Federal agency: India
- Operations jurisdiction: India
- General nature: Federal law enforcement

Operational structure
- Headquarters: Office of the Lokayukta, Government Of NCT Of Delhi, 'G' Block, Vikas Bhawan, I.P. Estates, New Delhi-110002, 2337-0865, 2337-0561, 2337-0073, Fax: 2337-8155 Telefax:2337-0570,
- Agency executive: Vacant

Delhi Lokayukta is a high level statutory functionary formed by the Government of Delhi under the Delhi Lokayukta and Upa-Lokayuktas Act, 1995. The position acts as the parliamentary ombudsman for the Union Territory of Delhi. The act is aimed to increase efficiency in the standard of services in public offices through immediate investigation of grievances against ministers, legislators and other public servants and officials serving in Government offices, by any member of public through their timely investigation . The Lokpal and Lokayuktas Act, 2013 in Parliament had become law with effect from 16 January 2014 and requires each state to appoint its Lokayukta within a year. A bench of Lokayukta should consist of judicial and non-judicial members.

A Lokayukta is appointed by the Governor of a state after consulting a committee consisting of the Chief Minister of State, Speaker of its Legislative Assembly, Leader of Opposition in the legislature, Chairman of Legislative Council and Leader of Opposition in Legislative Council. Appointment is for a five-year term and once appointed, a Lokayukta cannot be removed from office except in cases of misbehaviour or any other reasons specified in the Act.

== History and administration ==
The Delhi Lokayukta and Uplokayukta Act, 1995 became operational from 22 September 1997. As per the Act, Chief Justice of the Delhi High Court and the Leader of Opposition in the Legislative Assembly are consulted by Lieutenant Governor of Delhi while selecting and appointing a person as Lokayukta for the Union Territory of Delhi. As per the Act, once the office of Lokayukta becomes vacant due to retirement, superannuation or for any other reason of a serving official, a new Lokayukta should be appointed within a period of 6 months. Many state Legislature have adopted the Act so that in addition to only serving chief Justices or sitting judges even retired Chief Justices or retired Justices can be considered as eligible for appointment for the position as the State Lokayukta.

== Oath or affirmation ==
"I, <name>, having been appointed Lokayukta (or Upa-Lokayukta) do swear in the name of God (or solemnly affirm) that I will bear faith and allegiance to the Constitution of India as by law established and I will duly and faithfully and to the best of my ability, knowledge and judgment perform the duties of my office without fear or favour, affection or ill-will."

— First Schedule, The Delhi Lokayukta and Upa-Lokayuktas Act, 1995

== Powers ==
Lokayukta has independent powers to investigate and prosecute any government official or public servants who are covered by the act and against whom complaint is received for abusing his authority for self-interest or causes hurt to anyone or any action done intentionally or following corrupt practices negatively impacting the state or individual. Once complaint is received on allegations of corruption, wrong use of authority and misdeeds by any of the public functionaries who may include Chief Minister, Ministers under him and members of the Legislature Assembly, Lokayukta has the power to recommend enquiry to necessary authorities and prosecute if proven. However, members like civil servants, Central Government officers, members of the legal community, police and officials of the Delhi Development Authority are excluded from this Act.

== Appointment and tenure ==
In year 2015, Reva Khetrapal was appointed a new Lokayukta for a term of five years. She was appointed two years after the previous lokayukta, Justice Manmohan Sarin, retired after serving a period of five years. Following is the list of past Lokayuktas of Delhi:

Index	Name	Holding charge from	Holding charge to
1	Justice Shri R.N.Aggarwal	01.12.1997	01.12.2002
2	Justice Shri Mohd. Shamim	12.03.2003	12.03.2008
3	Justice Sh. Manmohan Sarin	06.11.2008	06.11.2013
4	Justice Ms Reva Khetrapal	17.12.2015	

== Notable cases ==
Following are some of the important orders passed by the Institution:

1. In one of the cases on complaints relating to release of stipends for old age people under a scheme during the year 2018, which had allegedly resulted in a notable loss to the state Government, the institution had ordered for registering an FIR against a North Delhi Municipal Corporation (NDMC) councillor.

2. In year 2019 on a complaint received by it, the Lokayukta had asked the state Assembly to issue notices to all MLA's to make annual declaration of their assets and liabilities.

3. In one of its earlier orders, the institution gave a clean chit to ex Delhi Chief Minister Ms.Sheila Dikshit on a complaint relating to a case for granting of government grants to a private firm in noncompliance of regulations and resulting in undue favours.

== Related articles ==
- The Lokpal and Lokayuktas Act, 2013
- Goa Lokayukta
- Maharashtra Lokayukta
- Gujarat Lokayukta
- Madhya Pradesh Lokayukta
