= Anjali Bhardwaj =

Indian social activist

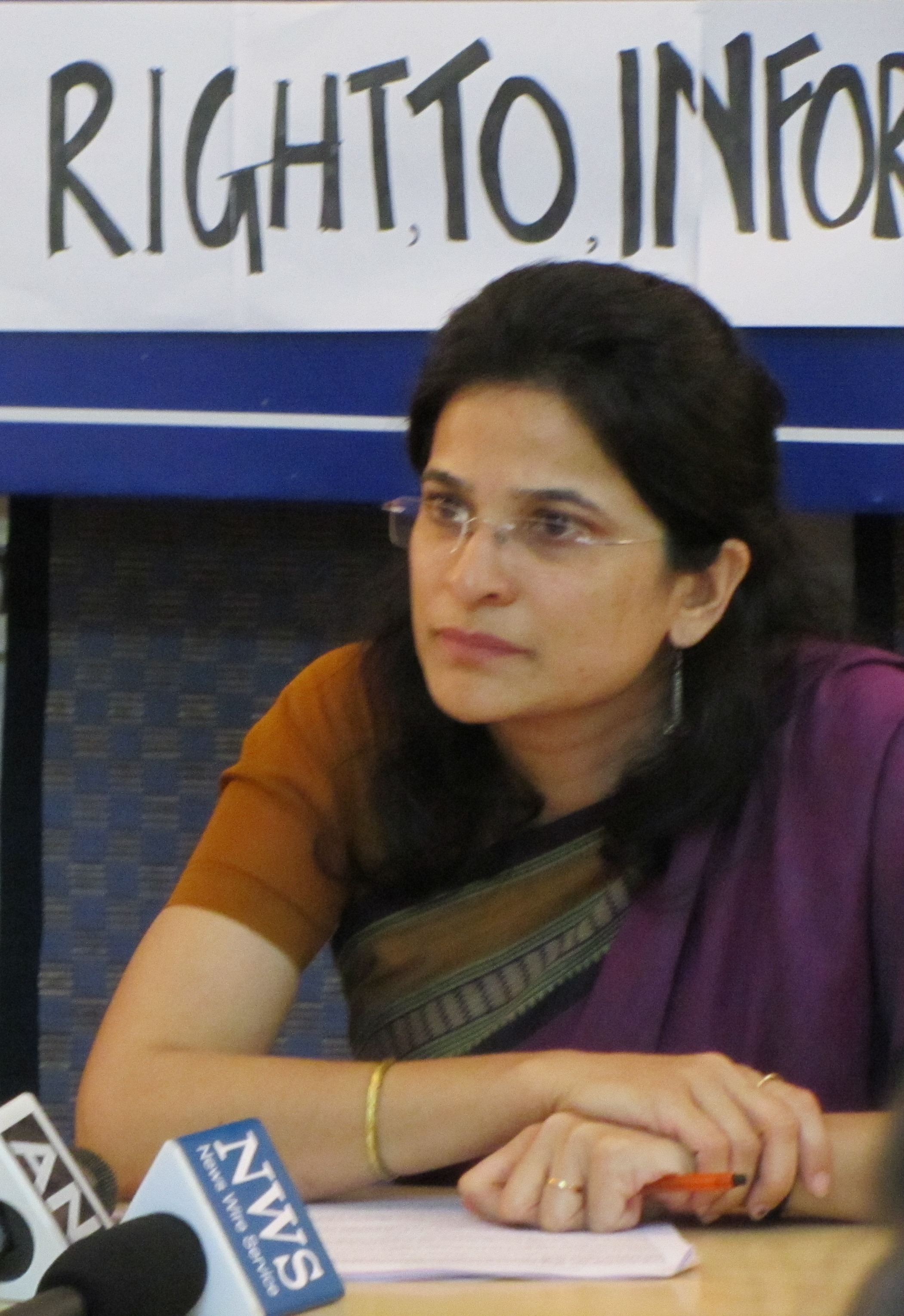
Anjali Bhardwaj at a press conference of the National Campaign for Peoples' Right to Information (NCPRI)

Anjali Bhardwaj (born 1973) is an Indian social activist working on issues of transparency and accountability. She is a co-convenor of the National Campaign for People's Right to Information (NCPRI) and a founding member of Satark Nagrik Sangathan. She works on issues related to right to information, Lokpal, whistleblower protection, grievance redress, and right to food.

== Early life ==
Bhardwaj did her BA from Lady Shri Ram College, Delhi University, and holds an MSc degree from the University of Oxford and a master's degree from the Delhi School of Economics, Delhi University.

== Work ==
Bhardwaj has been involved with the right to information movement in India since 1999. Anjali has been very vocal on the question of accountability and transparency., She is a co-convenor of the National Campaign for People's Right to Information (NCPRI). Her efforts there include working toward the Right to Information Act, 2005, the Whistle Blowers Protection Act, 2011, The Lokpal and Lokayuktas Act, 2013, and the Grievance Redress Bill.

Anjali is a founding member of Satark Nagrik Sangathan (SNS). Set up in 2003, SNS uses the Right to Information Act to help improve the accountability of the Indian government. Report Cards developed by SNS on the performance of legislators are widely publicized through the media.

She works with RTI Assessment & Advocacy Group (RAAG), which was set up in 2008 to undertake ongoing assessments of the implementation of the RTI Act.

== Awards and honors ==
Anjali has been honored with the "International Anticorruption Champions Award" by the US Department of State, where she was among the 12 global Anticorruption champions. Anjali was awarded the Ashoka Fellowship for Social Entrepreneurs in 2009 for using the RTI Act to ensure transparency, accountability and responsiveness in the functioning of elected representatives. She was presented the Honour Roll of Lady Shri Ram College in 2011 for promoting transparency and accountability in governance.

== Media ==
She writes extensively on issues of transparency and accountability in the media:

- Peoples' Monitoring of the RTI Regime in India 2012–13
- Article on Lokpal amendments – Indian Express
- Article on Whistle Blowers Protection Act – Indian Express
- Article on Prevention of Corruption Act – The Hindu
- Article on Lokpal Act – EPW
- Article on Lokpal Bill – Economic Times
- Article on proposed amendments to the RTI Act – Outlook magazine
- Article on performance of Information Commissions – The Deccan Herald
- Article on the RTI Act – Outlook Magazine
