= Debendranath =

Debendranath is a masculine given name. Notable people with the name include:

- Debendranath Bandyopadhyay (born 1931), Indian politician
- Debendranath Champia (born 1942), Indian politician
- Debendranath Tagore (1817–1905), Indian philosopher and religious reformer
