= Nauroti Devi =

Nauroti Devi is an Indian Dalit woman social activist and politician from Rajasthan, India. She was elected Sarpanch of her village Harmada in 2010.

== Early life ==
Devi was born in the Indian village of Harmada, in Kishangarh tehsil, Ajmer district, Rajasthan. Her family were underprivileged Dalits. She was not able to attend school or receive any formal education, and worked as a stone cutter at a road construction site as a young woman.

== Early activism ==
While working as a stone cutter Devi worked with her coworkers to protest the wage discrepancy between male and female workers on the construction site and for fair wages overall. With the help of a NGO, Nauroti led a campaign and took the case to the Indian Supreme Court.

== Education ==
After winning the Supreme Court case, Devi was inspired to further educate herself at the Barefoot College started by Bunker Roy where she took a literacy training program and learned the basics of using a computer. She continues to train women and children from her community in computers.

== Political office ==
Devi was elected the sarpanch of Harmada in 2010. During her five-year term she worked on regional development and bringing civic facilities like toilets and houses to the community. As sarpanch, Devi fought against the alcohol mafia in Harmada and also reacquired land allocated for a government health centre and also fenced it so that a health centre could be built there. At the end of her term she had left a surplus of rupees thirteen lakh in the panchayat account. She has been an active member of the Mazdoor Kisan Shakti Sanghatan since 1982 and also participated in the Right to Information campaign in Rajasthan, which laid the foundation for the Right to Information (RTI) Act passed by the Indian government in 2005.
