= Nikhil Dey =

Indian Social Activist

- Born: 1963 (age 62–63)
- Citizenship: Indian
- Occupation: Activist
- Movement: Mazdoor Kisan Shakti Sangathan

Nikhil Dey (born 1963) is an Indian social activist. He works for the Mazdoor Kisan Shakti Sangathan, Suchna Evum Rozgar Adhikar Abhiyan and NCPRI (National Campaign for People's Right to Information). He has worked for Right to Information, Mahatma Gandhi National Rural Employment Guarantee Act, Lokpal bill and Right to Food and other Human Rights organisations.

== Early activities ==
After working briefly with the Kheduth Mazdoor Chetna Sangathana in Madhya Pradesh, he joined Aruna Roy and Shankar Singh in 1987 to go to Devdungri, in Rajsamand District in Rajasthan where along with many others they helped form and establish the Mazdoor Kisan Shakti Sangathan (MKSS).

== Social activist ==
Since 1990, he has been a full-time worker for the MKSS, and a part of the organisation's decision making collective. In this capacity he has been involved in struggles of the poor for justice, including grass root struggles for land and the payment of minimum wages. He has also been a part of the organisation's involvement in larger campaigns: the People's Right to Information, and the Right to Work, the Right to Food, and the protection of other human rights guaranteed under the Indian Constitution.

He was called in the television programme Satyamev Jayate to clarify the Right to Information along with Shankar Sing, Sowmya Kidambi and Aruna Roy.

Nikhil Dey also worked with the Government of Rajasthan on its Jana Soochana programme, which aimed to implement the 'proactive disclosure' section of the Right to Information Act, by which the government would publish information about its work proactively and obviate any need to file RTI requests.
