= Champia (surname) =

Champia is a surname. Notable people with the surname include:

- Debendranath Champia (born 1942), Indian politician
- Mangal Singh Champia (born 1983), Indian archer
