= Aruna Roy =

Indian activist

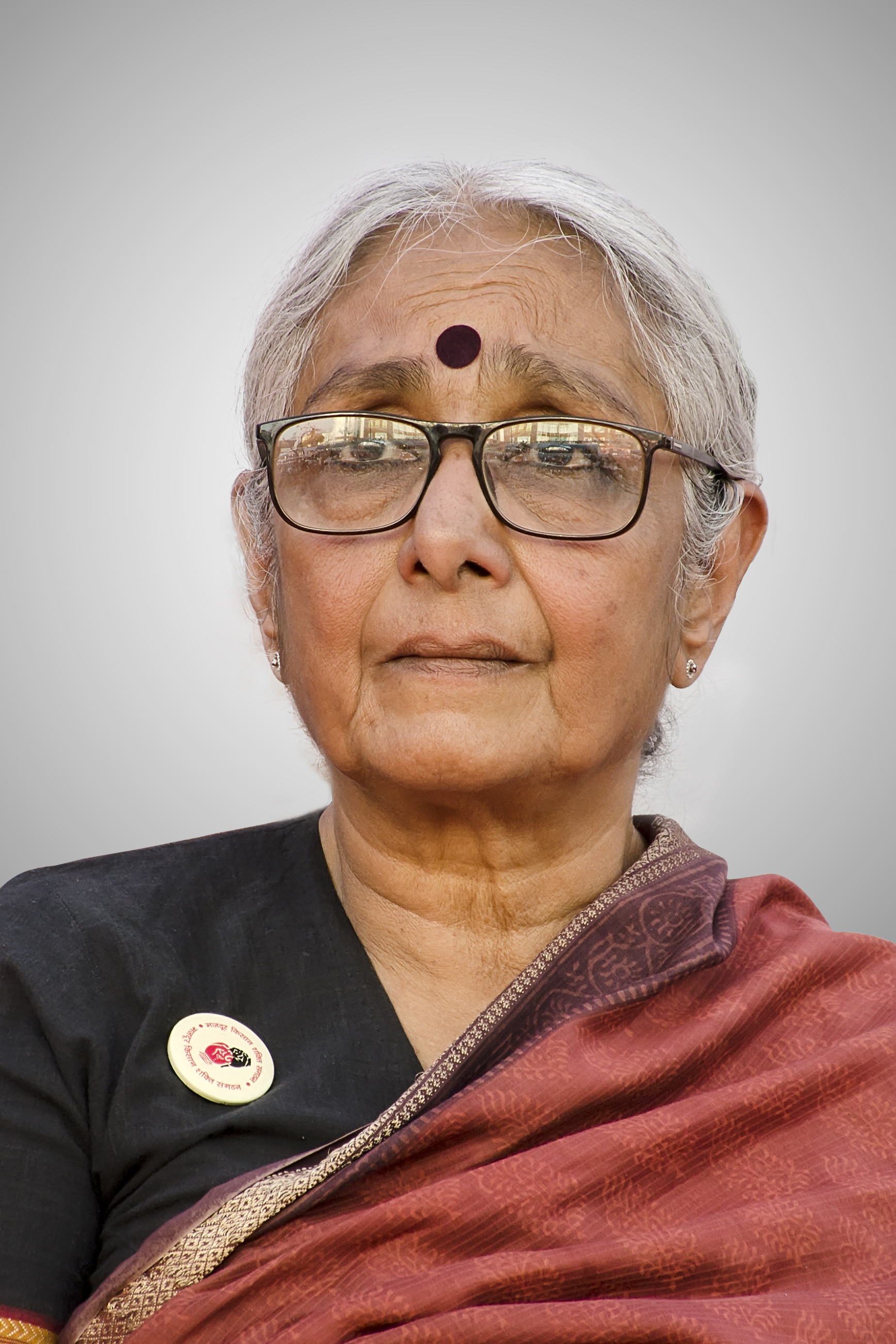

President of the National Federation of Indian Women
- In office 2008–2024
- Preceded by: Dr. K. Saradamoni
- Succeeded by: Syeda Saiyidain Hameed

Personal details
- Born: 26 May 1946 (age 80) Madras, British Raj
- Spouse: Sanjit Roy (m. 1970)
- Education: Indraprastha College (B.A.); Delhi University (M.A.); National Academy of Administration (M.P.Adm.)
- Occupation: Activist, professor, union organiser and civil servant
- Awards: Ramon Magsaysay Award, 2000; Lal Bahadur Shastri National Award, 2010

Aruna Roy (née Jayaram, born 26 May 1946) is an Indian social activist, professor, union organiser and retired IAS officer. She was the president of the National Federation of Indian Women and founder of the Mazdoor Kisan Shakti Sangathan.

== Early life and education ==
Aruna was born on 6 June 1946, in Chennai, Tamil Nadu, India (Chennai was known as Madras at the time and was a part of the Madras Presidency in British India), to parents Hema and E. D. Jayaram, a family of Tamil Brahmins. (Note: India became independent in 1947, a year after Aruna's birth.) The family in which Aruna grew up was unconventional for their times and had a history of public service encompassing several generations. They rejected orthodox beliefs about caste and religion, and were known for a commitment to egalitarian principles.

All her grandparents were highly educated and included an engineer, a magistrate and a lawyer. The women in her family in particular served as role models for her. Her maternal grandmother was an educated woman and was deeply involved in volunteer social work among impoverished communities. She was born to an orthodox Tamil Brahmin family and had insisted on working with leprosy patients. Her maternal grandfather was an engineer, who was also involved in social work and wrote textbooks which he printed and distributed at his own cost to make them affordable for poorer children. Aruna's mother, Hema was sent to first class schools, where she had excelled in physics, mathematics, classical Sanskrit and sports. She was also well versed in the literature of several languages and participated in musical performances with the veena. The marriage between Hema and Jayaram defied norms as Hema had waited till she was 25 to get married and Jayaram belonged to a different sub-caste. Jayaram's family too had a history of social and political activism. He was sent to Shantiniketan and later became a lawyer by profession. (Note: Shantiniketan was a school founded by the nobel laureate and polymath Rabindranath Tagore.) He participated in the Indian independence movement, became a civil servant after independence and eventually retired as the Legal Adviser for the Council of Scientific and Industrial Research. Jayaram also worked as a film and music critic and published reviews in various newspapers.

Aruna was the eldest of four siblings and had two sisters and a brother. The children were brought up to be multilingual and the family spoke three languages at home, namely Tamil, English and Hindi. She and her siblings were encouraged to be critical thinkers, discouraged from harboring any form of prejudice around ethnicity, caste or class and taught to respect people regardless of their social standing. Aruna was enrolled for two years at the Kalakshetra academy in Adyar, Chennai to train in Bharatanatyam and Carnatic music. She was also educated at a convent school and learned French on the insistence of her parents. She was then sent to the Aurobindo Ashram in Pondicherry while her family moved to New Delhi. After a year at the ashram (hermitage), she expressed unhappiness with her situation so her family brought her to New Delhi where she completed the rest of her education. She attended the Bharatiya Vidya Bhavan till the age of 16, (Note: Bharatiya Vidya Bhavan was a series of schools founded by K. M. Munshi for Indianising education) when she applied for and successfully enrolled at the Indraprastha College for Women. Her admission was unexpected for the college faculty as she qualified at an age earlier than usual. Aruna majored in English Literature and then immediately went for a master's degree in 1965. She completed her post-graduation at the University of Delhi.

Following her education, she did not want to become a homemaker like most women during that time, which she considered to be a "limbo of passivity" but most fields were male dominated and her options were limited to journalism and teaching. For a short period of time, she became a professor of English Literature at her alma mater. In 1967, at the age of 21, she gave the difficult examinations for the Indian Administrative Service, which at the time had a selection rate of less than 0.1% and a marginal number of successful women candidates. Aruna was able to get selected on her first attempt at the examinations and was one of only 10 women to qualify in that year. She was influenced by feminism and considered joining the male dominated civil services in her father's footsteps to be a feminist choice. Mahatma Gandhi also had a significant influence on her family and their ethics, and she incorporated his philosophy in her way of thinking along with the philosophy of M. N. Roy. (Note: M.N. Roy was a revolutionary during the British Raj, an exponent of the philosophy of "radical humanism" and the founder of the communist parties of India and Mexico.) She was sent to the National Academy of Administration for a year's course followed by a year of supervised training called probation. Her batch had 100 successful candidates and the course included an intensive study of economics, law, languages and basic administration. It also included horse riding and guidelines on courtesies and etiquette from the British period. She along with other students in her batch had rebelled against various aspects of the curriculum and were able to introduce some reforms which were implemented for the batch after theirs.

== Career and activism ==
=== Civil services (1968–1974) ===
Aruna was a part of the Union Territories cadre but was sent to Tamil Nadu for her probationary period as she knew the Tamil language. Her first assignment was that of an assistant to the supervising administrator (known as District Collector) of Tiruchi district. She opted for and was granted a transfer to Vellore district (at the time known as North Arcot) after her supervisor in Tiruchi refused to mentor her. T. V. Venkataram was the Collector in Vellore and he made a lasting impact on Aruna and others assigned as assistants to him. They were provided with independent charges under supervision which was unconventional in the system. Aruna married a batch mate of hers from University of Delhi, Sanjit Roy in 1970. He belonged to a Bengali family and had involved himself in social work since his time in college. She changed her name to Aruna Roy (née Jayaram) after marriage. By the time of her marriage, Roy was a Sub-Collector in the Union Territory of Pondicherry and after marriage, she was granted a transfer to the Union Territory of Delhi as she had married a person who lived in that region.

Roy's first assignment in Delhi was that of a Sub-Divisional Magistrate. She oversaw six police jurisdictions and besides her regular duties, had to manage student protests and election duty. Over the following period, she became the Deputy Secretary for finance and in 1973, was promoted to the position of Secretary to the Lieutenant Governor of Delhi. She was disillusioned with the civil services by this time. Aruna had joined the services as she saw it as a means of working for social justice within a constitutional framework, with the conviction that the provisions of the Indian Constitution, if implemented, was the correct standards for providing decent and equitable treatment to citizens. She was aware before joining that there was corruption in the system but thought that it was possible to enact reform from within. In contrast, after around 7 years within the system, she came to see the organisation as a hidebound institution where feudal and colonial values were nurtured. According to her, while it was possible for honest officials to not engage in collusion, the only recourse they had at most times was silence and inaction.

She states that corruption didn't exist just in the form of graft but also in decision making and identified three primary problems with the organisation; one that of inability of to engage in ethical disagreement over a policy or decision that would "lead to people's lives being damaged", another being the negative consequences of addressing malpractice by politicians or even others in the bureaucracy and the third being the requirement to carry out orders regardless of any negative impact it might have. She describes the institution to have developed an elitist approach, with those granted promotions for liaisons with powerful politicians and being of little help to those most in need such as the poor. Concluding that the institution was not moving in the right direction and that it wasn't possible to bring change from within, as hierarchy suppressed all protestations and contradictions, she decided to eventually leave the civil services. Through the IAS, Aruna was however able to gain an understanding of the workings of the State and develop connections among a network of educated and influential people whom she considered to be honest officers.

=== Barefoot College (1974–1983) ===
Roy had consulted with her family and friends before resigning from the IAS but most of them discouraged her from doing so. In 1974, she took a six-month leave to join her husband at the Social Work Research Centre (commonly known as the Barefoot College) and witnessing a relation of equality between her husband and the people there, compared to the deferential treatment she had received as a bureaucrat. Later in the same year, she submitted her resignation from the civil service after waiting for her brother to finish college as she was a major contributor to the income of her parents' household. Aged 28, she moved to the village of Tilonia where her husband was working. Tilonia was a small village located in Rajasthan, 100 km away from the capital of Jaipur, where her husband had established the Barefoot College in 1972 for social and economic development of the village. He had recruited many individuals from top tier educational institutions and it would later come to be known as one of India's most professional development organisations.

In Tilonia, there was a significant shift in lifestyle and outlook for Roy. There were no pipelines for water services and finding drinking water was a hazard. The village did not have electricity or access to any public transportation or banking services, she had to walk for miles to reach the location. Roy's upbringing like, much of India's urban upper middle class, had taken place entirely in urban areas and in near complete ignorance of rural life. She had come into contact with villagers during her time in the civil services but due to her position as an administrative officer, there were barriers in communication and her understanding of socioeconomic realities in the villages. She with her husband moved into an accommodation which hosted seventeen other employees of the Barefoot College, including three graduates of the Tata Institute of Social Sciences and three geologists from the Indian Institute of Technology. The employees shared household and organisational duties among themselves which included everything from cooking to setting up facilities for children's education and income-generating programs for villagers. Over the course of the years, Barefoot College would various technologies including solar power in a number of villages and educate rural residents on the concept and operation of these sophisticated systems.

Initially, Roy experienced resistance in finding acceptance in the village. Her attempts at bringing new ideas about childbearing and schooling were dismissed by the women there. Though the attitude was welcomed by her as she was no longer being treated as an authority but rather as an equal. According to her, it is essential for deprived people to be the agents of their own change and that her job was to serve as a catalyst rather than a leader. In addition, there was hostility from the more prosperous section of villagers, due to her affinity towards the weavers and leather workers, who belonged to dalit castes. Eventually, an old woman named Dhani Bhua helped her in getting adjusted with village life. Once her presence as was accepted, she came to frequently socialise with the women there and became sought after for advice on issues such as the use of birth control. Roy herself developed a personal preference for an ascetic lifestyle reinforced by a belief in the Gandhian ideal that one must change oneself to bring change. During her time in Tilonia, she experienced a change in perspective. Roy started regarding facets such as illiteracy and lack of education as a skill disadvantage rather than that of ability or intelligence, and recognised that they had a deep knowledge in their field of occupation that others did not possess including those which are considered unskilled labour. Roy describes Tilonia to have been her real alma mater and the villagers to be better teachers than those in Delhi and at the IAS. According to her, the IAS training was inadequate for understanding the complexities of socioeconomic change that were occurring in the rural areas, and that the villages represented neither the romantic notions of a rural life nor the simplistic view of a sexist caste-ridden conservative society, both common stereotypes among the urban well-to-do population.

The Barefoot College operated as an apolitical service aimed at economic self sufficiency and acted as an alternative for the unavailable government services. The organisation was funded by a number of international and national agencies such as the Sir Ratan Tata Trust and Oxfam, as well as the governments of Rajasthan and India. It developed a parallel bureaucracy constrained by profit margins and grant specifications. Their reach was limited and Roy eventually started questioning whether they were being effective in enacting any significant change and promoting grassroots empowerment. Though the organisation would sometimes encourage legal action, it was averse of any mass mobilisation confronting the government. In 1981, a revenue collector requested Roy to help end a labor strike in the neighbouring village of Harmara. Led by a dalit women named Naurti Bai, the strike had gathered 500 minimum wage workers who refused to return to work or accept any payment until their full wages including pending dues were paid. She convinced the strikers to end their protest and in the process befriended Naurti, from whom she came to learn about the effectiveness of using information in mobilising people. The Barefoot College initiated the Sanjit Roy vs. the Government of Rajasthan case over the non-payment of minimum wages, while Roy attempted to raise the issue of reforming the organisation into one that could support collective action. Several meetings were held over the following period that led to disagreements among the members and no breakthroughs were achieved. In 1983, the Supreme Court ruled in favor of the workers in the minimum wage case, in what was considered a landmark judgement and Roy decided to leave the Barefoot College in the same year, in search of a different platform for grassroots empowerment in rural India.

=== Interceding years (1983–1990) ===
Between 1983 and 1987, Roy moved around working with various tribal and women's group in Rajasthan and neighbouring states, looking to encourage collective action. She remained associated with the Barefoot College and would return to Tilonia to help out with their work from time to time. In 1985, she was invited to attend the international women's conference in Nairobi, Kenya but she did not attend it and instead organised a mahila mela (women's festival) in Rajasthan to act as its counterpart, with the view of starting a forum for rural women as the international women's movement was largely centered on middle class urban women. The mela was organised with the help of the Barefoot College, Seva Mandir and the Institute of Development Studies. It was the first women's rights congregation in India which focused on poor rural women and saw the attendance of thousands from all across the country. The festival featured games, competitions, arts and crafts, workshops and socio-political discussions, and concluded with a prabhat pheri (morning invocation walk), a protest demonstration in the nearby town of Kishangarh against the rape of an 11-year-old child. The mela was the first instance of a public discussion on violence against women in that area and is described to have marked a shift in attitude where the onus for shame was laid on the perpetrators rather than the victims.

In the summer of 1987, Roy accompanied by like-minded associates from the Barefoot College, moved to the village of Devdungri, 180 km away from Tilonia, with the intention of building a new organisation. Devdungri was chosen as their home base, as one of them, Shankar Singh had a relative who owned an unoccupied house in the village and was willing to grant it to them. Roy, another activist Nikhil Dey, Singh and his wife and children were the first to move into the house. It was a two roomed hut made of mud and stone hut and was in disrepair for years. The group expanded the house, building a living room, a kitchen and an additional room using traditional methods that they had learned from labourers back at the Barefoot College. Roy had used her connections to take a grant of ₹30,000 from the Ministry of Human Resource Development for studying the participation rates of the rural poor in the government's poverty alleviation programs. The grant became the starting budget for the organisation and each of them received a government assigned minimum wage of ₹14 a day, which formed the household budget. Devdungri was located in a drought prone and environmentally degraded region, and the living conditions of the occupants were not much better than those of the farmers and labourers that resided in it, which made them adopt a Mahatma Gandhi-inspired minimalist ascetic life.

For Roy, the move to Devdungri was a more significant shift in terms of perspective than the one from the civil services to Tilonia; it involved an effort to create an organisation capable of collective action that would operate on a model of citizens' participation rather than through a bureaucracy. The group intended to first integrate themselves in the village and only then, if possible, establish a platform with the initiative of the villagers. Of all the members, Roy found it the hardest to gain acceptance and trust in Devdungri. In contrast to Singh, whose relatives and background was known in the village and who was soon seen as one of them, she had the image of an outsider and was seen with some suspicion. Though Roy was well versed in the local dialect and the norms of village life from her previous experiences in Tilonia, she had gossip floating around related to her having been a civil servant who had chosen to live in meagre circumstances among them, which the villagers were reluctant to believe. She states that transparency and honesty were crucial for her in gaining their trust. In particular, she had to work hard among the women in an attempt to get them out of the mindset that they had to play a secondary role. She shared in with them in their sorrows and grievances, helped and supported them through personal crises and eventually engaged them in protest action, starting with issues they cared about the most, such as violence against women. Roy however states that it wasn't as difficult as one would expect to mobilise them as they were working and present in public life, and did not have to be brought out of their homes into the public sphere.

In 1988, the three activists, Roy, Dey and Singh mobilised a campaign in the neighbouring village of Sohangarh against a powerful landlord. The landlord had retained 25 hectares of land that was granted to the village for community use in contravention of land ceiling laws. He demanded payment from the villagers which they were no longer willing to accept. Over the course of the next two years, the landlord tried to force the villagers into compliance with intimidation and violence. In the end, the activists acquired a ruling in favor of the village from the Udaipur district magistrate who forced the landlord to vacate. They then helped set up a village committee to determine land use; the committee decided that the land would be turned into a forested conservation area which the villagers could for firewood and cattle grazing, while the activists helped secure a grant from the Wastelands Department for the conversion of the land. The area would go on to be known as a model for forest and water conservation in Rajasthan. The success established the credibility of the trio and acted as a demonstration of the effectiveness of collective action that they had been trying to encourage in the area.

The team soon became sought for another issue; people from the area including Devdungri and several neighbouring villages were pooled to work on a famine relief project but weren't receiving their full wages due to corruption at the local level. The activists initially counseled the workers to carefully track all the work they did and keep a record of them, but even after an engineer confirmed the veracity of the records, the workers still did not receive they legally mandated. Once the first step did not work, the team organised a campaign of non-cooperation, in which the workers refused any payment unless their full wages were paid. The workers could not be sustain it for long as they needed daily wages and only two of them struck it out till the end. Instead they organised a protest around the magistrate's office in Rajsamand district. The protest received media attention and unnerved the local administration, a representative from the state government arrived at the district and assured them that wages would be paid. In the aftermath, the local officials reduced the wages by 20% and the workers took the case to court but only the two who had decided to not accept any payment won the case and were paid their dues. The results were unsatisfactory and the team which had gathered a core group of activists and villagers started contemplating new strategies. Through the spring of 1990, they held deliberations for several months on creating a new political advocacy organisation that could sustain large scale protests and demonstrations.

=== Mazdoor Kisan Shakti Sangathan (1990–2004) ===
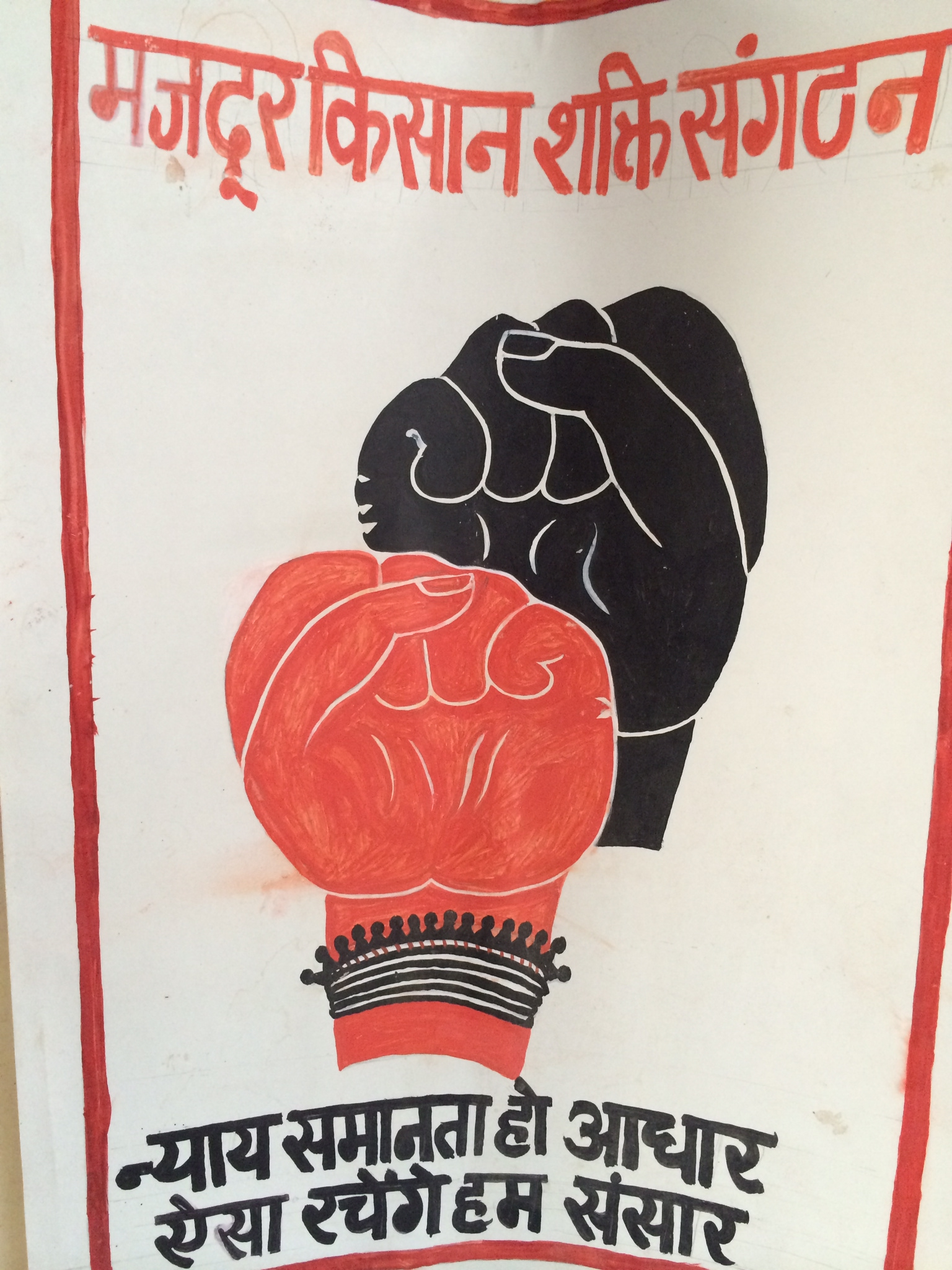
Poster featuring the MKSS symbol; a red and black emblem with one male and one female fist, raised in unison.

On 1 May 1990, the Mazdoor Kisan Shakti Sangathan (transl. Workers' and Peasants' Power Collective; MKSS) was founded in a public gathering of approximately 1,000 people camped in tents outside the town of Bhim in Rajsamand district, Rajasthan. Aruna Roy, Nikhil Dey and Shankar Singh were the three primary activists of the organisation and formed its core leadership. The foundation of the organisation was laid in 1987 when the three activists had first started organising the rural poor in the village of Devdungri. Formed to operate as a non-party political organisation that could mobilise collective action in order to secure the rights of the rural poor, it was structured as a non-bureaucratic and non-hierarchical organisation with no designated leader. It was not registered as a society or a trade union and had no formal constitution. It did not have any membership fees and raised funds solely through contributions from volunteers and supporters, maintaining a policy of not accepting donations from governments, corporations or any institutional funders. Membership relied on participation and developed into four layers.

The first layer was that of a core group of 15–20 full-time workers, followed by a second layer of 40 members who regularly participated in agitations and organisational activities. The two groups formed the primary decision-making body and relied on a consensus based model. They had a support base of around 6,000–8,000 people who formed the third layer with a more irregular rate of participation. In time, the organisation gathered an additional layer of supporters and sympathisers composed of civil society members, academics and even government officials. According to Aruna, the small size of the core group was important to prevent bureaucratisation, preserve its non-hierarchical internal democratic structure and its members' commitment to a set of ethics which she articulates as not engaging in corruption or discrimination and remaining pacifist.

==== Right to Information movement ====
The MKSS began by fighting for fair and equal wages for workers which shaped and evolved into a struggle for the enactment of India's Right to Information Act. Aruna Roy is a leader of the Right to Information movement in India through the MKSS and the National Campaign for People's Right to Information (NCPRI), which was finally successful with the passage of the Right to Information Act in 2005.

=== Later career (2004–present) ===
Aruna Roy has been at the forefront of a number of campaigns for the rights of the poor and the marginalised. These have included, most prominently, the Right to Information, the Right to Work (the NREGA), and the Right to Food. More recently, she has been involved with the campaign for universal, non-contributory pension for unorganised sector workers as a member of the Pension Parishad and the NCPRI for the passage and enactment of the Whistleblower Protection Law and Grievance Redress Act.

She served as a member of the National Advisory Council (NAC) until 2006 when she resigned. She was also appointed the 2016 professor of practice in global governance at McGill University, in Montreal.

In 2018, along with the MKSS collective, Roy published a book chronicling the history of the Right to Information movement in India titled The RTI Story: Power to the People.

== Honours and awards ==
With the Mazdoor Kisan Shakti Sangathan, Aruna Roy was awarded the Times Fellowships Award for 1991 for her work for rural workers rights to social justice and creative development. In 2000, she received the Ramon Magsaysay Award for Community Leadership. In 2010 she received the Lal Bahadur Shastri National Award for Excellence in Public Administration, Academia and Management. In 2011, she was named as one of the hundred most influential people in the world by Time magazine. In September 2017 the Times of India listed Roy as one of the 11 Human Rights Activists Whose Life Mission Is To Provide Others with a Dignified Life.

In December 2024, Aruna Roy was included on the BBC's 100 Women list.

== Selected works ==
=== Academic ===
- Roy, Aruna (1974). "Realistic Motif in the Ideology of Tagore". Indian Literature. 17 (1/2). Sahitya Akademi: 52–58. ISSN 0019-5804. JSTOR 23329847.
- Roy, Aruna (1976). "Tagore's Concept of Love". Indian Literature. 19 (5). Sahitya Akademi: 103–113. ISSN 0019-5804. JSTOR 24157345.
- Roy, Aruna (1980). "Schools and Communities: An Experience in Rural India". International Review of Education. 26 (3). Springer: 369–378. Bibcode:1980IREdu..26..369R. doi:10.1007/BF01427501. ISSN 0020-8566. JSTOR 3443814. S2CID 144989143.
- Roy, Aruna (2015). "Determining destinies: building transparency and accountability through citizen involvement". In Mudgal, Vipul (ed.). Claiming India from Below: Activism and Democratic Transformation. Routledge. pp. 261–276. doi:10.4324/9781315665467. ISBN 978-1-315-66546-7.
- Roy, Aruna; Dav, Eacute; K, S. (2020). "Analysing Kerala's Response to the COVID-19 Pandemic". Economic and Political Weekly. World Health Organization: 18.

=== Non-fiction ===
- Roy, Aruna; MKSS Collective (2018). The RTI Story: Power to the People. Roli Books. ISBN 978-81-937049-1-2.
- Dey, Nikhil; Roy, Aruna; Swamy, Rakshita (2020). We the People: Establishing Rights and Deepening Democracy. Rethinking India Series. Penguin Random House. ISBN 978-93-5305-877-7.

=== Miscellaneous ===
- Mittal, Sunil; Roy, Aruna (2011). "Livelihoods and Job Creation". In Nilekani, Rohini (ed.). Uncommon Ground: Dialogues between Business and Social Leaders. Penguin Books Limited. ISBN 978-81-8475-584-8.
- Roy, Aruna (2017). "An Indian Feminist at Seventy". In Razdan, Nidhi (ed.). Left, Right and Centre: The Idea of India. Penguin Random House. ISBN 978-93-86651-58-7.
- Roy, Aruna; Dey, Nikhil; Kashyap, Praavita (2018). "Allowing people to shape our democratic future". In Kothari, Ashish; Joy, K. J. (eds.). Alternative Futures: India Unshackled. AuthorsUpFront. pp. 120–137. ISBN 978-93-87280-09-0.
