= Tamil Nadu Lokayukta =

Anti-corruption Ombudsman for the state of Tamil Nadu

Agency overview
- Formed: 2018

Jurisdictional structure
- Federal agency: India
- Operations jurisdiction: India
- General nature: Federal law enforcement

Operational structure
- Headquarters: Chennai
- Agency executive: Hon’ble Shri Justice P. Raja manickam., Lokayukta

Website
- https://tamilnadulokayukta.tn.gov.in/en/home/

Tamil Nadu Lokayukta is the Parliamentary Ombudsman for the state of Tamil Nadu (India). It is a high level statutory functionary, created to address grievances of the public against ministers, legislators, administration and public servants in issues related to misuse of power, mal-administration and corruption. It was first formed under the Tamil Nadu Lokayukta and Deputy Lokayukta Act-2018 and approved by the president of India. With The Lokpal and Lokayuktas Act, 2013 adopted by the Indian Parliament coming into force on 16 January 2014, each state in India was required to appoint its Lokayukta within a year. According to the 2013 law, the Lokayukta bench should consist of judicial and non-judicial members. An Upa-Lokayukta is a deputy to Lokayukta and assists in her or his work and acts as the in-charge Lokayukta in case the position falls vacant prematurely.

A Lokayukta of the state is appointed to office by the state Governor after consulting the committee consisting of State Chief Minister, Speaker of Legislative Assembly, Leader of Opposition, or leader of largest opposition party in State Legislature, Chairman of Legislative Council and Leader of Opposition of Legislative Council and cannot be removed from office except for reasons specified in the Act and will serve the period of five years.

== History and administration ==
Tamil Nadu Lokayukta Act-2018 was passed in July 2018 in the Tamil Nadu Assembly and was effective from 13 November 2018. Tamil Nadu governor appointed a five member Lokayukta headed by former judge P. Devadass. The other members are retired Indian Administrative Service officer Rajaram M and K. Arumugam, advocate as non-judicial members and K. Jayabalan, ex district judges and Krishnamoorthy R as judicial members. Lokayukta appointed and other members of the team will hold office for a period of five years from the day of appointed or attaining age of 70, whichever is earlier. The five member Lokayukta was finalised by three member search committee headed by K. Venkataraman, a Retired High Court judge as the chairperson and R. Krishnamoorthy, Former Advocate General and A. Pari, retired IPS officer as other members of the search committee. As per the Tamil Nadu Lokayukta bill, a person serving or retired as high court judge, or a person with combined experience in public administration, finance and legal, vigilance, anti-corruption policies, for a period of 25 years should head the position of Lokayukta. No complaints against the Lokayukta or its members will be entertained as per this Act.

Penalty of Rs one lakh or one year imprisonment will be imposed on persons making wrong complaints.

All proceedings of the Lokayukta will be private and in-camera and will not be open to the public or media.

== Oath or affirmation ==
"I, <name>, having been appointed Lokayukta (or Upa-Lokayukta) do swear in the name of God (or solemnly affirm) that I will bear faith and allegiance to the Constitution of India as by law established and I will duly and faithfully and to the best of my ability, knowledge and judgment perform the duties of my office without fear or favour, affection or ill-will."

— First Schedule, Tamil Nadu Lokayukta and Deputy Lokayukta Act-2018

== Powers ==
Tamil Nadu Lokayukta has complete and exclusive authority for enquiring into allegations or complaints against the State Chief Minister, State Deputy Chief Minister, Ministers of the state Government, Leader of Opposition and Government officials and the same can be forwarded to the Registrar. The complaint to be valid should not be anonymous.

The Lokayukta has powers to order initial enquiry on complaint against any Government official or agency to ascertain the genuiness of the complaint and to determine if there is a case prima-facie to continue the investigation. It can summon and examine any person and document its evidence in affidavits. Its investigation department will have a civil court powers under the Criminal Procedure Code,1908.

== Appointment and tenure ==
First Lokayukta of Tamil Nadu is Justice P. Devadass, a former retired judge of High Court who will head a five member team and will have a term of five years or reaching of the age of 70 years, whichever is earlier.

Lokayukta Chairperson will be appointed by Governor along with other members who are recommended by a committee headed by Chief Minister and other members being Speaker of Assembly and Opposition Leader in Assembly, or elected leader of the largest opposition party in the Assembly.

== See also ==
- Lokpal and Lokayukta Act 2013
- Goa Lokayukta
- Karnataka Lokayukta
- Andhra Pradesh Lokayukta
