= National Campaign for People's Right to Information =

National Campaign for People's Right to Information (NCPRI) was established in 1996 to advocate for a legal backing to citizens right to information. This resulted in the historic and pro-people law - the Right to Information Act, 2005. More recently, this movement has also campaigned for Grievance redressal bill and Whistleblowers protection bill. It is a network of organisations and individuals who use the Right to Information law to demand transparency and accountability of government, but also support the use of the RTI in various other sectors to demand accountability.

== History ==
The campaign has its roots in the work and experiences of the Mazdoor Kisan Shakti Sangathan. It was established in 1996 at a gathering of more than a hundred activist organisations. Later that year, it drafted the first version of a Right to Information Law in India, along with the Press Council of India. The city of Beawar now has an official plaque that pays tribute to the Chang Gate protest which has a pivotal moment in the fight for the RTI.

== Anti-Corruption Bills ==
The National Campaign for People's Right to Information demanded the Whistleblowers Protection Bill, 2011, be amended, including by a clearer definition of victimization, protection for persons other than the whistleblowers who provide relevant information, penalty for mala fide revelation of the identity of whistleblowers, a time limit for complaints and provision for filing anonymous complaints.

The campaign has steadily fought for the passage of the Whistleblower Protection bill since September 2010. As a part of public action for the passage of the bill, families of whistleblowers gathered in Delhi to demand the immediate passage of the bill. The Whistleblower Protection bill was passed on 21 February 2014.

The other Bill that the NCPRI advocated for was a Grievance Redressal Bill.

== Affiliate Organisations & Resources ==
There are several organizations and individuals that are part of the NCPRI eco-system.

1. Commonwealth Human Rights Initiative (CHRI)
2. Mazdoor Kisan Shakti Sangathan (MKSS)
3. Swadeshi Jagran Manch
4. Satark Nagrik Sangathan (SNS India)

== Important RTI's ==
1. On Electoral Bonds: - SBI received Rs. 3.47 crore as commission, Dec 2020 - Rs. 1000 Electoral Bond unclaimed - Quantity of Bonds sold since 2018 - 2/3 donations to parties via bonds - More Party Funding, Ever More Opaque

== Important Television Debates, Articles, Interviews, Books & Lectures ==
1. 15 Years of RTI, Nikhil Dey in Frontline Magazine, December 2020
2. Pustak Lokarpan Lecture by Aruna Roy, November 2020
3. Bhaskar Prabhu on Brihanmumbai Municipal Corporation
4. Six Years On, Lokpal is a Non-Starter, The Hindu
5. Moneylife Foundation Annual RTI Lectures: "Is Good Governance the Right of a Citizen in Democracy?", Sept 2019
6. 5 November 2001, Noam Chomsky on 'Militarism, Democracy and People's Right to Information' at the Delhi School of Economics
7. Capturing Institutional Change: The Case of the Right to Information Act in India, 2021, by Himanshu Jha

== NCPRI Conventions, Public Meetings, Activities & Hearings ==
1. Jan Manch on Electoral Bonds, RTI Amendments & Whistleblower Protection Bill, December 2019

== Campaigns of NCPRI ==
- Right to Information
- Right to Reject
- Right to be left alone
- Digital Free Speech initiative
- India Against Corruption
- Electoral Reforms

== Recent activities ==
The National Campaign for People's Right to Information met the Prime Minister on 19 August 2013 to submit a petition seeking deferring amendments related to the exclusion of the political parties from the ambit of the Right to Information Act.

Dhananjay Dubey, brother of murdered whistleblower Satyendra Dubey, and the National Campaign for People's Right to Information started a petition signed by over 10,000 people demanding the immediate passage of the Whistleblower Protection and Grievance Redress bills.

The NCPRI supports and endorses efforts towards accountability and transparency in various domains.
