= Lokpal and Lokayuktas Act, 2013 =

Act of the Parliament of India

Parliament of India
- Long title: An Act to provide for the establishment of a body of Lokpal for the Union and Lokayukta for States to inquire into allegations of corruption against certain public functionaries and for matters connected therewith or incidental thereto.
- Citation: Act No. 1 of 2014
- Territorial extent: India
- Passed by: Lok Sabha
- Passed: 27 December 2011
- Passed by: Rajya Sabha
- Passed: 17 December 2013
- Assented to: 1 January 2014
- Signed by: Pranab Mukherjee
- Commenced: 16 January 2014

Legislative history

Initiating chamber: Lok Sabha
- Bill title: Lokpal and Lokayuktas Bill, 2011
- Bill citation: Bill No. 134 of 2011
- Introduced by: V. Narayanasamy, MoS in the Ministry of Personnel, Public Grievances and Pensions
- Introduced: 22 December 2011
- Passed: 27 December 2011

Revising chamber: Rajya Sabha
- Passed: 17 December 2013

Final stages
- Rajya Sabha amendments considered by the Lok Sabha: 18 December 2013
- Finally passed both chambers: 18 December 2013
- Status: In force

The Lokpal and Lokayuktas Act, 2013, commonly known as the Lokpal Act, is an anti-corruption Act of Indian Parliament which "seeks to provide for the establishment of the institution of Lokpal to inquire into allegations of corruption against certain important public functionaries including the Prime Minister, cabinet ministers, members of parliament, Group A officials of the Central Government and for matters connecting them".

The Bill was tabled in the Lok Sabha, the lower house of Indian parliament, on 22 December 2011 and was passed by the House on 27 December as The Lokpal and Lokayuktas Bill, 2011. It was subsequently tabled in the Rajya Sabha, the upper house, on 29 December. After a marathon debate that stretched until midnight of the following day, the vote failed to take place for lack of time. On 21 May 2012, it was referred to a Select Committee of the Rajya Sabha for consideration. It was passed in the Rajya Sabha on 17 December 2013, after certain amendments were made to the earlier Bill, and in the Lok Sabha the next day. It received assent from President Pranab Mukherjee on 1 January 2014 and came into force on 16 January.

The Bill had been introduced in the parliament following massive public protests led by anti-corruption crusader Anna Hazare and his associates. The Bill was one of the most widely discussed and debated Bills in India, both by the media and the people of India at large, in recent times. The Hazare-led protests were named among the "Top 10 News Stories of 2011" by Time magazine. The bill received worldwide media coverage.

Retired Supreme Court judge Pinaki Chandra Ghose was appointed as the first Lokpal of India by a committee consisting of Prime Minister Narendra Modi and Chief Justice of India Ranjan Gogoi and Lok Sabha speaker Sumitra Mahajan and eminent jurist Mukul Rohatgi on 17 March 2019.

== Background ==
The term Lokpal was coined in 1963 by Laxmi Mall Singhvi, a member of parliament during a parliamentary debate about grievance mechanisms. The Administrative Reforms Commission (ARC) headed by Morarji Desai submitted an interim report on "Problems of Redressal of Citizen's Grievances" in 1966. In this report, ARC recommended the creation of two special authorities designated as 'Lokpal' and 'Lokayukta' for redress of citizens' grievances. The word was derived from the Sanskrit words "Lok" (people) and "Pala" (protector/caretaker), meaning 'Caretaker of People'.

Maharashtra was the first state to introduce Lokayukta through The Maharashtra Lokayukta and Upa-Lokayuktas Act in 1971. Presently, there are no Lokayuktas in the states of Andhra Pradesh, Arunachal Pradesh, Jammu and Kashmir, Manipur, Meghalaya, Mizoram, Nagaland, Sikkim, Tamil Nadu, Tripura.

The Lokpal bill was first introduced in the Lok Sabha in 1968. The version enacted in 2013 was from a draft prepared in 2010. The bill is an implementation of the Prevention of Corruption Act, 1988. Eleven parliamentary panels have been formed to discuss the Lokpal bill.

The Act for each state says “Every State shall establish a body to be known as the Lokayukta for the State, if not so established, constituted or appointed, by a law made by the State Legislature, to deal with complaints relating to corruption against certain public functionaries, within a period of one year from the date of commencement of this Act”.

Recurring cost of lokpal over the years
Year	Cost of lokpal (recurring)	Status of bill
1968	₹300,000	The Fourth Lok Sabha dissolved before the bill could be passed by the Rajya Sabha. The bill lapsed.
1971	₹2 million	This bill lapsed on dissolution of the Fifth Lok Sabha.
1977	₹2.5 million	The Sixth Lok Sabha dissolved just before the recommendations of the Joint Select Committee could be considered.
1985	₹2.5 million	This bill was withdrawn by the government.
1989	₹3.5 million	This bill lapsed on dissolution of the Ninth Lok Sabha.
1996	₹10 million	The Standing Committee presented its report to Parliament on 9 May 1996. However, the Lok Sabha was dissolved before government could finalise its stand.
1998	₹10 million	The Twelfth Lok Sabha was dissolved before government could take a view on the recommendations made by The Parliamentary Standing Committee.
2001	₹15 million	The Lok Sabha was dissolved. Hence, the bill lapsed.
2011/2012	The Government's version of Lokpal does not have any financial memorandum.	Passed by the Lok Sabha and Rajya Sabha. Rajya Sabha passed the bill on 17 December 2013. Lok sabha passed the bill on 18 December 2013.

== History ==
=== 2010 draft bill ===
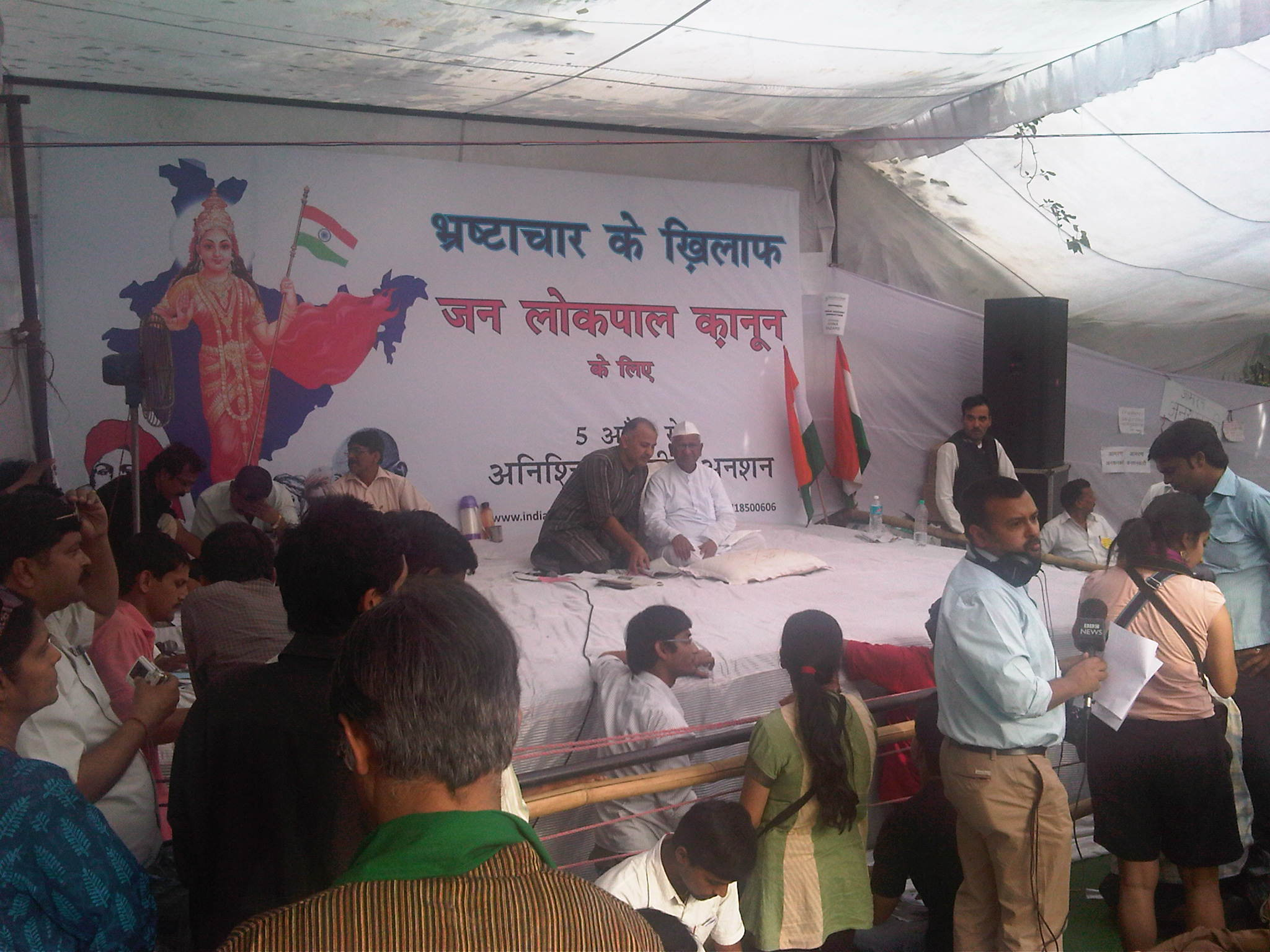
Anna Hazare's hunger strike at Jantar Mantar in New Delhi

The 2010 draft was created by the United Progressive Alliance to create an Ombudsman tasked with tackling political corruption. The draft was circulated to various ministries for their review. It provided a mechanism for filing complaints against the prime minister, ministers and MPs. However, civil society groups were not satisfied and rejected it as a toothless body with only recommendatory powers.

Hazare started an indefinite hunger strike on 5 April 2011 to pressure the government to create an ombudsman with the power to deal with corruption in public places as envisaged in the Jan Lokpal Bill. The fast led to nationwide protests in support. The fast ended on 9 April, one day after the government accepted his demands. The government issued a gazette notification on the formation of a joint committee, consisting of government and civil society representatives, to draft the legislation.

=== Joint draft bill ===
A Joint Drafting Committee was established, consisting of five ministers and five members of the civil society. The chairman of the Joint Drafting Committee was Pranab Mukherjee. The Committee set 30 June 2011 as the deadline to complete the drafting process.

Ten member Joint Drafting Committee
Member Name	Party
Pranab Mukherjee	Union Minister of Finance
P. Chidambaram	Union Minister of Home Affairs
M. Veerappa Moily	Union Minister of Law and Justice
Kapil Sibal	Minister of Communication and Information Technology
Salman Khursheed	Union Minister of Water Resources
Anna Hazare	Civil society
N. Santosh Hegde	Civil Society, Retired Judge Supreme Court of India
Shanti Bhushan	Civil Society, Former Union Minister of Law and Justice
Prashant Bhushan	Civil Society
Arvind Kejriwal	Civil Society

==== First draft meeting ====
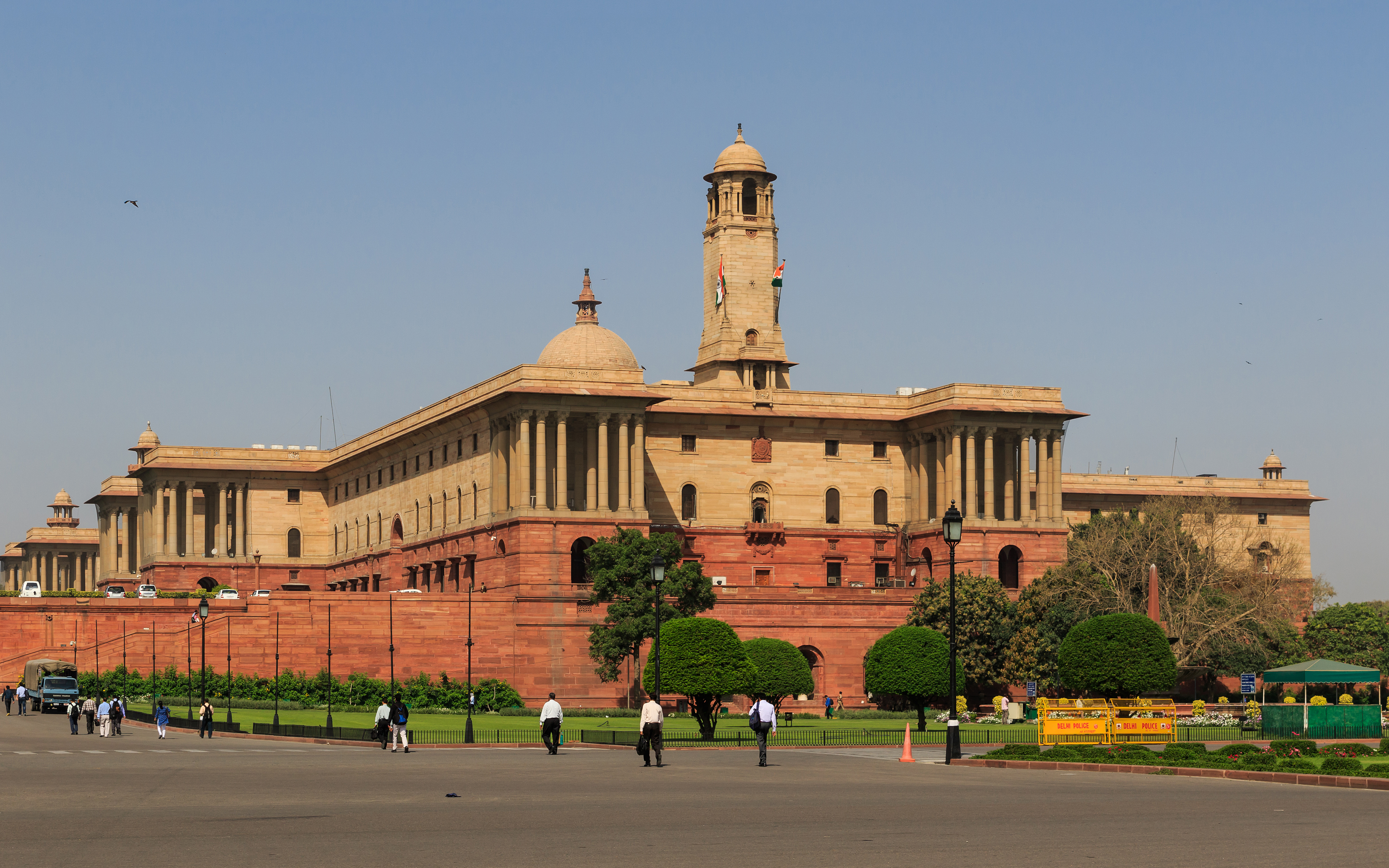
All of the Joint Draft meetings took place at the North Block

The Committee first met on 16 April 2011, in the North Block and lasted for about ninety minutes. Team Anna presented their version of the bill with a slight modification relating to the selection panel to choose the Lokpal and its members. Under the revised proposal, the Prime Minister and the Leader of the Opposition in the Lok Sabha were replaced with the Rajya Sabha chairman and the Lok Sabha Speaker. The meeting was allegedly recorded and the Committee claimed that decisions would be made available to the general public. HRD Minister and Committee member Kapil Sibal, said that both the sides were keen that the new Bill should be introduced in the Monsoon session, which would begin early July.

==== Second draft meeting ====
The Committee met as planned on 2 May 2011. The meeting was termed "very good" and with "no difference of opinion" between the panel members. Sibal said that the meeting discussed the document presented previously by the civil society members. Prashant Bhushan said, "The meeting was mainly to discuss the basic principles behind the Jan Lokpal Bill. The discussion was on essential features, objects and reasons of the bill which have been prepared according to the main provisions of the UN Convention against Corruption. All signatories of the United Nations Convention against Corruption have to pass this kind of law." In May 2011, the Indian Government had ratified two UN Conventions – the United Nations Convention against Corruption (UNCAC) and the United Nations Convention against Transnational Organised Crime (UNTOC) and its three protocols.

==== Third draft meeting ====
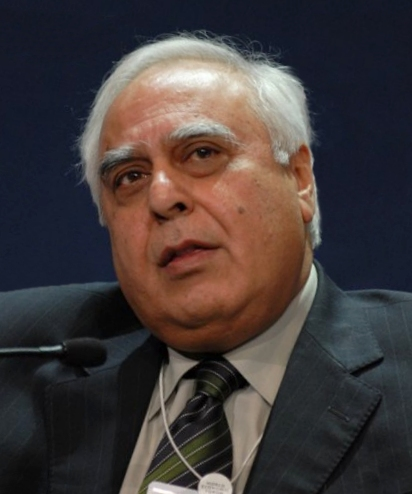
Kapil Sibbal, member of the Joint Drafting Committee of Lokpal

After the third meeting on 7 May 2011, Bhushan said "Lokpal will have powers to initiate investigation and prosecution and will not need permission from the government. The model on which the financial independence will be based is yet to be decided. Various models were discussed, including from other countries and of institutions like the Supreme Court, the Comptroller and Auditor General and the Central Vigilance Commission."

Kapil Sibal said the meeting was "exceptionally constructive" and added, "The approach was very constructive. There were areas of broad agreement, including the process of appointment of Lokpal which should be transparent." Another group of civil society members led by Aruna Roy and Harsh Mander working for a strong Lokpal Bill, upped its ante against Team Anna. Under the banner of the "National Campaign for People's Right to Information" (NCPRI) they claimed that Anna's diktat could be dangerous and that the government's functioning could not be handled by one group.

==== Fourth draft meeting ====
The 23 May meeting in 2011 lasted over three hours and the two sides agreed "in-principle" on half of the 40 basic principles for the anti-graft Lokpal bill proposed by the civil society members.

==== Fifth draft meeting ====
At the 30 May 2011 meeting the chairman made it clear during the discussion that the matters pertaining to the exclusion of Prime Minister, Judiciary would be a part of the discussions on the scope of the Lokpal. The Chairman of the Panel announced that the conduct of the MPs' inside Parliament would remain outside its remit of the Lokpal to comply with [Article 105(2)] of the Constitution and that the views of the State and the political parties would be discussed with the civil society members. These announcements created a stalemate between the committee's two-halves.

==== Sixth draft meeting ====
Team Anna boycotted 6 June 2011 meeting, alleging that the police crackdown on Baba Ramdev had "strengthened the doubts" about the government's intentions and demanded that the next meeting be rescheduled because of Hazare's other commitments. Shanti Bhushan produced a letter that was read by the Chair "indicating their inability to attend the meeting" and "that what happened at the Ramlila ground had nothing to do with the proceedings of the Joint Drafting Committee". The chairman suggested that the drafting should be the focus. Post meeting, the draft was to be circulated to the other political parties for their consideration. They rescheduled the seventh meeting to 15 June.

==== Seventh draft meeting ====
The two-hour event took place on 15 June 2011, without agreement on several issues. Both sides furnished versions to the Union Cabinet for consideration. Team Anna blamed the government for not being serious, claiming "The government is planning to kill Lokpal before it's born". The civil society members suggested that the Lokpal be empowered to probe corruption cases in instead of the departmental probes and CBI inquiries of the prior approach. The government rejected the idea. Chief Ministers of several BJP-ruled states expressed surprise that they were being consulted before the final draft was ready. Chief ministers of Congress-ruled states backed the Centre's stand and opposed bringing the prime minister under the Lokpal's ambit. BJP-ruled states sought wider deliberations. Opposition parties demanded to comment on the whole bill rather than on the six contentious issues. Anna Team demanded that the audio of the proceedings be made available to them. Hazare threatened to resume an indefinite fast if the bill was not passed by 15 August.

Comparison of Draft Lokpal Bill with the Jan Lokpal Bill
Issues	Draft Lokpal Bill, 2011 (government representatives)	Draft Jan Lokpal Bill, 2011 (nominees of Anna Hazare)
Composition	Chairperson and 10 members (at least 4 judicial members)	Chairperson and 10 members (at least 4 members with legal background). The chairperson to have extensive knowledge of law.
Tenure	Five years or till he is 70 years	Five years or till he is 70 years
Manner of appointment	Presidential appointment on the recommendation of the selection committee.	Presidential appointment on the recommendation of the selection committee.
Committee membership	Prime Minister, speaker, Leader of the House of which PM is not member, Minister of Home Affairs, Leader of the Opposition in both Houses, judge of Supreme Court, Chief Justice of a High Court, President of National Academy of Science, Cabinet Secretary (secretary of committee).	Prime Minister, Leader of the Opposition in the Lok Sabha, 2 judges of the Supreme Court, 2 chief justices of a high court, the Chief Election Commission, the CAG, and all previous chairpersons of the Lokpal. The members shall be selected from a list prepared by the Search Committee (10 members including civil society representatives).
Qualification	Impeccable integrity with at least 25 years of experience in public affairs, academics, commerce, finance etc. Once appointed, cannot be an MP, MLA or be connected with a political party, business or practice a profession. A judicial member has to be either a Chief Justice of the High Court or a judge of the Supreme Court.	A judicial member should have held judicial office for at least 10 years or been an advocate of the High Court or Supreme Court for at least 15 years. All members should be of impeccable integrity with record of public service especially in the field of corruption. Must be a citizen of India at least 45 years old. Must have no case involving moral turpitude framed against him by a court. Cannot have been a government servant within the last 2 years.
Removal	Complaint against members are made to the President who may refer it to the Supreme Court who will conduct an inquiry. The President may remove the member, on the opinion of the Chief Justice, on grounds of bias, corruption, insolvency, paid employment or infirmity.	The President removes members on the recommendation of the Supreme Court made within 3 months of a complaint. Grounds for removal: misbehavior, infirmity, insolvency, paid employment outside the office. An Independent Complaints Authority at the state level inquires into complaints against Lokpal staff.
Jurisdiction	All corruption cases under the Prevention of Corruption Act, 1988. It covers MPs, Ministers, 'Group A' officers, 'Group A' officers in a company or body owned by the government, any officer of a government-financed society or trust or funded by Foreign Contribution (Regulation) Act, 1976 or that gets funds from the public. Excludes PM, judiciary and any action of an MP in the Parliament or Committee.	Offences by a public servant, including government employees, judges, MPs, Ministers, and the Prime Minister under the Indian Penal Code and the 1988 Corruption Act. Any offence committed by an MP in respect of a speech or vote in the House; wilfully giving or taking benefit from a person. Victimizing a whistleblower or witness.
Investigation	Lokpal must conduct a preliminary inquiry within 30 days. If there is no prima facie case, the matter is closed. Given a prima facie case, Lokpal investigates after providing a suitable forum to the accused. The investigation must be completed within six months with an optional six-month extension after giving reasons in writing. No sanction shall be required by the Lokpal to investigate any complaint against a public servant.	When investigating corruption cases, the CBI works under the Lokpal. Investigation of the Prime Minister, Ministers, MPs and judges of the Supreme Court or High Courts require the permission of a 7-member bench of the Lokpal. Investigations can last 6 to 18 months. Investigation of whistleblower complaints who are in danger of victimisation, must be completed within 3 months.
Prosecution	The Lokpal may constitute a prosecution wing headed by a director who files cases in the Special Court (to be constituted by the central government on recommendation of the Lokpal). Trials must complete within one year, which may be extended to two years for reasons given in writing. No sanction is required to file a case against a public servant. The Lokpal files cases in the Special Court and sends a copy of the report to the competent authority. Procedure for persons other than MPs and ministers: The competent authority is the Minister for officers of government bodies and the society head for officers of societies. The Lokpal recommends disciplinary proceedings to the competent authority and provides a copy of the report to the accused. The competent authority must take action within 30 days and inform the Lokpal within 6 months of initiating disciplinary proceedings. Procedure for MPs and ministers: The competent authority is the PM for Ministers and the Lok Sabha or Rajya Sabha for MPs. The Speaker/Chairman tables the report in Parliament. The House reports to the Lokpal on any action taken within 90 days.	The CBI's prosecution wing moves under Lokpal. After an investigation is completed, the Lokpal may either initiate prosecution against the accused or impose penalty or both. The Lokpal can initiate prosecution in the Special Court formed under the Prevention of Corruption Act, 1988. The Lokpal shall appoint retired judges or retired civil servants as judicial officers. A bench of judicial officers can impose a penalty on a public servant after conducting an inquiry. The decision shall be subject to approval from a higher authority to be prescribed. Prosecution can be initiated against the Prime Minister, Ministers, MPs and judge of the Supreme Court or High Courts only with permission of a 7-member bench of the Lokpal. If the Lokpal grants permission to investigate or initiate prosecution, no sanction is required from any other authority.
Penalty	Any person making false and frivolous or vexatious complaints shall be penalised with 2 to 5 years of jail and fine of ₹25,000 to ₹200,000.	For any act of corruption, the penalty shall be from six months to life imprisonment. If the beneficiary for an offence is a business entity, a fine of up to five times the loss caused to the public shall be recovered. If a company director is convicted, the company shall be blacklisted from any government contract. Convicted public servants are removed from office. Persons making a false complaint, are fined up to ₹100,000. False complaints against a member of the Lokpal may result in 3 months imprisonment.
Funding	Paid by Consolidated Fund of India.	Paid by Consolidated Fund of India. The budget of the Lokpal should not be less than 0.25 percent of total government revenue. No sanction required from government to incur expenditure. The CAG audits Lokpal and a Parliamentary Committee evaluates Lokpal operations.
Other powers	The Lokpal can search and seize documents, attach property for 90 days, file for confirming the attachment within 30 days, and recommend suspension of the accused.	The Lokpal can receive complaints from whistle-blowers, issue search warrants, attach property, recommend cancellation/modification of a lease or license or blacklist a company. If recommendation of Lokpal is not accepted it can approach the High Court. A bench of the Lokpal can approve interception and monitoring of messages transmitted through telephone or internet.

=== Union Cabinet approved bill ===
The government moved its version of the bill in the Lok Sabha on 4 August, the ninth such introduction. The bill was introduced by the Minister of State in the Prime Minister's Office, V Narayanasamy. Leader of Opposition Sushma Swaraj opposed the exclusion of the prime minister from the purview of the proposed Lokpal. V Narayanasamy told the House that Prime Minister Manmohan Singh was in favour of bringing his office under the purview of the Lokpal, but the Cabinet rejected the idea after deliberation. Anna Hazare burnt copies of the bill, to protest the government's lack of sincerity.

On 27 August the Lok Sabha and Rajya Sabha passed a Pranab Mukherjee-proposed resolution conveying the sense of the House on the Lokpal Bill. The House agreed 'in principle' on a Citizen's Charter, placing the lower bureaucracy under the Lokpal and establishing the Lokayukta in the States.

The Act was finally notified by President of India on 1 January 2014, after getting approved in both Houses of Parliament and Union Cabinet, providing for setting up of an institution of Lokpal, to be headed by a chairperson, who is or has been a Chief Justice of India, or is or has been a judge of the Supreme Court, or a person of eminence fulfilling the eligibility criteria as specified in the Act. The Act also provides for the appointment of other members, which shall not exceed eight, of which 50% are to be judicial members, and among others not less than 50% of the members belong to the Scheduled Castes, Scheduled Tribes, OBCs, minorities, and women.

The Act provides for the appointment of a director of inquiry who shall not be below the rank of Joint Secretary to the Government of India and shall be appointed by the Central government for conducting preliminary inquiries in respect of public servants belonging to groups A, B, C or D and who are referred by the Lokpal to the Central Vigilance Commission (CVC).

=== Standing Committee bill ===
31-member committee consisting of 25 MPs belonging to 22 political parties with 6 seats vacant
Member Name	Party	Member Of
Abhishek Manu Singhvi	Congress	Rajya Sabha
Chandresh Kumari	Congress	Lok Sabha
N. S. V. Chitthan	Congress	Lok Sabha
Deepa Dashmunsi	Congress	Lok Sabha
Prabha Kishore Taviad	Congress	Lok Sabha
Manish Tewari	Congress	Lok Sabha
P. T. Thomas (Idukki)	Congress	Lok Sabha
Meenakshi Natrajan	Congress	Lok Sabha
Balavant alias Bal Apte	BJP	Rajya Sabha
D. B. Chandre Gowda	BJP	Lok Sabha
Harin Pathak	BJP	Lok Sabha
Jyoti Dhurve	BJP	Lok Sabha
Devji M Patel	BJP	Lok Sabha
Parimal Nathwani	Independent	Rajya Sabha
Amar Singh	Independent	Rajya Sabha
Kirodi Lal Meena	Independent	Lok Sabha
Ram Jethmalani	Nominated Member	Rajya Sabha
Ram Vilas Paswan	LJSP	Rajya Sabha
O. T. Lepcha	SDF	Rajya Sabha
Lalu Prasad	RJD	Lok Sabha
Shailendra Kumar	SP	Lok Sabha
Monazir Hassan	JD(U)	Lok Sabha
S. Semmalai	AIADMK	Lok Sabha
Vijay Bahadur Singh	BSP	Lok Sabha
R. Thamaraiselvan	DMK	Lok Sabha

The Jan Lokpal Bill was submitted to the committee by Congress MP from Bareilly Praveen Singh Aron. The draft bill was distributed to members on 28 November. The committee recommended keeping judiciary and MPs' out of the Lokpal's purview and rejected the demand to move the prosecution wing of CBI under its jurisdiction. Committee members had unanimously recommended conferring constitutional status on the Lokpal and setting up of Lokpal and Lokayuktas in states under one bill. The draft document did not take a position on the inclusion of prime minister. Another of Team Anna's demands for inclusion of entire bureaucracy was turned down, given that the draft favoured inclusion of Group A and B officials, leaving out C and D staff. Anna Hazare rejected this draft.

At the final meeting on 7 December they decided to bring Group C and D officers under the ambit of state Lokayuktas. Sixteen dissent notes were submitted at the meeting by members from BJP, BJD, SP, Congress, RJD and the Left.

== Enactment by the Lok Sabha ==
The Lokpal Bill was tabled in the Lok Sabha on 22 December 2011 and passed by voice voting on the first day of the three-day extended session of the Winter session of the Lok Sabha, on 27 December 2011, after a marathon debate that lasted over 10 hours. The lokpal body was not given the constitutional status as the Constitutional Amendment Bill, which provided for making the Lokpal a constitutional body, was defeated in the house. The Prime Minister described this as "a bit of disappointment", adding, "We have, however, fulfilled our objective of bringing these bills to Parliament as we had promised." The bill passed by the house was termed "useless" by Team Anna, who reiterated their view that there was no need to give constitutional status to such a weak Lokpal.

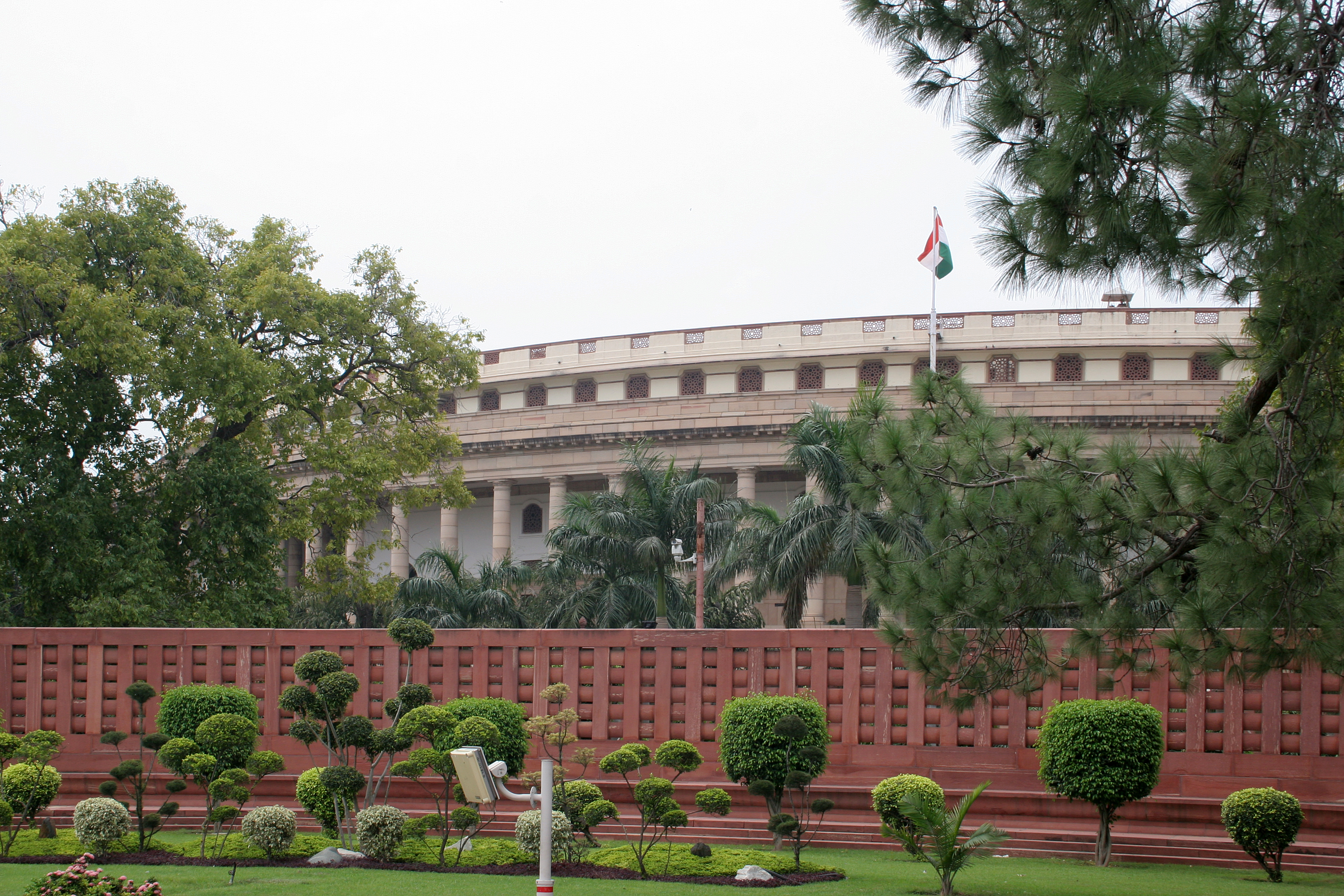
The bill was passed in the Lok Sabha. But, it is pending in the Rajya Sabha

The government withdrew its previous version and had introduced a newer version of the bill. RJD leader Lalu Prasad, along with the support from the other parties like SP, AIMMM and LJP, demanded an inclusion of candidates from minorities in the nine member Lokpal Bench. The government gave in to the demands of parties. The principal opposition party, the BJP, objected to it, classifying that such a move was illegal and asked the government to withdraw the bill. BJD, JDU, RJD, SP, TDP and Left said the bill was weak and wanted it to be withdrawn.

The bill passed by the house deleted the provision that gave presiding officers the power to act against ministers and MPs, even before trial, but the exemption time of former MPs was increased from five to seven years. It excluded armed forces and coast guard from the purview of the anti-graft body. The lokpal would take complaints against the prime minister after the consent of two-thirds of the Lokpal panel. The consent of state governments is mandatory for the notification to set up Lokayuktas in the states, but the setting up of them in the states was made mandatory. The appointment panel is loaded in favour of the government. The Lokpal Bill was passed under Article 252 of the constitution of India. The Prime Minister said, "We believe that the CBI should function without interference through any Government diktat. But no institution and no individual, howsoever high he may be, should be free from accountability."

The Left, Samajwadi Party and BSP staged a walkout during voting of the bill, protesting that their demands were not being met. At least 15 Congress members and close to a dozen belonging to UPA allies were not present at the time of voting. The house also secured the passage of the Whistleblowers Bill.

== Journey through The Rajya Sabha ==
=== Winter session, 2011 ===
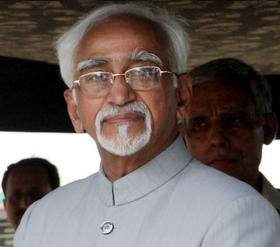
Hamid Ansari, Chairman of the Rajya Sabha, adjourned the house sine die

The ombudsman debate was taken up by The Rajya Sabha during the last day of the three-day extension of the winter session of Parliament, but the body recessed on 29 December without voting. The bill was debated for over 12 hours ending abruptly at midnight as the House ran out of scheduled time. The House was adjourned sine die by Chairman Hamid Ansari. A verbal duel marred proceedings as some members including UPA ally Trinamool Congress interrupted V. Narayanasamy's defence of the Bill. A vociferous opposition insisted on a vote while the government maintained it needed time to reconcile the 187 amendments/ Confusion marked the proceedings. Ansari asked for the national anthem Jana Gana Mana to be played, signalling the end of the proceedings and told the house:

This is an unprecedented situation…there appears to be a desire to outshout each other. There is a total impasse. The House cannot be conducted in the noise that requires orderly proceedings, I am afraid the Chair has no option…most reluctantly…I am afraid I can't and…

After a 15-minute adjournment between 11.30 and 11.45 PM, Pawan Kumar Bansal said that the decision on extension of the House was the government's prerogative. Leader of the Opposition Arun Jaitley charged that the government was running away from Parliament and that the House should decide how long it should sit. He added:

You are creating an institution where you control the appointment mechanism, where you control the removal mechanism. We will support the appointment of the Lokpal procedures, but we cannot be disloyal to our commitment to create an integrity institution.

Sitaram Yechury (CPI-M) said the House had expected the bill on Wednesday, but it came only on Thursday, the last day of the session. Derek O'Brien said "This is a shameful day for India's democracy. The government handled this situation very badly." As the Opposition insisted on a vote, Bansal said the government was willing provided that the House passed the Bill voted by the Lok Sabha on Tuesday. This meant that the proposed amendments would have to be set aside.

As stalemate and wrangling continued, the chairman called an end to the proceedings. Chidambaram defended the deferment of Lokpal and Lokayukta Bill, 2011 in Rajya Sabha on 29 December contending that it was the "only prudent course" before the government and that it had ensured that the Bill remained alive. He continued to attack the BJP and called the amendments an "ingenious" method to scuttle the bill. Hazare called off his hunger strike prematurely, blaming poor health.

=== Budget session, 2012 ===
Members of the panel proposed by the government
Member Name	Party
Shantaram Naik	Congress
Satyavrat Chaturvedi	Congress
Shadi Lal Batra	Congress
Arun Jaitley	BJP
Rajiv Pratap Rudy	BJP
Bhupendra Yadav	BJP
KN Balagopal	CPM
Shivanand Tiwari	JD-U
Tiruchi Shiva	DMK
Satish Mishra	BSP
D Bandyopadhyay	Trinamool Congress
Ramgopal Yadav	SP
DP Tripathi	NCP
V Maitreyan	AIADMK
AK Ganguly	Nominated

Activists pushing hoped that the House would approve the bill towards the end of the second half of the budget session of 2012. The bill was re-introduced in the Rajya Sabha on 21 May 2012. While moving the bill, the minister said that the differences had been narrowed. He said that the government proposed to bring the lower bureaucracy under the Lokpal, which would have investigation and prosecution powers. CVC would monitor Lokpal-referred investigations by the CBI. There would be provisions for attaching properties and a time-frame for investigations. An amendment was proposed whereby the states would pass the bill so the national law would not be forced upon states. After the amended bill was introduced, Narayanasamy, Samajwadi Party member Naresh Agrawal sought to send the bill to a select committee. This was strongly objected to by BJP, the Left parties and BSP, with their members arguing that only the minister concerned (Narayanasamy) could do so and accusing the ruling coalition of "using the shoulder" of a "friendly opposition" party. After high drama the government yielded and Narayanasamy moved the motion, which immediately passed by voice vote. The 15-member select committee was to submit its report by the first day of the last week of the Monsoon Session.

The committee met on 25 June and decided on "wider consultations" with the government officials and the public. The panel invited public comments and called representatives of various ministries for recording evidence. The meeting was headed by senior Congress MP Satyavrat Chaturvedi. Law Secretary B A Agarwal was summoned to clarify various matters. The committee met again on 19 July 2012. The director of the CBI aired his views in the meeting. He made it clear that the CBI is open to changes in the Lokpal bill that strengthen the agency's autonomy by enhancing the proposed Lokpal's role in key appointments like those of director, head of prosecution and lawyers who represent CBI. He also mentioned in the meeting that the Lokpal should be given a significant say in appointing the director of the prosecution wing instead of the process being controlled by the law ministry as is currently the procedure, the persistent criticism about CBI's investigations being throttled by political directives could be addressed as well. He opposed making the prosecution or the anti-corruption wings subservient to the Lokpal. The select committee had in its earlier sittings examined senior law officials who agreed with the members that the prescription for lokayuktas under Article 253 that refers to fulfilment of international obligations – in this case the UN convention against corruption – might not be feasible. Recourse to international treaties to frame a law that impact the federal structure is not within the ambit of the law. The Select committee referred the Bill for Public Suggestions in July 2012. In reply hundreds of responses were received to the Rajya Sabha. The committee took a view and shortlisted certain recommendations and took Oral Evidence in physical presence of the Members. Committee considered some of the most valid suggestions being done by the Members. Mr. Deepak Tongli of Hyderabad had come with a proposal of setting up the lower most unit to keep regular check on Anti Corruption in petty cases at District Level. In addition few other members also shared their views in this regard. Mr. Tongli, aged 26 happened to be the youngest person to appear before the Parliamentary committee for Oral Evidence at Rajya Sabha.

=== Monsoon session, 2012 ===
The monsoon session of parliament was to be held in August 2012. Hence, a bill that is pending before the upper house whether or not it was passed by the Lok Sabha, does not lapse on its dissolution. Hence, the bill is still alive in its present form. The bill was not expected to be tabled in the Rajya Sabha before the first day of the last week of the session.

== See also ==
- Indian Penal Code
- Prevention of Corruption Act, 1988
- Prevention of Money Laundering Act, 2002
- Lokpal
- Lokayukta
- Citizen's Charter and Grievance Redressal Bill, 2011
- Jan Lokpal Bill
- List of acts of the Parliament of India
