= Bihar Lokayukta =

Anti-corruption Ombudsman for the state of Bihar

Agency overview
- Formed: 2011

Jurisdictional structure
- Federal agency: India
- Operations jurisdiction: India
- General nature: Federal law enforcement

Operational structure
- Headquarters: Lokyukta, Bihar, 4, Kautilya Marg, Bailey Road, Patna-800001, Bihar. Ph : 0612-2215236, Fax : 0612-2204844 E-mail : lokayukta-bih@nic.in.
- Agency executive: Hon'ble Mr. Kirti Chandra Saha.

The Bihar Lokayukta is the parliamentary ombudsman for the state of Bihar, India). It is a high level statutory functionary, created to address grievances of the public against ministers, legislators, administration and public servants in issues related to misuse of power, mal-administration and corruption. It was first formed under the Bihar Lokayukta and Upa-Lokayukta Act, and approved by the president of India on 2011. The Lokpal and Lokayukta's Act, 2013, that had been adopted by the Indian Parliament and became law on 16 January 2014, required each state in India to appoint its Lokayukta within a year. Under the 2013 law, a bench of Lokayukta should consist of judicial and non-judicial members. An Upa-Lokayukta is a deputy to the Lokayukta and assists with her or his work and acts as the in-charge Lokayukta in case the position falls vacant before time.

A Lokayukta of the state is appointed to office by the state Governor after consulting the committee consisting of State Chief Minister, Speaker of Legislative Assembly, Leader of Opposition, Chairman of Legislative Council and Leader of Opposition of Legislative Council and cannot be removed from office except for reasons specified in the Act and will serve the period of five years.

== History and administration ==
Bihar Lokayukta and Upa Lokayuka Act was passed on 22 December 2011. To prevent misuse of the institution the Act was amended in the year 2021. The office of Bihar Lokayukta is situated in 4, Kautilya Marg, Bailey Road, Patna-800001, Bihar.

== Oath or affirmation ==
"I, <name>, having been appointed Lokayukta (or Upa-Lokayukta) do swear in the name of God (or solemnly affirm) that I will bear faith and allegiance to the Constitution of India as by law established and I will duly and faithfully and to the best of my ability, knowledge and judgment perform the duties of my office without fear or favour, affection or ill-will."

— First Schedule, Bihar Lokayukta and Upa-Lokayuktas Act, 1986

== Powers ==
As per the Bihar Lokayukta's Act, it empowers the Lokayukta to file a case in a special court of complaint received by it and forward the report with its findings and recommendation for disciplinary action to the competent authority against the complainant. Bihar Lokayukta has independent powers to investigate and prosecute any government official or public servants of all grades, who are covered by the act and against whom the complaint is received for abusing his authority for self interest or causes hurt to anyone or any action done intentionally or following corrupt practices negatively impacting the state or individual. Once a complaint is received on allegations of corruption, wrong use of authority and misdeeds by any of the public functionaries who may include the Chief Minister, Ministers under him and members of Legislature Assembly, Lokayukta has the power to recommend enquiry to necessary authorities and prosecute, if proven.

In year 2021, to avoid the wastage of the institution time and its misuse and penalising the people for filing wrong cases, an amendment had been introduced in the Bihar Lokayukta and Upa-Lokayukta's Act.

== Appointment and tenure ==
Following are the details and tenure of Bihar Lokayuktas.

| Index | Name | Holding charge from | Holding charge to | |
|---|---|---|---|---|
| 1 | Hon’ble Sri Shridhar Vasudeva Sohoni, I.C.S. (Retd.) | 28 May 1973 | 27 May 1978 | |
| 2 | Justice(Retd), Hon’ble Mr. Shyam Nandan Prasad Singh | 8 June 1978 | 7 June 1983 | |
| 3 | Justice(Retd), Hon’ble Mr. Justice Syed Sarwar Ali | 7 February 1991 | 6 February 1996 | |
| 4 | Justice(Retd), Hon’ble Mr. Narbadeshwar Pandey | 8 June 2001 | 7 June 2006 | |
| 5 | Justice(Retd), Hon’ble Mr. Ram Nandan Prasad | 25 August 2006 | 24 August 2011 | |
| 6 | Justice(Retd), Hon’ble Mr. C. M. Prasad | 25 August 2011 | 24 August 2016 | |
| 7 | Justice(Retd), Hon’ble Mr. Mihir Kumar Jha | 18 May 2016 | 17 May 2021 | |
| 8 | Hon’ble Mr. Kirti Chandra Saha, I.A.S. (Retd.) | 18 May 2016 | 17 May 2021 | 9 |

Hon'ble justice sanjay kumar singh

| 10 july 2024 | 9 july 2029

== Notable cases ==
In August 2021, in a case relating to alleged serious irregularities by some BR Ambedkar University officials in appointments and financial lapses in the University, the Bihar High Court has asked the petitioner to approach the Bihar Lokayukta.

The Lokayukta of Bihar in one of its observations highlighted the financial mis-management issues in Purnea University.

== See also ==
The Lokpal and Lokayuktas Act, 2013

West Bengal Lokayukta

Delhi Lokayukta

Karnataka Lokayukta

Maharashtra Lokayukta

Uttar Pradesh Lokayukta
