= Solar Mamas =

Solar Mamas is the affectionate name given to women from different countries who have had hands-on training as technicians on the solar programme at the Barefoot College based in India. These women, with little or no formal education or literacy, usually between 35 and 50 years old, with no young children, and coming from often impoverished rural areas, go on to assemble, install, repair and maintain solar panels and equipment in their previously non-electrified villages. The women gain a sustainable income by doing this and have a new role in their communities beyond that of wife and mother, having given them the benefits of a safe, sustainable source of lighting for work, education and family life.

== Background ==
The Barefoot College was established in India in 1997 by Bunker Roy and has as one of its goals to educate illiterate women. By the start of 2025, the college's Solar programme had trained 3,500 rural women from 93 countries, so leading to 2.5 million more people having access to solar powered lighting than before.

The women on the solar programme, who have not travelled or been away from their homes very much if at all before, attend six-month training courses where they learn how to build solar electrification systems, such as LED lamps, charge controllers, home lighting systems and solar lanterns. The programme links up with many different business partnerships so that the necessary hardware can be shipped to their villages for the women to set up on their return.

As the women are unused to being in classrooms and yet find themselves in multi lingual, multi-cultural learning groups, the courses use teaching methods such as colour, pictures, gestures, practical experience and sign language to demystify technology and convey the skills required.

== Geographical spread ==
There are now solar mamas in many countries. In Zanzibar, for example, the Barefoot College has trained 65 women in solar engineering since 2015. They have in turn connected some 1,800 houses in nearly 30 villages to power. There are solar mamas in Malawi, Botswana, Kenya and Tanzania, and Senegal. In Jordan, a film has been made about a Bedouin solar mama called Rafea. Women from the Pacific are also becoming solar mamas. There are solar mamas in Nepal. There are now training centres too across India, Zanzibar, Burkina Faso, Liberia, Guatemala, Fiji and Senegal so that some of the women have less far to travel to receive the training.

Solar mamas are now included in case studies, articles and learning projects. They are also the subject of research. For example, researchers at Chalmers University of Technology in Sweden, have studied their work. The solar programme, they say, addresses “the way patriarchal norms undermine women in their capacities as knowledgeable and competent individuals” and “breaks down stigmas and social barriers by showing that people without formal education can have the capacity to become experts and community leaders.”
