= Rafea: Solar Mama =

- Directed by: Jehane Noujaim; Mona Eldaief
- Produced by: Mette Heide
- Cinematography: Mona Eldaief
- Edited by: Jean Tsien; Jenny Golden
- Music by: Jonas Colstrup
- Production companies: Steps International; Noujaim Films; Stories of Change; The Skoll Foundation; Plus Pictures; Sundance Institute; ITVS
- Distributed by: PBS
- Release dates: September 10, 2012 (TIFF); November 5, 2012 (United States)
- Running time: 75 minutes
- Country: United States
- Languages: English; Arabic

Rafea: Solar Mama is a 2012 American documentary film, directed by Jehane Noujaim and Mona Eldaief. It follows Rafea, an illiterate Jordanian Bedouin as she follows her aspirations of lighting up her village by harnessing the power of solar energy by enrolling in the Barefoot College solar program in India.

The film had its world premiere at the Toronto International Film Festival on September 10, 2012. It was released on November 5, 2012, by PBS, as part of the Why Poverty? project.

== Synopsis ==
The documentary depicts the trials and tribulations faced by Rafea, an illiterate Jordanian Bedouin as she follows her aspirations of lighting up her village by harnessing the power of solar energy by enrolling in the Barefoot College solar program in India and so becoming one of the women affectionately known as Solar Mamas. The story takes the viewer through Rafea's and her neighbour's physical and emotional journey before she triumphs.

Following the release of the film, Eldaief stated Rafea and her aunt installed 80 solar panels in one week and Rafea's determination remains unshaken in spite of personal and financial burdens.

== Release ==
The film had its world premiere at the Toronto International Film Festival on September 10, 2012. It was released on November 5, 2012, by PBS. The film went onto screen at DOC NYC on November 12, 2012, where the film won the Special Jury Prize and Audience Award, The International Documentary Film Festival Amsterdam on November 19, 2012, where the film won the Oxfam Novib audience award.
