= Tilonia =

Village in Ajmer, Rajasthan, India

- village
- Location in Rajasthan, India Tilonia (India)
- Coordinates: 26°39′N 74°57′E
- Country: India
- State: Rajasthan
- District: Ajmer
- Founder: Bunker Roy

Population
  - Total: 7,500 approx

Languages
  - Official: Hindi
- Time zone: UTC+5:30 (IST)
- ISO 3166 code: RJ-IN

Tilonia is a village in Ajmer district in Rajasthan, India. It is home of the NGO, Barefoot College, founded by renowned social worker Bunker Roy. Tilonia is also home of eShala.org, Online educational portal co-founded by Kartar Jat. This village has become a model for all remote villages for education, economic and social development. Tilonia is also known as education hub with its meritorious students in Navoday Vidyalaya and village school. Main occupation is farming but nowadays people are working in Indian Army, NTPC, BSNL, Indian Railway, Police and various other State and Central Government jobs from Group-D to Sr. Manager levels.

== Education ==
In Tilonia village, there are three day schools:

- Government Senior Secondary school - govt of Rajasthan
- Shiksha Niketan School - Barefoot college
- Shivam Public School
- Bal Sanskar School

== Industry ==
In Tilonia village, there are following industries:

- Shree Ganesh Industries
- eShala.org

== Location and Transportation ==
By road

- Kishangarh - 11 km
- Ajmer - 35 km
- Jaipur - 107 km

By rail

- Tilonia is situated between Jaipur-Ajmer rail line and Tilonia railway station is the nearest station.

By air

- Kishangarh airport is nearest airport at a distance of 11 km
- Jaipur airport- 115 km
