= Barefoot College =

- Tilonia, Rajasthan; India

Information
- Type: Public
- Established: 1972
- Founder: Bunker Roy
- Campus: Tilonia
- Website: www.barefootcollegetilonia.org

Barefoot College, previously known as the Social Work and Research Centre ("SWRC") is a voluntary organisation working in rural development by advancing drinking water and solar electrification initiatives, women’s empowerment, skill development, education, and healthcare. It was founded by Bunker Roy in 1972 and is registered under Friends of Tilonia Inc.

The "Villagers' Barefoot College" in the village of Tilonia gives lessons in reading, writing and accounting to adults and children especially the "drop-outs, cop-outs and wash-outs." Girls heavily outnumber boys in the night schools. In 2008 there were approximately 3,000 children attending 150 night schools.

In the profile acknowledging Roy as one of Time 100 most influential people of 2010 for his work with the Barefoot College, Greg Mortenson wrote that the grass-roots social entrepreneurship has trained more than 3 million people for jobs in the modern world, "in buildings so rudimentary they have dirt floors and no chairs" so that poor students feel comfortable.

== History ==
Bunker Roy is the founder of what is now called Barefoot College. After conducting a survey of water supplies in 100 drought prone areas, Roy established the Social Work and Research Centre in 1972. Its mission soon changed from a focus on water and irrigation to empowerment and sustainability. The programs focused on siting water pumps near villages and training the local population to maintain them without dependence on outside mechanics, providing training as paramedics for local medical treatment, and on solar power to decrease dependence and time spent on kerosene lighting. Roy has been named one of the 50 environmentalists who could save the planet by the Guardian and one of the 100 most influential people in the world by TIME magazine.

Night Schools were begun that allowed students who worked to support their families during the day to still receive training. The organisation has utilised a system of training the trainers to bring skills training to villages.

In 1997, Kamala Devi became first female solar engineer trained by the college's programs. She continued to work with the college. In 2012, she became the head of the solar unit at Kadampura. Since 2015, over 60 women from Zanzibar, as well as women from Malawi and Somaliland and other countries, all trained at Barefoot College and part of a larger group called Solar Mamas have assembled, installed, repaired and maintained solar power in their villages.

In March 2023, New York Times columnist Nicholas Kristof profiled the organization in his opinion column.

== Methodology ==
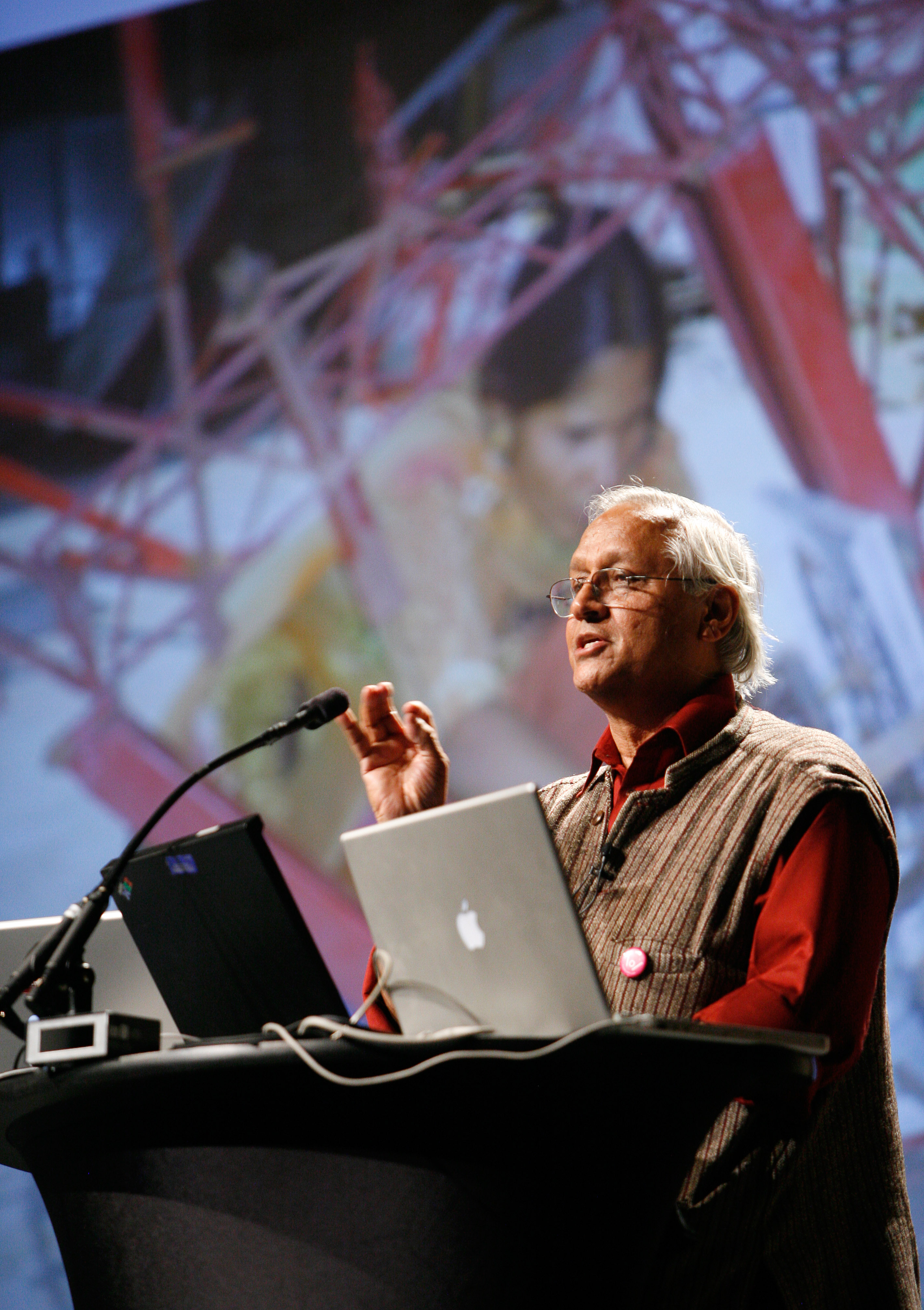
Barefoot College founder Bunker Roy speaking about the programs in 2008

The programs are influenced by the Gandhian philosophy of each village being self-reliant. The policy of the Barefoot College is to take students, primarily women, from the poorest of villages and teach them skills such as installing, building and repairing solar lamps and waterpumps without requiring them to read or write. In extreme cases, there are students without verbal fluency in the languages of their teachers.

The participating villages create a Village Energy and Environment Committee which determines the rates the villagers will pay for the solar panels and identifies which of the poorest residents of the town will go to the college for training. The students receive 6-month training program learning about solar panels and storage batteries before returning home where they maintain and repair the systems.

The college does not give out any degrees or certificates. V. Krishna has described the approach as "de-mystifying high technology" to rural villages to show that with the right training, "the uneducated and semi-literate can operate and manage" items like solar panels and water pumps.

Rajasthan's traditional art of puppetry has been utilised by the college to "spread information on health, education and human rights".

== Campus ==
The buildings used for the school have dirt floors and no chairs so that "poor students feel comfortable".

The campus sits on 8 acres, has rainwater harvesting design and was built by the students.

== Cross-cultural collaboration ==
In 2012, the Barefoot College became the first NGO partner with UNESCO's Global Partnership for Girls' and Women's Education. A UNDP funded program of India's Ministry of External Affairs brings women from villages in rural Africa (which do not have electricity) to the school for training, after which they return with new skills to install solar electricity in their villages. The college entered into an agreement in 2012 to expand the programs for students from Fiji.

The documentary film Solar Mamas, funded by the Skoll Foundation and the Sundance Institute, follows a Jordanian woman as she joins with other women from around the world to participate in the solar engineering training at Barefoot College.

An exhibition of photographs taken by the students of the Barefoot College was presented at the School of Oriental and African Studies in London.

== Awards and achievements ==
- In 1998, it was awarded the Indira Gandhi Paryavaran Puraskar (Indira Gandhi Environment Award), by the Ministry of Environment and Forests, Government of India.
- In 2003, the Barefoot College won an Ashden Award for its work bringing solar power to rural villages.
- In 2013 it was declared that Bunker Roy would receive a 'Clinton Global Citizen Award', along with young activist Malala Yousufzai.

=== Returned award ===
- The creators of the campus near Tilonia received the Aga Khan Award for Architecture. Originally the award was attributed to "an illiterate farmer", but later the award was corrected and redesignated to read "A young architect, Neehar Raina, prepared the architectural layout and an illiterate farmer from Tilonia, along with 12 other Barefoot Architects, constructed the buildings." when the presenters became aware of the involvement of professional architect Neehar Raina. Because of the inclusion of Raina, Roy did not accept the award on behalf of the school and returned it.

== Notable participants ==
- Nauroti Devi, former Sarpanch of Harmada Gram Panchayat in Rajasthan.

== See also ==
- Paulo Freire
- Szekely, E.; Mason, M. (2018). "Complexity theory, the capability approach, and the sustainability of development initiatives in education". Journal of Education Policy. 34 (5): 669–685. doi:10.1080/02680939.2018.1465999.
- The Solar Night Schools Programme, The Barefoot College ∗ India
- Szekely, E.; Mason, M. (2016). Global Agendas Versus Local Needs in Educational Development: The Barefoot College's Solar Night Schools Program in India. In: Robertson M., Tsang P. (eds) Everyday Knowledge, Education and Sustainable Futures. Education in the Asia-Pacific Region: Issues, Concerns and Prospects. Vol. 30. Springer. doi:10.1007/978-981-10-0216-8_11.
