= Grievance redressal =

Governance process

Grievance Redressal is a management- and governance-related process used commonly in India. While the term "Grievance Redressal" primarily covers the receipt and processing of complaints from citizens and consumers, a wider definition includes actions taken on any issue raised by them to avail services more effectively.

== Overview ==
GRS is mandated in Government agencies and departments that are directly involved with serving citizens and organizations. Usually a Public Relations Officer (PRO) is designated with the role of receiving complaints and initiating corrective action, but this mechanism often fails on account of lack of authority vested in the PRO over officers of various capacities. The Government of India has made effort to systematize the nature of grievance redressal through legislation, being driven by civil society agitations under the leadership of Anna Hazare and Arvind Kejriwal for enactment of the Jan Lokpal Bill into law.

Private businesses and Non-Profits engaged in service delivery, such as hotels, restaurants, colleges, etc. often tend to set up their own mechanisms, such as Feedback forms and Contact Us pages. Such means to get direct feedback enables businesses to take corrective action in time. Governments also often accept the responsibility of Consumer protection from private organizations through Legislation as well as setting up Consumer Courts and Organizations for Dispute Resolution. Such consumer courts pursue quick action for redress, while maintaining affordability and ease to the consumer.

== Coverage ==
Grievance Redressal typically covers the following types of complaints:

- Service Unavailability
- Non-Delivery against Commitment
- Excessive Delays
- Injustice concerns (such as over race, caste, sex)
- Staff Misbehaviour
- Malpractice

Wider definition of grievance redressal covers:

- Malfunctions under Warranty coverage
- Product Support issues
- Citizen Vigilance reports
- Employee Disputes

== Process ==
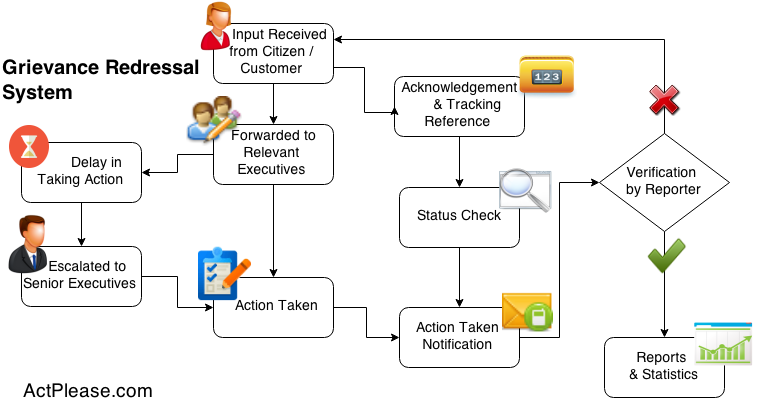
Workflow for Grievance Redressal as handled by sites such as ActPlease.com

Organizations define their own process flows for grievance redressal. These are rarely made known to the public in case of private businesses; governments and non-profits usually share voluntarily or by mandate the hierarchy of officers responsible for taking corrective action. Some organizations maintain a custom-developed ticketing software, while others count on SaaS Portals such as ActPlease.com. Feedback Portals such as TripAdvisor and Yelp are driven by consumers, and organizations / businesses have the option to join and participate. Depending on the desire to correct as well as level of transparency of the organization, grievance redressal flow can include the following steps:

=== Input acceptance ===
Customers convey their grievance to the organization through feedback forms, letters, registered communications, emails, etc. These inputs may be submitted by mail, over the Internet, or in person.

==== Anonymity ====
Customers are often reluctant to report grievances that target individual executives of the organization, especially those who may influence their future interactions or have the potential to take vengeance. Under such conditions, the organization needs to assure the customer that her identity will be hidden from executives, and preferably from everyone. This, however, opens the potential problem of deceitful negative inputs purposefully targeted against specific executives, as the people reporting are kept anonymous.

Feedback forms on website are prone to spam submissions. There are cases when employees themselves submit feedback - positive for their professional gain, and negative if targeting colleagues. Some service centers make employees sign blank feedback forms to create positive statistics. Such situations can be prevented by seeking verification of identity of customers. This is especially possible on online setups, such as ActPlease.com, which uses SMS to verify the authenticity of the mobile number of reporter. Basic tools such as Captcha can prevent automatic spammers. Mass submission of false feedback becomes less likely and easy to detect in case of paper-based submission.

=== Acknowledgement & Status Tracking ===
Customers tend to develop much greater confidence in the grievance and feedback mechanism if they are given a formal acknowledgement. The acknowledgement could be by SMS and Email, as used by ActPlease.com, or simply by publicly posting their message on the appropriate forum, such as TripAdvisor. Ticketing Systems such as osTicket and Fresh Desk, as well as SaaS systems such as ActPlease respond with acknowledgements with unique tracking numbers. These may be used by customers to check the status of action taken on their complaint.

=== Forwarding ===
Paper-based feedback as well as standard feedback forms on websites usually forward inputs to a single officer or email address. This naturally causes scope for delay or failure to reach the right persons. However, smarter ticketing systems sort grievances based on their classification, and then redirect each to their relevant executive(s) instantly.

==== Escalation ====
Smart Grievance Portals such as ActPlease expect organizations to configure typical action time for each type of complaint, as well as set up the hierarchy for escalation. When an executive fails to take corrective action in time, the matter is promoted to the officer next in line in seniority.

=== Action ===
Computerized and web-based systems have an advantage over paper-based systems as they can alert the reporter immediately upon completion of action, as marked by the executive in charge.

==== Verification ====
Customer may certify, if applicable and asked, whether the corrective action taken on their grievance satisfies them or is not substantial enough. Should it not be, the complaint may be marked as pending again, or be forwarded to a more senior officer in escalated form.

== Measurements ==
The effectiveness of implementation of a grievance redressal mechanism can be calculated with the following parameters:

- Count of cases received
- Nature of cases received
- Acceptance of anonymous feedback
- Ratio of false inputs
- Time taken for corrective action
- Escalations required
- Confirmations & rejections after completion
- Repeat nature of grievances

== Challenges ==
Traditional Grievance Redressal mechanisms tend to fail, or are very ineffective, on account of some of these causes:

- Unavailability or Difficulty to access means to report grievances, at times done so purposefully, or due to lack of priority
- Lack of authority of PRO over relevant departments and executives in Government organizations
- Disconnect of senior decision-maker executives with end customers
- Non-motivation of front-end managers to forward negative feedback to higher-ups
- Fear of citizens / consumers to report malpractice about officers with substantial authority
- Inability of smaller private organizations to set up computerized mechanisms
- Inaccuracy and spamming of feedback forms, driving false impressions
- Delayed feedback acceptance, as feedback is taken after service has been provided, while corrective action may be taken typically during the delivery of service

== Grievance Redressal Options available to Organizations ==
=== Feedback Forms ===
These are most popular and usually used by consumer service businesses, such as hotels and restaurants. They are less likely to be effective, as there is reduced assurance of their reaching the decision-making authorities. These also usually do not give any formal confirmation or tracking number to the complainant. Possibility of fake submissions also remains. Customers therefore have less confidence on such forms. Confidence can be strengthened if a central call center sends an acknowledgement of receipt of such feedback. Another possible reinforcement may be done by taking digitized input, which can be processed using scantron machines.

=== Contact Us Links ===
Websites of organizations generally carry the Contact Us page, which lists the email and phone numbers to use to submit any concerns. Many websites also provide a form to fill that automatically gets sent by email, with confirmation to the reporter.

=== Customer-driven Feedback Websites ===
Websites such as Yelp and TripAdvisor allow customers to post grievances and recommendations about organizations from personal experience. Designated representatives of these organizations have the option to respond to such communications, though these responses are often just standard text. The feedback also tends to be subjective and unlikely to be auto-sorted and forwarded for action.

=== Organization-oriented Portals ===
Organizations can subscribe to grievance redressal portals such as ActPlease.com to invite their customers to report their grievances and request action. As such portals are configured by the organizations themselves, they can ensure that complaints are directed properly. ActPlease, being a third party site, handles anonymity of the reporter from the organization when necessary, while ensuring the genuine nature of the person, through SMS verification. Such SaaS Portals are easy to use and easily affordable for all organizations including SMEs, while empowering them with the latest tools such as Mobile application testing and Customized Websites.

=== Custom-developed Ticketing Systems ===
Large organizations involved in customer service set up their own ticketing systems with similar features as the SaaS portals, but with greater customization in the processing of grievances. Examples of such organizations are Bharat Sanchar Nigam Limited and Torrent Power. Large-scale ERP software, such as SAP and Genie also provide facility for setting up ticketed grievance redressal and customer support systems.
