= Bunker Roy =

Indian social activist and educator (1945–2026)

Sanjit Bunker Roy
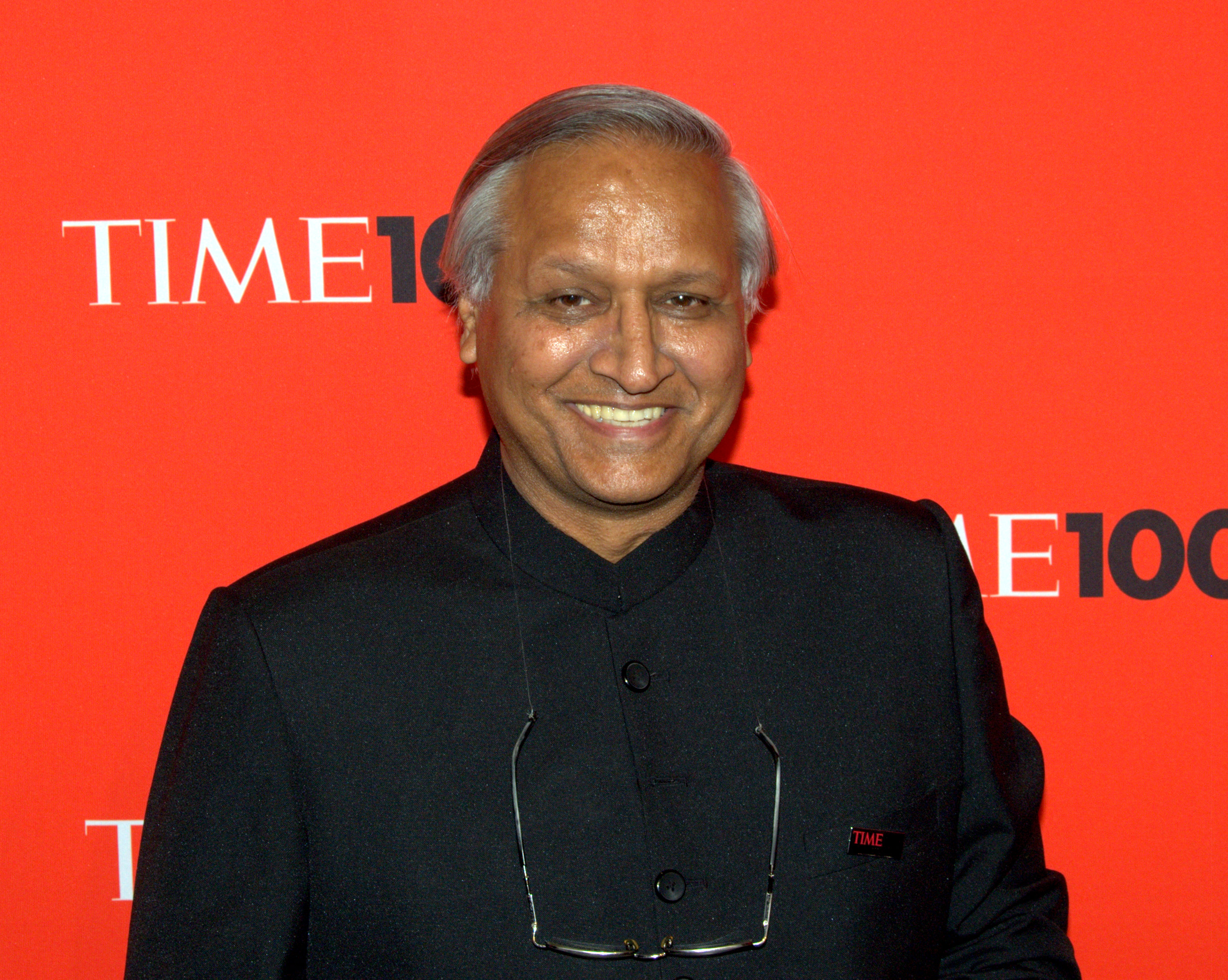
- Roy at the Time 100 event in 2010
- Born: Sanjit Roy; 30 June 1945; Burnpur, Bengal Presidency, British India
- Died: 10 November 2026 (aged 81); Tilonia, Rajasthan, India
- Education: St. Stephen's College, Delhi
- Occupations: Social activist and founder of Barefoot College
- Spouse: Aruna Roy (m. 1970)

Sanjit "Bunker" Roy (30 June 1945 – 10 November 2026) was an Indian social activist and educator who founded the Barefoot College. He was selected as one of Time 100's 100 most influential personalities in 2010 for his work in educating illiterate and semi-literate rural Indians. Roy was awarded the Padma Shri by Giani Zail Singh in 1986.

== Background ==
Sanjit Roy attended the all-boys' The Doon School, where he was a contemporary of Rajiv Gandhi, and then went to St. Stephen's College, Delhi from 1962 to 1967.

He was the Indian national squash champion in 1965 and also represented India in three world squash championships.

Roy was married to ex-IAS Aruna Roy in 1970. He died in Tilonia on 10 November 2026, at the age of 81.

== Barefoot College ==
Roy was the founder of what is now called Barefoot College. After conducting a survey of water supplies in 100 drought-prone areas, Roy established the Social Work and Research Centre in 1972. Its mission soon changed from a focus on water and irrigation to empowerment and sustainability. The programs focused on siting water pumps near villages and training the local population to maintain them without dependence on outside mechanics, providing training as paramedics for local medical treatment, and on solar power to decrease dependence and time spent on kerosene lighting.

He was recognised in 2010 in Time for the programs of the college which have trained more than 3 million people in skills including solar engineers such as the Solar Mamas, teachers, midwives, weavers, architects, and doctors.

== Other work ==
Roy was appointed by Rajiv Gandhi to the government's Planning Commission. He recommended that legislation be created that would apply a "code of conduct" for non-governmental organizations. He also proposed that a national council be created that would recommend "legitimate" organizations to the government and monitor their activities. Both of these recommendations were "fiercely" opposed as mechanisms that could be used to promote patronage of favored groups and quell organizations that were not supportive of a particular government or party.

In 1983, he was the plaintiff in Roy v State of Rajasthan in which the Supreme Court struck down an emergency policy which had allowed women famine relief workers to be paid less than male workers.

He spoke at the TED conference, about how the Barefoot College "helps rural communities becomes self-sufficient."

== Awards and recognition ==
- 1985: "Jamnalal Bajaj Award" for Application of Science and Technology for Rural Development.
- 2003: Won The 2003 "St Andrews Prize for the Environment"
- 2003: One of 20 people to be selected as "Social Entrepreneurs of the Year" by Schwab Foundation for Social Entrepreneurship
- 2009: Received a "Robert Hill Award" for his contribution to promotion of photo-voltaics (solar energy)
