= Citizen's Charter and Grievance Redressal Bill, 2011 =

Proposed law in India

Citizens Charter Bill
- Long title: The Right of Citizens for Time Bound Delivery of Goods and Services and Redressal of their Grievances Bill, 2011
- Territorial extent: Indian constitute

Summary
- Status Lapsed

The Citizen's Charter and Grievance Redressal Bill 2011 also known as The Right of Citizens for Time Bound Delivery of Goods and Services and Redressal of their Grievances Bill, 2011 or Citizens Charter Bill was proposed by Indian central legislation. It was tabled by V. Narayanasamy, Minister of State for Personnel, Public Grievances and Pensions, in Lok Sabha in December 2011. The bill lapsed due to dissolution of the 15th Lok Sabha.

== Features ==
The Bill seeks to confer on every citizen the right to time-bound delivery of specified goods and services and to provide a mechanism for Grievance Redressal. The Bill makes it mandatory for every public authority to publish a Citizen's Charter within six months of the commencement of the Act, failing which the official concerned would face action, including a fine of up to Rs. 50,000 from his salary and disciplinary proceedings.

The bill came after Anna Hazare asked for its provisions to be included in the Jan Lokpal Bill.

== Legislation status ==
Stage	Date
Current Status:	Lapsed
Ministry:	Personnel, Public Grievances and Pensions
Introduction	20 Dec 2011
Com. Ref.	13 Jan 2012
Com. Rep.	By 15 Mar 2012
Lok Sabha	Introduced
Rajya Sabha	

== See also ==
- Corruption in India#Anti-corruption laws in India
- Jan Lokpal Bill
