= Mazdoor Kisan Shakti Sangathan =

Indian political organisation

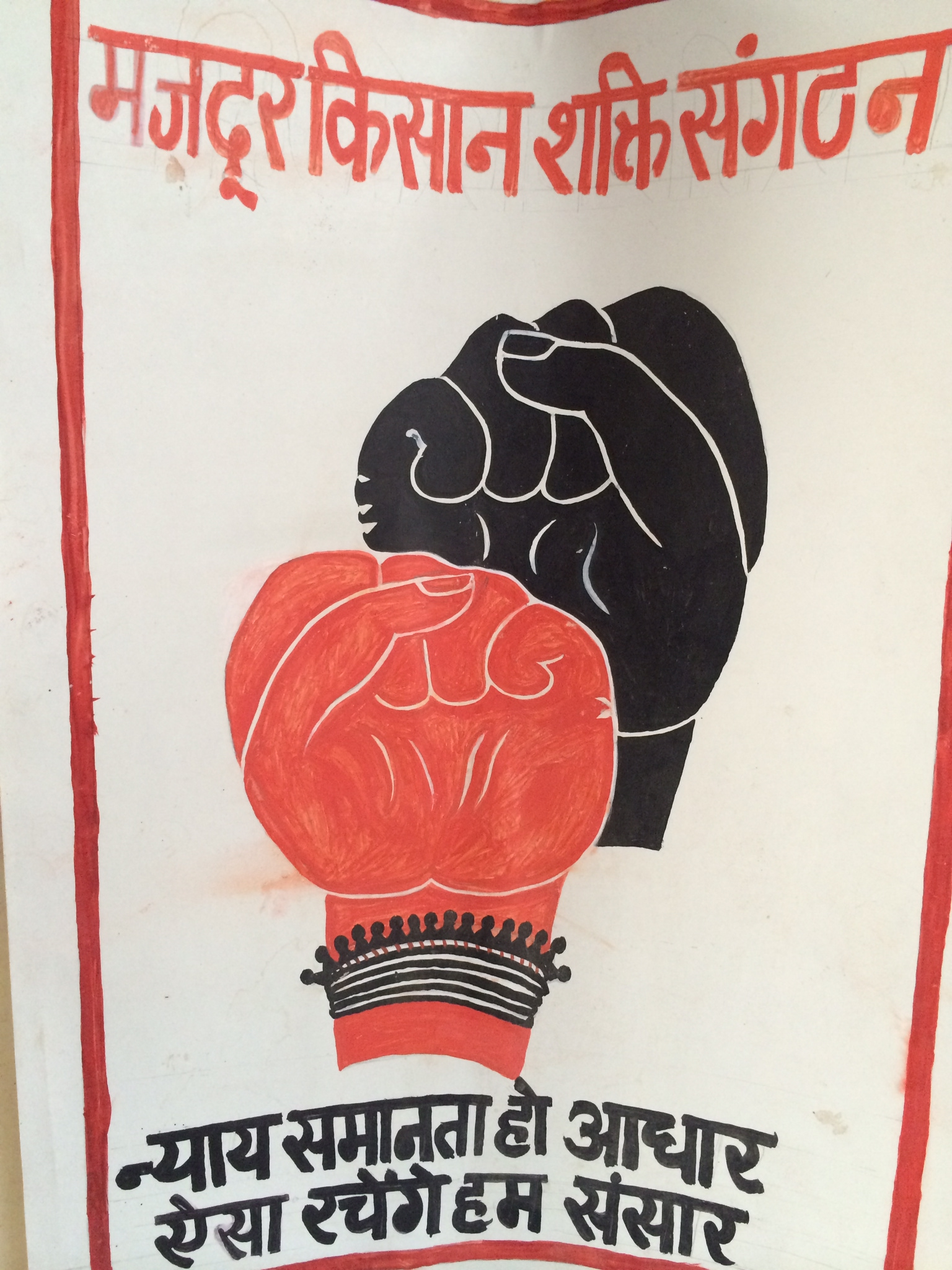
- Abbreviation: MKSS
- Formation: 1 May 1990
- Type: Not for profit
- Legal status: Active
- Headquarters: Rajasthan, India
- Region served: India
- Official language: English and Hindi
- Leader: Aruna Roy; Nikhil Dey; Shankar Singh and others
- Website: Official Website

The Mazdoor Kisan Shakti Sangathan (Association for the Empowerment of Labourers and Farmers) is an Indian political organisation best known for its demand for the Right to Information Act (RTI) which grew out of the demand for minimum wages for workers.

== History ==
On April 6, 1996, the MKSS announced a strike in the city of Beawar in Ajmer, Rajasthan. After a series of public hearings exposed systemic corruption across Rajasthan, and the reneging of the promise of the Right to Information given by the then Chief Minister of Rajasthan, the Mazdoor Kisan Shakti Sangathan began a historic forty-day-long dharna (sit in protest) to demand the Right to Information. Protestors came from across rural Rajasthan to the city of Beawar. The novelty of this protest was the demand for information by the poor instead of expected basic needs like food and shelter. During the protest, a memorandum was given to the sub-divisional officer at Beawar that demanded local expenditure records.

The protest began with support from over one hundred and fifty villages. It was supported by donations of grain from these villages and individuals in Beawar. Almost forty-six thousand rupees were donated to keep the protest going. Nearby vegetable vendors donated to the protestors, providing them with food and water. Doctors offered their services. Local people joined in and walked with the rural protestors. The people of Beawar embraced the protest and began to make it their own. The protest was marked by cultural expression including song, theatre and puppetry. Local cultural groups joined in. These included a group of devotional singers (Bhajan Mandali) who would sing parodies of devotional songs in support of the demands of the protestors. Bagpipers and local poets also joined in. Local cadres of trade unions also lent their support.

As the protest gained momentum, people began to visit Beawar from across the country to see the extraordinary happenings that were taking place in this small city in Rajasthan. Journalists, lawmakers, and artists, amongst many others came to the city of Beawar. Senior journalists who visited included Nikhil Chakravartty, Kuldip Nayar, and Prabhash Joshi. Prabhash Joshi wrote a historic editorial in the Jansatta newspaper entitled "Hum Jaanenge, Hum Jiyenge" (We will know, we will live). This title became a slogan of the RTI movement in India and was modified to say "the right to know is the right to live".

=== Remembering the Fight ===
In April 2015, the Mazdoor Kisan Shakti Sangathan returned to Chang gate, the site of the 40-day long protest to commemorate entering the tenth year of remembering the protest.

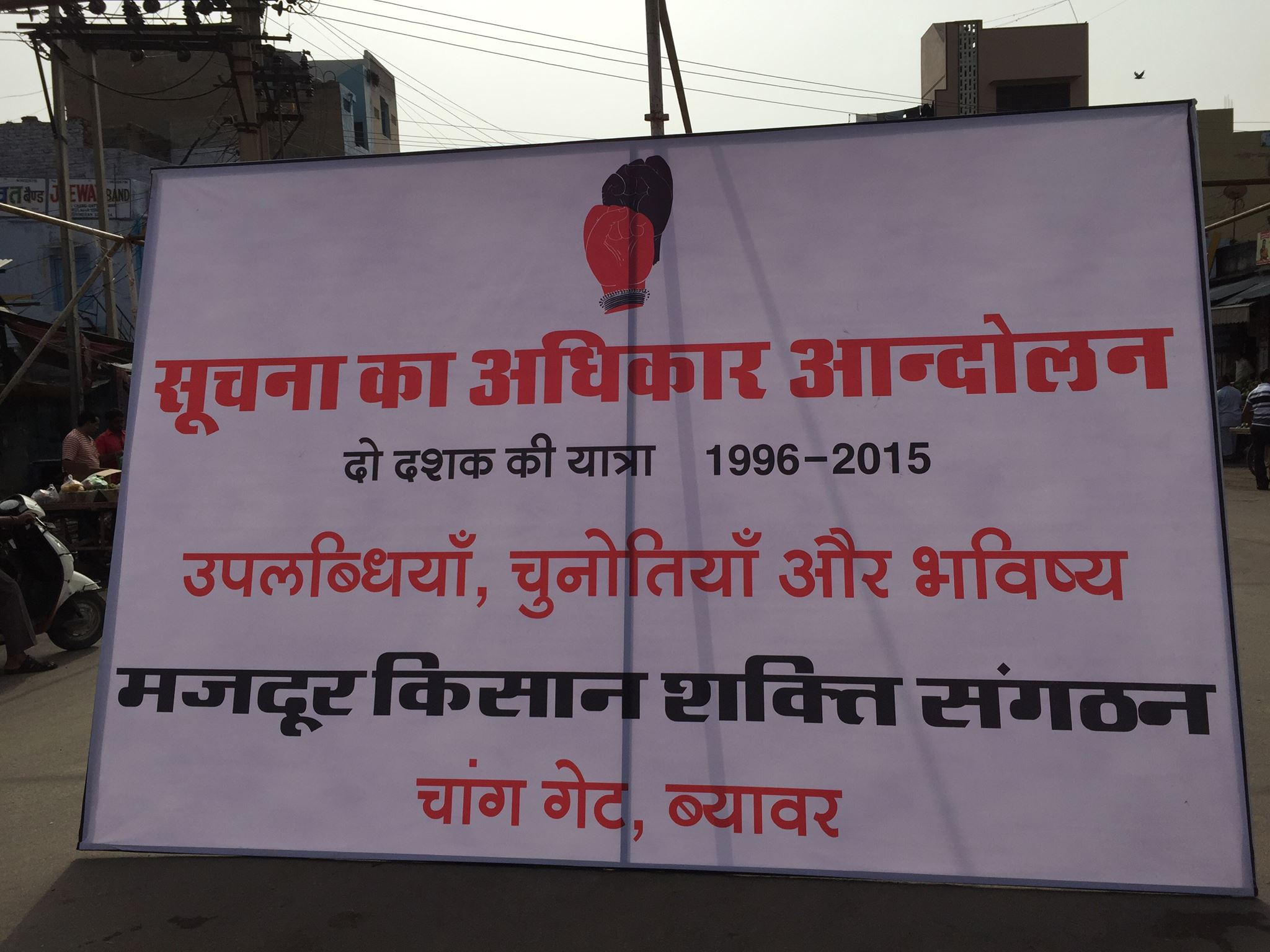
Celebration of 40-day dharna, 2015, Beawar, Rajasthan

A street exhibition entitled "Beawar ka Junoon bana desh ka kanoon" (Beawar's determination became the nation's law) with archival photos, posters and newspaper articles was set up. Old protest songs were sung as many citizens of Beawar who had been part of the protests remembered the struggle. A museum with archival material to remember the city that gave birth to the RTI movement is being planned at Bewar.

== Jan Sunwaii (Public Hearings) ==
One of the innovations of the MKSS was the method of Jan Sunwaiis or public hearings where detailed documents derived from official expenditure records were read aloud to the people of the villages who gathered. Jan Sunwaiis are organised independent of the government but government officials are invited to attend. In the form of a hearing, people are invited to give their testimonies which often reveal differences between official records and people's experiences. Before the existence of the RTI Act, it was very difficult to access official records and not many Jan Sunwaiis could be organised.
