= Debendranath Champia =

Indian politician

MLA
- Constituency: Majhgaon

Personal details
- Born: 24 February 1942 (age 84) West Singhbhum, Jharkhand, India
- Party: INC

Debendranath Champia (born 24 February 1942), sometimes spelled as Devendra Nath Champia, is an Indian politician and a former member of the Bihar constituency assembly. He represented the Majhgaon (Vidhan Sabha constituency) of Jharkhand, and he is a member of the Indian National Congress (INC) political party.
