= Debendranath Bandyopadhyay =

Indian politician (born 1931)

Member of Parliament (Rajya Sabha) for West Bengal
- In office 19 August 2011 – 2017

Personal details
- Born: 1 October 1931 (age 94) Dacca, Bengal Presidency, British India
- Party: Trinamool Congress

Debendranath Bandyopadhyay (born 1 October 1931) is an Indian retired politician belonging to the Trinamool Congress. He was elected to the Rajya Sabha the Upper house of Indian parliament from West Bengal in 2011. Bandyopadhyay was an IAS officer and came into public life when he joined the Singur and Nandigram protests. He retired in 2017.
