= Whistle Blowers Protection Act, 2011 =

Act of the Parliament of India

Whistle Blowers Protection Act, 2014

Parliament of India
- Long title: An Act to establish a mechanism to receive complaints relating to disclosure on any allegation of corruption or wilful misuse of power or wilful misuse of discretion against any public servant and to inquire or cause an inquiry into such disclosure and to provide adequate safeguards against victimisation of the person making such complaint and for matters connected therewith and incidental thereto.
- Citation: Act No. 17 of 2014
- Passed by: Lok Sabha
- Passed: 27 December 2011
- Considered by: Rajya Sabha
- Enacted by: 21 February 2014
- Assented to by: President Pranab Mukherjee
- Assented to: 9 September 2014

Legislative history

Initiating chamber: Lok Sabha
- Bill title: Whistle Blowers Protection Bill, 2011
- Bill citation: Bill No. 97 of 2010
- Introduced by: Prithviraj Chavan, Minister of State for Personnel, Public Grievance and Pensions
- Introduced: 26 August 2010
- Standing Committee: 16 September 2010–9 June 2011
- Passed: 27 December 2011

Revising chamber: 21 February 2014
- Passed: 21 February 2014

Repeals
- Ministry of Personnel, Public Grievances and Pensions (Department of Personnel and Training) Resolution No. 371/12/2002-AVD-III dated the 21 April 2004 as amended vide Resolution of even number, dated the 29 April 2004

Amended by
- Repealing and Amending Act, 2015
- Status: Not yet in force

The Whistle Blowers Protection Act, 2011 (renamed as Whistle Blowers Protection Act, 2014 by the second schedule of the Repealing and Amending Act, 2015) is an Act of the Parliament of India which provides a mechanism to investigate alleged corruption and misuse of power by public servants and also protect anyone who exposes alleged wrongdoing in government bodies, projects and offices. The wrongdoing might be in the form of fraud, corruption or mismanagement. The Act also provides punishment for false or frivolous complaints.

The Act was approved by the Cabinet of India as part of a drive to eliminate corruption in the country's bureaucracy. The Bill was passed by the Lok Sabha on 27 December 2011, by the Rajya Sabha on 21 February 2014 and received the President's assent on 9 May 2014.

== Intent ==
An Act to establish a mechanism to receive complaints relating to disclosure on any allegation of corruption or wilful misuse of power or wilful misuse of discretion against any public servant and to inquire or cause an inquiry into such disclosure and to provide adequate safeguards against victimization of the person making such complaint and for matters connected therewith and incidental thereto.

== Salient Features ==
- The Act seeks to protect whistle blowers, i.e. persons making a public interest disclosure related to an act of corruption, misuse of power, or criminal offense by a public servant.
- Any public servant or any other person including a non-governmental organization may make such a disclosure to the Central or State Vigilance Commission.
- Every complaint has to include the identity of the complainant.
- The Vigilance Commission shall not disclose the identity of the complainant except to the head of the department if deemed necessary. The Act penalizes any person who has disclosed the identity of the complainant.
- The Act prescribes penalties for knowingly making false complaints.

== Background ==
There have been multiple instances of threatening, harassment and even murder of various whistle blowers. An engineer, Satyendra Dubey, was murdered in November 2003; Dubey had blown the whistle in a corruption case in the National Highways Authority of India’s Golden Quadrilateral project.

Two years later, an Indian Oil Corporation officer, Shanmughan Manjunath, was murdered for sealing a petrol pump that was selling adulterated fuel.

A Karnataka official SP Mahantesh, said to be a whistle-blower in controversial land allotments by societies was murdered in May 2012. Mahantesh was working as Deputy Director of the audit wing in the state’s Cooperative department and had reported irregularities in different societies involving some officials and political figures. A senior police officer alleged that Mayawati's government was corrupt and had embezzled large amounts of money. Shortly thereafter, he was sent to a psychiatric hospital.

The activists demanded that a law should be framed to protect the whistle blowers, to facilitate the disclosure of information and uncover corruption in government organisations.

=== Role of Supreme court ===
Situations are many where certain persons do not want to disclose the identity as well as the information/complaint passed on by them to the ACB. If the names of the persons, as well as the copy of the complaint sent by them are disclosed, that may cause embarrassment to them and sometimes threat to their lives.

— Justice K S Radhakrishnan and Justice Arjan Kumar Sikri, Supreme Court of India

In November 2003, Satyendra Dubey a whistle blower and National Highways Authority of India (NHAI) engineer was murdered after he exposed corruption in the construction of highways. As a result, the Supreme Court, in April 2004, pressed the government into issuing an office order, the Public Interest Disclosures and Protection of Informers Resolution, 2004 designating CVC as the nodal agency.

In March 2011, the Supreme Court refused to frame guidelines for protection of whistle blowers in the country, saying that it cannot make law. However, the court allowed the petitioners to approach the high court for protection of whistle blowers in a specific case.

In August 2013, a bench of Justices K S Radhakrishnan and Arjan Kumar Sikri ruled that identity of whistle blower can never be revealed to the accused facing prosecution under Prevention of Corruption Act, 1988.

== Legislative progress ==
Stage	Date
Introduction	26 August 2010
Standing Committee referral	16 September 2010
Standing Committee report	9 June 2011
Lok Sabha	Passed on 27 December 2011
Rajya Sabha	Passed on 21 February 2014

In order to receive a complain against alleged corruption and to protect the person making such a complain, the Government introduced "The Public Interest Disclosure and Protection to Persons Making the Disclosure Bill, 2010" in the Lok Sabha on 26 August 2010. The Bill was referred to the Department Related Parliamentary Standing Committee. The recommendations by the committee were considered and amendments made. In June 2011, a parliamentary panel recommended that ministers, the higher judiciary, security organisations, defence and intelligence forces and regulatory authorities be brought under the whistle blowers' protection bill to check corruption and the wilful misuse of power. The bill was passed by the Lok Sabha on 27 December 2011. The Bill came up for consideration in the Rajya Sabha on 14 August 2012 during the Monsoon Session, 2012. Though the Bill was listed on a number of days but could not be taken up for discussion in the Monsoon Session. Notices for moving motion for consideration and passing of the Bill and for moving official amendments were also given to the Rajya Sabha Secretariat during the Winter Session, 2012, Budget Session, 2013 and Monsoon Session, 2013 of Parliament, respectively, but the Bill could not be taken up. Notices for moving official amendments as well as for consideration and passing of the Bill were again sent to the Rajya Sabha during the Winter Session, 2013 of Parliament. The Bill was finally passed by the Rajya Sabha on 21 February 2014. The Bill received the President's assent on 9 May 2014. However, the Act has not yet come into force, because amendments pertaining to safeguards against certain disclosures relevant to national security could not be incorporated, as the bill was passed on the last working day of the 15th Lok Sabha. With these amendments, the Government brought in the Whistle Blowers Protection (Amendment) Bill, 2015 which the Lok Sabha passed on 13 May 2015. But the bill failed in Rajya Sabha and lapsed when the 16th Lok Sabha got dissolved in May 2019. Thereafter, the Government claimed that the Act was adequate, even without the amendments. On 10 March 2017, another amendment bill was personally introduced by an M.P., which was not passed and finally lapsed.

== Analysis of the legislation ==
According to Indian law reports, the bill has faced considerable criticism because its jurisdiction is restricted to the government sector and encompasses only those who are working for the Government of India or its agencies; it does not cover the state-government employees. However, the draft bill aimed at protecting whistle blowers is seen as a welcome move.

The lack of public debate and consultation on the bill seems to indicate the danger of it becoming another "paper tiger". Typically, ministries proposing draft legislation involve a process of public consultation to give the public an opportunity to carefully critique its provisions. In this case, such an opportunity has been denied to the public, which has not gone unnoticed.

The proposed law has neither provisions to encourage whistleblowing (financial incentives), nor deals with corporate whistle blowers; it does not extend its jurisdiction to the private sector (a strange omission, after the fraud at Satyam). The Directorate of Income Tax Intelligence and Criminal Investigation is one of the only agencies empowered for whistle blower protection.

The bill aims to balance the need to protect honest officials from harassment with protecting persons making a public-interest disclosure. It outlines sanctions for false complaints. However, it does not provide a penalty for attacking a complainant.

The Central Vigilance Commission (CVC) was designated in 2004 to receive public-interest disclosures through government resolution; there have been a few hundred complaints every year. The provisions of the bill are similar to that of the resolution. Therefore, it is unlikely that the number of complaints will differ significantly. The power of the CVC is limited to making recommendations. It cannot impose penalties, in contrast to the powers of the Karnataka and Delhi Lokayuktas.

The bill has a limited definition of disclosure, and does not define victimisation. Other countries (such as the United States, United Kingdom and Canada) define disclosure more widely and define victimisation.

It differs on many issues with the proposed Bill of the Law Commission and the Second Administrative Reform Commission’s report. These include non-admission of anonymous complaints and lack of penalties for officials who victimise whistle blowers.

If enacted, the law to protect whistle blowers will assist in detecting corruption, ensuring better information flow and paving the way for successful prosecution of corrupt individuals through clear and protected processes. However, the public in India have a low level of confidence in fighting corruption because they fear retaliation and intimidation against those who file complaints. Another worry pertains to the delay in disposing of these cases. Without public debate on the provisions of this proposed law, it is clear that people cannot measure its effectiveness when the draft bill comes into force as law.

== Central Vigilance Commission Initiative: Blow your whistle ==
The Central Vigilance Commission plans to create more awareness about corruption in India. To encourage the fight against corruption, CVC has provided on their website, a "Lodge Complaints Online" portal. The earlier publicized portal Blow your whistle is no longer functional.

== See also ==
- Attacks on RTI activists in India
- Right to Information Act, 2005
- List of acts of the Parliament of India
