= 2011 Indian anti-corruption movement =

Series of demonstrations and protests across India

- Anna Andolan
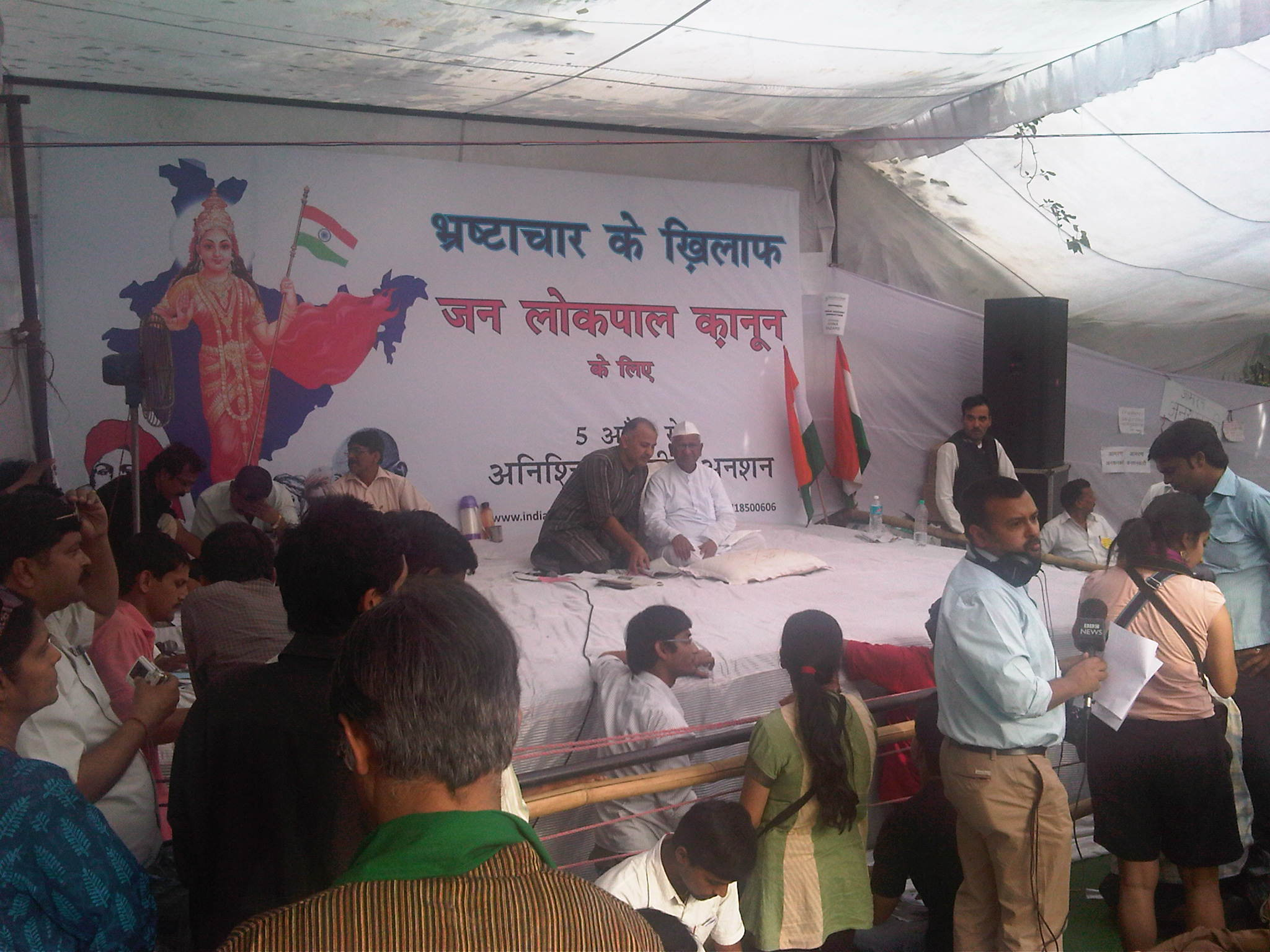
- Anna Hazare's hunger strike at the Jantar Mantar in New Delhi, on the second day of his fast
- Date: 4 April 2011 – 28 December 2011 (8 months, 3 weeks and 3 days)
- Location: India
- Caused by: Corruption in public environment: Government corruption; Police corruption; Judicial corruption; Corporate corruption; Kleptocracy; Electoral fraud; Red tape; Discretionary powers of politician; Black money
- Goals: Enactment of anti-corruption legislature, Jan Lokpal Bill for ombudsman
- Methods: Non violent protest
- Result: Resolution passed in Parliament accepting Jan Lokpal Bill on 27 August 2011, Government again withdrawn Resolution on 22 December 2011, Government Cabinet introduced The Lokpal Bill, 2011 in the parliament but failed to pass.; protests renewed in 2012 when Rajya Sabha failed to pass the Bill

The Indian anti-corruption movement, popularly known as Anna Andolan, was a series of demonstrations and protests across India that began in 2011 and was intended to establish strong legislation and enforcement against perceived endemic political corruption. The movement was named as one of the "Top 10 News Stories of 2011" by Time magazine.

The wheels of this development took a public outburst first during the rally at Jantar Mantar organised by yoga guru Ramdev on 14 November 2010 to hand over police complaint against the corruption in 2010 Commonwealth Games.

A rally was organised at the historic Ramlila Maidan, Delhi, in which a group of notable people including Arvind Kejriwal, Shanti Bhushan, Prashant Bhushan, Kiran Bedi, Ram Jethmalani, Medha Patkar, Swami Agnivesh, Col. Devinder Sehrawat, Sunita Godara, Harsh Mandar, the Archbishop of Delhi, Justice D. S. Tewatia, Devinder Sharma, PV Rajgopal and Trilok Sharma marched after holding a public meeting, in which the decision to invite social activist Anna Hazare to lead the movement was taken. Peaceful public marches against corruption were held in several cities in India. People demanded the proposed new Lokpal Bill.

The movement gained momentum from 5 April 2011, when anti-corruption activist Anna Hazare began a hunger strike at the Jantar Mantar monument in New Delhi. The movement aimed to alleviate corruption in the Indian government through the introduction of the Jan Lokpal Bill. Another aim, which was led by Ramdev, Kiran Bedi, Arvind Kejriwal and others, was the repatriation of black money from foreign banks.

Mass protesters focused on legal and political issues, including political corruption, kleptocracy, and other forms of corruption. The movement was primarily one of non-violent civil resistance and was composed of demonstrations, marches, acts of civil disobedience, hunger strikes, and rallies, and the use of social media to organize, communicate, and raise awareness. The protests were nonpartisan and most protesters were hostile to political parties' attempts to use them to strengthen their own political agenda.

== Background ==
Issues of corruption in India have become increasingly prominent in recent years. After independence in 1947, the country was subject to socialist-inspired economic policies until the 1980s. Over-regulation, protectionism and government ownership of industry led to slow economic growth, high unemployment, and widespread poverty. This system of bureaucratic control by government, which is called the License Raj, was at the core of endemic corruption.

The 1993 Vohra Report, submitted by the former Indian Union Home Secretary Narinder Nath Vohra, studied the criminalisation of politics and contains several observations made by official agencies on the criminal network that was virtually running a parallel government. It also discussed criminal gangs that enjoyed the patronage of politicians and the protection of government functionaries. According to the report, political leaders had become leaders of street gangs and rogue elements in the military. Criminals had been elected to local bodies, state assemblies, and the Parliament of India.

The 2005 Right to Information Act (RTI) helped civilians work towards tackling corruption. The Act allows Indian citizens to request information for a fixed fee of ₹ 10 (US$0.22) from a public authority, which is required to reply to the request within thirty days. Activists, some of whom have been attacked and killed, have used this law to uncover corruption cases against politicians and bureaucrats.

During the Second Manmohan Singh ministry; In the years immediately preceding the 2011 anti-corruption protests, there were examples of alleged corruption in the country; these included the Adarsh Housing Society Scam, the 2010 housing loan scam, the Radia tapes controversy, and the 2G spectrum case. In February 2011, the Supreme Court of India ordered all trial courts in the country to expedite handling of corruption cases and the President of India Pratibha Patil stated measures to ratify the United Nations Convention Against Corruption (UNCAC) and other legislative and administrative measures to improve transparency would be taken. A month later, the Supreme Court forced the resignation of Chief Vigilance Commissioner P.J. Thomas.

A worldwide, 50-city march called the Dandi March II was organised by People for Lok Satta and took place in March 2011, as did the Drive Around Delhi protest.

== March 2011 protests ==
Dandi March II organised Group of Non-Resident Indians walked 240 miles in the United States against corruption in India. Started in Martin Luther King Jr. Memorial Park, San Diego, California on 12 March 2011, and ends March 26 at Gandhi Statue, San Francisco and demanded for Lokpal Bill and return of black money, March also conducted in 45 cities in USA, 40 cities in India and 8 other countries globally supported many groups such as 5th Pillar and Youth For Better India.

== April 2011 protests ==
Anna Hazare wanted a joint committee composed of members of the government and of civil society to be formed to draft tougher anti-corruption legislation. After Manmohan Singh, Prime Minister of India rejected Hazare's demand, Hazare began a hunger strike on 5 April 2011 at the Jantar Mantar, Delhi. He said the fast would continue until the legislation was enacted. His action attracted considerable support, including some people who joined him in fasting. Prominent representatives of opposition political parties, including the Bharatiya Janata Party and the Communist Party of India (Marxist), indicated their support for Hazare and demanded government action. Hazare would not allow politicians to sit with him and those who tried to join him, such as Uma Bharti and Om Prakash Chautala, were turned away.

Protests in sympathy with Hazare spread to other Indian cities, including Bangalore, Mumbai, Chennai, and Ahmedabad. Prominent figures from Bollywood, sports and business indicated their support, and there were protests in other countries, including the US, UK, France and Germany. The government squabbled with the activists, insisting the drafting committee would be headed by a government-appointed minister and not, as the protesters had demanded to prevent the government from making the bill less powerful, a civil society member.

On 6 April, Agriculture Minister Sharad Pawar, whom Hazare had accused of being corrupt, resigned from the group of ministers that had been tasked with reviewing the draft bill. On 9 April, the government agreed to establish a joint committee; this came from a compromise that politician Pranab Mukherjee would be chairman and a non-politician activist Shanti Bhushan would be co-chairman. Bhushan, together with Hazare, Justice N. Santosh Hegde, advocate Prashant Bhushan and RTI activist Arvind Kejriwal, had originally drafted the Lokpal Bill. The first meeting of the Lokpal Bill drafting committee was held on 16 April. The government agreed to audio-record the committee's meetings and to hold public consultations before a final draft was prepared but refused Hazare's demand for the proceedings to be televised live.

== June protest ==
Earlier in April, Ramdev had announced he would launch a people's anti-corruption movement called Bharat Swabhiman Andolan. On 13 May, it was announced India had completed ratification of the UN Convention against Corruption, a process that had begun in 2010. In early June, senior Union Ministers Pranab Mukherjee, Kapil Sibal, Pawan Kumar Bansal and Subodh Kant Sahay met Ramdev to discuss his concerns. Ramdev supported Hazare's fast and led a second major protest at Ramlila Maidan, New Delhi, on 4 June to highlight the need for legislation to repatriate untaxed black money deposited abroad; Ramdev demanded untaxed money should be declared to be the wealth of the nation and that the act of caching allegedly illegally obtained money in foreign banks should be declared a crime against the state.

The Ramlila Maidan was booked for 40 days to allow the protest to happen. Preparations included setting up a toilet, drinking water, medical facilities and a media centre. Ramdev said more than 100 million people were directly involved with the Bharat Swabhiman Andolan. Almost 3.2 million "netizens" joined the campaign.

On 5 June, police raided the Maidan, detaining Ramdev and removing his supporters after firing tear gas shells and lathicharging. Fifty-three people, including twenty police officers, were treated for injuries. Finance Minister Pranab Mukherjee called the police action "unfortunate" and said the police action was necessary because Ramdev had no permission to hold the protest. Ministers said permission had been granted for a yoga camp with 5,000 attendees but not for a 65,000-strong political protest. It was alleged the police raid had been planned for several days. The police said Ramdev had been informed shortly beforehand permission to continue his protest had been cancelled. By that time, over 5,000 police officers had been prepared for action. There was an allegation CCTV footage of the raid was missing.

On 6 June, the National Human Rights Commission of India requested reports of the events to be provided within two weeks by the Union Home Secretary, Delhi Chief Secretary, and the Delhi City Commissioner of Police. Hazare responded to the events by holding a one-day hunger strike. Protests were held across India, including Chennai, Bangalore, Mumbai, Hyderabad, Jammu, and Lucknow. They also spread to Nepal. Ramdev said a second phase of the Bharat Swabhiman Yatra would begin in October and would cover 100,000 kilometres (62,000 mi).

=== After the protest ===
==== Civil society response ====
Ramdev said the government was not serious about discussing corruption and black money, and that government negotiator Kapil Sibal had cheated him through a "scheming and cunning" attitude. He said there was a conspiracy to kill him and that he was threatened during a meeting with senior ministers. He also said the ruling government chairperson Sonia Gandhi and the United Progressive Alliance government will be responsible for any threat to his life, and that he was nearly strangled by the police. After being evicted from Delhi, Ramdev wanted to continue his fast at Noida but was denied permission to do so by the Uttar Pradesh government. He decided to continue his hunger strike and satyagraha from Haridwar until 12 June 2011.

Hazare said there might have been some faults with Ramdev's agitation, the beating up of people at night rather than in the daytime was a "blot on democracy", and that "there was no firing otherwise the eviction was similar to Jallianwala Bagh incident". He also said the "strangulation of democracy" would cause protests throughout the country to "teach government a lesson". Campaigner Arvind Kejriwal said the use of police force on non-violent, sleeping protesters was undemocratic.

==== Government response ====
Congress General Secretary Digvijay Singh said the government had reached an agreement before the protests were held. Prime Minister Manmohan Singh wrote to Ramdev asking him to desist from holding the protests. Nationalist Congress Party General Secretary Tariq Anwar said; "Both Hazare and Ramdev are blackmailing the government and they should first peep into their own hearts". Pawan Bansal said the midnight police raid "was not a crackdown, [the government] had to do it to maintain law and order". All India Congress Committee secretary Janardan Dwivedi described Ramdev's protest as a "political game" by the Bharatiya Janata Party (BJP), saying Ramdev got more attention than Nigamananda Saraswati, a protester who had fasted for over two months about a different matter, despite being treated in the same hospital.

==== Political party response ====
The BJP called the police action to break up the hunger strike "undemocratic". Gujarat Chief Minister Narendra Modi condemned the incident, comparing it with Ravana-Lila and adding; "It is one of the worst days of Indian history. The Prime Minister had said during the elections that he would bring back black money stashed in Swiss banks within 100 days of coming into power. But today, it is two years and nothing has happened." L. K. Advani said the police action reminded him of the Jallianwala Bagh massacre and called it "naked fascism". Leader of the Opposition in the Lok Sabha Sushma Swaraj said: "This is not democracy... the police cannot alone have taken such a step. It had the approval of the Prime Minister and full approval of the Congress President." Bahujan Samaj Party leader and Uttar Pradesh Chief Minister Mayawati condemned the government's action against Ramdev, demanded an investigation by the Supreme Court of India and said justice cannot be expected from the central government. The Samajwadi Party chief Mulayam Singh Yadav condemned the incident, saying it shows the Union Government has lost its mental balance. Blaming the ruling Indian National Congress party, Yadav said; "A Congress leader said that Baba is a thug. I want to say that Congress is the biggest thug and it should introspect its deeds." He also compared the raid to military action against a foreign enemy.

Rashtriya Janata Dal leader Lalu Prasad Yadav accused Ramdev of being a front for the Rashtriya Swayamsevak Sangh. The Communist Party of India (Marxist) termed the police action against Ramdev "deplorable and shortsighted" but found fault with him for making the issue of black money "farcical" by entering into a secret agreement with government. The party said; "The manner in which Ramdev's demands were drafted and the way in which he has conducted his interactions with the government, coming to a secret agreement to withdraw the hunger strike on the basis of assurances, then reneging and announcing its extension trivialised the seriousness of the issue of black money and made it farcical". The Shiv Sena strongly condemned the police action. Nitish Kumar, leader of Janata Dal (United) and the Chief Minister of Bihar, condemned the attack, saying; "It is a major blow to democracy and an attack on the democratic rights of the people ... It is also an attack on the fundamental rights of the citizens".

==== Suo Moto cognizance by the Supreme Court ====
An advocate of Ramdev petitioned the Supreme Court of India, saying no First Information Report had been registered with the police and thus the protesters' eviction was of dubious legality. The Supreme Court issued notices to the Union Home Secretary, Chief Secretary of Delhi, Delhi administration, and Delhi Police Commissioner, expressing its displeasure the entire contents of the petition had been leaked to the media before the matter went up for hearing. On 29 August 2011, the Court blamed the Delhi Police for the forcible eviction.

== August protests ==
By mid-June 2011, the Jan Lokpal drafting committee was in disagreement and government representatives said if a consensus was not reached, both the government draft and that by the civil society representatives, would be sent to the Cabinet. Hazare said if only the government version of the bill was passed by parliament, he would start a hunger strike on 16 August 2011. On 15 August, he announced the fast would begin the following day.

The government imposed Section 144 at Jayaprakash Narayan Path, Rajghat and Delhi Gate, prohibiting an assembly of five or more people. Delhi Police detained Hazare in the early morning of 16 August before he could start his hunger strike. More than 1,200 supporters, including members of Team Anna, were also taken into preventative custody. Most of the supporters, including Kiran Bedi and Shanti Bhushan, were released by early evening. Hazare was remanded to Tihar Jail after he refused to sign a personal bail bond. Within hours, a Team Anna spokesperson said Hazare had begun his hunger protest in custody and was not accepting water to drink. The arrests sparked protests across the country, and were condemned by opposition political parties and some non-government organisations. Parliament was unable to conduct business after a protest forced an adjournment for the day. In Chennai, Mahatma Gandhi's secretary V. Kalyanam, led the protesters. He said:

India will get a sure gold medal if corruption is entered as an item in the Olympic Games. We may not be a force in football or athletics or hockey. But India is the undisputed global leader in corruption.

Delhi police commissioner B. K. Gupta said the police were not keen for Hazare be sent to judicial custody and had been prepared to release him if he had given an undertaking not to break Section 144, and ask his supporters not to do so. In a message released after his detention, Hazare said this was the beginning of the "second freedom struggle" and he called on people to participate in a jail bharo (mass arrest) protest. On 16 August, Hazare and his close associate and lawyer Prashant Bhushan asked government employees across the country to go on mass leave to show solidarity with the movement. Union Home minister P. Chidambaram hoped they would not respond, describing the call as "completely wrong".

=== Hazare's release ===
It was decided to release Hazare after Prime Minister Manmohan Singh met party General Secretary Rahul Gandhi, who disapproved of the arrest, on the evening of 16 August. Congress sources said the Government decided to release him and his supporters after concluding keeping him in jail would disrupt law and order unnecessarily. Over 1,500 people who had been detained for taking part in protests demanding Hazare's release were also freed. Hazare refused to leave the jail until the government agreed to give unconditional permission to hold protests at Jai Prakash Narayan National Park.

Hazare agreed to leave jail after Delhi Police granted him permission to fast for 15 days at Ramlila Maidan, a larger venue than Jai Prakash Narayan National Park. He, however, had to spend another night in jail because the venue was not ready. Hazare left jail on 19 August for the 25,000-capacity Ramlila Maidan, which he said he would not leave until the bill was passed.

17 August 2011
- Congress stated they suspected a foreign hand in the protests and asked the government to investigate whether the US was behind Hazare's agitation. The US denied the accusation.
19 August 2011
- Varun Gandhi, a BJP MP, announced he would introduce Hazare's Jan Lokpal Bill in the Lok Sabha as a private member's bill, saying it was better than anything the nation has seen before.
21 August 2011
- Hazare's camp called their supporters to confront individual Members of Parliament and Union Ministers at their residences and warned the UPA government its days would be numbered if it failed to pass the Bill by 30 August.
- Over 100,000 supporters visited Ramlila Maidan to show their opposition to corruption.
- Around 50,000 supporters marched in Mumbai to support Hazare. This was reportedly one of the biggest protests in Mumbai.
22 August 2011
- On his seventh day of fast, Hazare said he would only negotiate with INC MP Rahul Gandhi, the Prime Minister's Office or Maharashtra Chief minister Prithviraj Chavan.
23 August 2011
- Manmohan Singh appealed to Hazare to end his fast and stated he would ask Lok Sabha Speaker Meira Kumar if Hazare's Jan Lokpal Bill can be sent to the Standing Committee. Singh also said the government was concerned about Hazare's health.
24 August 2011
- An all-party meeting was chaired by Manmohan Singh represented by finance minister Pranab Mukherjee. The meeting ended with Mukherjee appealing for Hazare to end his fast, prompting civil society to say they were "back to square one".
25 August 2011
- Manmohan Singh said all proposed versions of the Lokpal bill, including those prepared by Aruna Roy's NCPRI and Jaiprakash Narain, would be debated in Parliament.
- Union Minister Vilasrao Deshmukh met Hazare at his protest camp at Ramlila Maidan. Deshmukh conveyed a message to Hazare from the Prime Minister, urging Hazare to end his fast and to consider the Prime Minister's offer to debate all versions of bill in Parliament.
- Hazare asked Singh to start the parliamentary discussion the next morning and forward his demands to the Prime Minister; a Citizen's Charter, Lokayuktas in all states with Lokpal powers and inclusion of the entire bureaucracy.
27 August 2011
- Initiating the Lok Sabha debate on the bill, Pranab Mukherjee asked Hazare to end his fast, BJP leader Sushma Swaraj expressed her party's support for Hazare and said the BJP largely agreed with the conditions laid down by Hazare to end his hunger strike. The government agreed to a voice vote on the debate. Both houses of parliament passed the resolution accepting all three conditions set by Hazare.
28 August 2011
- Hazare ended his 12-day, 288-hour fast and was taken to Medanta Medicity to recover. He had been under medical supervision throughout the fast. Thousands of his supporters congregated at India Gate to celebrate.

=== Parliamentary debate ===
A debate on the Jan Lokpal bill was held in Parliament on 27 August 2011. Hazare demanded a citizen charter, lower bureaucracy to be included in the bill, and the establishment of Lok Ayuktas in the states. Both houses of Parliament agreed to these demands. Hazare announced he would break his fast on 28 August.

== December protests ==
On 11 December, Hazare sat on a day-long fast at the Jantar Mantar. This protest was against proposals of the Parliamentary Standing Committee on the anti-graft measure. It was the first at which politicians shared the stage with Hazare, with leaders of the BJP, Communist Party of India (Marxist), Communist Party of India, Janata Dal, Akali Dal, Telugu Desam Party and Biju Janata Dal participating in the public debate on the Lokpal bill. The expected introduction of the Lokpal bill in the Lok Sabha did not occur. The Food Security Bill was first introduced and the subsequent process of the Lokpal Bill was hindered by procedural and party political issues. The proposed Lokpal Bill was rejected by the government, which put forward a revised proposal, along with a constitutional bill, in an attempt to resolve the problems that were raised during the session about reservation for minorities and under-represented groups.

Hazare announced on 22 December a hunger strike would take place between 27 and 29 December, followed by a Jail Bharo Andolan to pressurise the government. He began his fast on 27 December at the Bandra Kurla Complex in Mumbai rather than in Delhi because of the cold climate in the latter city. Turnout was well below expectations, in part because of the cold weather. IAC members asked him to end this latest fast because of his poor health, having suffered from cold and mild fever for few days previously, but he refused. On the second day of the fast, Hazare repeated his threat to campaign against Congress in the five poll-bound states for not bringing a strong Lokpal. He ended his fast because of his deteriorating health and the low turn-out across the country. He said the movement had not stopped but was merely postponed. He also announced the cancellation of the "Jail Bharo" movement due to his bad health.

=== Parliament debate ===
The Lok Sabha debated the Lokpal Bill on 27 December 2011. The debate resulted in the bill being passed by the Rajya Sabha (upper house) but the new, nine-member Lokpal panel was not given constitutional status because the government failed to get the necessary two-thirds majority of MPs present. The Lokpal Bill was sent for review to the then President of India Pratibha Patil on 28 December 2011; a standard procedure for any legislation that has financial implications. Patil gave her assent for the Bill to be tabled in the Rajya Sabha.

== 2012 ==
2012 Indian anti-corruption movement
- Date: 25 March 2012 – 26 November 2012 (8 months and 1 day)
- Location: India
- Caused by: Government corruption; Police corruption; Judicial corruption; Corporate corruption; Kleptocracy; Electoral fraud; Red tape; Discretionary powers of politician; Black money
- Goals: Jan Lokpal Bill/The Lokpal Bill, 2011 enactment
- Methods: Non violent protest
- Result: Aam Aadmi Party; Enactment of The Lokpal and Lokayuktas Act, 2013

The movement was reinvigorated following a mass gathering at the Jantar Mantar in New Delhi on 25 March 2012. Attempts to introduce some form of legislation, even though it was weaker than that demanded by the activists, had expired with the end of the parliamentary session on 27 December 2011. The government reintroduced the bill in the Rajya Sabha in February 2012 but it was not timetabled for debate and the session ended without the bill being passed.

=== Protests ===
Hazare said the protest movement would recommence and he went on a one-day hunger strike on 25 March 2012. A month later, Hazare held a token one-day fast focussed on the remembrance of whistle-blowers such as Narendra Kumar and Satyendra Dubey, who had died as a result of their support for the anti-corruption cause. On 3 June, Hazare undertook another one-day fast at the Jantar Mantar, where he was joined by Ramdev.

Hazare and Bedi reformed Team Anna while Kejriwal and some others split from the apolitical movement to form what was to become the Aam Aadmi Party.

An indefinite fast began at the Jantar Mantar on 25 July and involved members of Team Anna, although Hazare was not involved until four days later. The fast was a protest against the government's refusal of an inquiry against the prime minister and 14 cabinet ministers whom the protesters had accused of corruption. The fast ended on 3 August. Three days later, Hazare announced he and his fellow activists had decided to end their fast because the government did not seem ready to enact the Jan Lokpal Bill, to discontinue talks with the government and to cease any protests under the Team Anna name.

=== Aftermath ===
After failing to press the Indian government to pass The Lokpal Bill, 2011, Team Anna was split on the issue of the formation of a political party. Anna Hazare and some others did not want to enter mainstream politics while Arvind Kejriwal led the campaigning group India Against Corruption, and later formed the Aam Aadmi Party (AAP) on 26 November 2012. The party made its electoral debut in the December 2013 Delhi legislative assembly election. It emerged as the second-largest party, winning 28 of the 70 seats, and went on to form a minority government with conditional support from the Indian National Congress. The AAP failed to pass a Jan Lokpal Bill in the Delhi assembly and resigned from the government after 49 days. President's rule was imposed in the state for a year.

The Parliament of India enacted The Lokpal and Lokayuktas Act, 2013 few days after the Delhi election in December 2013.

== Media coverage ==
An Insignificant Man, a 2017 Hindi/English Indian socio-political documentary, was co-produced and directed by Khushboo Ranka and Vinay Shukla, and was also co-produced by Anand Gandhi. The documentary is about the rise of anti-corruption protests in India and the formation and rise to power of the AAP.

== Allegations against the movement ==
The Anna Hazare movement was criticised by various people as having collusion with corporations, the opposition BJP, and the ideological organisation RSS. Chandra Mohan, who was part of the national committee of India Against Corruption, said that the movement was stage-managed by the RSS. Activist lawyer Prashant Bhushan, who was one of the founding members of the movement, also claimed that the movement was propped up by BJP-RSS, and he regretted not seeing it earlier.

== See also ==
- Right to Public Services legislation
- Lokayukta
- Corruption Perceptions Index
- Rent seeking
- Socio-economic issues in India
- Mafia Raj
- International asset recovery
- 2013 Save RTI Movement in India
- List of scandals in India
- Licence Raj
- Arab Spring
