= Sandeep A. Varma =

Indian film director and writer (born 1969)

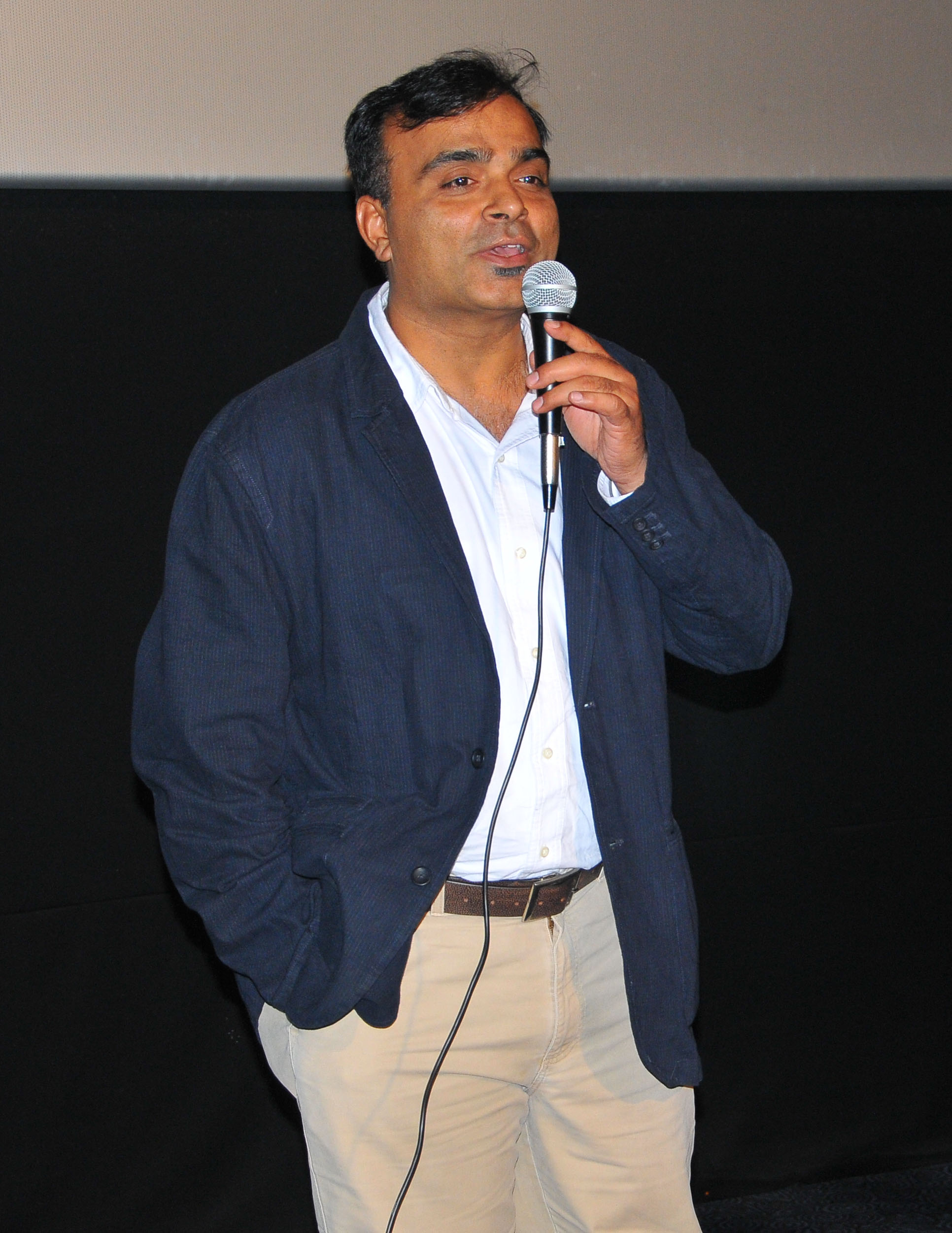
- Sandeep at a screening of Manjunath at IIMPact 2014 in Singapore
- Born: 1969 (age 56–57); Delhi, India
- Occupation: Film director/writer

Sandeep A. Varma (born 1969 in New Delhi) is an Indian film director and writer. He is best known for Manjunath (Film) (2014), a biopic based on the true story of Manjunath Shanmugam, the IIML graduate and Indian Oil sales officer who was killed by the mafia for exposing corruption in the oil sector.

== Early life ==
Varma received his early education from St. Columba's School, Delhi and then received a B.E from BITS Pilani and an MBA from FMS Delhi.

== Career ==
Sandeep A. Varma has written and directed many TV commercials such as for IMS-ICAP, as well as several short films, two of which - ‘Water Conservation’ and ‘Street Children’ - were screened at the Kerala International film festival (2003) and Philadelphia Short film festival (2003). In 2014, Sandeep wrote and directed the feature film Manjunath based on the life of Manjunath Shanmugam. Paloma Sharma in Rediff.com called Manjunath "a brave film". Taran Adarsh in Bollywood Hungama called it "realistic and powerful". Sify.com called Varma "an astute storyteller".

In his recent works, he has written and directed the web series 'Us and them' released on December 1, 2023 as Ishqiyapa on Amazon Mini TV with JAR pictures, starring Paramvir Singh Cheema, Nunui Rualhleng, Mukesh Tiwari, Vinay Pathak, Sushmita Mukherjee playing pivotal roles in the series.

In 2016, Sandeep wrote and directed The Virgins, a short film with Pia Bajpai, Divyendu Sharma and Akshay Oberoi. The Virgins is a tongue in cheek approach to the social stigma around virginity in India. He wrote and directed Kahanibaaz, a digital short thriller nominated as a semi-finalist in the Los Angeles Cine Fest and at the Pune Short Film Festival. Filmmamker Vishal Bharadwaj called Kahanibaaz a "well written and directed film". In 2019, Sandeep directed The Disguise, an 18-minute short film in London which won the Ritwik Ghatak Award at the 2nd South Asian Short Film Festival and was screened at the 14th Habitat Film Festival in Delhi.

Sandeep Varma is a co-founder of Filmboard Movies. In 2017, Sandeep along with Rajesh Butta started Filmboard, a disruptive omni-channel, B2B marketplace for any film production services. Varma is part of the elite academic council of SPJIMR's new program PSMEM which was launched in partnership with The Times of India Group.

== Filmography ==
=== Director ===
- Kahin Door (2001)
- Manjunath (2014)
- The Virgins (2016)
- Kahanibaaz (2018)
- The Disguise (2019)
- Ishqyapa (2023)

=== Awards ===
- 2015: Screen Award for Best Screenplay – Manjunath (Film) (Won)
- 2015: Screen Award for Most Promising Debut Director – Manjunath (Film) (Nominated)
- 2015: Ramnath Goenka Award for Excellence in Cinema – Manjunath (Film) (Won)
