= SharingDard =

Web portal for social venting

- Website type: Emotional Network and support
- Available in: English
- Website: sharingdard.com
- Commercial: No
- Registration: Optional
- Users: 32,756
- Launched: May 2013
- Current status: Offline

SharingDard was an online portal for social venting which provides an outlet to share the emotional turmoils that one faces throughout their journey in life.

== History ==
The website SharingDard.com was started by Sumant Gajbhiye, Ritika Sharma, Gaurav Rajan and Lima James, IIM Lucknow graduates. The website is a result of their personal and professional experiences and a subsequent research. SharingDard officially started in May 2013 and has over 20000 registered users as in September 2013. The identity of the users is hidden and privacy is assured on the website. A new story is shared every 15 minutes or so.

Among the users, 65 percent are women and the rest are youngsters (16 to 35 years of age) who share problems related to examination stress, job tension, relationship issues and societal pressures. The highlight of the website is that the people connect with one another emotionally and help each other out, thus making it a peer to peer counselling place.

The founders are looking to raise funds from Angel Investors or Venture Capitalists soon to the tune of 5-10 crores. They also have plans to integrate it with their Telephonic counseling arm, Your Candid Friend.
