= Joker in the Pack =

2007 book by Neeraj Pahlajani

Joker in the Pack - An Irreverent View of Life at IIMs
- Cover of the book
- Author: Neeraj Pahlajani; Ritesh Sharma
- Language: English
- Genre: Fiction
- Publisher: Orient Paperbacks
- Publication date: 2007
- Publication place: India
- Media type: Print (Paperback)
- Pages: 198
- ISBN: 978-81-222-0457-5
- OCLC: 294882441

Joker in the Pack - An Irreverent View of Life at IIMs is a work of fiction by IIM Bangalore alumnus Neeraj Pahlajani and IIM Lucknow alumnus Ritesh Sharma. It was published in September 2007 by Orient Paperbacks and was a bestseller in India. The novel features a section devoted to Manjunath Shanmugam and the Manjunath Shanmugam Trust.

== Synopsis ==
The novel describes the student life of Shekhar Verma, a middle-class boy who grows up in the post liberalization era in India. Shekhar is described as a typical boy growing up in urban India - focused on Bollywood and Cricket. As he becomes older and faces board exams, he is pressured by his parents, relatives and neighbors to take life seriously and to consider pursuing a career in information technology. In order to achieve this goal, he decides to pursue his graduation in Information Technology but is disheartened when the IT bubble bursts and salaries plummet. Shekhar then trains his eyes on the Indian Institutes of Management (IIMs), in the hope that an MBA from an IIM would help him get his dream job. The book describes in detail Shekhar's life at IIM Bangalore and introduces various personalities that make up life there. Shekhar is shown to mature as the book progresses, ultimately questioning the choices he has made, which though make him successful as per society's expectations, leave him confused about what he really wants in life.
