= Satyendra Dubey =

Indian murder victim

- Born: 27 November 1973; Shahpur, Bihar
- Died: 27 November 2003 (aged 30); Gaya, Bihar
- Cause of death: Assassination
- Education: IIT Kanpur; Banaras Hindu University (now Indian Institute of Technology, BHU)
- Occupation: Project Director
- Employer: Govt. of India
- Organization(s): IES, Ministry of Road Transport & Highways
- Known for: Killed for exposing corruption in NHAI project
- Notable work: Exposed corruption in Government system

Satyendra Dubey (27 November 1973 – 27 November 2003) was an Indian Engineering Service (IES) officer. He was the Project Director in the National Highways Authority of India (NHAI) at Koderma, Jharkhand. He was assassinated in Gaya, Bihar, allegedly for his anti-corruption related actions in the Golden Quadrilateral highway construction project.

== Early life ==
Satyendra Dubey, the son of Bageshwari Dubey and Phulamati Devi, was born in the village of Shahpur, near Pratappur Sugar Factory in the Siwan district of Bihar, India. The family of seven children, five girls and two boys, subsisted on a small piece of land, and Bageshwari also held a low-paying clerical position in a nearby sugar mill. Until the age of 15, he studied at the Ganga Box Kanodiya High School in Shahpur and then joined junior college at Allahabad, about three hundred kilometers away. Satyendra was the topper of the state in 10th and 12th board exams. He gained admission to the Civil Engineering Department of IIT Kanpur in 1990 and graduated in 1994. He would subsequently complete his M. Tech (Civil Engg.) from the Institute of Technology, Banaras Hindu University (now Indian Institute of Technology, BHU) in 1996.

== Professional life ==
After his masters, Satyendra joined the Indian Engineering Service (IES) and in July 2002, went on deputation to the National Highway Authority of India (NHAI). Dubey became the Project Director at Koderma, Jharkhand, responsible for managing a part of the Aurangabad-Barachatti section of National Highway 2 (The Grand Trunk Road). This highway was part of the Golden Quadrilateral (GQ) Corridor Project, the Prime Minister's initiative, which aimed to connect many of the country's major cities by four-lane limited-access highways totaling 14,000 km, at an overall cost more than US$10 billion. During this period, Dubey got the contractor of the project to suspend three of his engineers after exposing serious financial irregularities. At one point, he had the contractor rebuild six kilometers of under-quality road, a huge loss for the road contract mafia.

== Murder and aftermath ==
On 27 November 2003, his 30th birthday, Dubey was returning from a wedding in Varanasi and called his driver to meet him at the station. He reached Gaya railway station at three in the morning and found that the car was not able to come because of a battery malfunction. It appears that at this point, Dubey decided to take a rickshaw home. When he didn’t reach home, his driver went to look for him and found him dead by the side of the road in the suburb of A.P. Colony. He had been shot. The news ignited tremendous public hue and cry. The matter was raised in Parliament, and the Prime Minister shifted the onus of investigation from the Bihar Police (who might themselves be implicated) to the CBI.

The CBI registered a case against unknown persons under 120-B (criminal conspiracy) and 302 (murder) of Indian Penal Code and various provision under the Arms Act on 14 December 2003.

=== The investigation ===
In early investigations, the CBI interrogated the rickshaw puller Pradeep Kumar, who was caught using Dubey's stolen cell phone. The mobile phone had been switched off for about a fortnight after the murder, but then Kumar called his 'second wife' in Kolkata, following which the CBI traced the rickshaw puller to his slum in Gaya. Although Kumar had a criminal history in similar cases of robbery, it appears he was released after interrogation, and could not be traced a month later. Two other suspects, Sheonath Sah and Mukendra Paswan, were questioned by the CBI. They were found dead from poisoning on 1 February 2004, within 25 hours of the CBI questioning. Sah's father lodged an FIR against the CBI with the Bihar Police, but CBI Director Uma Shanker Mishra called their deaths a suicide in a press meeting a few days later. The CBI later arrested four persons, Uday Mallah, Mantu Kumar, Tutu Kumar and Babloo, all belonging to Katari village of Gaya on 6 June 2004. On 13 June, the CBI arrested another accused Sarvan Paswan. In conclusion of its investigations, CBI arraigned four persons on 3 September 2004. Based on testimony by Pradeep Kumar, who was his rickshaw puller, the event was presented as an attempted robbery. Because Satyendra put up a fight about giving up his briefcase, he was shot. The person accused of actually shooting Dubey with a country-made pistol was Mantu Kumar, son of Lachhu Singh, of Village Katari, Gaya district. Accomplices with him included Uday Kumar, Pinku Ravidas and Shravan Kumar.

Mantu Kumar was arrested near his home in Panchayatee Khada in Gaya. He had apparently been living in Gaya town and working as a rickshaw puller. On 19 September 2005, while the case was being heard in Patna, Bihar in the court of Addl. Session Judge, J M Sharma, Mantu Kumar escaped from the court premises, leading to widespread allegations of police complicity. While Mantu was being held at the high security Beur Jail, the invigilation can be lax during such court appearances, and it is a common tactic of the mafia to organise a few policemen to make it possible for the criminal to escape. It was felt that the escape was engineered by higher-ups who may have executed the murder through Mantu Kumar. The CBI announced a cash reward of ₹1,00,000 for apprehending Mantu.

=== CBI Report and Conviction of accused ===
It is possible that Dubey may have been the victim of a simple robbery during which Mantu Kumar shot him, as alleged in the case filed by CBI. However, given the death and disappearance of several witnesses and the startling escape of the prime accused, there is widespread speculation that vested interests may have engaged the criminals who actually pulled the trigger. As for the GQ project, the Supreme Court is currently overlooking investigations into the corruption charges initially raised by the Dubey letter. Several officials have been indicted, and a technical team is overseeing the actual construction. Also, as of September 2005, news reports indicated that the law ministry was about to introduce legislation to protect whistleblowers. Meanwhile, on 10 February 2006, a 600-meter stretch of the GQ highway connecting Kolkata to Chennai subsided into the ground, opening up a ten-meter gorge near Bally, West Bengal. This stretch had been executed as a joint venture between two Malaysian firms RBM and Pati, who had been awarded the contract after global tendering.

More than six years after the murder, on 22 March 2010, a Patna Court convicted three accused Mantu Kumar, Udai Kumar and Pinku Ravidas for murdering Dubey. The court convicted accused Mantu Kumar under the Indian Penal Code (IPC) Sections 302 (Murder) and 394 (Voluntarily causing hurt in committing robbery), and section 27 (A) of the Arms Act for possessing an unlicensed weapon. The other two accused were convicted under Section 302/34 (Murder committed in furtherance of common intention) and 394 IPC.

== Legacy ==
=== Awards and Fellowships dedicated to Satyendra Dubey ===
Dubey's murder drew several protests in India and abroad, especially by the media. Student and Alumni bodies of IITs took the lead in raising this issue. S. K. Dubey Foundation for Fight Against Corruption was founded in the US by Ashutosh Aman (IIT Kanpur, Satyendra's batchmate) and Atal Bansal (IIT Kanpur) to systematically fight against corruption. IIT Kanpur instituted an annual award in his name, Satyendra K Dubey Memorial Award, to be given to an IIT alumnus for displaying the highest professional integrity in upholding human values.

The Indian Express also announced a fellowship in the name of Dubey.

Institute for Research and Documentation in Social Sciences (IRDS), a Non-governmental organisation from Lucknow has been awarding the Satyendra Dubey award for civil services in reverence to his contributions to the cause of fighting corruption.

=== Awards given to Satyendra Dubey ===
- Whistleblower of the year award from the London-based Index on Censorship,
- The Transparency International's Annual integrity award.
- The Service Excellence award from the India Management Association.
- He was nominated for the Padma awards in 2011.

== In popular media ==
- On 26 November 2007 NDTV aired a documentary by Minnie Vaid on Satyendra Dubey, produced by Ashutosh Aman on behalf of the S K Dubey Foundation.
- Indian musician Rabbi Shergill has dedicated one stanza in his song titled 'Bilqis (Jinhe Naaz Hai)' from album Avengi Ja Nahin to Satyendra Dubey. This song is a dedication to all those who died in vain or while supporting some cause (anti-corruption).
- Indian crime television series, Crime Patrol, dedicated their hundredth episode to Satyendra Dubey on 7 April 2012.
- His story was highlighted in the final episode of Satyamev Jayate.
- Also his story was shown in Savdhaan India of Life OK channel.

== See also ==
- Shanmughan Manjunath: An IIM Lucknow graduate and Indian Oil Corporation employee, Manjunath was murdered by the oil mafia in 2005 when he tried to check petrol adulteration in Lakhimpur Kheri, Uttar Pradesh.
- Narendra Kumar was an IPS officer murdered by alleged members of mining mafia in Rajasthan
- Whistleblower J. N. Jayashree
