= Avinash Iragavarapu =

American politician

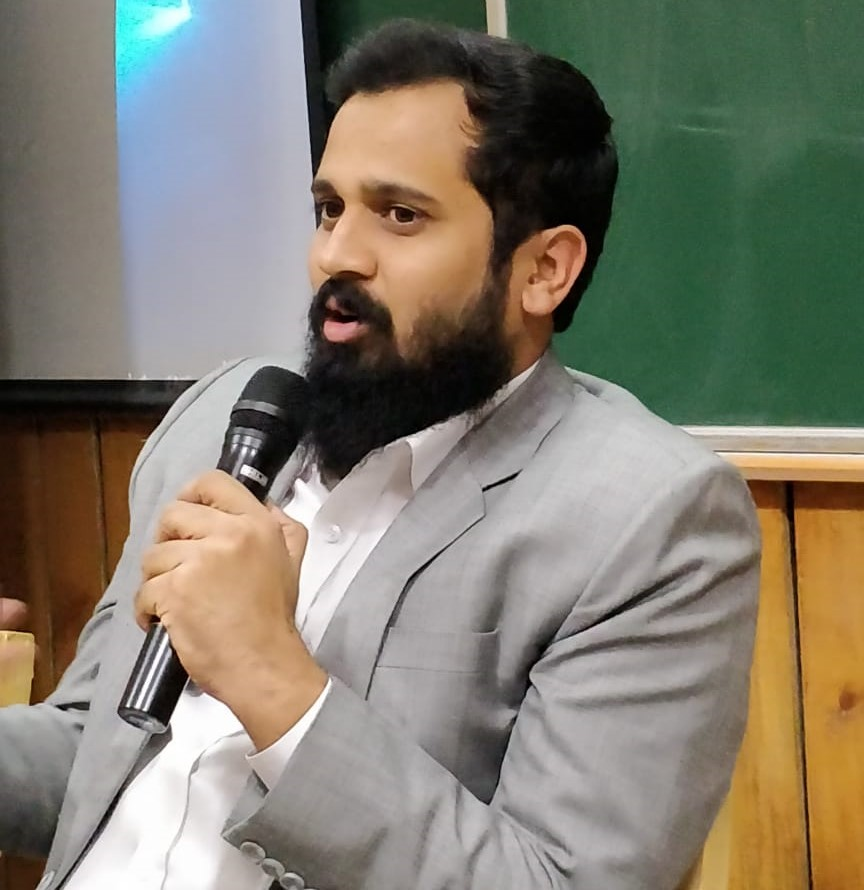
- Avinash Iragavarapu

Avinash Iragavarapu is a Political Campaign Strategist and was also the Executive Director of the Arizona Republican Party. He started his political campaign stint in the year 2013 with the YSR Congress Party and has since then helped several Political Parties strategize their Campaign.

== Personal life ==
Avinash is from Rajahmundry, Andhra Pradesh, India. He received an MBA degree from IIM Lucknow. He is of Telugu descent.

== Political Campaign Experience ==
Avinash started Political Campaigning with the YSR Congress Party in Andhra Pradesh in the year 2013 after quitting his job at HCL.

In 2014, Avinash moved to the US where he campaigned for a candidate named Doug Ducey. After Doug Ducey became governor, he was promoted to the post of Executive Director of the Arizona Republican Party where through his analytical skills and strategic thinking he helped the party in winning the state in the United States Presidential Election 2016.

As of 2016, he was engaged with different political parties and helping them in designing an effective political campaign. He briefly worked with Kamal Haasan to structure and help his new political party Makkal Needhi Maiam.
