= Joker in the Pack (disambiguation) =

Joker in the Pack is a 2007 novel by Neeraj Pahlajani and Ritesh Sharma.

Joker in the Pack may also refer to:

- Joker in the Pack, an album by The Adicts
- "Joker in the Pack", a song The Adicts from Live and Loud
