= Manjunath (film) =

- Theatrical release poster
- Directed by: Sandeep A. Varma
- Written by: Sandeep A. Varma
- Produced by: Viacom 18 Motion Pictures; National Film Development Corporation of India; ICOMO Films
- Starring: Sasho Satiiysh; Seema Biswas; Divya Dutta; Yashpal Sharma
- Cinematography: Prakash Kutty
- Edited by: Sandeep Francis
- Music by: Sonam-Nitin-Subir; Parikrama (band)
- Production companies: NFDC; Icomo
- Distributed by: Viacom 18 Motion Pictures
- Release date: 9 May 2014
- Running time: 129 minutes
- Country: India
- Language: Hindi
- Budget: ₹3 crore (US$310,000)
- Box office: ₹30 crore (US$3.1 million)

Manjunath is an Indian drama film written and directed by Sandeep A. Varma based on the true story of Manjunath Shanmugam, the Indian Institute of Management Lucknow graduate who was killed in Lakhimpur, U.P., in November 2005, for his stand against corruption and fuel adulteration.

== Plot ==
In the hinterland of Uttar Pradesh 27-year-old Manjunath Shanmugam is a student at the state-of-the-art campus of the IIM-L. After graduating, Manjunath joins a petroleum company as a sales officer. He is posted in Lakhimpur Kheri, a remote district in rural Uttar Pradesh. One day Manjunath goes missing.

His friends panic, because they know that recently he had been very disturbed and was behaving strangely. He had become serious and scared. He was different from the Manjunath they knew in college, who was always jovial, fun-loving, friendly, and a great entertainer.

One of his friends finds him, but Manjunath is frantic. They send him back to his hometown. Manjunath's parents try to convince him to leave his job at IOCL that is causing him stress. Initially he seems willing but slowly he realises that he doesn't want to be a quitter. (Manjunath believes that, being from a top institute in the country, he has been given an opportunity. As the eldest son of a mineworker, he has had a humble upbringing.)

He realises that the kerosene, mixed with diesel, is coming from ration shops — 'it's the poor people's kerosene'. In addition, he becomes conscious of the extent of pollution caused by burning adulterated fuel. He finds strength and comes back to fight, against his parents wishes.

There is a clear threat to his life, because he insists on doing his duty to stop petrol adulteration. This time, Manjunath is not deterred. He continues doing what he considers right, without worrying about the consequences. As a result, one night he gets brutally killed by the people who are harmed by him doing his duty. His family and friends suffer over his death. They wonder why he put himself in so much danger.

Slowly, the worst fears start coming true. Beyond the initial grief, no one wants to come forward to carry on the fight.

In the film, Manjunath is shown watching what happens after he dies. He is starting to feel that it is all pointless. He cannot watch his parents' tears any more: What was their fault? Maybe he should have compromised. But how can people not see what he has? What he fought was something very big and very important.

Suddenly, people who have no connection to him realise the importance of what Manjunath did and start trying to do something. Like novices, they search their way around: Their will is strong. They start getting help again from unexpected quarters. It is nerve-wracking, with dangers for everyone. Then, instead of one or two, there are a lot of people helping. Manjunath, who has lost hope, realises that it's not all going to waste.

He hopes and prays that they succeed.

The film cuts back and forth from a rock concert. The conflict of the story is not whether Manjunath lived or died, but if the effect of Manjunath lives or dies, and in the end that's the victory.

== Cast ==
- Sasho Satiiysh Saarathy as Manjunath
- Anand Nandkumar as Manjunath's brother
- Divya Dutta as Anjali Mullatti
- Seema Biswas as Manjunath's mother
- Kishor Kadam as Manjunath's father
- Yashpal Sharma as Golu Goyal
- Rajesh Khattar as Raina, Manjunath's boss
- Asif Basra as Devendra
- Anjori Alagh as Sujata
- Faisal Rashid as Gautam
- Gireesh Sahedev as H.Jaishankar
- Vineet Kumar as I.B. Singh
- Shishir Sharma as Golu's father
- Saksham Dayma as Inspector Shukla
- Nalneesh Neel as Paanwala

== Production ==
=== Development ===
In an interview with Firstpost, director Sandeep A. Varma stated,

"Manjunath actually picked me. One day, I got a call from the Manjunath Trust Trustees who were fighting his case. They wanted some creative work like posters, etc. to be created pro bono and had got to know that I had a creative advertising background.
As I researched on Manjunath, two things staggered me. One was he was totally unlike what I'd thought he would be. I'd thought he'd be idealistic, preachy, etc but he was interesting, very ordinary in the sense of how we used to be in college, he made mistakes, was a musician – basically very cinematic. It made me curious that if he was so 'like any of us' then what happened to him to make him do what he did? Secondly, also that the people fighting his case, did not know him, were not doing it for glory or money, just strangers, taking on something thousands of miles away, just because they were inspired by what he did.
I thought these may be ingredients of a story worth telling."

=== Official support ===
The film was supported by the Manjunath Shanmugam Trust through which the support of IIM-Lucknow and Manjunath's parents were enlisted.

=== Filming ===
Manjunath was primarily shot in Lucknow and areas around, including at the IIM. The rest of the portions were filmed in Mumbai and Bangalore. The filming in U.P. was done under a pseudo-name of being a romantic movie, to avoid the attention of the local people and media. Sandeep and his crew had a close shave with a few corrupt petrol pump owners whilst shooting which forced him to choose the cover story. “Unlike the collective memory of the rest of the country, Manjunath’s story is still alive in Uttar Pradesh. We didn’t want to put the 100-crew unit at risk,” said director Sandeep A. Varma, in an interview with The Indian Express.

== Music ==
The soundtrack is composed by Sonam Sherpa, Nitin Malik and Subir Malik of Delhi-based rock band Parikrama. The film has four original songs with lyrics penned by Rajneesh Bisht and Sandeep A. Varma. The track "Shlokas" is the first rock rendition of the Bhagavad Gita in Bollywood.

| No. | Title | Length |
|---|---|---|
| 1. | "Amma" (performed by Shankar Mahadevan; lyrics by Rajneesh Bisht and Sandeep A. Varma) | 4:12 |
| 2. | "The Rock Song" (performed by KK; lyrics by Rajneesh Bisht and Sandeep A. Varma) | 5:33 |
| 3. | "Gol" (performed by Papon; lyrics by Rajneesh Bisht and Sandeep A. Varma) | 6:16 |
| 4. | "Shlokas" (performed by Sukriti, Shambhunath, Arindam; lyrics courtesy The Bhagavad Gita) | 3:04 |

== Release ==
Manjunath was released in India on 9 May 2014.

== Reception ==
=== Critical response ===
Critic Taran Adarsh gave 3.5 stars out of 5 and states that, "Manjunath is a film that is realistic, brave and powerful. Critic Subhash K. Jha also gave 3.5 stars out of 5 saying, "The director pieces together Manjunath's story like Orson Welles' Citizen Kane. For The Times of India, Renuka Vyavahare wrote, "One of the least promoted films of the week, Manjunath pleasantly surprises you with its thought-provoking, hard-hitting content and earnest execution. What also set the film apart are its heart-rending parent-child moments and heartfelt performances. Renowned artistes Seema Biswas (as Manju's mother) and Kishor Kadam (Manju's father) deserve awards for their tear-evoking acts." She gave the film 3 stars out of 5. Rajeev Masand for IBN Live gave it a rating of 3/5, calling it "An important story that deserves to be heard." Sify.com gave it 3.5 out of 5 saying, "Don't miss this rare gem. Varma is an astute storyteller, also showcasing a flair for cinematic style. The atmospherics are delightful, and so are the nuances (right from Manjunath's nerdy dressing sense to his worn-out steering wheel cover). Music by Parikrama is superb, even if too much at times."

Rahul Desai for Mumbai Mirror wrote, "The sign of a good biopic, like a documentary, is its current relevance and ability to transcend flaws, as well as the first emotion it elicits from viewers. I felt wronged, and grew stronger as things progressed, only to be shaken by the truth of how relatable Manjunath's psychological struggle was. The tragic part is that Manjunath wasn't a hero; he only had his eyes open in an unrelenting world." He gave it 3 stars out of 5. Paloma Sharma for Rediff.com gave it 3 stars out of 5 and said, "Several scenes even take place from beyond the grave and this turn of events ruins the fast-paced, crisply edited aspect of the film and hence, the early promise it showed. That said though, Manjunath is a brave film, like the man it is based on, as it openly takes on the issue of caste and class – an everyday discrimination that the protagonist faced."

=== Response from Manjunath's family ===
In an open letter to DNA, Manjunath's brother S. Raghavendran, as a response to the film's low box office response, wrote,

"We saw Manjunath come alive in front of our eyes last weekend in the theatre near you. A few people had come forward to honour his memory. Why? Was he useless? Did what he did not matter to anyone? Would you react the same way if your loved one is brutally killed for doing his duty?
It’s not a movie with an item song or love story or the one which audience normally expect. It’s poignant, isn’t it... an ordinary man fighting against corruption and getting brutally killed. I only wish and hope that more people should know of his real story, what he did, why, what he stood for, and get inspired by him. Let’s all start dreaming about a corruption free country. Don’t we have the right to at least start dreaming and thinking in that direction?"

== Television premiere ==
Manjunath had its world television premiere on 19 November 2014 (Manjunath's death anniversary) on &Pictures (Zee Group).

To create awareness, &Pictures organised on-ground events at notable colleges as such IIM Ahmedabad, IIM Indore, IIM Lucknow and St. Andrew's College, Mumbai, where a panel discussion was held on the topic “Are heroes like Manjunath ‘brave’ or ‘stupid’ in doing what they do?” The panelists included the film's director Sandeep A. Varma; Raghavendran Shanmugam (Manjunath's brother); cast members from the movie like Sasho Satiiysh, Yashpal Sharma and Rajesh Khattar; notable government officials and IPS officers; and faculty members from the institutes. The events were covered by mainline and regional press.
