= Nitin Seth =

Indian entrepreneur (born 1971)

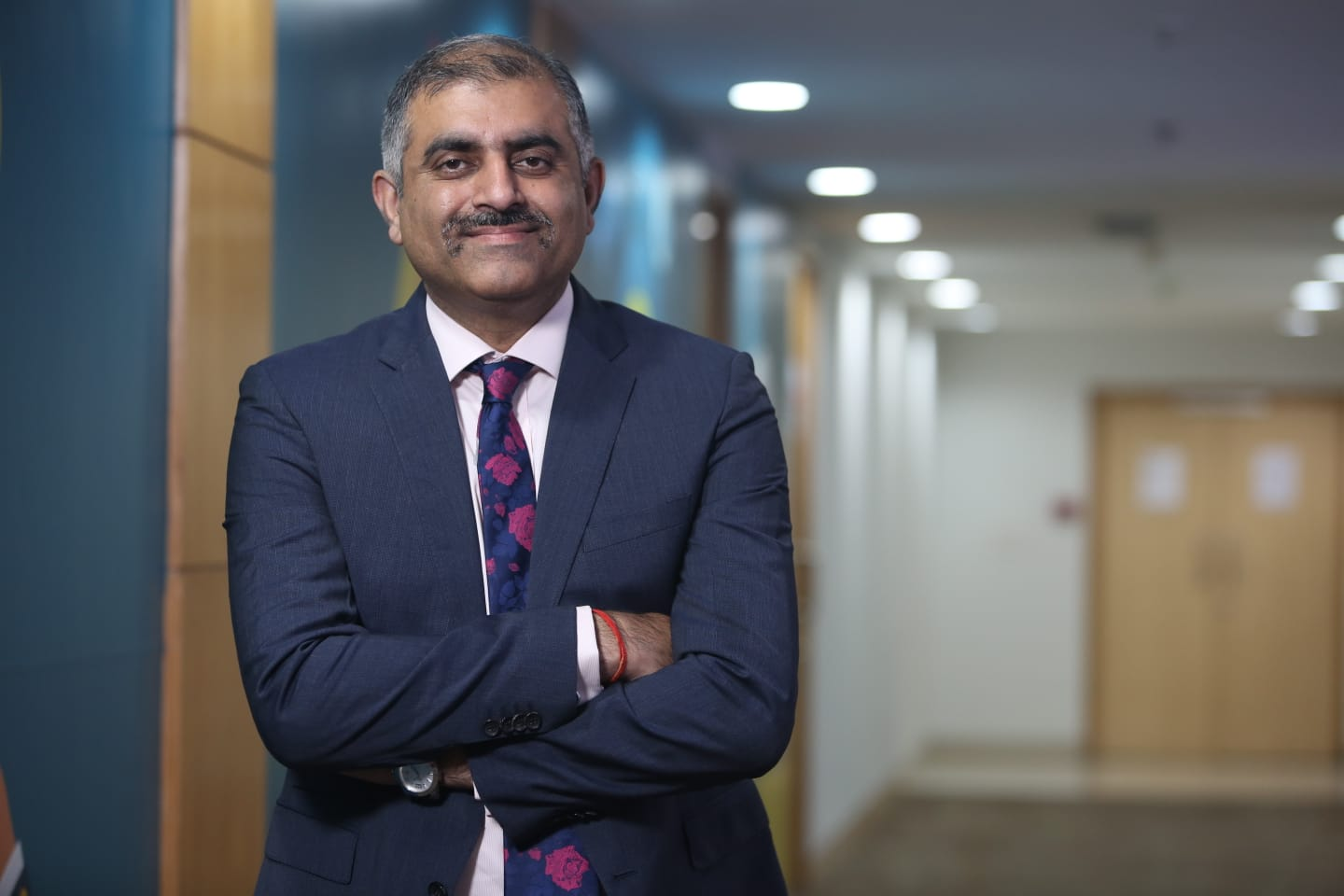
- Born: 10 August 1971 (age 55); Delhi, India
- Education: IIT Delhi, IIM Lucknow
- Occupations: Entrepreneur and author
- Known for: Co-Founder and CEO of Incedo; COO of Flipkart; Chairperson of NASSCOM; Co-founder of Plaksha University
- Notable work: Winning in the Digital Age" (2021) "Mastering The Data Paradox" (2024) "Human Edge in the AI Age" (2025)

Nitin Seth is an Indian tech entrepreneur and author who was the COO of Flipkart. He is the Co-Founder and CEO of Incedo, a US-based digital transformation services and platforms provider. An alumnus of the Indian Institute of Management Lucknow, he has been Managing Director of Fidelity International in India. He served as Chairperson of NASSCOM's GCC Council and was the Chairperson of the NASSCOM Regional Council (NRC) in Haryana, India. He is the co-founder of Plaksha University, a private science and technology university based in Punjab, India.

== Education ==
He graduated from the Indian Institute of Technology Delhi with a B.Tech degree. He holds an MBA from the Indian Institute of Management Lucknow.

== Career ==
He started his career with McKinsey and Company, where he worked for 14 years. He was serving as the director of McKinsey's Global Knowledge Centre in India (McKC) when he left the company.

Nitin Seth joined Flipkart as the chief people officer in February 2016, appointed by its co-founder Binny Bansal. In less than 6 months, he was promoted to Chief Administrative Officer. Later, in January 2017, he was made Chief Operations Officer of the company when Kalyan Krishnamurthy took over as Flipkart CEO from co-founder Binny Bansal, who took over as group CEO. During his tenure as the COO of Flipkart, he also assumed control of Flipkart's in-house logistics arm Ekart.

In May 2017, Seth resigned from the company, citing personal reasons, as reported by The Economic Times. Later, in July 2017, he served a legal notice to Flipkart, calling "his removal was illegal".

Before joining Flipkart, Nitin Seth worked as the managing director and Country Head of Fidelity International for 6 years, overseeing its offshore operations across India and Tunisia. In October 2017, Seth was appointed as CEO of Incedo Inc., a San Francisco-based engineering services company.

=== NASSCOM ===
Nitin chaired the National Association of Software and Service Companies (NASSCOM) Regional Council for Haryana and helped create the IT policy for the Haryana. He has championed the development of the start-up ecosystem, creating a forward-looking IT Policy for the state and infrastructure improvements in Gurgaon, Haryana.

He set up and served as the chairman of the NASSCOM forum for Global In-house Centers (GICs) for North India and has led the industry-wide initiative to develop the vision and strategic roadmap for GICs. He was the Chairperson of the National GIC Council and was part of the NASSCOM Executive Council. He was the founding member of the NASSCOM GCC council.

== Published work ==
In 2021, Nitin authored a book titled, Winning in the Digital Age, which was published by Penguin Random House. It reached the #18 Amazon Best Seller, as of July 2021. The book was translated in Hindi by Manjul Publication with the title ‘Digital Yug Mein Safalta’. A new edition of the book was released in 2023.

The book won a silver medal at the Axiom Business Book Awards 2022 in the Business Technology category, a Gold Stevie at the International Business Awards 2022 in Best Business Book category, a silver Stevie at the American Business Awards 2022 in the Best Business Book category. Also, the book won the 2022 CK Prahalad Best Business Book Awards at the Bangalore Business Literature Festival.

In 2024, Nitin authored his second book titled, Mastering The Data Paradox, which was published by Penguin Random House. It emerged as an Amazon and Penguin national bestseller within a week of its release. The book achieved the #1 bestseller position across multiple categories, including Hot New Releases, Artificial Intelligence, Databases & Big Data, Computer Science and Business Development & Entrepreneurship.

It was a Silver Stevie winner at The International Business Awards in the ‘Best Business Book’ category. It is also a winner in the Business, Management category at the International Impact Book Awards 2024.

Nitin‘s third book titled Human Edge in the AI Age - completing his trilogy on the transformation trifecta of Digital, Data and AI - was published by Penguin Random House in July 2025. The book – a timely and compelling reflection on the challenges and opportunities for humanity in the AI era – was recognized as an Amazon bestseller even before its release, achieving #1 bestseller position across multiple categories, including Hot New Releases, Artificial Intelligence, Computer Science, Business Communication, Business & Economics, Computing, Internet & Digital Media, Business & Finance and Science, Technology & Medicine. It reached the #8 Amazon Best Seller on the day of the book launch. It also became a Penguin national bestseller within a few days of launch.
