= J. N. Jayashree =

Indian whistleblower

J. N. Jayashree is an Indian whistle blower, a housewife who reported on corruption in Karnataka state and created a wiki to protect her husband, M. N. Vijayakumar, a worker employed by the state. The latter had accused government officials of taking bribes and kickbacks and engaging in "garden-variety pilferage." The wiki was created to generate awareness, Jayashree said she didn't want her husband to end up like Shanmughan Manjunath or Satyendra Dubey, who were found dead after they reported on corruption in a public company and a government department, respectively.
