= Mafia Raj =

Criminal network of government officials, politicians, business executives, and others

Mafia Raj (lit. 'mafia regime') refers to a criminalised nexus (or 'mafia') of corrupt government officials, elected politicians, business interests and other entities (such as law-enforcement authorities, non-governmental organisations, trade unions or criminal organisations).

In India (where the term originated) it can refer to cities, states, government departments, public sector businesses or entire sectors of the economy that are subject to these conditions. Due to the ability of these mafias to operate their illegal activities in a sustained fashion, sometimes openly and with the use of violent intimidation, terms like Goonda Raj ('gangster regime'), Jungle Raj ('jungle regime') and Anarchy are used to refer to the same phenomenon.

In the Indian and Pakistani media, the mafias are usually mentioned by the name of the economic sector in which they are involved. Terms such as coal mafia, timber mafia (sometimes forest mafia), contractor mafia (sometimes road construction mafia or road contract mafia) and land mafia are commonly used.

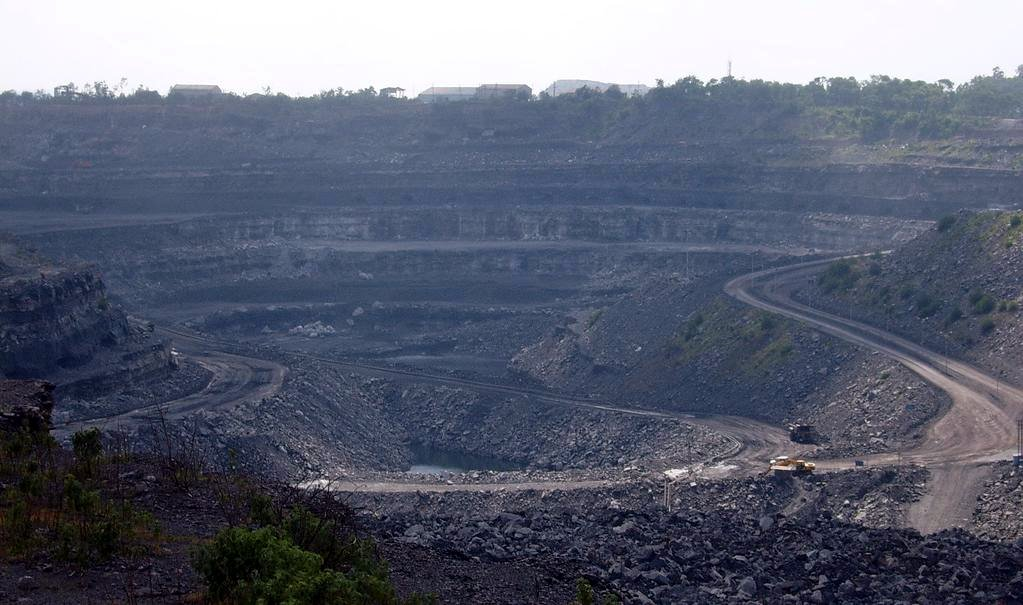
The Dhanbad coal mining complex in India is allegedly dominated by a coal mafia.

The state-owned coal mines of Bihar (now Jharkhand after the division of Bihar state) were among the first areas in India to see the emergence of a sophisticated mafia, beginning with the mining town of Dhanbad. It is alleged that the coal industry's trade union leadership forms the upper echelon of this arrangement and employs caste allegiances to maintain its power. Pilferage and sale of coal on the black market, inflated or fictitious supply expenses, falsified worker contracts and the expropriation and leasing-out of government land have allegedly become routine. A parallel economy has developed with a significant fraction of the local population employed by the mafia in manually transporting the stolen coal for long distances over unpaved roads to illegal mafia warehouses and points of sale.

The coal mafia has had a negative effect on Indian industry, with coal supplies and quality varying erratically. Higher quality coal is sometimes selectively diverted, and missing coal is replaced with stones and boulders in railway cargo wagons. A human corpse has been discovered in a sealed coal wagon.

The 2012 Bollywood film Gangs of Wasseypur is about the coal mafia in the area of Dhanbad. The 2014 Bollywood movie, Gunday, was also loosely based on the coal mafia.

== Timber mafias ==
Protected forest areas in parts of India – such as Jammu and Kashmir, Himachal Pradesh, Karnataka and Jharkhand – are vulnerable to illegal logging by timber mafias that have coopted or intimidated forestry officials, local politicians, businesses and citizenry.

== Contractor mafias ==
Many state-funded construction activities in India, such as road building, are dominated by construction mafias, which are groupings of corrupt public works officials, materials suppliers, politicians and construction contractors. Shoddy construction and material substitution (e.g., mixing sand in cement while submitting expenses for cement) result in roads and highways being dangerous and sometimes simply washed away when India's heavy monsoon season arrives.

In a widely covered case, Satyendra Dubey, a project director with the National Highways Authority of India, was murdered in 2003, allegedly because he had written a letter exposing deep-seated contractor mafia involvement in the construction of a section of the prestigious Golden Quadrilateral project to the prime minister's office. Although a CBI investigative report after the assassination stated that there was no contractor mafia involvement in Dubey's murder, his family and supporters maintained that an attempt at a cover-up was being made.

Attempts have been made to reduce mafia influence by making construction tendering processes more transparent, sometimes by attempting to move them online, so that a complete audit trail of bids and activity is maintained. Construction mafias are alleged to have used their political influence decisively to frustrate many such attempts, for example, in the public works for which the Municipal Corporation of Delhi is responsible.

== Land mafias ==
In cities and villages throughout India, mafias consisting of municipal and other government officials, elected politicians, judicial and law enforcement officials, acquire, develop and sell land in illegal ways for profit. Sometimes, government land or land ostensibly acquired for some legitimate government purpose is then handed over to real estate developers who build commercial and residential properties and sell them in the open market, often with the connivance of administrative and police officials.

In one set of allegations in Karnataka, a lake was filled in and government buildings torn down after illegal transfers to a developer by mafia-connected officials. Eminent domain laws, intended to procure private land at relatively low prices for public benefit or redistribution to poorer people under social justice programs, are abused to pressure landholders to sell land to a government entity, which transfers the land to developers at those low prices, and who in turn sell it back on the market at much higher prices.

According to a Hindustan Times article, the Navruna Chakraborty case in 2012 (closed by the CBI in 2021) involved individuals linked to land-related criminal activities in Bihar. The article reported that the perpetrators were reportedly interested in a piece of land that Navruna’s father intended to sell.

Computerisation of records relating to the classification of tracts and land ownership is a key tool in countering the illegal activities of land mafias, since it creates transparency on all information relating to a given parcel of land. This approach has been effective in Bengaluru, but efforts to extend it elsewhere have sometimes met with strong resistance by land mafias, manifesting itself as bureaucratic inaction.

Focused vigilance in specific areas by government agencies has acted as a deterrent to land mafia activities. For example, the land mafia in the Noida area, on the outskirts of Delhi, was reported to have illegally begun carving out plots for commercial sale on land identified by the Central Zoo Authority of India as the site for India's first Night Safari park. Subsequent to coverage in the press, vigorous legal action by the Greater Noida Authority reportedly led to this mafia alliance backing away from this theft, although it may have shifted its attention to illegally encroaching on land along the Taj Expressway, connecting Delhi and Agra, which is expected to become quite valuable.

== See also ==
- Corruption in India
- Energy law
- Licence Raj
- Police corruption
- Vohra Report
