= V. Kalyanam =

Indian freedom fighter (1922–2021)

- Born: 15 August 1922; Shimla, Punjab, British India
- Died: 4 May 2021 (aged 98); Chennai, India

V. Kalyanam (15 August 1922 – 4 May 2021) was an Indian freedom fighter and was Mahatma Gandhi's personal secretary during the last few years of Gandhi's life (1943–48). He joined the freedom struggle during Quit India Movement in 1942, and then worked with Gandhi till Gandhi's assassination. Kalyanam was just behind Gandhi when Nathuram Godse fired the shots. According to Kalyanam, Gandhi died instantly after being shot and never uttered "Hey Ram" as his last words. He was the first to inform Nehru and Patel about Gandhi's death.

Kalyanam later worked as Edwina Mountbatten's secretary in London. He returned a few years later and then worked for C. Rajagopalachari and Jayaprakash Narayan.

Kalyanam criticized Congress Party for forgetting the legacy of Gandhi. He said Gandhi wanted to dissolve the party which had started becoming corrupt. He even said that Jawaharlal Nehru was responsible for corruption in India.

Kalyanam joined the Aam Aadmi Party's Chennai wing Inauguration in 2014, which was portrayed as if he had joined the party.

He died of age-related ailments on May 4, 2021.
