= Vohra Report =

1993 report on criminalisation of Indian politics

The Vohra (Committee) Report was submitted by the former Indian Home Secretary, N. N. Vohra, in October 1993. It studied the problem of the criminalisation of politics and of the nexus among criminals, politicians and bureaucrats in India.

The report contained several observations made by official agencies on the criminal network which was virtually running a parallel government. It also discussed criminal gangs who enjoyed the patronage of politicians, of all parties, and the protection of government functionaries. It revealed that political leaders had become the leaders of gangs. They were connected to the private illegal militia & corrupt police. Over the years criminals had been elected to local bodies, State Assemblies and Parliament. The unpublished annexures to the Vohra Report were believed to contain highly explosive material.

In 1997, the Supreme Court recommended the appointment of a high level committee to ensure in-depth investigation into the findings of the N N Vohra Committee and to secure prosecution of those involved.

== Excerpts from the report (published parts) ==
"In the first meeting of the Committee (held on 15th July ‘93), I had explained to the Members that Government had established the Committee after seeing the reports of our Intelligence and Investigation agencies on the activities/linkages of the Dawood Ibrahim gang, consequent to the bomb blasts in Bombay in March 1993." (2.1, cf. 1993 Bombay bombings, Dawood Ibrahim)

"In the bigger cities, the main source of income relates to real estate - forcibly occupying lands/buildings, procuring such properties at cheap rates by forcing out the existing occupants/tenants etc. Over time, the money power thus acquired is used for building up contacts with bureaucrats and politicians and expansion of activities with impunity. The money power is used to develop a network of muscle-power which is also used by the politicians during elections." (3.2)

"The nexus between the criminal gangs, police, bureaucracy and politicians has come out clearly in various parts of the country. The existing criminal justice system, which was essentially designed to deal with the individual offences/crimes, is unable to deal with the activities of the Mafia; the provisions of law in regard economic offences are weak (...)" (3.3)

"Director CBI has observed that there are many such cases, as that of mafia boss Iqbal Mirchi where the initial failure has led to the emergence of Mafia giants who have become too big to be tackled." (3.4)

"Like the Director CBI, the DIB has also stated that there has been a rapid spread and growth of criminal gangs, armed senas, drug Mafias, smuggling gangs, drug peddlers and economic lobbies in the country which have, over the years, developed an extensive network of contacts with the bureaucrats/Government functionaries at the local levels, politicians, media persons and strategically located individuals in the non-State sector. Some of these Syndicates also have international linkages, including the foreign intelligence agencies." (6.2)

"The various crime Syndicates Mafia organisations have developed significant muscle and money power and established linkages with governmental functionaries, political leaders and others to be able to operate with impunity" (10.1.ii)

"the various agencies presently in the field take care to essentially focus on their respective charter of duties, dealing with the infringement of laws relating to their organisations and consciously putting aside any information on linkages which they may come across" (11.1)

"In the background of the discussions so far, there does not appear to be need for any further debate on the vital importance of setting up a nodal point to which all existing intelligence and Enforcement agencies (irrespective of the Department under which they are located ) shall promptly pass on any information which they may come across, which relates to the activities of crime Syndicates" (13.1)

== See also ==
- Political corruption
- Rent seeking
