= The Virgins (film) =

- Directed by: Sandeep A. Varma
- Written by: Sandeep A. Varma
- Produced by: Humaramovie
- Starring: Piaa Bajpai; Akshay Oberoi; Divyendu Sharma
- Cinematography: Shanu Singh Rajput
- Edited by: Aarti Bajaj
- Music by: Anuj Danait
- Release date: 30 June 2016
- Running time: 18 minutes
- Country: India
- Language: Hindi

The Virgins is a Hindi short film directed by Sandeep A. Varma starring Divyendu Sharma, Pia Bajpai and Akshay Oberoi. It is a take on the beliefs surrounding virginity in current India.

== Cast ==
- Pia Bajpai
- Akshay Oberoi
- Divyendu Sharma
- Pratik Kothari

== Production ==
=== Filming ===
The filming took place in May 2016 in a small seaside town in Dahanu.

== Reception ==
Fellow industry stars Kalki Koechlin and Imran Khan appreciated Varma and his film at the screening. Khan said, "The film was very enjoyable. It is actually on a very interesting subject. it is on a very relevant and a topical thing. The ones who have got married and the ones who have thought of getting married, I think that they will relate a lot to this film." Koechlin said, "I think it is a very interesting concept, the idea of 'The Virgins', people who are concerned about being a virgin or not being a virgin before marriage, we don't see that often explored in cinemas, so it's nice."
