= Shanmugam Manjunath =

Indian marketing manager

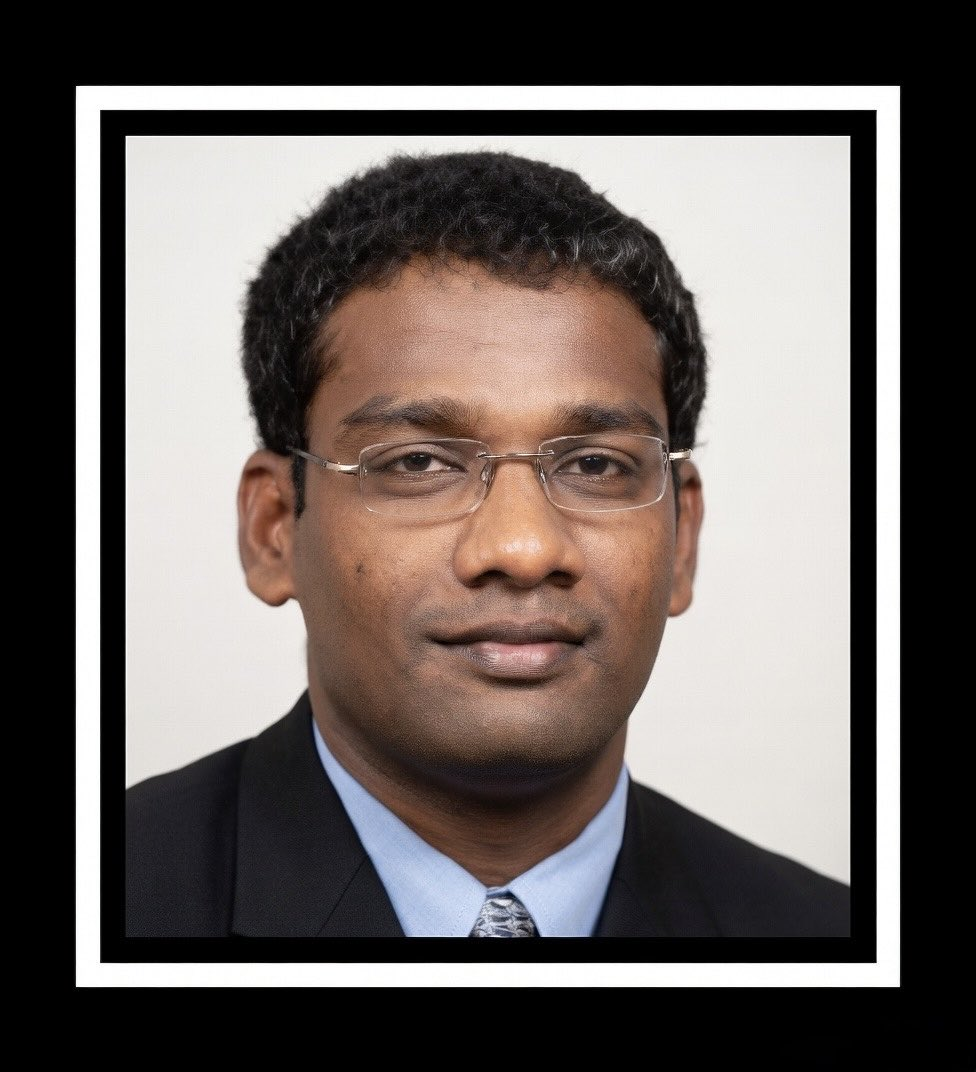
Shanmugam Manjunath

Shanmugam Manjunath (23 February 1978 – 19 November 2005) was a sales officer (grade A officer) for the Indian Oil Corporation who was murdered for sealing a corrupt petrol station in Lakhimpur Kheri, Uttar Pradesh. This incident inspired several students at IIM, IIT and other institutes culminating with the IIM students setting up "The Manjunath Shanmugam Trust".

== Education ==
Manjunath did his initial schooling from Kendriya Vidyalaya, BEML Nagar, Kolar Gold Fields, Karnataka. He finished his 10th in 1993 and 12th std in science stream in 1995 from the same school. Later on he did his Computer Science Engineering degree from Sri Jayachamarajendra College of Engineering, Mysore, and an MBA from Indian Institute of Management Lucknow.

== Opposition to corruption and murder ==
While working for the Indian Oil Corporation in Lucknow, he ordered two petrol pumps at Lakhimpur Kheri sealed for selling adulterated fuel for three months. When the pump started operating again a month later, Manjunath conducted a surprise raid on 19 November 2005.

During his inspection, Manjunath had been shot dead in the town of Gola Gokarannath in Lakhimpur Kheri. At-least 6 bullets were found in his body which was found in the backseat of his own car, driven by two employees of the petrol pump. Both were arrested and the main accused, pump-owner Pawan Kumar ('Monu') Mittal, was held on 23 November along with seven others.

Indian Oil Corporation paid ₹26 lakh (US$27,000) compensation to the family.

== Murder trial ==
Manjunath's death came close on the heels of the assassination of Satyendra Dubey (27 November 1973 – 27 November 2003), suspected to have been murdered for similar reasons (fighting corruption). Following the murder, there was immense media spotlight on the case. The Manjunath Shanmugam Trust was founded by IIM alumni Anjali Mullatti & H. Jaishankar. The Trust was supported by hundreds of alumni across the IIMs; as well as many well wishers; S. Manjunath's batchmates from IIM Lucknow (where he was affectionately called machan) also contributed to it.

=== Sessions court ===
The Manjunath Shanmugam Trust took up the case with determination. The Trustees and volunteers - many were students from the 2007 batch of IIM Lucknow - attended every single hearing at Lakhimpur Kheri. Ms. Kamini Jaiswal, a noted Supreme Court lawyer supported the Trust in fighting the case from the beginning. The Trust lawyer Mr. IB Singh was instrumental. On 24 March 2007, in a record nine months' trial, all eight accused were found guilty by the Lakhimpur Kheri Sessions Court. The main accused, Monu Mittal and 7 accomplices were convicted of murder by Sessions judge, Lakhimpur Kheri.

Petrol pump owner Pawan Kumar Mittal, the main accused in the sensational murder, was sentenced to death by the Sessions Court, while the other seven accused were given life imprisonment on 26 March 2007.

=== High court ===
The convicts challenged the Sessions Court's verdict in Allahabad High Court. On 12 December 2009, Allahabad High Court commuted the death sentence of prime convict Pawan Kumar Mittal to life imprisonment. The high court upheld the life sentence of five others but acquitted two other accused – Harish Misra and Sanjay Awasthi.

=== Supreme court ===
The convicts appealed to the Supreme Court in 2011. Ms. Kamini Jaiswal represented the Manjunath Shanmugam Trust. On 11 March 2015, the Supreme Court dismissed all the convicts' appeals, holding that the prosecution had proved the chain of events, needed for a case of circumstantial evidence. They will continue serving their life sentences.

=== Release of convicts ===
One of the convicts, Shivkesh Giri, alias Lalla Giri, stepped out of the Lakhimpur Kheri district jail on 8 January 2023 after the state ordered his premature release.

== Manjunath Shanmugam Trust ==
A pan IIM initiative, "The Manjunath Shanmugam Trust" was registered on 23 February 2006, Manjunath's birth anniversary. With immediate objectives of fighting the case, the broader agenda is to improve governance in Indian public life. On 19 November 2006, Manjunath's first death anniversary, the Trust launched India's first RTI Act Helpline. The Helpline, launched by Arvind Kejriwal and N.R Narayana Murthy, helped 10,000+ callers to use the RTI Act to fight corruption and governance issues.

== Awards ==
=== Manjunath Shanmugam Integrity Award ===
The Manjunath Shanmugam Integrity Award carries a citation and a Rs. One Lakh Cash Award; to honour those who have reported and worked to rectify systemic corruption. The first Manjunath Shanmugam Integrity Award was awarded on 24 March 2007 to Prof. R.P. Singh, Vice-Chancellor Lucknow University for his extraordinary courage in taking on criminals and politicians to clean up Lucknow University and implement the Lyngdoh Committee recommendations. The award was presented in a public function by chairman and Chief Mentor of Infosys Mr. NR Narayana Murthy.

Krishak Mukti Sangram Samiti president Akhil Gogoi received the prestigious 2nd Shanmugam Manjunath Integrity Award from the Magsaysay awardee Kiran Bedi at a function held on 28 March 2008 at the IIT Delhi Seminar Hall. Mr Gogoi who hails from upper Assam's Golaghat district has been awarded for his fight against corruption. One of the finalists, IAS officer Sri M.N. Vijayakumar, was not allowed to attend the function by his senior, Sudhakar Rao (Husband of former foreign secretary of India Nirupama Rao). This was widely criticised by his wife Jayashree JN and was also brought to the notice of the President of India.

Institute for Research and Documentation in Social Sciences (IRDS) has also been awarding the S Manjunath award for Management for its contributions to the cause of fighting corruption in corporate management.

=== Demands of Padma Shri Award for Manjunath ===
Non-governmental organisations from Lucknow, Institute for Research and Documentation in Social Sciences (IRDS) and National RTI Forum are pursuing the demand of awarding one of the Padma Shri Awards by the Government of India to both Manjunath Shanmugam and Satyendra Dubey, the IIT Kanpur graduate who was murdered in similar circumstances while working for the National Highway Authority of India. They have already submitted a petition to the President and started an online campaign on social networking sites and an online petition, where more than thousand people already joined.

== In popular culture ==
A biopic on Manjunath, titled Manjunath, directed by Sandeep Varma, was released on 9 May 2014. Portions of the film were shot in his almamater IIM, Lucknow campus. Ahead of the release, the trailer of the film was shown at the alumni meet on the IIM-L campus in December 2013. The movie had a special screening on 10 May 2014 for IIM alumni in Singapore as part of the IIMPact 2014 launch event (http://www.iimpactglobal.org).

Famous Indian musician Rabbi Shergill has dedicated one stanza in his song titled 'Bilqis (Jinhe Naaz Hai)' from album Avengi Ja Nahin to Shanmughan Manjunath. This song is a dedication to all those who died in vain or while supporting some cause (anti-corruption).

On 19 November 2015, three students of IIM Lucknow attempted Limca Book of Records by creating India's largest Rubik's Cube mosaic in honour of Manjunath Shanmugam, alumnus of IIM Lucknow. Three students of IIM Lucknow, Manish Meshram, Panchu Ghorui and Tanuj Lodhi initiated the idea on Manjunath's 10th death anniversary. They used 23,278 Rubik's cubes to build the mosaic representing Manjunath's birthday (23 February 1978). Over 150 students volunteered for the record attempt. The mosaic was kept for display for three days. The record attempt allowed students to spread the idea of honesty and integrity across the boundaries and inspire young minds. IIM Lucknow's band 3.4 presented inspirational song dedicated to Manjunath, The event was supported by IIM Lucknow's alumni community.

== See also ==
- Satyendra Dubey: Assassinated in November 2003 for whistle-blowing on the criminal nexus in highway construction in Bihar.
- Whistleblower J. N. Jayashree
