= Narendra Kumar (police officer) =

Indian police officer (1979–2012)

- Born: 1979
- Died: 2012 (aged 32–33)
- Cause of death: Murder
- Education: Aligarh Muslim University
- Employer: Indian Police Service

Narendra Kumar (1979–2012) was an Indian Police Service officer.

== Early life ==
Narendra Kumar was born in year 1979. He did his master's degree in Economics from Aligarh Muslim University before deciding to try for civil services examination. His Father Keshav Dev is a sub-inspector posted in Aligarh. His Father in Law S.P. Singh works for Delhi Police.

== Career ==
Narendra Kumar joined IPS in 2009, he was posted in Bihar and Ujjain before joining office in Morena, Madhya Pradesh in early 2012. He was posted in Morena in Madhya Pradesh and was killed allegedly by members of the sand mining mafia in March 2012.

== Murder ==
Murder of a senior Indian police official by the mining mafia created a debate on Corruption in India. Several activists including Anna Hazare were protesting against the incident. CBI probe was ordered by the Indian central government in the issue. He was run over by tractor carrying illegally mined stones after he tried to stop it. Kumar's wife, Madhurani Tewatia is an Indian Administrative Service officer posted in Gwalior, and was on maternity leave at the time of Kumar's death.

== See also ==
- Illegal mining in India
- Corruption in India
- Indian Administrative Service
