= Indian Institute of Management Lucknow =

Public business school in Lucknow, Uttar Pradesh

- Motto: Suprabhande Rashtra Samriddhi
- Motto in English: Better management towards better nation
- Type: Public business school
- Established: 1984; 42 years ago
- Accreditation: Double accreditation; AACSB; AMBA
- Endowment: ₹49,898,050 (US$520,000) (2023)
- Budget: ₹1,687,028,481 (US$18 million) (2023)
- Chairman: Natarajan Chandrasekaran
- Director: Prof. MP Gupta
- Academic staff: 97
- Students: 1,153
- Postgraduates: 995
- Doctoral students: 158
- Location: Lucknow, Uttar Pradesh, India; 26°56′14.55″N 80°53′57.74″E
- Campus: 200; Urban, 200 acres (0.81 km^{2})
- Website: www.iiml.ac.in

The Indian Institute of Management Lucknow (IIM Lucknow or IIML) is a public business school in Lucknow, Uttar Pradesh, India. Established in 1984, it is the fourth of the Indian Institutes of Management and was declared an Institute of National Importance under the Indian Institutes of Management Act, 2017.

The institute was established by the Government of India. In 2005 it opened a second campus at Noida for executive education, becoming the first IIM to do so. It offers a two-year Master of Business Administration along with executive and doctoral programmes. Admission to the flagship MBA is through the Common Admission Test.

The institute is on a 200-acre site in the northern outskirts of Lucknow. It also has a second campus on a 20-acre site at Noida exclusively for one year full-time MBA program (IPMX), Two-year PGP in Sustainable Management and Two-year PGP for working executive and executive education. The admission for the two-year PGP and fellowship programmes is done through Common Admission Test (CAT), while GMAT score is used for International Programme in Management for Executives, a one-year full-time residential programme equivalent to an MBA program, while admission to the Two-year PGP for working executive program is done based on GMAT score or a competitive written examination conducted by IIM Lucknow. The shortlisted candidates based on GMAT or the written examination go through the Writing Ability Test and Personal Interview (WAT & PI) to get final selection. The programs are accredited by the global accreditation body AMBA, EQUIS and AACSB. The institute, therefore, has a triple crown accreditation. The institute has tie-ups with 24 leading B-schools across the world for student exchange. A number of b-competitions, cultural and sports events are organised by various clubs, academic interest groups and committees throughout the year.

== History ==
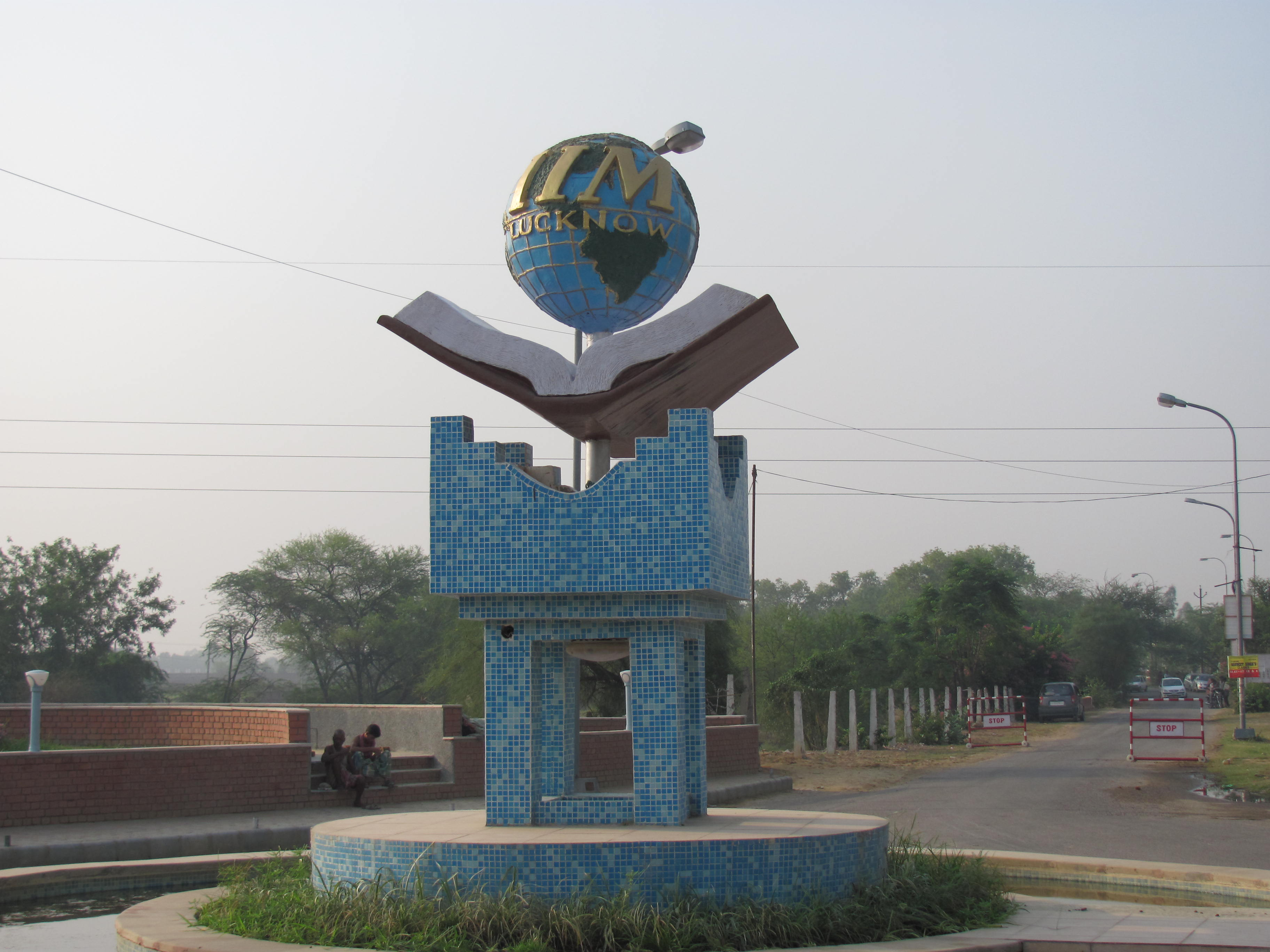
The entrance: sculpture of logo of the institute

IIM Lucknow was established in 1984 and is currently a centrally funded institution. It is the fourth Indian Institute of Management to be established in India (after IIM Calcutta, IIM Ahmedabad, and IIM Bangalore). Noted academic Ishwar Dayal played a significant role in setting up the institution; he served as the founding director of IIM Lucknow for four years. Industrialist Hari Shankar Singhania, who took over as the chairman of Board of Governors in 1992, served until 2007.

The Post Graduate Programme (PGP) was started in 1985–86 with 30 students. When the institute was established, classes were held in rented rooms at Butler Palace and subsequently moved to Giri Institute of Developmental Studies. The current campus was built in 1992 in the outskirts of Lucknow.

Links were made with three foreign universities in 2001 to start the student exchange program. The Agribusiness Course was started in 2004 with 13 students.

In 2005, IIM Lucknow established a second campus at Noida near Delhi. The Noida campus was established exclusively for executive education. Additionally, in 2015, PGP Sustainable Management (PGP-SM) Program was started from the Noida Campus. IIM Lucknow is the first IIM in the country to start an additional campus.

== Campuses ==
IIM Lucknow main campus spans 200 acres (81 ha) and is in Prabandh Nagar on the outskirts of Lucknow, Uttar Pradesh, India. It is located 16 kilometres (9.9 mi) away from Lucknow railway station and 25 kilometres (16 mi) away from Lucknow Airport. IIM Lucknow also has a city office at Aliganj.

IIM-Lucknow's Noida Campus is spread over 20 acres in Sector-62, NOIDA. PGPSM (Sustainable Management) and IPMX courses are main highlight of the campus.

=== Academic infrastructure ===
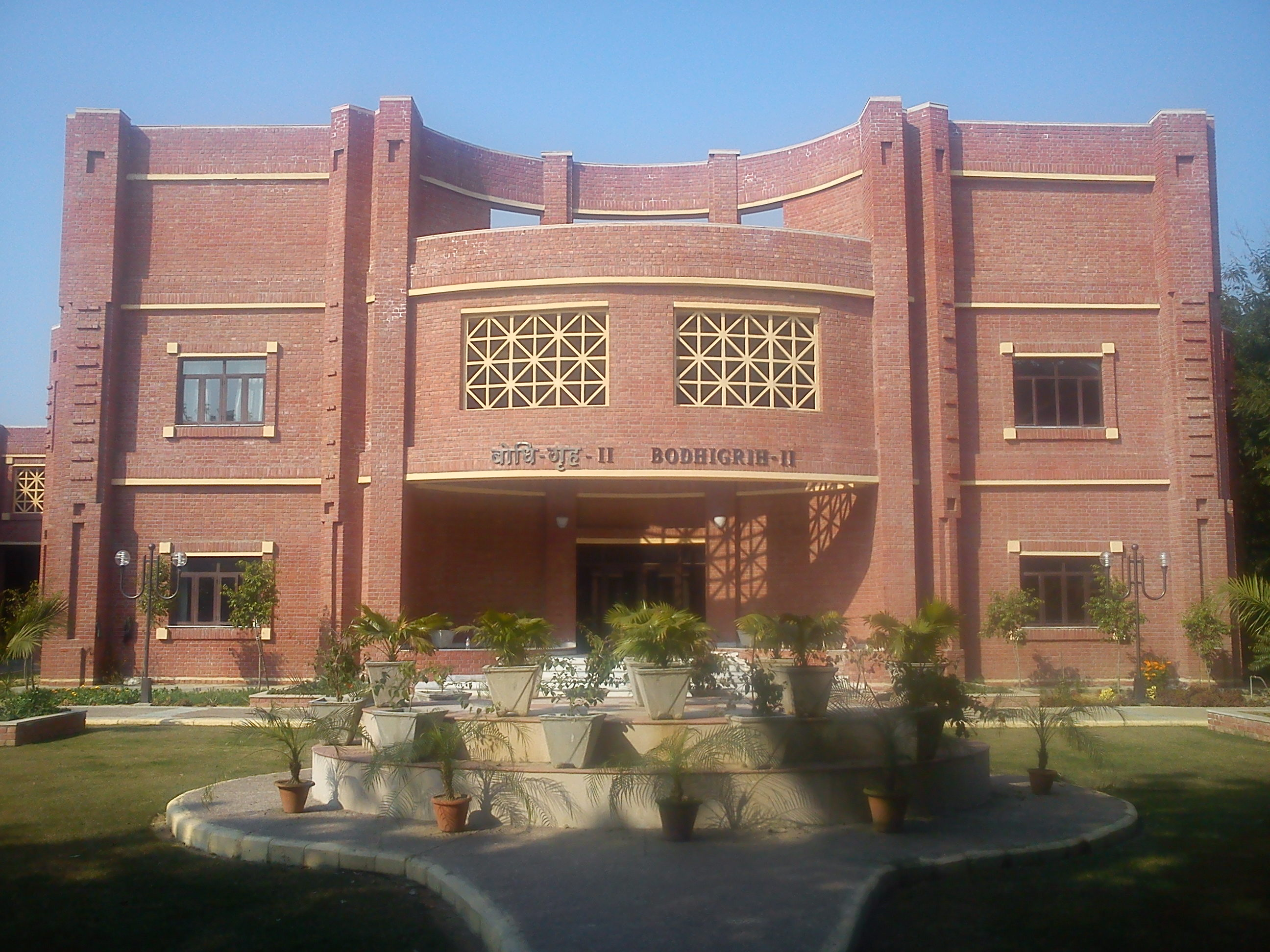
Bodhigrih – the Academic Block, that houses classrooms and test halls

The academic buildings are constructed in medieval Indian architectural style with red brick wall texture. All the major buildings in the campus are named in Sanskrit symbolising the activities conducted in them. The academic blocks (Bodhigrih-I and II) houses classrooms and seminar halls. The Faculty block (Chintan) houses faculty rooms and Fellowship classrooms. The Library (Gyanodaya) spanning 30,000 sq ft has five reading halls with a seating capacity for 250 people. The library houses a collection of 40,000 books, 500 periodicals and online subscription to 1600 e-journals and 34 e-databases. The library building houses the computer centre, audio visual lab, Enterprise Resource Planning lab and a videoconferencing hall. The 15,000 sq ft computer centre has a fibre optic backbone network and provides wireless connectivity to all the buildings in the campus.

The Management Development Block (Manthan) catering to the short-term executive programs has exclusive library, computer centre and guest house (Patanjali) for participants. The Centre for Food and Agribusiness Management undertakes agribusiness research and consultancy projects and offers the Agribusiness Management course. The institute has an incubation centre (Abhiyan) for supporting the entrepreneurial plans of its students and alumni.

=== Social infrastructure ===
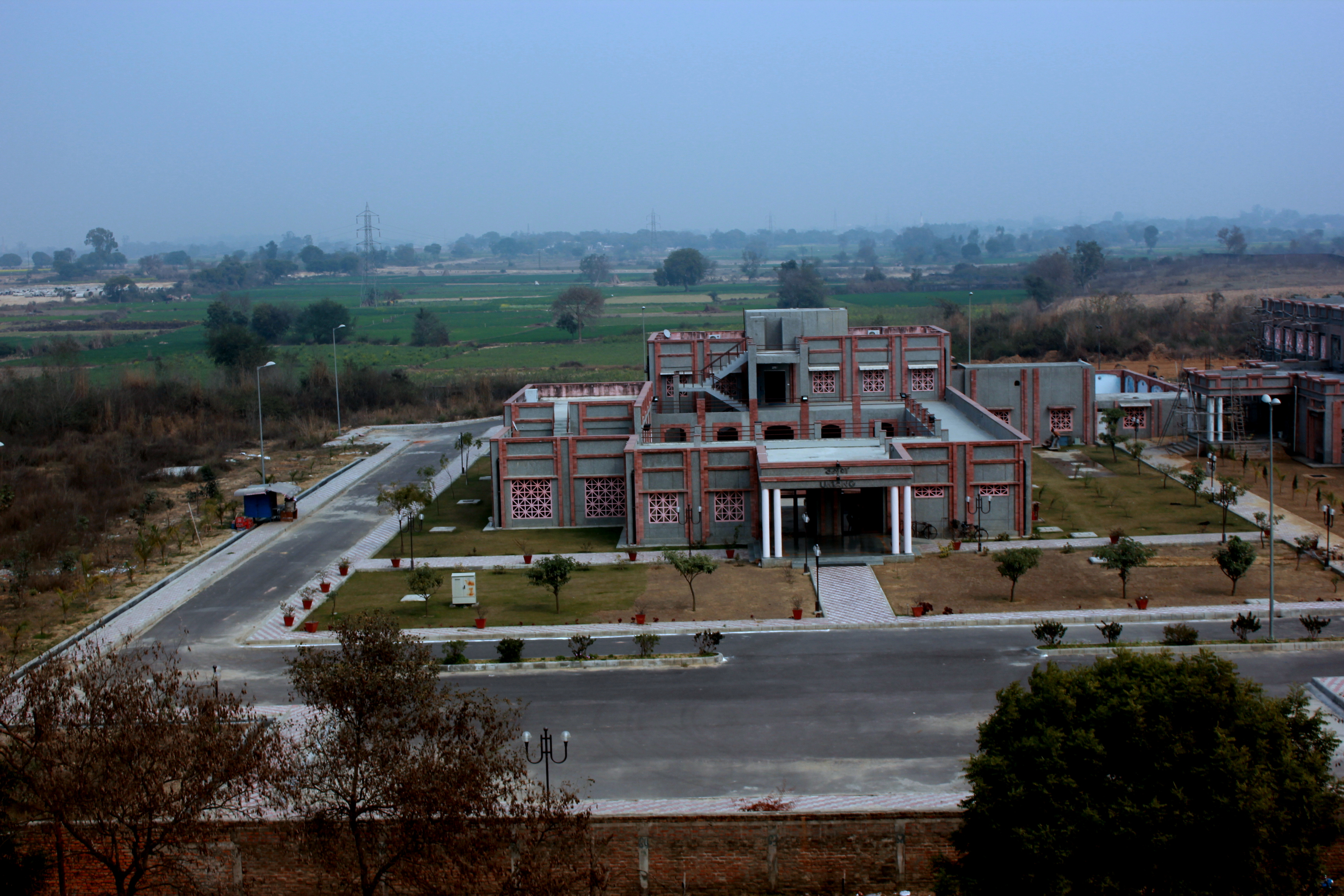
Umang – the fitness and recreation centre

Fully residential, the institute provides housing to its students, faculty and research scholars.

While the campus has separate sports fields for football, cricket, basketball, volleyball, tennis, and badminton, most of the hostels have their own table tennis and badminton courts. A fitness and recreation centre (Umang) was set up in 2010, which houses a gymnasium, swimming pool, squash, and billiards. The multipurpose utility hall (Samanjasya) hosts most of the cultural activities on the campus.

The campus has a health centre with residential and visiting doctors available around the clock. The centre has an ambulance to reach associated hospitals.

The two guest houses Chanakya and Patanjali have 128 serviced rooms. The campus has a student activities complex with two banks, a medical shop, a travel agency, a supermarket, a post office, a saloon, a coffee shop, an ice cream parlour, and three restaurants. A Central school (Kendriya Vidyalaya) was established opposite the campus as a community school.

=== Environmental responsibility ===
Tree plantation campaign is undertaken every year on the foundation day and the campus, which was started in barren lands, has been converted into an ecosystem consisting of peacocks, monitor lizards, snakes, porcupines, monkeys, Great Indian horned owl and other birds. The main campus consists of open lawns and tree lined pathways. Rediff listed IIM Lucknow as one of the beautiful B-school campuses in India.

== Organisation ==
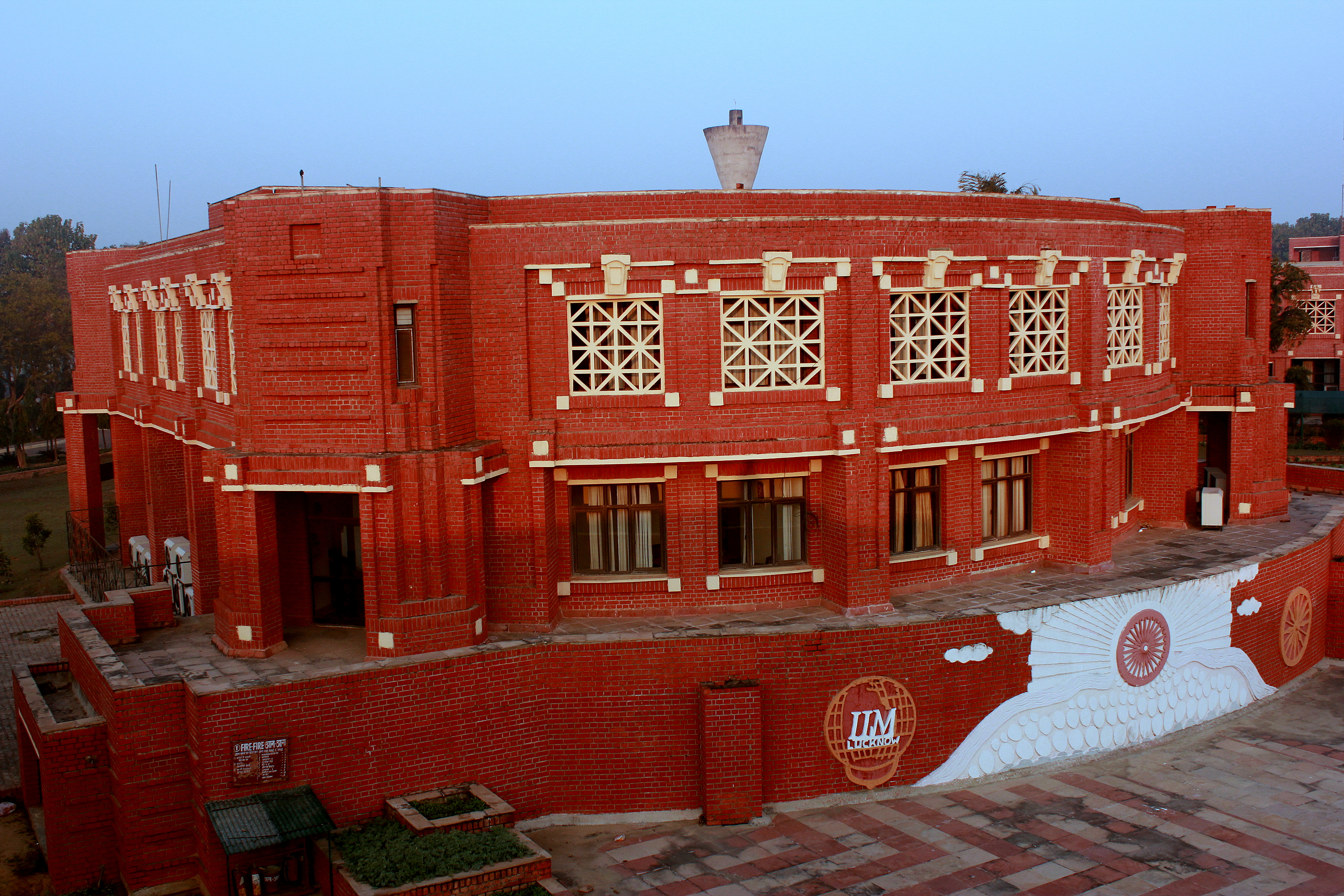
Samadhan – the Administrative Block

=== Governance ===
IIM Lucknow is an autonomous institution established as a registered society under the Union Ministry of Human Resource Development, Govt. of India. The IIM Council acts as an overseeing body to facilitate coordination among the IIMs.

The Board of Governors of IIM Lucknow is chaired by Natarajan Chandrasekaran, chairman of Tata Sons. The board consists of 10 industrialists, four Government representatives and three academics in addition to the director and two deans of the institution.

=== Administration ===
The director of IIM Lucknow, the head of the institution, is selected and appointed by the Appointments Committee of the Cabinet of Ministry of Human Resource Development. The institute has three separate deans for academic affairs, planning and development, and Noida campus. Each of the academic programmes is overseen by a faculty chairperson.

The non-academic functions such as Placements, Corporate and Media Relations, Alumni affairs, Admissions and Student affairs are chaired by faculty and assisted by student committees. Office administration is carried out without the involvement of faculty and is headed by the Chief Administrative Officer. The elected body of the students' council coordinates student activities in the campus.

=== Controversy on director appointments ===
MHRD issued a letter in September 2014 (DO 4/4/2013-TS.V)) addressed to Jamshed J Irani, chairman, board of governors, IIM-L. It reads: "Competent authority have directed to assign additional charge of director IIM-L to Prof Srivastava for a period of six months with effect from 09-09-2014 or till appointment of regular director or until further order, whichever is earliest."

The institute did not execute the order and incumbent director Devi Singh who completed his six months of extension period, on 8 September did not leave office even after receiving the letter. As a result, there was confusion at IIM-L campus for almost a week. The allegations against Devi Singh, who served two term as director of IIM-L, ranges from nepotism to mismanagement of accounts. The Central Vigilance Commission also asked the HRD ministry to 're investigate' allegations of corruption against Devi Singh.

In a letter to the higher education secretary, CVC secretary KS Ramasubban has asked the ministry as to why the case against Singh is being closed when specific allegations have not been answered. The CVC has taken exception to the fact that the case is being closed on the basis of an "emotional reply" by Singh. CVC sources said the ministry had taken Singh's reply as final. "Without investigation how can general comments be taken as the final word?" a CVC official asked. CVC sources also said that the institute's Board of Governors had rejected allegations against Singh. "This is not how an investigation is conducted," the CVC official said, adding that the HRD ministry was to be blamed for not following the procedure.

== Academics ==
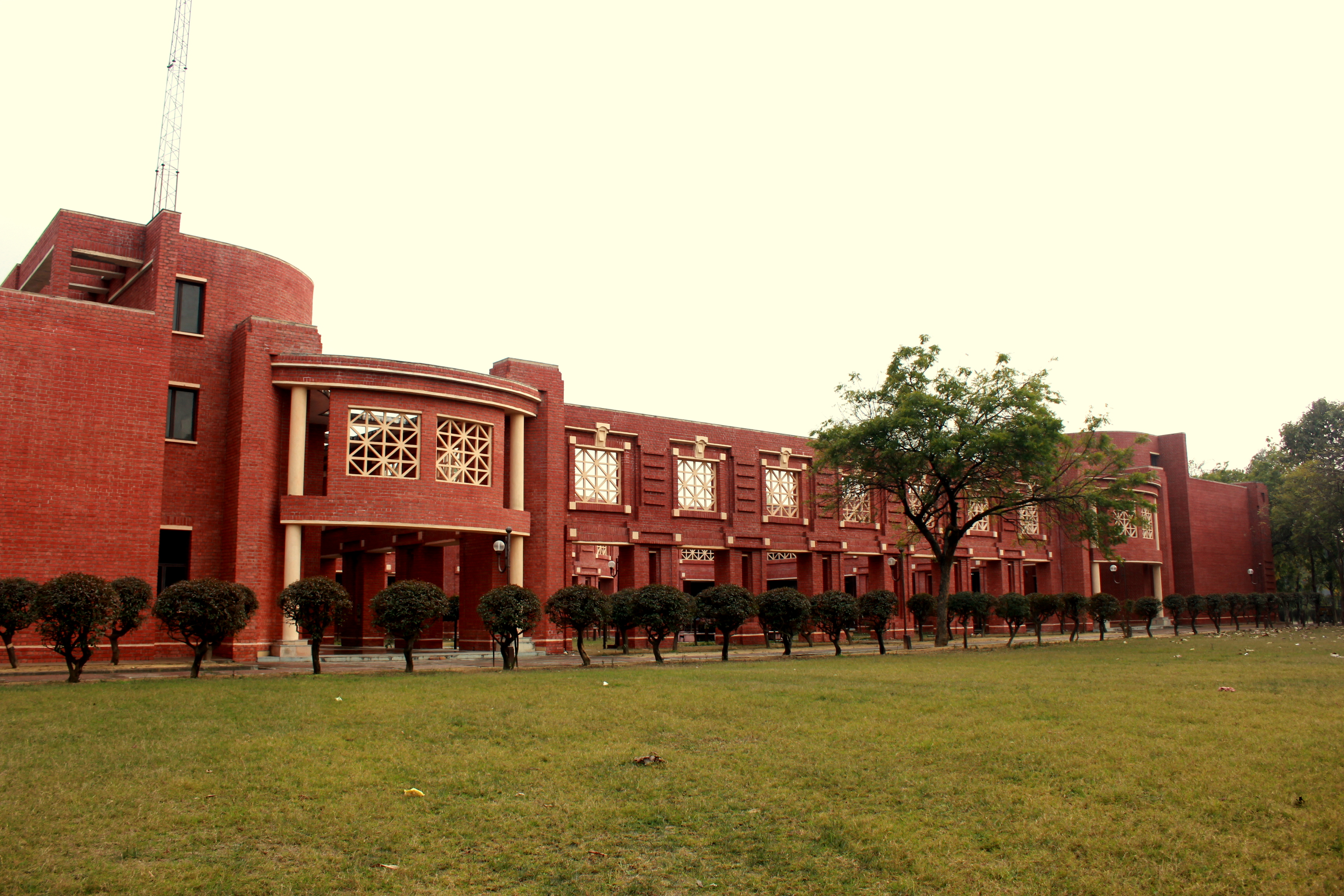
Chintan – the Faculty Block, which houses 80 faculty chambers

IIM Lucknow conducts regular two-year diploma program in management, one-year MBA program for Executives (fully residential), Two year MBA program for working executives (partly residential), fellowship program and short-term MDP and executive programs. The management programmes of IIM Lucknow are accredited by London-based AMBA association.

=== Post graduate education ===
==== Structure ====
IIM Lucknow offers master's degrees. The postgraduate programmes in Management (MBA), Agribusiness Management (MBA-ABM), and Sustainable Management (MBA-SM) are full-time residential masters courses. These are two-year programs, with the first year stretching from June to March in three ten-week trimesters, after which students undergo a two-month summer internship with a company or organisation. The specialisations offered in the second year are finance, marketing, operations, human resources, systems, strategy and economics — while the PGPABM course students specialise in agribusiness. Course of independent study and dissertation are available based on merit.

As a part of student exchange programs, students spend a three-month term in a foreign university in October to December in their second year. Every year around 85-90 students of IIM Lucknow are selected for the exchange programs based on merit, while around 30+ foreign students come to IIM Lucknow.

The Dual Degree Program, offered in association with the ESCP Europe business school in France, awards degrees from both institutes after students spend a year in each. About four or five students are selected each year for the program. Students, after completing two trimesters (July–September and October–December) at IIM Lucknow, spend two semesters (January–May and September–December) at ESCP Europe's Paris campus and return to IIM Lucknow to complete the final term from January to March.

==== Methodology ====
The courses are taught under 11 diverse disciplines of Business Environment, Communication, Decision Sciences, Finance and Accounting, Marketing, Human Resource Management, Operations Management, Information Technology and Systems, Strategic Management, Agribusiness Management and Legal Management. Students are trained in management using lectures, case studies, projects, workshops, management games and roleplays under a rigorous syllabus. They are evaluated based on examinations, projects, quizzes, presentations, and class participation under a relative grading system. Academic learning is supplemented by live projects, management competitions, guest lectures, and interactions with alumni and industry leaders organised by committees. Students get a chance to provide consultancy to companies and get paid.

=== Post Graduate Programme for Executives ===
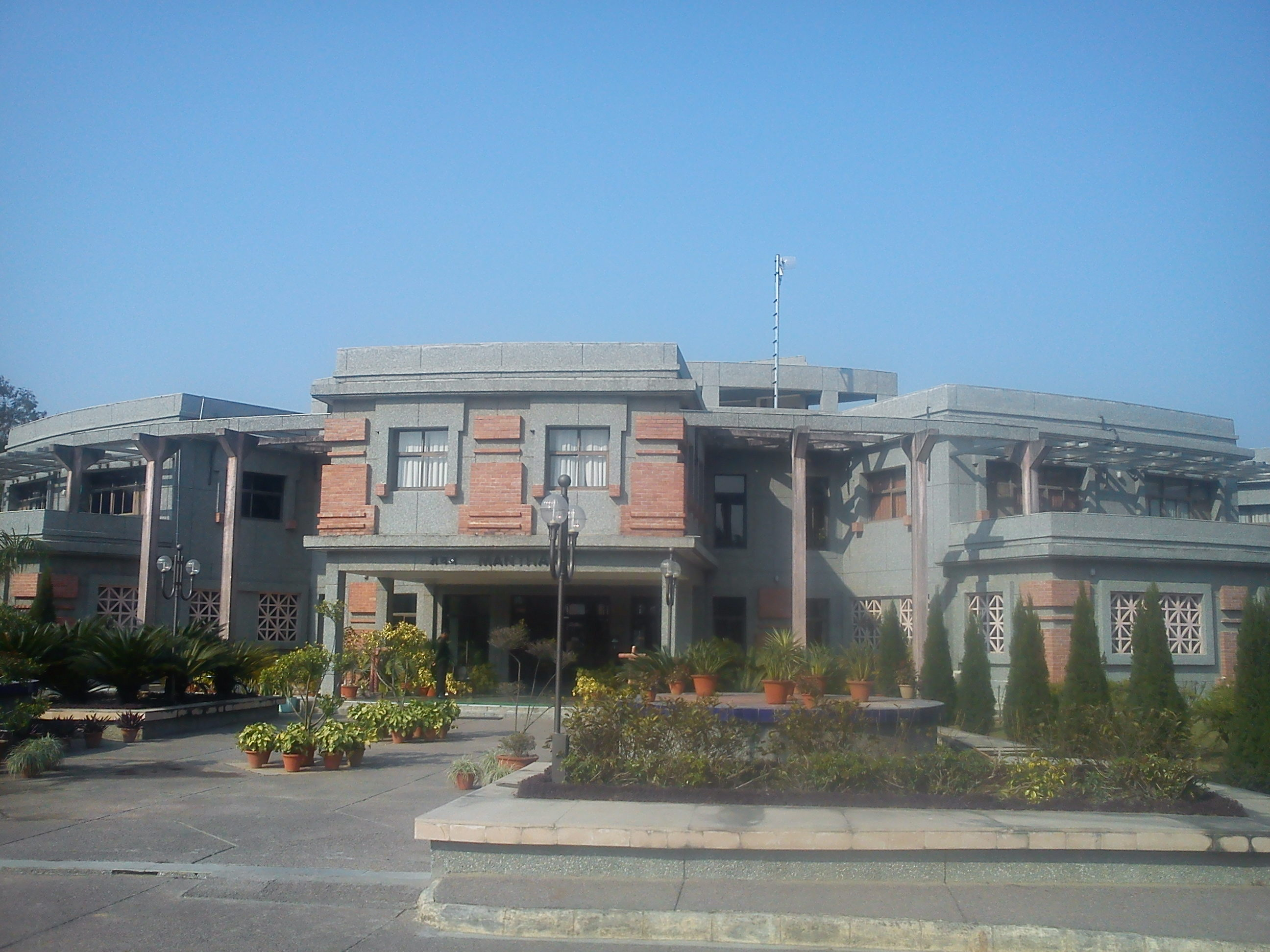
Manthan – the MDP Block, where most of the executive programs are conducted

The International Programme in Management for Executives (IPMX) is a one-year, full-time MBA programme for executives, offered at IIM Lucknow's Noida campus. It only admits candidates with a minimum of five years professional experience. The course consists of four 10-week terms including a term spent at a partner university and a term spent in Lucknow campus.

The Post Graduate Programme in Management for Working Executives (PGPM-WE), also called Working Managers Programme (WMP), offered at the Noida campus, is an executive MBA programme designed for working executives having a minimum of three years professional experience. It consists of seven terms that stretches for 21 months. It has an International Module also initiated from 2017, students will visit one of the top university in Europe as a part of this exchange program, they will have a 1 credit subject being taught there.

Management Development Programmes (MDP) are tailor made programs to train executives in specific industry, government, and non-governmental organisations. These programs, which typically last three to five days, are customised by subject or target group. Around 50 to 60 programs are conducted every year. A one-year General Management program is offered through virtual classroom. As a combined initiative with the Ministry of Defence, a six-month General Management Programme is conducted for Defence officers to assist their career transition to the corporate sector. In October 2019, IIM Lucknow in collaboration with WileyNXT has introduced a six-month program in business and data analytics.

=== Fellow Programme in Management ===
Fellow Programme in Management (FPM) is a research-oriented Doctor of Business Administration programme in various domains of management sciences. This programme was started in 2000. Candidates with master's degrees in appropriate discipline or engineering undergraduate degree holders are eligible for admissions. Any professional qualification holder such as CA, ICWA and CS with a minimum 55% aggregate marks can also apply. While the mandatory pgp-level course work is undertaken in the first year and doctoral level specialisation courses in the second year, the research work starts in the beginning of the third year after a comprehensive examination. Students who have completed MBA from any of the IIMs are admitted directly to the second year. The specialisations offered are Agribusiness management, Decision Sciences, Economics, Finance and Accounting, Human Resources Management, Information Technology and Systems, Marketing Management, Operations Management and Strategic Management. The Agribusiness Management area for FPM is only offered by IIM Ahmadabad apart from IIM Lucknow. The institute pays a liberal monthly stipend to FPM scholars apart from several other research grants. Also the accommodation facility is provided free of cost. Admission in Fellow program is through CAT, GATE, UGC/CSIR/ICAR-JRF/SRF or GMAT/GRE score and other secondary area specific parameters based shortlisting, followed by rigorous interview process.

IIM Lucknow also has an EFPM (Executive DBA) for working executives. The admission process for EFPM is separate from FPM.

=== Rankings ===
Institute rankings

Business – international
- QS (MBA) (2023): 151-200
- QS (MBA) (2024): 151-200
- QS (MBA-Asia) (2023): 33
- QS (MBA-Asia) (2024): 30

Business/Management – India
- NIRF (2022): 6
- NIRF (2023): 6
- NIRF (2024): 7
- Business Today (2022): 4
- Business Today (2023): 4

The National Institutional Ranking Framework (NIRF) ranked it fifth among management colleges in 2025. It was ranked fourth by Business Today's "India's Top Five B-Schools Yearly Ranking In 2022".

=== Admission ===
Admission to the post graduate programs and fellowship program is done through the Common Admission Test (CAT), which is jointly conducted by the IIMs in the month of November every year. Applications are shortlisted based on CAT scores, scholastic achievement and work experience. The weightage given for each of these components varies each year. The candidates are called for group discussions and personal interviews, conducted in cities in India in the months of February and March. The final selection is based upon the performance in CAT, scholastic achievement, work experience, performance in group discussion, and personal interview. Admissions to the IPMX program are done based on GMAT score, work profile and personal interview. Admission to the PGPM-WE (WMP) program are done based on GMAT score or a competitive written examination conducted by IIM Lucknow. The short listed candidates based on GMAT or the written examination go through Writing Ability Test and Personal Interview (WAT & PI) to get final selection.

== Social responsibilities ==
IIM Lucknow has been involved in many social initiatives in collaboration with NGOs. A separate committee "Bhavishya" was formed to carry out these initiatives. As a part of adult literacy campaign, all the workers and labourers in the campus were taught to read and write. Evening school and career guidance are provided for the underprivileged students of the neighboring villages. A T20 cricket league tournament called as Harmony Cup is conducted every year with 30 teams involving 250 students. The funds raised from this event is used for social initiatives such as infrastructure development at village schools and orphanages, medical camp, employee welfare and sponsor for education of underprivileged school children.

The institute offers short term MDP programs on environmental management and carbon markets. The Centre of Excellence for Business Sustainability was set up in 2011 that conducts training programs and workshops on business sustainability. The competition Yajna is held in collaboration with many NGOs across India, where students present solutions for issues faced by the NGOs.

== Student life ==
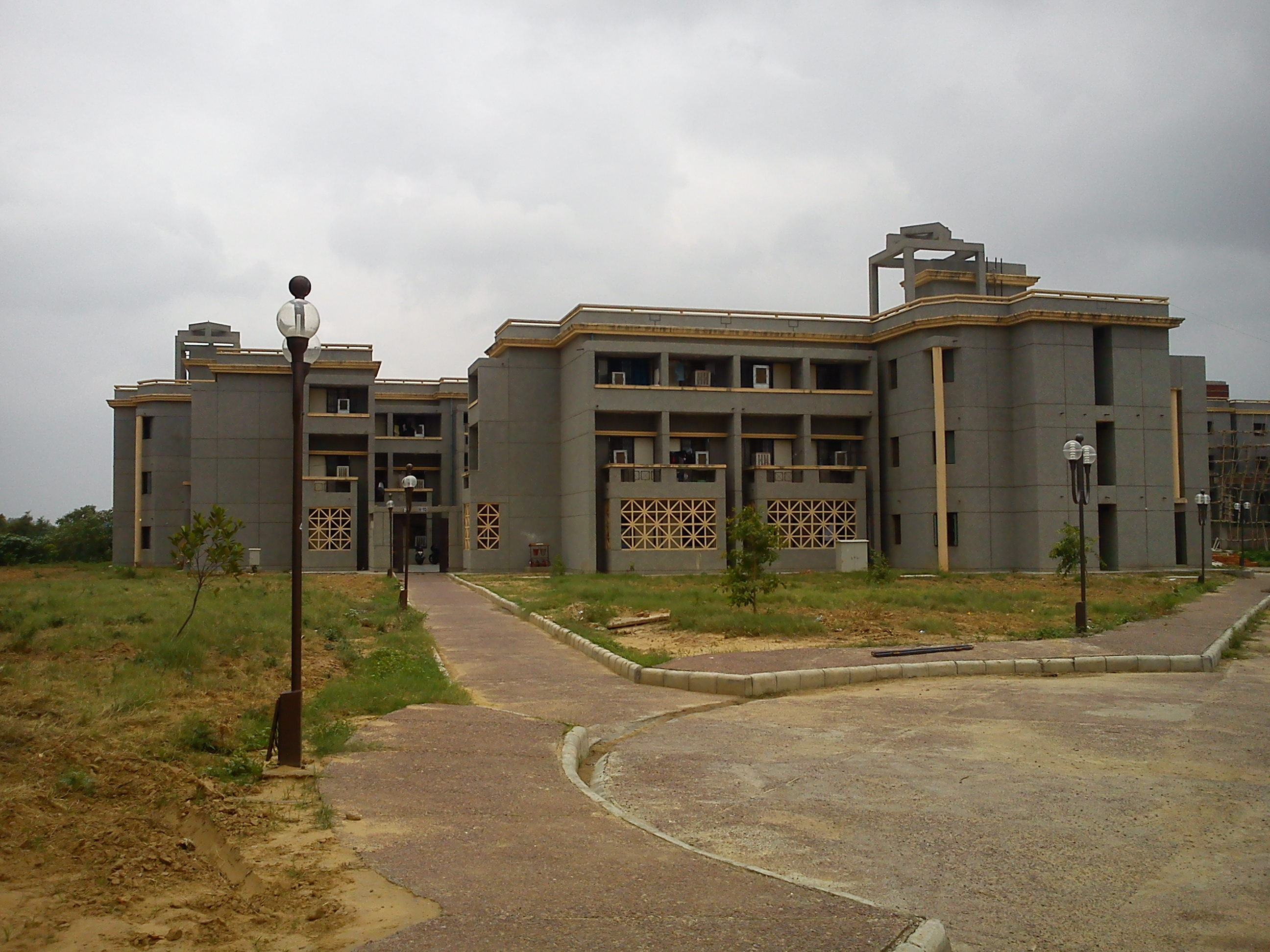
Hostel 15, one of the student hostels

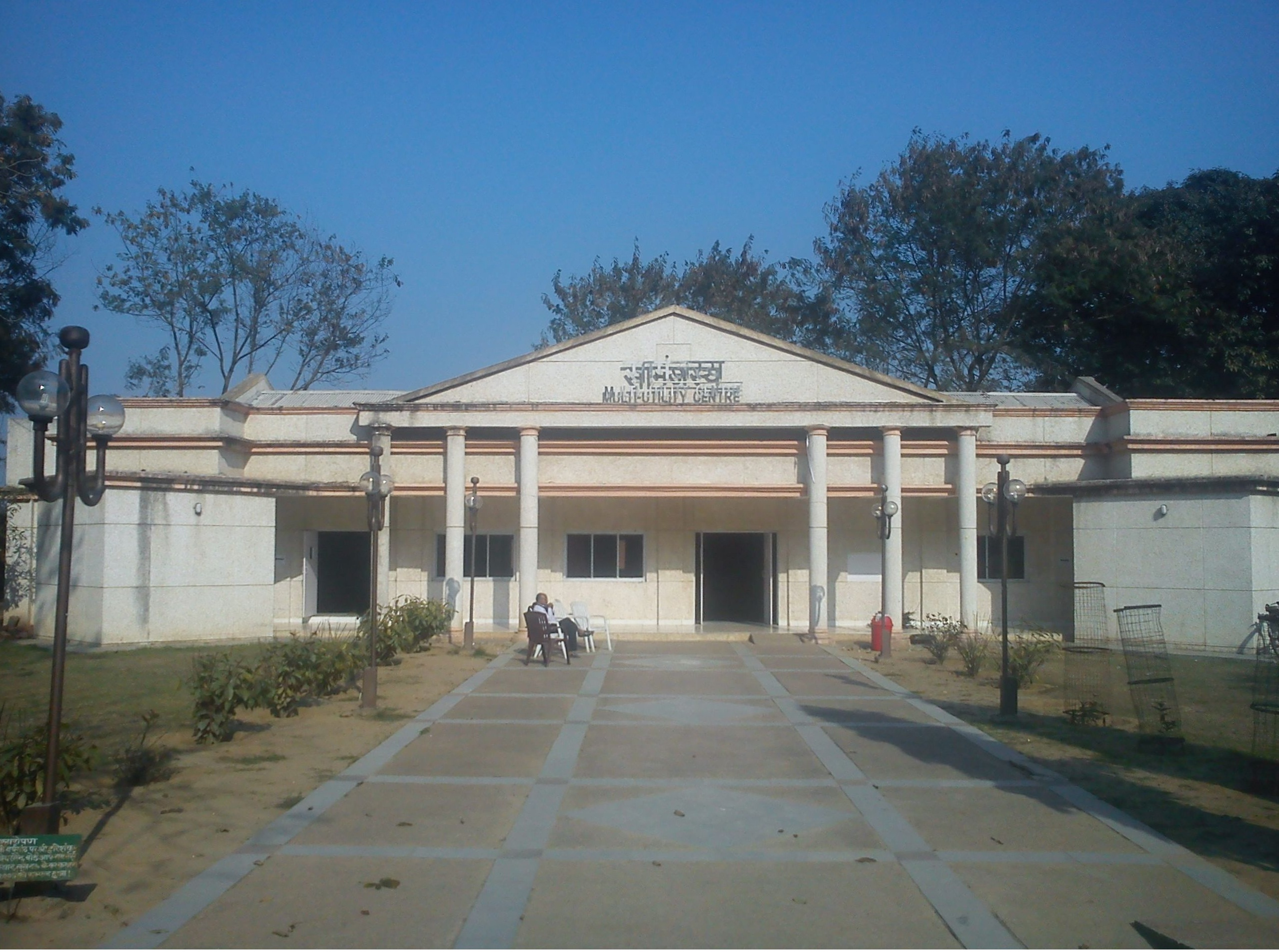
Samanjasya- The multiutility centre, which hosts most of the cultural events

The Media and Communication Cell (MCC) serves as a communications liaison between the institute and the external world. Team Synapse, a student committee, develops and maintains IT applications for the institute community. Biztech, the product management and analytics cell of IIM Lucknow organizes multiple events in the field of Product Management, Analytics, and other technology-related fields. It also hosts CoLAB Talk series in collaboration with product management clubs of IIM Ahmedabad, IIM Bangalore, and IIM Calcutta. "Manfest-Varchasva" is IIM Lucknow's annual management, sports and cultural festival held in November. The three-day event hosts many management contests, leadership summits, and other inter college quizzes and sports and cultural competitions. Samvit, the annual leadership summit of IIM Lucknow witnesses some of the financial leaders and economists of the country with whom students get an opportunity to interact.

"Bhukkad" and "Gossip and Bite" (popularly known as "G&B") are two student run food ventures in the campus and are passed on to the next cohort every year. The Entrepreneurship Cell conducts a competition called "Bizness", where all participants are given a seed capital of ₹ 2000 to run any business in the campus for two days and earn profits. The student committee "Credence Capital" runs a mutual fund, in which other students of the batch can invest. The Mess (Annapoorna) is entirely run and managed by students, with the infrastructure provided by the institute and is continuously ranked the best mess among that of all IIMs.

A classical cultural night "Aarohan" is organised by the IIM Lucknow chapter of SPIC MACAY in the month of August. It showcases live shows of classical arts including carnatic, Hindustani, folk, instrumental and classical Indian dances. The institute's dance club "Random Walk" organises dance workshops regularly and performs stage shows during major festivals. The dramatics club "Abhivyakti" performs stage plays and street plays in Hindi and English. Two intracollege events, Camaraderie and Sangram are held every year during the months of October or November. Camaraderie is the annual cultural meet and Sangram is the annual sports meet. The institute sports team participates in most of the popular college sports meets including the Inter-IIM Meet (Sangharsh) held during January every year. The last edition of Sangharsh was hosted by IIM Lucknow in January 2019 and IIM Lucknow emerged as the overall champion. The next edition of Sangharsh will be hosted by IIM Calcutta in January 2023.

== Notable alumni ==
- K. Annamalai, ex-IPS officer and former State President of the BJP in Tamil Nadu
- Gaurav Aggarwal, IAS
- Gayatri Iyer, Indian playback singer
- Nitin Seth, Bestselling author; Co-founder and CEO Incedo Inc.
- Shailesh Jejurikar, CEO of Procter & Gamble
- Rajdeep Grewal, Townsend Family Distinguished Professor of Marketing at Kenan-Flagler Business School, University of North Carolina at Chapel Hill
- Shanmughan Manjunath, IOC Manager, who was murdered for opposing Corruption
- Suhail Sameer, CEO, Bharatpe
