= Liberalism in India =

The history of liberalism in India goes back to the period of East India Company rule, during which reforms began to be introduced to the governance of India.

The early 19th century saw a slate of liberal reforms spearheaded by Governors-General Lord William Bentinck and Sir Charles Metcalfe, and education reformer Thomas Babington Macaulay. These included the establishment of press freedom as government policy, economic liberalisation and the widespread introduction of English-language education. Liberals were cognisant that Lord Bentinck's desire to reduce barriers to Indians working in the civil service would lead to self-government; Lord Bentinck also desired the establishment of legal equality.

At the end of 19th century, Gladstonian liberals inducted Indians from the elite class into new representative institutions, thereby providing a framework for later self-rule, which became a reality by 1947.

Three strands of liberalism have manifested in India- Colonial (eg: Charles Cornwallis, Thomas Babington Macaulay), Nationalist (eg: Rammohan Roy, Surendranath Banerjee), Radical (Jyotirao Phule, B. R. Ambedkar).

== History ==
=== Rise of liberalism ===
Prominent ideas of classical liberalism emerged in United Kingdom at the wane of the 18th century. These began as primarily leftist schools of thought, including, but not limited to, concepts such as individualism, liberty, and egalitarianism. Simultaneously, British India underwent a similar chrysalis. The effects of classical liberalism in India introduced many Western practices, philosophical doctrines, and political ideologies to the nation.

Governor Generals of the British East India Company Warren Hastings and Charles Cornwallis instituted numerous changes over their rules. Notably, Cornwallis instituted the Cornwallis Code in 1793, a code of law influenced by Hindu and Muslim legal frameworks. The code placed the British at the top of a system regarding caste and religion that was present in India at the time. This marked the beginning of more than a century of classical liberalism in British India

Scottish writer James Mill gained prominence among the British around this time. Generally regarded as a utilitarian imperialist influenced by classical liberalism, his most successful work was A History of British India, published in 1817. Mill divided Indian history into three significant eras: Hindu (ancient), Muslim (medieval), and British (modern). Mill’s reductionist philosophy toward Indian history set harmful precedent for British figures and liberal policies in the years to come, including his son, John Stuart Mill, the policies of Governor General Thomas Macaulay, and numerous other figures. In his 1999 work Liberalism and Empire, Uday Singh Mehta outlines the framework that Mill proactively established, stating that a nation's progress is dependent on a much more powerful nation:

Mill sees in the histories of backward civilizations a potentiality on account of which they can in fact progress. But the actualization of this potentiality typically turns on a force external to those civilizations … Hindu civilization, for Mill, epitomizes this condition of being stalled in the past. But various aspects of Hindu Civilization had prepared it for progressive transformation.

Mehta later goes on to highlight Mill's argument that the Muslims laid the foundation for British rule to thrive, and that Hindu and Muslim culture were in need of assistance from the British. This motif among British liberalists, that Indians (both Hindus and Muslims), were not capable of civilized self-rule, appears again, as a common occurrence throughout the nineteenth century. The significance of Mill's opus is noticeable in the practical regulations established by Thomas Macaulay soon after. Macaulay served on Lord William Bentinck's Governor-General Supreme Council from 1834 to 1838, and went on to publish his Minute on Indian Education in February 1835. This work set precedent for English education to be mandated in India, with the same, negative perception the British garnered toward Indians, as stated throughout:

“When we pass from works of imagination to works in which facts are recorded, and general principles investigated, the superiority of the Europeans becomes absolutely immeasurable … all the historical information which has been collected from all the books written in the Sanscrit language is less valuable than what may be found in the most paltry abridgments used at preparatory schools in England.”

=== Indian intellectuals of the era ===
A key figure from early 19th century is Raja Ram Mohan Roy. He, along with his compatriots, created a constitutional history for India centred on a local judicial body called Panchayat. Roy himself put forward arguments in favour of Indian representation in Parliament and for constitutionally limiting the East India Company' power. He felt that the Indian public would be empowered by free press and service on juries under a liberal British government. Roy wanted modernity in curriculum for Indian students while not rejecting tradition outright. He was inspired by Christian humanism and insisted on reforming Hinduism, making it more ethical and rational. He has also been called a "British Agent" for his involvement with the Christian Missionaries in their religious conversions.

Another important person was Gopal Krishna Gokhale, leader of the Indian National Congress who demanded self-rule for the Indian subcontinent.

Radical liberals, in contrast to the moderates, were not interested in rehabilitating the Hindu past. They insisted that Hinduism cannot be redeemed because of its historical denial of rights to the downtrodden castes.

=== Liberalism in post-independence India ===
Dr. B.R. Ambedkar is a proponent of liberalism in India, promoting individual rights, social equality, and constitutional democracy. As the primary architect of the Indian Constitution, he incorporated liberal ideas such as free speech, secularism, and the rule of law, assuring protections for oppressed groups. Ambedkar championed education as a method of emancipation, arguing that universal access is necessary for individual empowerment. While his method had elements of classical liberalism. He emphasized human dignity and self-reliance while also advocating for state participation in social justice, including affirmative action and economic safeguards to promote inclusive growth. His idea transformed Indian society into a more equal democracy, integrating liberalism and social justice.

Following independence, various critics emerged against Nehruvian Liberalism, such as Chakravarthi Rajagopalachari, informally known as Rajaji, who parted ways with the Indian National Congress in 1957 and formed the Swatantra Party which supported classical liberal principles and free enterprise. Since then, many new thinkers such as S. V. Raju, Sharad Anantrao Joshi, Barun Mitra, Jayaprakash Narayan, Parth J. Shah, Gurcharan Das, Sauvik Chakraverti, Raghavendar Askani, Venkatesh Geriti, among others, have emerged on the Indian liberal scene, contributing to the debate on freedom in India, and advancing classical liberalism.

=== Role of the State ===
One view is that Indian liberalism has primarily been the context created by the actions of the State – it is not easy to identify a consistent and organic belief system in the country as 'liberal'.

== Economic liberalisation ==
India's first attempt at economic liberalisation was carried out in 1966 as a precondition to an increase in foreign aid.

After Rajiv Gandhi became prime minister in 1984, many young leaders supporting liberal ideologies were made ministers.

The economic liberalisation of 1991, initiated by then-prime minister P. V. Narasimha Rao in response to the 1991 Indian economic crisis, did away with the License Raj and ended many public monopolies, allowing automatic approval of foreign direct investment in many sectors.

== List of liberal parties ==
=== Active parties ===
==== Classical liberal parties ====
- Lok Satta Party
- Nationalist Congress Party
- Swatantra Bharat Paksh
- Telugu Desam Party

==== Social–liberal or left–liberal parties ====
- Trinamool Congress
- Indian National Congress
- Nationalist Congress Party – Sharadchandra Pawar

=== Defunct parties ===
==== Classical liberal parties ====
- Swatantra Party

==== Social–liberal or left–liberal parties ====
- Bharatiya Lok Dal

== See also ==
- Human rights in India
- Politics in India
- Conservatism in India
- Socialism in India
