= Kukatpally Assembly constituency =

Constituency of the Telangana legislative assembly in India

Coordinates: 17.488°N 78.401°E

Kukatpally
- Constituency No. 46 for the Telangana Legislative Assembly
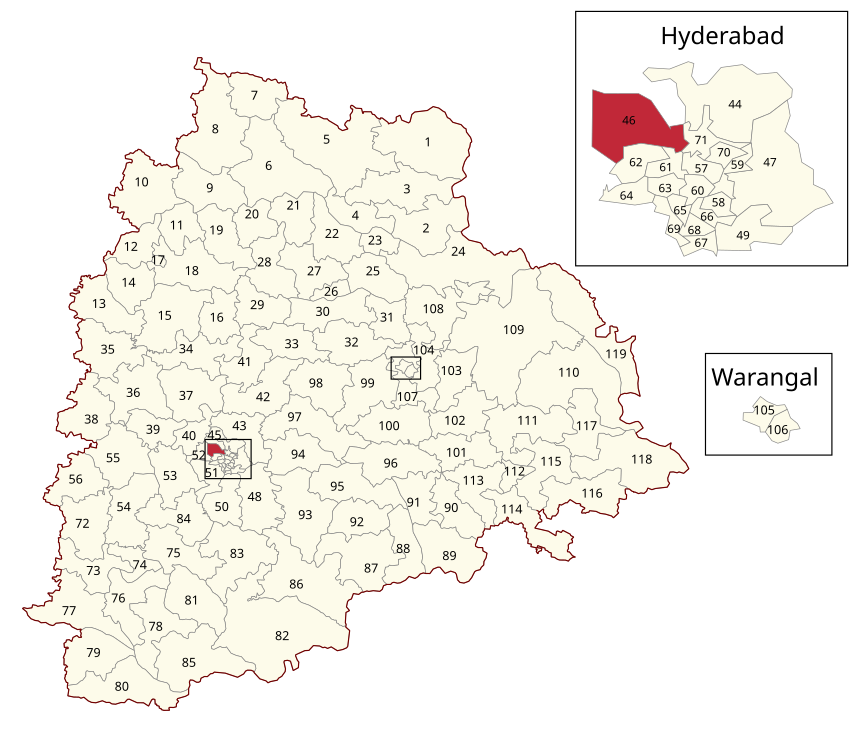
- Location of Kukatpally Assembly constituency within Telangana

Constituency details
- Country: India
- Region: South India
- State: Telangana
- District: Medchal-Malkajgiri
- Lok Sabha constituency: Malkajgiri
- Established: 2008
- Total electors: 4,69,325
- Reservation: None

Member of Legislative Assembly
- 3rd Telangana Legislative Assembly
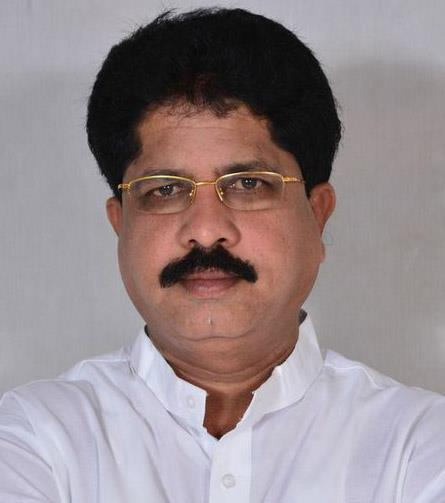
- Incumbent Madhavaram Krishna Rao
- Party: Telangana Rashtra Samithi
- Elected year: 2023

Kukatpally Assembly Constituency is a constituency of Telangana Legislative Assembly, India. It is one of 14 constituencies in Medchal-Malkajgiri district. It is part of Malkajgiri Lok Sabha constituency. It is one of the 24 constituencies of GHMC.

Madhavaram Krishna Rao of Telangana Rashtra Samithi is currently representing the constituency.

== Overview ==
A melting pot of people from different regions, states and cultures, Kukatpally was carved out of the Khairatabad Assembly constituency before the 2009 elections as per Delimitation Act of 2002. The Assembly Constituency currently comprises the following:

Divisions	District
Kukatpally	Medchal-Malkajgiri
Allapur	Medchal-Malkajgiri
Balanagar	Medchal-Malkajgiri
Moosapet	Medchal-Malkajgiri
Fateh Nagar	Medchal-Malkajgiri
Bowenpally	Medchal-Malkajgiri
Begumpet (part)	Medchal-Malkajgiri
Balaji Nagar	Medchal-Malkajgiri
KPHB	Medchal-Malkajgiri

== Members of the Legislative Assembly ==
Election	Name	Party
United Andhra Pradesh
2009	Nagabhairava Jaya Prakash Narayana	Lok Satta Party
Telangana
2014	Madhavaram Krishna Rao	Telugu Desam Party
2018	Madhavaram Krishna Rao	Telangana Rashtra Samithi
2023	Madhavaram Krishna Rao	Bharat Rashtra Samithi

== Election results ==
=== 2023 ===
2023 Telangana Legislative Assembly election: Kukatpally
Party	Candidate	Votes	%	±%
BRS	Madhavaram Krishna Rao	135,635	54.08	
INC	Bandi Ramesh	65,248	26.02	
JSP	Mummareddy Prem Kumar	39,830	15.88	
NOTA	None of the Above	2,458	0.98	
Majority		70,387	28.06	
Turnout		2,50,794		
BRS hold		Swing		

=== 2018 ===
2018 Telangana Legislative Assembly election: Kukatpally
Party	Candidate	Votes	%	±%
TRS	Madhavaram Krishna Rao	111,612	52.30	+27.90
TDP	Nandamuri Venkata Suhasini	70,563	33.10	−10.20
BSP	Harish Chandra Reddy Pannala	12,761	6.00	new
BJP	Madhavaram Kantha Rao	11,943	5.54	
NOTA	None of the Above	2,134	0.99	
Majority		41,049	19.20	+0.60
Turnout		2,15,547	57.81	+9.60
TRS gain from TDP		Swing		

=== Telangana Legislative Assembly election, 2014 ===
Telangana Assembly Elections, 2014: Kukatpally (Assembly constituency)
Party	Candidate	Votes	%	±%
TDP	Madhavaram Krishna Rao	99,874	43.3%	
TRS	Gottimukkala Padma Rao	56,688	24.6%	
INC	M. Narsimha Yadav	23,321	10.1%	
Majority		43,186	18.6%	
Turnout		2,32,239	49.5%	
TDP gain from LSP		Swing		

=== Andhra Pradesh Legislative Assembly election, 2009 ===
Andhra Pradesh Assembly Elections, 2009: Kukatpally (Assembly constituency)
Party	Candidate	Votes	%	±%
LSP	Nagabhairava Jaya Prakash Narayana	71,753	34.84%	
INC	Vaddepalli Narsing Rao	56,110	27.24%	
PRP	Kuna Venkatesh Goud	37,029	17.98%	
Majority		15,643		
Turnout		2,05,976	53.49%	
LSP gain from		Swing	{{{swing}}}	

== See also ==
- List of constituencies of Telangana Legislative Assembly
- Kukatpally
