= Arambham =

- Presented by: Kiriti Rambhatla
- Country of origin: India
- Original language: Telugu
- No. of seasons: 1
- No. of episodes: 14

Production
- Production location: Hyderabad
- Camera setup: Digital, Multi-camera
- Running time: 48 minutes

Original release
- Network: RVS Networks India Pvt Ltd
- Release: 26 January 2014 – March 7, 2014

Arambham is a socio economic Telugu talk show hosted by Kiriti Rambhatla in Telugu language. The first season started on the Republic Day of India 26 January 2014 and aired on RVS Television network in Indian states of Telangana & Andhra Pradesh. The guests on the show includes film stars, politicians, bureaucrats, businessmen & sports personalities. Notable personalities who appeared on the show include Jayaprakash Narayan (Lok Satta), Lakshmi Manchu, Sekhar Kammula & Kota Srinivasa Rao.

== Overview ==
The satellite television RVS TV is the producer and the online distribution rights are held by Dream Axiz. The show is noted for its fresh and technical appeal, and is targeted at the younger audiences. It is known for its content & take on current affairs in the state of Andhra Pradesh. The show was co sponsored by Mahavir Motors (exclusive dealers of Mercedes-Benz passenger vehicles in Andhra Pradesh) and Van Heusen India of PVH (company) group is one of the wardrobe partners. The show covers various segments like sports, economics, business & entertainment & politics.

The first episode went on air on 26 January 2014.

== Regular segments ==
The Social Segment
Questions related to social themes are used. These questions relate to social issues pertaining to the state of Andhra Pradesh and India in general.

Youth Segment
Questions related to youth. Most of the questions centered around social media and 2014 Indian general elections PM contenders. The guests are asked who would they pick as India's PM and why.

Entertainment Segment
Related to movies, personal life & opinions.

Social Message
The guests are asked to give a message to the viewers and sign the Arambham book which would be auctioned and the fund raised given to charity.

== Season 1 ==
Season 1 started on 26 January 2014.

Episode #	Guests
Episode 1	Jayaprakash Narayan (Lok Satta) – Analysis on the Political Economy
Episode 2	Kota Srinivasa Rao – Undue advantage of outside state actors in Telugu film industry
Episode 3	Dr. BalaKrishnam Raju – On Indian Labor Laws & Unorganized Sector employment
Episode 4	Lakshmi Manchu – The first Indian born woman on American Network Television Shows
Episode 5	Actors Trainer Satyanand – The man who trained Mahesh Babu Pawan Kalyan Prabhas Ravi Teja
Episode 6	Shobha Naidu – Classical Dance Kuchipudi & how to preserve it
Episode 7	Chota K. Naidu – A cinematographer's viewpoint on Telugu films
Episode 8	Sekhar Kammula – Only South Indian director to represent Indian Cinema at Cannes film festival.
Episode 9	Schooling – Analysis on Indian primary schools

== Episode 1 ==
Lok Satta party founder and former IAS officer Jayaprakash Narayan (Lok Satta) is the first guest on Arambham. He debated and commented on the " Analysis of State Economy" topic. He discussed various issues of importance on the show like FDI Vs FII, Gold consumption patterns of Indians and its detrimental effects on the society & supply chain inefficiencies in the agricultural sector. He also spoke about Unique Identification Authority of India and its Aadhar card scheme and other relevant issues like whether money should be given in the public distribution system in India. He also spoke about his work in Kukkatpally constituency and the work done by him. In a candid discussion he also mentioned the need for shows like Arambham in Telugu media.

== Episode 2 ==
Veteran Actor Kota Srinivasa Rao spoke about his career and how he feels actors in the state are being under utilized. He lashed out at producers and directors for bringing in non competent actors into Telugu cinema. Kota also opened up on various issues pertaining to MAA association and the work it does. He was skeptical about a lot of his colleagues who entered the television industry.

== Episode 3 ==
Dr. Balakrishnam Raju spoke about vocational training and its impact on the GDP. He spoke about the skilled labor and unorganized sector in the state of Andhra Pradesh

== Episode 4 ==
Telugu film actress Lakshmi Manchu spoke about her career in American television and her roles in the Telugu movie industry.

== Episode 5 ==
Veteran Theater maestro Satyanand spoke about his theater background and acting. Also he got candid about his super star students.

== Episode 6 ==
Shobha Naidu spoke about her classic dancing career and the government role in supporting art forms like Kuchipudi
