= Jaya Prakash Narayana =

Indian politician and activist (born 1956)

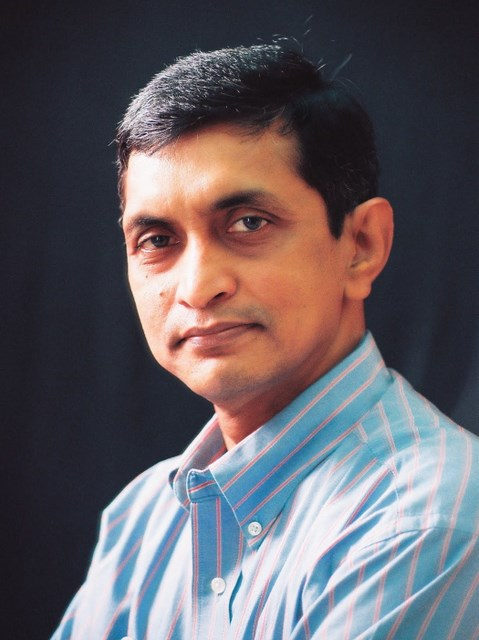

President of Lok Satta Party
- Incumbent
- Assumed office 2 October 2006
- Preceded by: Position established

Member of the Andhra Pradesh Legislative Assembly
- In office 16 May 2009 – 16 May 2014
- Preceded by: Constituency established
- Succeeded by: Madhavaram Krishna Rao
- Constituency: Kukatpally

Personal details
- Born: 14 January 1956 (age 70) Nagbhir, Bombay State, India
- Spouse: Radha
- Children: 2
- Occupation: IAS Officer, Political activist
- Profession: Civil servant, Political reformer
- Known for: Lok Satta Movement, Political commentary

Jaya Prakash Narayana (born 14 January 1956) is an Indian liberal politician, activist and a former public administrator. He is the founder and president of Foundation for Democratic Reforms dedicated to advancing governance reforms, electoral transparency, and decentralized administration in India. He served on the National Advisory Council during UPA‑1 and was a member of the Second Administrative Reforms Commission (2005) as well as the Task Force for the National Rural Health Mission.

A doctor by profession, he joined the Indian Administrative Service and served as an officer of from 1980 to 1996, he took voluntary resignation from the service and started the Loksatta Movement, Lok Satta Party which had been instrumental in bringing several important national reforms.

He is also a political reformer and columnist. He is well known for his role in electoral reforms and the Right to Information (RTI) act. He has also written columns in Indian newspapers, such as Times of India, The Economic Times, Financial Express, The Hindu and Eenadu, The Free Press Journal

== Early life ==
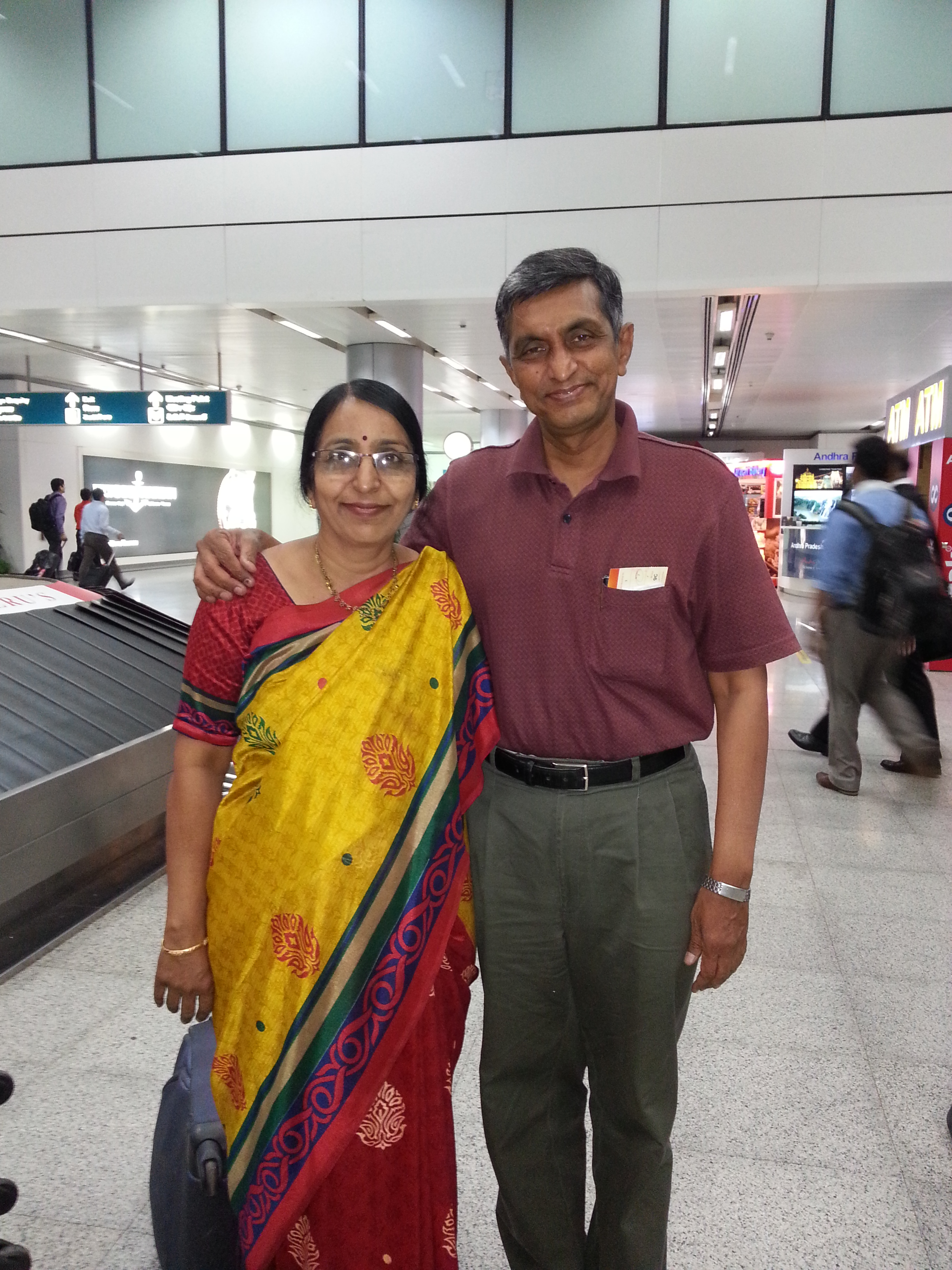
Jayaprakash Narayan with his wife Radha, at Shamshabad International Airport, Hyderabad

Jayaprakash Narayana was born on 14 January 1956, in Naghbir, Maharashtra into a Telugu speaking family of Venkateswara and Balamma. His father was a Railway employee. Narayana was raised in Godavarru Village from the age of 3, near Vijayawada in Andhra Pradesh, and pursued his education in Telugu Medium. He joined Andhra Loyola College in 1969 for his intermediate education. He obtained his medical degree from Guntur Medical College. He identifies himself as an agnostic.

== Civil service ==
Narayana joined public administration after making it to IAS in 1980 standing All India Rank 4. He worked on agriculture, irrigation, technology, and youth rehabilitation projects in various capacities and in various districts of Andhra Pradesh and Telangana. Some of his achievements during his 16-year-long career in government include:

- As Joint Collector, he created full and permanent employment for 8,000 youth from displaced families of the Visakhapatnam Steel Plant.
- As Collector of East Godavari District, he spearheaded the reconstruction of drainage and irrigation network in Krishna, Prakasam and Godavari deltas.
- As Collector of Prakasam district, he successfully mobilized farmers on a large scale to take up irrigation schemes to bring a record two lakh acres under irrigation.
- He strengthened the credit cooperatives by making them independent of government control.
- Served as a Secretary to both Governor, Krishna Kant and the Chief Minister of Andhra Pradesh, N. T. Rama Rao.

He also has several major policy initiatives to his credit.

- Empowerment of parents in schools.
- Speedy justice through rural courts.
- Economic reforms and restructuring of AP.
- Development of the Infocity HITEC City (Hyderabad Information Technology Engineering Consultancy City) in Hyderabad to facilitate the growth of the software industry.
- Empowerment of local governments and stakeholders.
- The much-acclaimed law for self-reliant cooperatives (1995).

=== Positions held ===
- Sub Collector of Narsipatnam, Visakhapatnam district from 1982 to 1984.
- Joint Collector of Visakhapatnam district from 1984 to 1986.
- District Collector of Prakasam district from 1986 to 1989.
- District Collector of East Godavari district from 1989 to 1990.
- MD of Andhra Pradesh State Cooperative Bank Limited from 1990 to 1992.
- Principal Secretary to the Governor of Andhra Pradesh from 1992 to 1994.
- Principal Secretary to the Chief Minister of Andhra Pradesh from 12 December 1994 to 1 September 1995
- MD of Andhra Pradesh Industrial Infrastructure Corporation from 1995 to 1996.

== Social reforms ==
Narayana's experience in the government convinced him that the faulty governance process is the biggest hurdle in India's path of progress and Indians achieving greater success. What India needs today is a fundamental change in the rules of the game and not a periodic change of players. In order to translate his vision into practical reality, he resigned from the I.A.S in 1996 so that he could work on the grassroots movement for good governance. Narayan talked about the efficiency of reforms in the governance and Economy of Andhra Pradesh among several other issues on various platforms in educational and political institutes. He emphasizes that democracy is for the people, of the people and by the people. He is Adviser to India’s Future Foundation, a free-market educational foundation inspired by the Swatantra Party that advances individual liberty, a market economy, and limited government, and he often speaks on economic development and good governance.

=== Political and administrative reforms ===
Narayana has served on the following panels:

- The National Advisory Council (NAC) for the implementation of the National Common Minimum Programme (CMP), July 2004 through August 2006
- Vigilance Advisory Council, constituted by the Central Vigilance Commission, November 2004
- Second Administrative Reforms Commission constituted by the Government of India in September 2005
- National Rural Health Mission of India Task Force, 2005 to 2007.
- He served as a member of the Legislative Assembly from Kukatpally constituency of Telangana in India.

=== Foundation For Democratic Reforms ===
Narayana is the founder member of Foundation for Democratic Reforms (FDR) was established in 1996 and currently serves as its general secretary. FDR is one of India's leading think-tanks and research-resource centers for formulating and promoting fundamental reforms in political, electoral and governance spheres and in critical areas of state policy.

=== Youth Parliament Program ===
Youth Parliament Program founded in 2016 by Ragahvendar Askani and Jayaprakash Narayana and S. S. Rajamouli, Venkatesh Geriti are Adviser, an integral part of the Swatantrata Center, focuses on bridging the gap between youth and policy-making through structured discussion and advocacy.

=== Swatantrata Center ===
He is Adviser to The Swatantrata Center, an India-based public policy and civic education initiative inspired by classical liberal ideas, promoting individual liberty, rule of law, market-led prosperity, and limited government, and it regularly organizes programs on economic freedom and good governance.

== Lok Satta Movement ==
Narayana started the Lok Satta Movement in 1996 to educate the citizens of India about voting, rights and government. Lok Satta, a non-partisan movement for democratic reforms in India, worked on various activities like election reforms, police reforms, right to information act and voter registration procedures. The movement initially started in Andhra Pradesh and later spread across the country, including Mumbai and the Vote JUHU campaigns.

Lok Satta has emerged as India's leading civil society initiative for governance reforms and is at the forefront of key initiatives like disclosure of candidate wealth and criminal history details, political funding reform, decriminalization of politics, improvement of electoral registration, comprehensive judicial reforms including local courts and national judicial commission and citizen's charters.

Lok Satta movement has also been the driving force in achieving the following governance reforms in recent years, among others:

- Substantial reduction in short delivery of petroleum products in all retail outlets (1998 – 2003)
- Significant improvements in voter registration (1999 – till date).
- Disclosure of candidate details, and the disclosure law (2003).
- Political funding reform law of 2003 in the wake of Tehelka expose.
- Strengthening the anti-defection provisions (X Schedule changes, 2003).
- Limiting the size of Council of Ministers (91st Amendment, 2003).
- Right to Information Act, 2005.
- National Rural Health Mission (2005).
- Gram Nyayalayas Act, 2009.
- Support to Lokpal Act, 2011.
- Cancellation of 122 licences of 2-G spectrum by Supreme Court, and revision of policy to ensure allocation of all-natural resources through competitive bidding (2012).
- 97th Amendment to the Constitution guaranteeing autonomy to cooperatives (2012).
- 99th Amendment to the Constitution creating National Judicial Appointments Commission (2015).

== Political career ==
Narayana started the Lok Satta party on 2 October 2006 with clean politics, good governance and improvement of India as the main goals. When he launched the party, he stated that this party aimed to enrich the political scenario in India with its true spirit. He felt that it could be considered as an alternative to any other political party, since it aimed to create a true and faithful political picture in India without involving illegitimate money, liquor, and caste in elections.

=== 2008 By-elections ===
In 2008, the Lok Satta Party ran in the Assembly by-elections for the first time, and was able to secure second place in two of the four places (Khiratabad, Terlam) it contested seats.

=== Andhra Pradesh 13th Assembly ===
Narayana is one of the vocal leaders in assembly proceedings. Some of the major contributions to Andhra Pradesh 13th assembly are:

- proposed the Anti Corruption Bill to amend the State's Prevention of Corruption Act, 1988, to curb corruption in the state by including elected members under civil servants.
- advanced all party resolution to elect deputy speaker from opposition;
- opposed amendment to Andhra Pradesh Societies Act claiming that it is against the right to form unions as per the Constitution;
- opposed populist schemes in 2009, 2010 and 2011 Andhra Pradesh Budgets.
- pressed the need for gas grid and industrial development;
- condemned the demolition of statues on Tankbund;
- demanded investigation into land and natural resource allocation scams and provided evidences. According to the sources, he later declared that they would come back with an updated Loksatta 2.0 version that would focus on restructuring and reinforcing federalism, establishing quality universal health care and education to all and liability to taxpayers at local level.

== Awards ==
Narayan has been felicitated with several laurels. These include:

- Honored with the "Rotary Manav Seva Award 2002" for his crusade against corruption.
- Awarded the "Yudhvir Memorial Award 2002" for his outstanding contribution to the cause of good governance.
- Awarded the "Dr. Rustam D.Ranji Rotary Award" by Rotary Club of India.
- Awarded the "D. Ch. Tirupathi Raju Memorial Award 2004"
- Honored with prestigious "Dr. Pinnamaneni Sita Devi Foundation Award".
- Honored with the "Bharat Asmita Jana Jagran Shreshta" - in the area of Public Awakening.
- Felicitated by the Hyderabad Software Exporters Association, Hyderabad in recognition for his contribution to the growth of IT industry.

== National panels ==
Dr. Jayaprakash Narayan has served on several national panels. Notable among them are:

- National Advisory Council (NAC), 2004- 2006.
- Vigilance Advisory Council constituted by the Central Vigilance Commission, 2004 – 2008.
- Second Administrative Reforms Commission constituted by the Government of India from 2005 – 2007.

== See also ==
- Lok Satta Party
- Lok Satta Movement
