= Kundan Vidya Mandir, Ludhiana =

Kundan Vidya Mandir
- Rajpura Road, Civil Lines, Ludhiana, Punjab 141001; India

Information
- Type: Private
- Established: 1941
- Founder: Kundan Lal
- School district: Ludhiana
- Authority: Shri Kundan Lal Trust
- President: Ramesh Agrawal
- Principal: Pankaj Joshi (Ludhiana); Yogesh Jadli (Chandigarh)
- Staff: 350+
- Grades: K-12
- Gender: Co-Ed
- Enrollment: 5000+ (2019)
- Language: English
- Campus type: Urban
- Affiliation: Central Board of Secondary Education (CBSE)
- Website: www.kvmschool.edu.in

Kundan Vidya Mandir, also known as Kundan Vidya Mandir Senior Secondary School (abbreviated to KVM) is a co-educational senior secondary school with 2 campuses in Ludhiana. It was founded in 1941 by freedom fighter, Kundan Lal. The school is affiliated with the Central Board of Secondary Education (CBSE). It offers education from kindergarten to class XII.

The current principal of the school is Pankaj Joshi. It is run by Shri Kundan Lal Trust, which also has a school in Chandigarh by name of Kundan International School.

== History ==
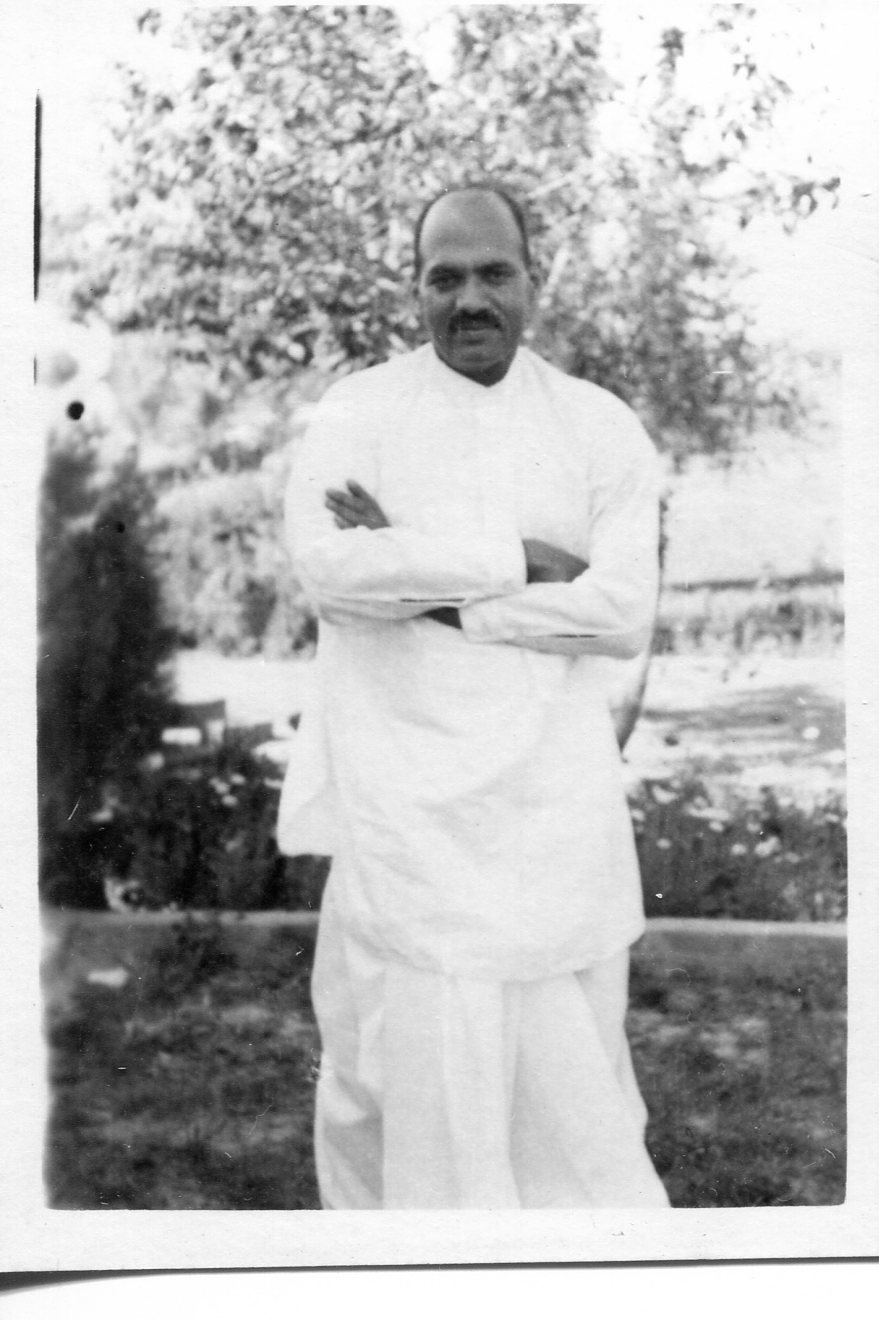
Kundan Lal (1893 – 1966), the founder of Kundan Vidya Mandir

Founded in 1941, the school is named after its founder, Kundan Lal, who was a freedom fighter and philanthropist.

It got affiliated to the Central Board of Secondary Education in 1963, becoming the first CBSE school in Punjab, India.

The school has another branch in Chandigarh, called Kundan International School, which was established in 2007. The Chandigarh campus is headed by the headmistress, Yogesh Jadli

The school is administered and managed by the Shri Kundan Lal Trust, a charitable trust.

== Campus ==
The school's infrastructure facilities include a library, labs for physics, chemistry, biology, geography, psychology, a conference hall, music rooms, and dance rooms. It hosts 120 classrooms, an activity room, art room, computer labs, robotics lab, VR lab, home science lab, math lab, language lab, canteen, state of the art auditorium and infirmary.

The sports facilities of Kundan Vidya Mandir include two splash pools, volleyball court, football ground, cricket ground, badminton courts, skating rink and shooting range. It also has a playground that measures 3937 square metres. The school campus of KVM is spread across 7 acres.

== Notable alumni ==
- Pankaj Kapur (Actor)
- Harjot Kaur (Civil servant & Strategic Adviser to the World Bank)
- Karan Goel (cricketer)
- Gitansh Khera (cricketer)
- Harjot Singh Bains

Kundan Vidya Mandir Alumni Association is an active Alumni body which hosts the worlds biggest Alumni Cricketing Event - Kundanites Premier League (KPL), along with other events like Musical Nights, Walk for Cancer, Kundan Talks, Alumni Meets etc.

== Recognition ==
- Kundan Vidya Mandir was listed among the top ten schools in Ludhiana by The Hush Post in 2018.
- The school has been ranked #218 in the survey of EW Ranking in 2017.
- It ranked #5 in a list of Punjab's Top School Ranking 2014 by the Elets 's Digital Learning (DL) Ranking.
- Kundan Vidya Mandir was awarded Rex Karmaveer Education Change Champion Fellowship and Karmaveer Chakra Award in 2019.

== See also ==
- Education in Punjab, India
- List of schools in India
