= D. V. V. S. Varma =

- Born: Tanuku, Andhra Pradesh
- Occupations: Working President, Party General Secretary
- Political party: Lok Satta Party
- Movement: Lok Satta Movement
- Children: 2
- Website: dvvsvarmablogspot.com

D.V.V.S. Varma was the Working President of the Lok Satta Party for Andhra Pradesh State. He was actively involved in Lok Satta movement from the time of its inception. He has served in various office-bearer positions for the Lok Satta Party. He is also a reputed newspaper columnist and media analyst of political and policy affairs.

== Early life ==
Mr. Varma lived in Tanuku of West Godavari district along with his wife and two children.

== Political Involvement ==
D.V.V.S. Varma has been an active member of the communist movement in Andhra Pradesh, and the Communist Party of India (CPI), for more than two decades and worked at the grassroots level. After quitting the CPI in the mid '90s, Mr. Varma continued to work in the areas of primary education and sanitation and eventually joined the Lok Satta movement.

=== Lok Satta Movement ===
Under the leadership of Mr. Varma, the Lok Satta Movement expanded its presence across all 23 districts of Andhra Pradesh, establishing primary units in many mandals. He served as the State Campaign Coordinator for Andhra Pradesh. He was involved in the campaign for candidate disclosures, including the “People’s Ballot,” and contributed to the Movement for Empowerment of Local Governments as well as the statewide ‘1-crore signature campaign,’ which focused on strengthening local governance at the level of panchayats and municipalities.

He was also actively involved in coordinating the "Vote India" campaign.

== Lok Satta Party ==
DVVS Varma was chosen as the Party General Secretary in 2006. He was one of the contestants that ran for the President of Lok Satta Party in the first organisational election in January 2009.

Till 2014, D.V.V.S. Varma was the President of Lok Satta Party for unified Andhra Pradesh State. From 2014 to 2015, D.V.V.S. Varma was the President of Lok Satta Party for Andhra Pradesh State.

== Editor ==
He is also the Chief Editor of Jaateeya Spurthi, a Telugu current affairs fortnightly. Previously, he was the Editor of Lok Satta Times fortnightly (Telugu), the official magazine of Lok Satta Party. Viewers can access this magazine at www.loksatta.org website.
