= Priyanka Bissa =

NSS President Awardee

- Born: Raipur, Chhattisgarh
- Other name: Priyanka Bissa
- Occupations: Social Entrepreneur and Research Scholar
- Known for: NSS President Awardee 2017-18
- Awards: National Service Scheme, Karmaveer Chakra Award

Priyanka Bissa is a social entrepreneur and received the National Service Scheme Award from former president of India Ram Nath Kovind for her contributions to social service

== Early life and career ==
Priyanka Bissa, also known as "Chhattisgarh Ki Beti," is a youth leader and social entrepreneur from Raipur, Chhattisgarh. She is recognized for her work in youth empowerment and community development. Priyanka visited China as part of an Indian youth delegation to improve relations between India and China. 2019 She was invited by the Ministry of Youth Affairs and Sports, Government of India She is an active member of the Nehru Yuva Kendra Sangathan (NYKS) under the Ministry of young Affairs and Sports

Bissa has achieved considerable progress in the National Service Scheme (NSS) and was prominently featured in the UPSC and PSC syllabuses. In 2020, she became the youngest person about whom a question was posed in the Civil Service Exam, a historic first in the NSS's 50-year existence.

== Awards ==
- National Service Scheme President Awardee 2017-18 by President of India
- She received two national awards: India's First Mega Youth Parliament Winner 2018 by the Ministry of Youth Affairs and Sports and India's First Youth to provide a free blood card by the Ministry of Tourism and Religion.
- Karmaveer Chakra Award and Global Fellowship Award by the International Confederation of NGOs and the United Nations
