= Administrative Reforms Commission =

Indian government commission

The Administrative Reforms Commission (ARC) is the commission appointed by the Government of India for giving recommendations for reviewing the public administration system of India. The first ARC was established on 5 January 1966. The Administrative Reforms Commission was initially chaired by Morarji Desai, and later on K. Hanumanthaiah became its chairman when Desai became the Deputy Prime Minister of India.

The Second Administrative Reforms Commission (ARC) was constituted on 31 August 2005, as a Commission of Inquiry, under the Chairmanship of Veerappa Moily for preparing a detailed blueprint for revamping the public administrative system.

== First Administrative Reforms Commission-5 January 1966 ==
The first ARC was constituted by the Ministry of Home Affairs under Government of India by resolution no. 40/3/65-AR(P) dated 5 January 1966. In the resolution, the composition of the ARC, the mandate of the commission and the procedures to be followed were described.

=== Mandate ===
The Commission was mandated to give consideration to the need for ensuring the highest standards of efficiency and integrity in the public services, and for making public administration a fit instrument for carrying out the social and economic policies of the Government and achieving social and economic goals of development, as also one which is responsive to the people. In particular, the Commission is to consider the following:

1. The machinery of the Government of India and its procedures of work;
2. The machinery for planning at all levels;
3. Center-State relationships;
4. Financial administration;
5. Personnel administration;
6. Economic administration;
7. Administration at the State level;
8. District administration;
9. Agricultural administration; and
10. Problems of redress of citizen's grievances.

==== Exclusions ====
The Commissions may exclude from its purview the detailed examination of administration of defence, railways, external affairs, security and intelligence work, as also subjects such as educational administration already being examined by a separate commission. The Commission will, however, be free to take the problems of these sectors into account in recommending reorganization of the machinery of the Government as a whole or of any of its common service agencies.

=== Recommendation Reports ===
The Commission submitted the following 20 reports before winding up in mid-1970s:

1. Problems of Redress of Citizens Grievances (Interim)
2. Machinery for Planning
3. Public Sector Undertakings
4. Finance, Accounts & Audit
5. Machinery for Planning (Final)
6. Economic Administration
7. The Machinery of GOI and its procedures of work
8. Life Insurance Administration
9. Central Direct Taxes Administration
10. Administration of UTs & NEFA
11. Personnel Administration
12. Delegation of Financial & Administrative Powers
13. Center-State Relationships
14. State Administration
15. Small Scale Sector
16. Railways
17. Treasuries
18. Reserve Bank of India
19. Posts and Telegraphs
20. Scientific Departments

The above 20 reports contained 537 major recommendations. Based on inputs received from various administrative Ministries, a report indicating implementation position was placed before the Parliament in November, 1977.

== Second Administrative Reforms Commission-31 August 2005 ==
The Second ARC was set up with a resolution no. K-11022/9/2004-RC of the Government of India as a committee of inquiry to prepare a detailed blueprint for revamping the public administration system.

=== Composition of the Second ARC ===
- Veerappa Moily - Chairperson
- V. Ramachandran - Member
- Dr. A.P. Mukherjee - Member
- Dr. A.H. Kalro - Member
- Jayaprakash Narayan - Member
- Vineeta Rai - Member-Secretary

Veerappa Moily resigned with effect from 1 April 2009. V. Ramachandran was appointed chairman. Jayaprakash Narayan resigned with effect from 1 September 2007.

=== Mandate ===
The Commission was given the mandate to suggest measures to achieve a proactive, responsive, accountable, sustainable and efficient administration for the country at all levels of the government. The Commission was asked to, among other things, consider the following :

(i) Organisational structure of the Government of India (ii) Ethics in governance (iii) Refurbishing of Personnel Administration (iv) Strengthening of Financial Management Systems (v) Steps to ensure effective administration at the State level (vi) Steps to ensure effective District Administration (vii) Local Self-Government/Panchayati Raj Institutions (viii) Social Capital, Trust and Participative public service delivery (ix) Citizen-centric administration (x) Promoting e-governance (xi) Issues of Federal Polity (xii) Crisis Management (xiii) Public Order

==== Exclusions ====
The Commission was to exclude from its purview the detailed examination of administration of Military defence, railways, external affairs, security and intelligence, as also subjects such as Centre-state relations, judicial reforms etc. which were already being examined by other bodies. The Commission, however, be free to take the problems of these sectors into account in recommending re-organisation of the machinery of the Government or of any of its service agencies.

=== Working of Second ARC ===
The Commission will devise procedures (including for consultations with Indian foreign services), and may appoint committees, consultants/advisers to assist it. The Commission may take into account the existing material and reports available on the subject and consider building upon them. The Ministries and Departments of the Government of India will furnish information and documents and provide other assistance as may be required to the Commission. The Government of India in allegory to the State Governments and only other concerned to extend their solidarity and assistance to A Commission.

=== Recommendation reports ===
The commission has presented the following 15 Reports to the A Commission for consideration:

1. Right to Information - Master Key to Good Governance (09.06.2006)
2. Unlocking Human Capital - Entitlements and Governance-a Case Study (31.07.2006)
3. Crisis management - From Despair to Hope (31.10.2006)
4. Ethics in Governance (12.02.2007)
5. Public Law and Order - Justice for each..... peace for all. (25.06.2007)
6. Local Governance | (27.11.2007)
7. Capacity Building for PEACE Resolution - Friction to Fusion (17.3.2008)
8. Combating Terrorism
9. Social Capital - A Shared Destiny
10. Refurbishing of Personnel Administration - Scaling New Heights
11. Promoting e-Governance - The Smart Way Forward (A. 20.01.2009)
12. Citizen Centric Administration - The Heart of Governance
13. Organisational Structure of Government of India
14. Strengthening Financial Management Systems
15. State and District Administration

=== Implementation of recommendations ===
The Government constituted a Group of Ministers (GoM) on 30 March 2007 under the Chairmanship of the then External Affairs Minister to consider the recommendations of the Second ARC and to review the pace of implementation of the recommendations as well as to provide guidance to the concerned Ministries/Departments in implementation. It has since been reconstituted under the Chairmanship of Union Finance Minister on 21 August 2009. Core Group on Administrative Reforms under the Chairmanship of Cabinet Secretary has finished examination of all the 15 reports. This Group of Ministers has so far considered fifteen reports:

1. Right to Information: Master Key to Good Governance (First report)
2. Unlocking human capital: Entitlements and Governance – a Case Study relating to NREGA (Second Report)
3. Crisis Management From Despair to Hope (Third report)
4. Ethics in Governance (Fourth Report)
5. Public order (Fifth Report)
6. Local Governance (Sixth Report)
7. Capacity Building for Conflict Resolution (Seventh Report)
8. Combating Terrorism Protecting by Righteousness (Eight Report)
9. Social Capital-A Shared Destiny (Ninth Report)
10. Refurbishing of Personnel Administration- Scaling new Heights (Tenth Report)
11. Promoting e-governance: The smart way Forward (Eleventh Report)
12. Citizen Centric Administration – The Heart of Governance (Twelfth Report)
13. Organisational Structure of Government of India (Thirteenth Report)
14. Strengthening Financial management System (Fourteenth Report)
15. State and District Administration (Fifteenth Report)

The decisions of GoM on these reports are at various stages of implementation. The report on "Combating Terrorism (Eighth Report)" has been handled by the Ministry of Home Affairs and it is understood that necessary action has already been taken on this report. Thus, in all 12 Reports have been considered, so far. Remaining three reports (Report No.V, X, and XIV ) are also shortly being put up for consideration of GoM. The Cabinet in its meeting held on 3 December 2009 had taken note of the progress of action taken in respect of second report (Unlocking human capital) relating to NREGA and in its meeting held on 29 December 2009 has taken note of the progress of action taken in respect of the first report (Right to Information) and third report (Crisis Management).

== See also ==
- The Lokpal Bill, 2011
- Jan Lokpal Bill

== Notes ==
- The first ARC recommended for the setting up of Lokpal (ombudsman) in 1966.
