= Rice Bucket Challenge =

Internet challenge

The Rice Bucket Challenge is a response to the Ice Bucket Challenge that started in India and spread to other South Asian nations. Whereas the original Ice Bucket Challenge involved participants pouring a bucket of ice over their heads and/or donating to the ALS research, the Rice Bucket Challenge involves donating a bucket of rice to a poor person or family.

== Significance ==
As an alternative to the Ice Bucket Challenge, the Rice Bucket Challenge served the dual purpose of highlighting water scarcity (in that the use of ice was considered expensive and wasteful) and poverty (in that a bucket of rice was considered a valuable donation by recipients).

== History ==
The idea for the Rice Bucket Challenge is attributed to Manju Latha Kalanidhi, a 38-year-old journalist based in Hyderabad, India. She considered the Ice Bucket Challenge artificial and wasteful of water, and came up with the Rice Bucket Challenge as a less-wasteful alternative that would help local communities. It started off as a Facebook page on August 23, 2014, and within a day, the page had 7000 likes. On August 24, 2014, the Twitter hashtag #ricebucketchallenge was first used, and within a month, the hashtag had been tweeted 11,000 times. On August 25, the Rice Bucket Challenge was covered in BuzzFeed and Quartz, and within a few days, it had received coverage in the Huffington Post, Chicago Tribune, CNN, CNBC, NPR, NDTV, Time, and many other news websites.

The Rice Bucket Challenge spread to other South Asian nations, including Nepal and Sri Lanka. Ingress Philippines attempted to start the challenge in the Philippines on Google+ private post It was forwarded to other social network sites on September 3, 2014, as a public post and accepted by Ingress Enlightened Philippines community on the same day. A version of this challenge not related to it was led by businessman Dr. Henry Lim Bon Liong in Manila in the Philippines on September 12, 2014, that attracted media attention in the Philippines.
