= Foundation for Democratic Reforms =

Indian nonprofit institution

- Formation: 5th November 1996
- Type: Public Policy Think Tank
- Purpose: Structural Reforms of Indian Governance System
- Headquarters: B 106, 1st Floor, Pasha Court; Punjagutta; Hyderabad – 500016
- Location: Hyderabad, India
- General Secretary: Dr. Jayaprakash Narayan
- Website: www.fdrindia.org

The Foundation for Democratic Reforms is a non-profit, non-partisan and independent research institution founded by Dr. Jayaprakash Narayan, an Indian Administrative Service officer turned politician and a political activist based in Hyderabad. It is one of India's leading think tanks and scientific research-resource center for studying, formulating and promoting fundamental reforms in political, electoral and governance spheres and in critical areas of state policy. Established in 1996 and located in Hyderabad, it is recognized by the Department of Scientific & Industrial Research (DSIR), Ministry of Science & Technology, Govt. of India.

== Objective ==
The aim of the foundation is to enable every Indian citizen to fully realize and enjoy:

- Liberty and basic freedoms
- Genuine democracy
- Self-governance
- Self-correcting institutions
- Rule of law

== Focus areas ==
- Electoral And Political Reforms
- Rule Of Law
- Service Delivery
- Local Governance
- Civil Service Reforms
- Public Finance
- Education
- Healthcare
- Agriculture
- Small Town Development

== Areas of work ==
Surajya Movement: a movement to awaken people about good governance

Indian Democracy at Work: a forum to deliberate on critical levers of change that need to be pushed to make democracy deliver better results conducted first Conference on Money Power in Politics

== See also ==
- Youth Parliament Program
- Democracy in India
- Election Commission of India
- List of think tanks in India
