= Raghavendar Askani =

Social activist

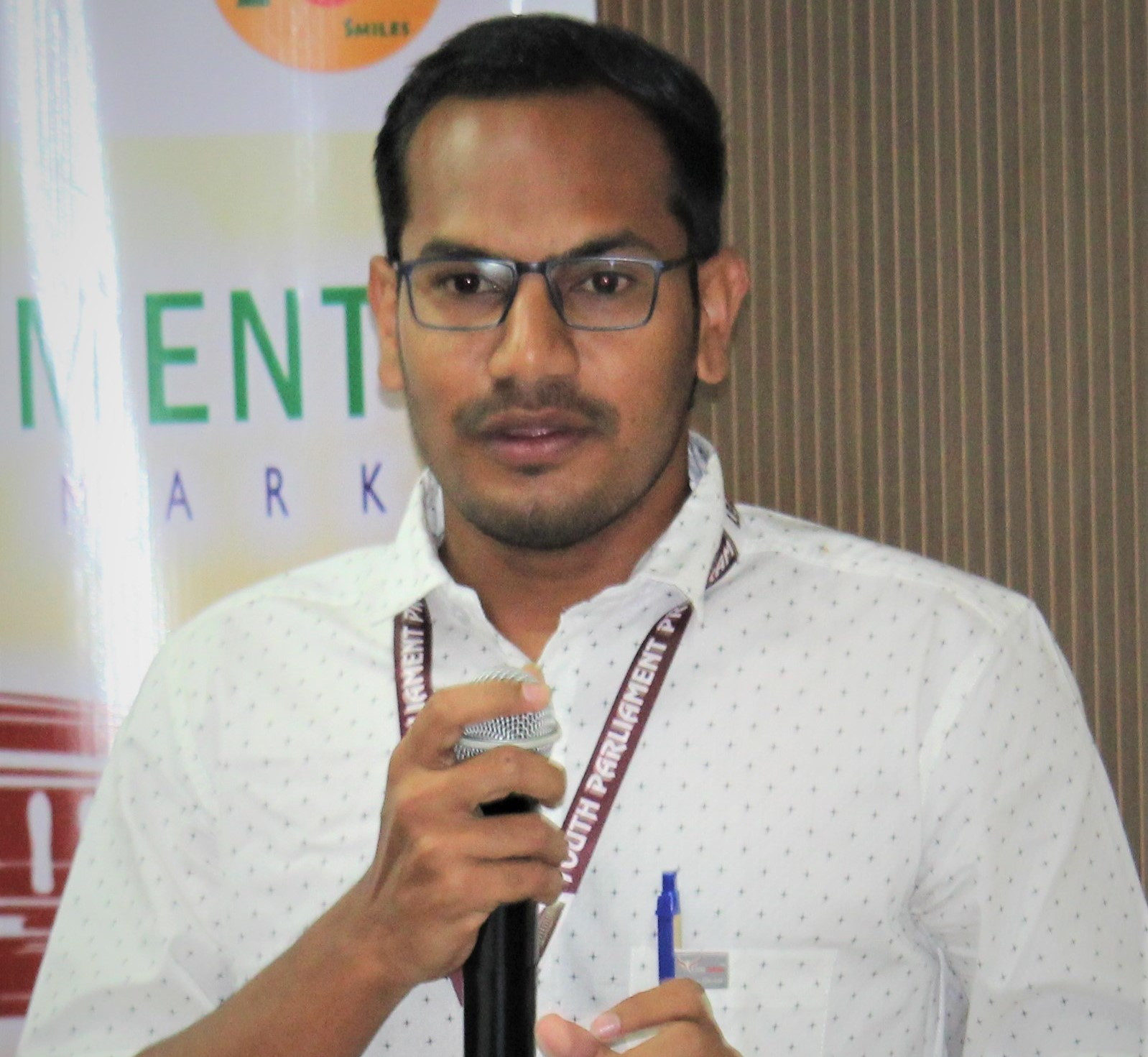
- Raghavendar addressing at the 2020 Youth Parliament, Leadership Boot Camp

President of Youth Parliament Program
- Incumbent
- Assumed office 2 October 2016
- Preceded by: Position established

Director of Swatantrata Center for Human Flourishing Foundation
- Incumbent
- Assumed office 24 July 2019

Personal details
- Born: Wanaparthy, India
- Occupation: Social activist, Social Entrepreneur
- Profession: Political reformer, Economic reformer
- Known for: Youth Parliament Program, Liberal Activist, Civil and political rights

Raghavendar Askani is an Indian classical liberal, social activist. He is the founder and president of the Youth Parliament Program and co-founder and director of the Swatantrata Center, an Indian liberal public policy think tank. He has also written columns in Indian newspapers, such as The Print, Telangana Today.

== Early life and activism ==
Askani is from Wanaparthy, Telangana. As a student leader, he was drawn to public service and civic activity at a young age, and he became the National Coordinator of Youth for Better India. Raghavendar played a crucial role in the 2011 Indian anti-corruption movement campaign, particularly in the Telugu states, where he advocated for the strong Lokpal Bill.

Raghavendar worked to educate people about who S.R. Sankaran was, not just as a bureaucrat, but as someone who used his position to push for those the system had long ignored, including his quiet but firm backing of the Safai Karmachari Andolan and its fight to end manual scavenging.

He is an Indian anti-corruption and Right to Information Act advocate who exposed corruption in many colleges in the Mahabubnagar District fee reimbursement and scholarship program, resulting in the misappropriation of funds intended for low-income students. Through the Right to Information Act, the advocacy secured fee reimbursements for thousands of students across colleges, preventing financial barriers to their education and saving over one billion rupees

He was honored with the International Confederation of Non-Governmental Organizations, and the United Nations presented the Karmaveer Chakra Award and Global Fellowship Award in 2021 for his impactful contributions to social reform and youth empowerment.

Raghavendar translated Leonard E. Read's 1958 essay I, Pencil, the foundational work of the Foundation for Economic Education, into Telugu. This marked the first Indian-language translation of the essay, intending to promote liberal ideas in India. In introducing the translation, American Economist Lawrence Reed lauded Gangaraju Gunnam's Vihangam as an Indian parallel to Ayn Rand's Atlas Shrugged.

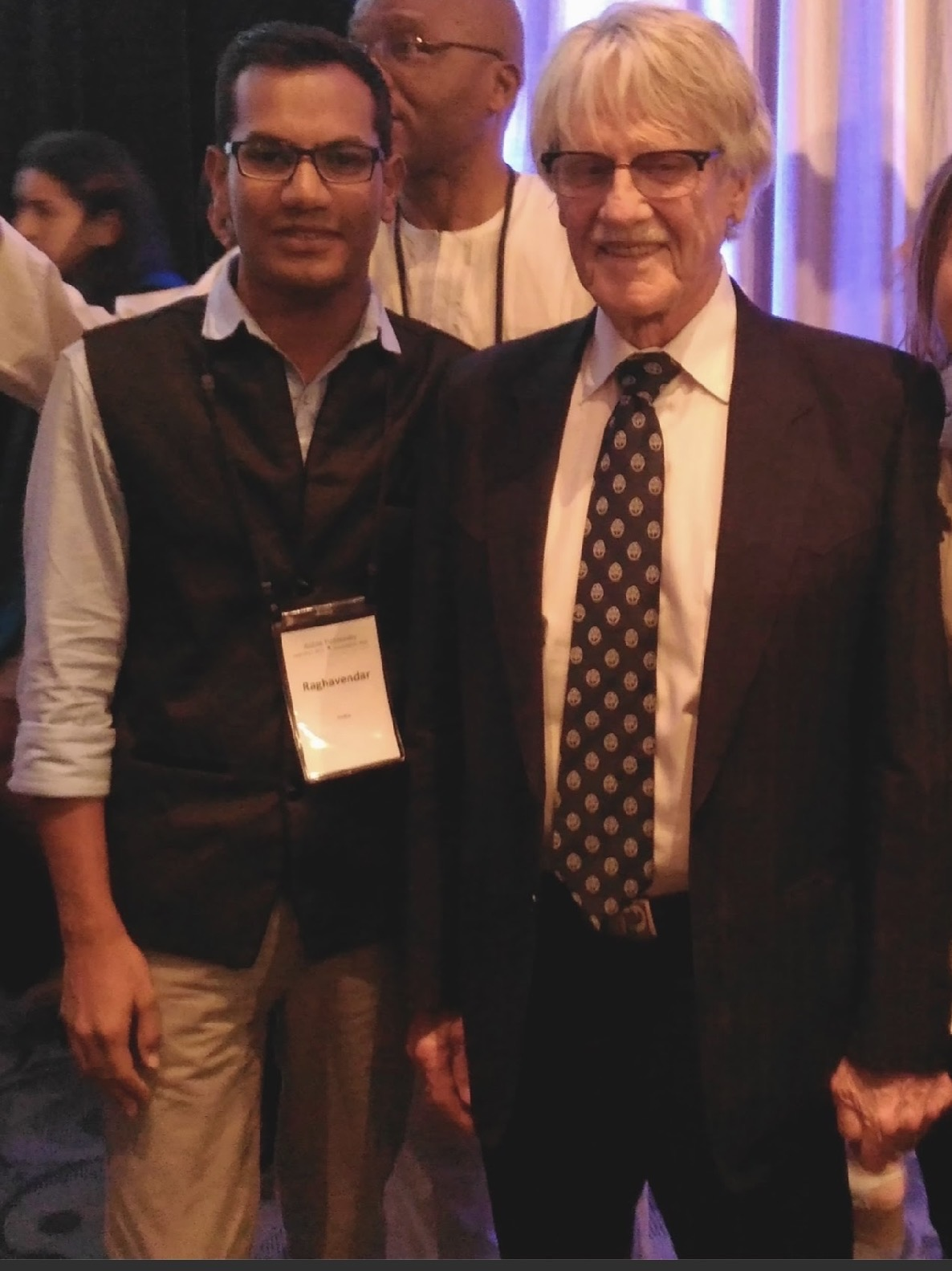
Raghavendar Askani with Nobel laureate economist Vernon L. Smith, in Grand Rapids, Michigan, 2016.

=== Youth Parliament Program ===
In 2016, Askani founded the Youth Parliament Program, aimed at fostering civic engagement and leadership among the youth. The program provides a platform for discussing pressing societal issues and developing innovative solutions and young people to learn about parliamentary procedures, debate policy issues, and develop leadership skills.

- The program has received accolades for its focus on education and youth participation.
- empowering young minds by organizing Model Youth Parliament sessions, Leadership Bootcamp

=== Swatantrata Center ===
In 2019, Askani co-founded the Swatantrata Center, focusing on policy advocacy and economic reforms. The organization emphasizes empowering youth through workshops, conferences, and public discussions.

- Campaigning for 24/7 open business operations in Hyderabad for economic development and creating more employment opportunities.
- Advocating for a Model Code of Conduct against police violence, He sent in letters to all Supreme Court and High Court justices in India.

== See also ==
- Youth Parliament Program
- Students for Liberty
- Youth council
- Liberalism in India
