= Manju Latha Kalanidhi =

Indian journalist

Manjulatha Kalanidhi
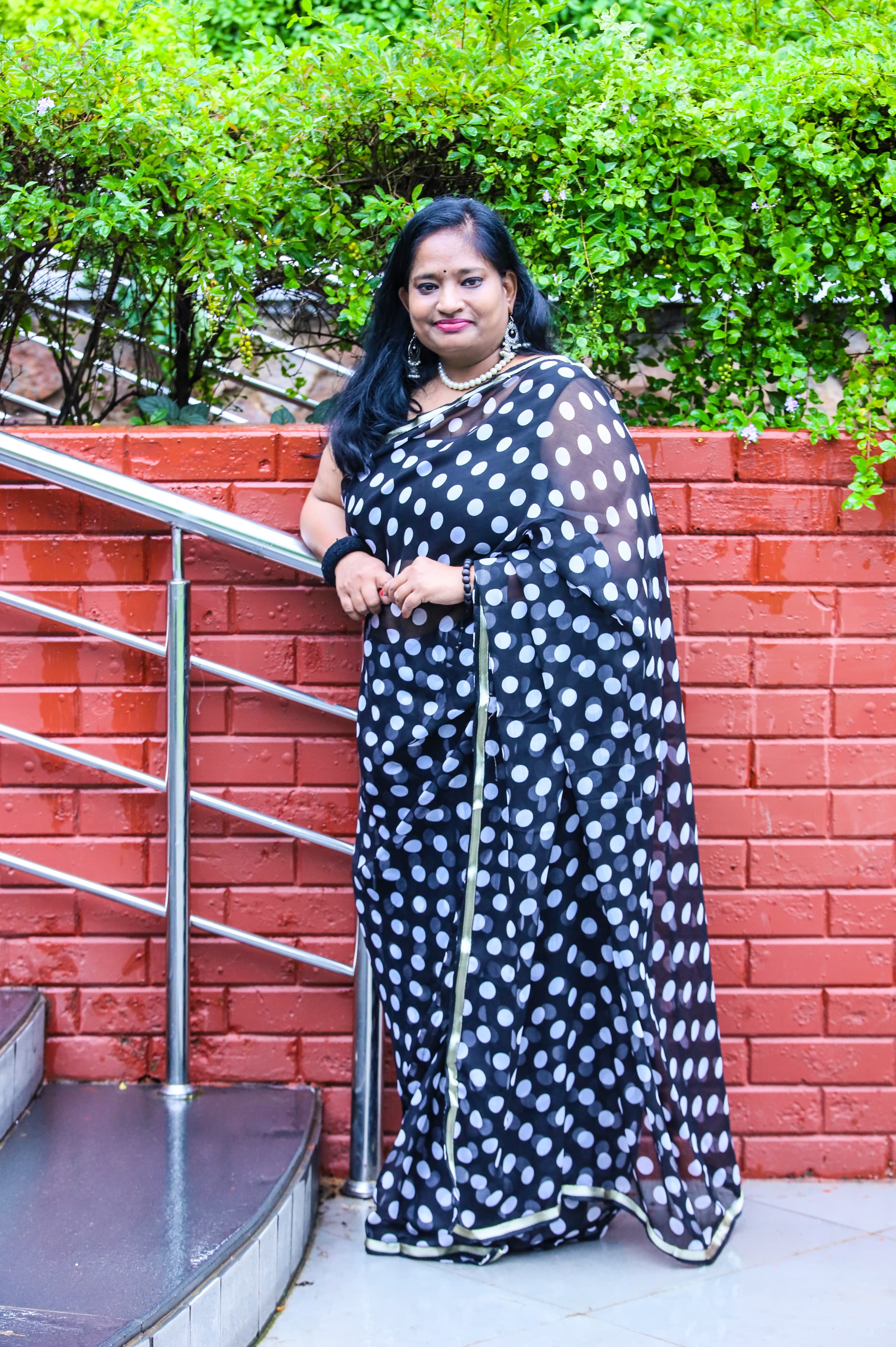
- Occupations: Journalist, creator Rice Bucket Challenge
- Years active: 1997 –present
- Spouse: Vijeye Devuni
- Children: Vanshika Devuni
- Awards: Karmaveer Chakra Award, REX Karmaveer Global Fellowship, Points of Light Award

Manju Latha Kalanidhi is an Indian journalist, feature writer, columnist and creator of Rice Bucket Challenge. She is currently the City Editor at The New Indian Express in Hyderabad.

== Early life ==
Manju Latha Kalanidhi, studied in St. Ann's School in Kazipet, Warangal. She has obtained her post-graduate diploma in Journalism from Asian College of Journalism, Chennai.

== Career ==
Manjulatha started her career as a journalist in Deccan Chronicle, a Hyderabad-based largest circulated daily English newspaper. She worked there for six years and then joined as an editor in Big Hyderabad. She also worked in WOW! Hyderabad, a lifestyle magazine published by Dr Reddy's Foundation. She also worked in an online media house, Progressive Digital Media. Later, she joined as features editor in English daily The Hans India, where she used to handle daily and weekly features. She also led Young Hans, an educational supplement of The Hans India. She worked for Oryza.com, a web-based rice research journal, where the idea of rice bucket challenge crossed her mind. Later, she took up a full-time assignment in The New Indian Express.

As part of her job in Oryza.com, she had to do a lot of research on rice crop. She studied a lot of stories on hunger and rice. Inspired by the popular ALS Ice Bucket Challenge, Manju wanted to give a human touch to it and kick-started the Rice Bucket Challenge that touched several lives. She donated a bucket full of rice to a daily wage-earner who sells idli/dosa (snacks in Indian breakfast) on a bicycle. She posted a photograph of it on her Facebook wall and tagged some of her friends and challenged them to continue it. She has chosen this because rice is the staple food in many parts of India and also the world. This would satiate the hunger of several millions of hungry stomachs, especially those who cannot make their ends meet. Thousands of people in India and abroad took up the challenge and actively participated in it. A lot of corporate houses, private organizations, educational institutions and individuals actively took part in the campaign and donated generously.

== Awards ==
An International Confederation of United Nations and NGOs (iCONGOs) Karmaveer Chakra Award and REX Karmaveer Global Fellowship

In 2020 she was awarded the Commonwealth Points of Light Award for her voluntary service during the COVID-19 pandemic in India.
