= Prasad Bidapa =

Indian fashion stylist and choreographer

- Born: Kodagu, Karnataka
- Spouse: Judith Bidapa

Prasad Bidapa is a Bangalore-based fashion stylist and choreographer for various fashion events and shows. He is known to be a fashion consultant, choreographer, image consultant and stylist.

== Career ==
Prasad Bidapa Mega Model Hunt is credited to having trained and discovered some of the biggest faces in Bollywood like Deepika Padukone, Anushka Sharma, Lara Dutta, Jacqueline Fernandez, John Abraham, Arjun Rampal, Dino Morea, and many more. He is also a member of the Bangalore Political Action Committee (B.PAC).

== Family ==
Prasad Bidapa lives with his family at a farm in Yelahanka,Bengaluru. He also has a son named Adam Bidapa who is a model is also the brother of Aviva Bidapa, the wife of actor Abishek Ambareesh.
