= Youth Parliament Program =

Indian youth organization

- Abbreviation: YPP
- Formation: October 2, 2016
- Founder: Raghavendar Askani
- Purpose: Education, Health, Agricultural, Political, Electoral, Public Policy, Decentralization, Judicial, Reforms
- Headquarters: Hyderabad, India
- Leader: Dr. Jayaprakash Narayan (YPP) Adviser; Venkatesh Geriti (YPP) Adviser
- Parent organisation: Swatantrata Center; Youth For Better India; India’s Future Foundation; Foundation for Democratic Reforms
- Website: www.yppindia.in

The Youth Parliament or Youth Parliament Program (YPP), an integral part of the Swatantrata Center, is a liberal public policy think-tank based in India which focuses on ideas and policies that cause human flourishment and India's Future Foundation, Foundation for Democratic Reforms under the leadership of Raghavendar Askani and Dr. Jayaprakash Narayan for the youth, to speak up and make an impact on the change agenda for the country.

The Youth Parliament Program would be a debate between the best debaters, policymakers, and opinion-makers. The platform is meant to inspire the youth to express their views in an organized way.

== History ==
In 2010, They set up an international framework for youth participation in democracy and the Forum of Young Parliamentarians to bring in fresher faces to the political process.

== Programmes ==
=== Model Youth Parliament Program ===
The Model Youth Parliament Programs (YPP) lay a bridge between youth, like-minded people working for society, and government by providing a common platform and foster for a healthy discussion on political reforms, parliamentary activities, policymaking, education, and employment.

=== Leadership Boot Camp ===
The Leadership Boot Camp is a flagship project of Youth Parliament Program (YPP) that focuses on three areas: Policy Development, Sustainable Development Goals, and Technology. This program provides an understanding of contemporary reforms in the world and helps them grab the networking opportunities to facilitate knowledge-sharing, connections, and real-time action on these issues.

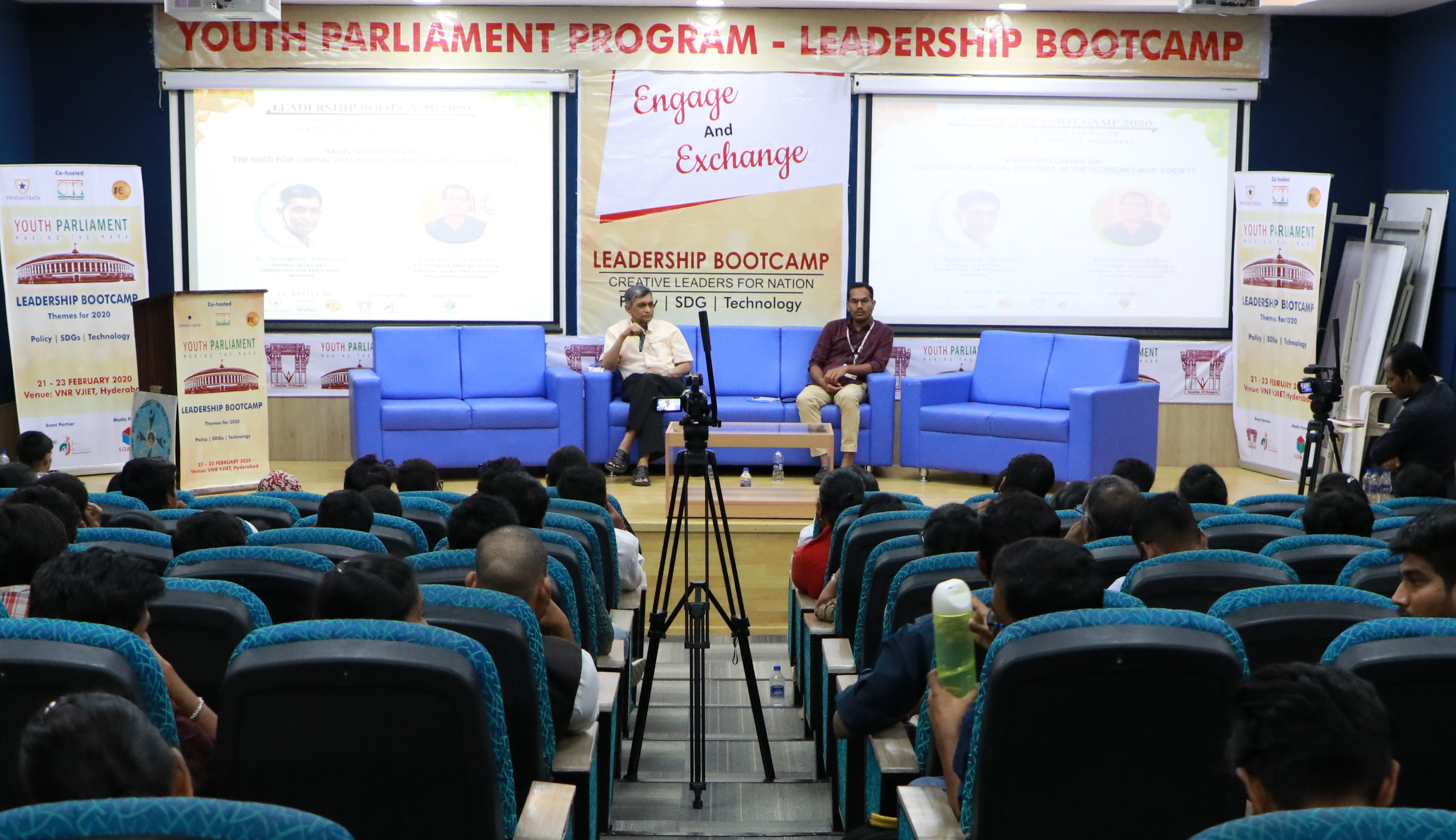
Keynote speech by Raghavendar Askani and Dr. Jayaprakash Narayan in Leadership Bootcamp
