= Bangalore Political Action Committee =

Indian non-profit

- Abbreviation: B.PAC
- Formation: 2013; 13 years ago
- Founders: Kiran Mazumdar Shaw; T. V. Mohandas Pai
- Type: Non-profit
- Headquarters: Bengaluru, Karnataka
- Location: India
- Website: bpac.in

Bangalore Political Action Committee (stylised as B.PAC) is a Bengaluru-based non-profit organisation, founded by the citizens of Bengaluru, to help improve urban infrastructure, municipal governance, and the overall quality of life. The organisation advocates good governance practices and citizen participation for sustainable development. It is primarily a think-tank that carries out research and recommends policy amendments to assist the local and state level governments.

B.PAC works with the government of Karnataka and other government and non-government organisations. It is not affiliated with any political party or government organisation. B.PAC's extent of work also includes supporting women and children welfare, political leadership, and urban traffic management.

== Programs and initiatives ==
B.ENGAGED, a program by B.PAC, was started in 2019 to engage with corporators, government institutions, and citizen groups to advance good governance practices.

B.CLIP, which stands for B.PAC Civic Leadership Incubator Program, is an initiative by B.PAC in collaboration with Takshashila Institution. This program serves as a learning platform for aspiring BBMP corporators, providing them with knowledge and skills to broaden their impact. Since its inception in 2013, nine batches have been conducted. Notable individuals, including politicians and civic activists such as Sowmya Reddy and Sampath Ramanujam, have participated in the B.CLIP program.

B.SAFE, one of the programs by B.PAC, works towards enhancing safety and empowerment for women and children in Bengaluru. The B.SAFE Constituency initiative, a part of B.SAFE, works with B.SAFE Ambassadors to conduct audits of public spaces in Bengaluru. These assessments focus on evaluating the presence of adequate safety infrastructure for women and children. So far, B.SAFE Constituency Initiative has been conducted in 4 Bengaluru assembly constituencies - Mahadevapura, Malleshawaram, Dasarahalli, and Hebbal.

== Founders and members ==
B.PAC was founded in 2013 by Kiran Mazumdar Shaw and T. V. Mohandas Pai to tackle the garbage crisis in Bengaluru, and is currently headed by Revathy Ashok as its Managing Trustee and CEO.

Harish Bijoor, R.K. Misra, and Prasad Bidapa, are members of B.PAC.

Ashwin Mahesh has also been associated with B.PAC.

== Awards and recognition ==
On National Voters' Day 2020, B.PAC was recognised as "The best Not for Profit" by the Election Commission of India for electoral awareness initiatives during 2019 Lok Sabha Elections.
