= Students for Liberty =

Libertarian students organization

Coordinates: 38.9041°N 77.0381°W

- Founded: July 24, 2008
- Founders: Alexander McCobin, Sloane Frost, Richard Tracy, Sam Eckman, and Pin-Quan Ng
- Type: 501(c)(3) public charity
- Tax ID no.: 943435899
- Purpose: Civil society, civic engagement and social entrepreneurship
- Location: 1750 Tysons Boulevard, Suite 1500, McLean, Virginia, 22102
- Region served: International
- Method: Education and leadership programs
- Key people: Wolf von Laer (CEO)
- Website: studentsforliberty.org

Students for Liberty (SFL) is an international libertarian 501(c)(3) non-profit organization with origins in the United States. Formed in 2008, SFL had grown to a network of 1,000 student organizations worldwide by 2014.

It hosts an annual international conference and various regional conferences. Wolf von Laer became the chief executive officer in 2016. The organization is headquartered in McLean, Virginia.

== History ==
On July 24, 2007, students in an Institute for Humane Studies Koch Summer Fellowship met to discuss challenges faced by classical liberal student organizations. In 2008, Alexander McCobin and Sloane Frost organized a conference for 40 students involved in libertarian student groups. The first Students for Liberty conference was held at Columbia University from February 22 to 24, 2008, with 100 student participants. Afterward, they formed Students for Liberty to provide continuing support to student groups.

The group's stated mission is "to educate, develop, and empower the next generation of leaders of liberty." Wolf von Laer, CEO of Students for Liberty, has said that college campuses are "breeding grounds for socialism."

=== In the news ===
Internationally, Students for Liberty has been noted by outlets such as Le Figaro, Die Welt, The Guardian, Le Soir, City A.M., 20Minutos, and Huffington Post Canada.

SFL provided training and leadership development to members of the Free Brazil Movement, a Brazilian civil society organization active during the 2015-2016 political crisis.

A spinoff of SFL, the Consumer Choice Center, was noted for its pro-vaping advocacy through the World Vapers' Alliance.

== Programs ==
=== Local Coordinator Program ===
The organization's principal campus program is the Local Coordinator Program, in which student volunteers organize events and recruit at their own institutions.

=== Conferences ===
SFL's annual conference was originally held as the International Students for Liberty Conference (ISFLC). The inaugural ISFLC in 2008 brought 100 students from 42 schools in three countries to New York City. The second ISFLC in 2009 brought 153 students from 13 countries to George Washington University. The third ISFLC took place February 13–14, 2010 at American University in Washington, D.C., and had more than 300 students in attendance. The fourth ISFLC, covered by ReasonTV, returned to George Washington University on Friday, February 18–20, 2011, this time with 500 students participating. This international conference included a taping of Stossel, which aired March 31, in which John Stossel and Cato Institute Vice President David Boaz spoke. The 2012 ISFLC brought over 1,000 students. The following year, the conference attracted 1,406 attendees.

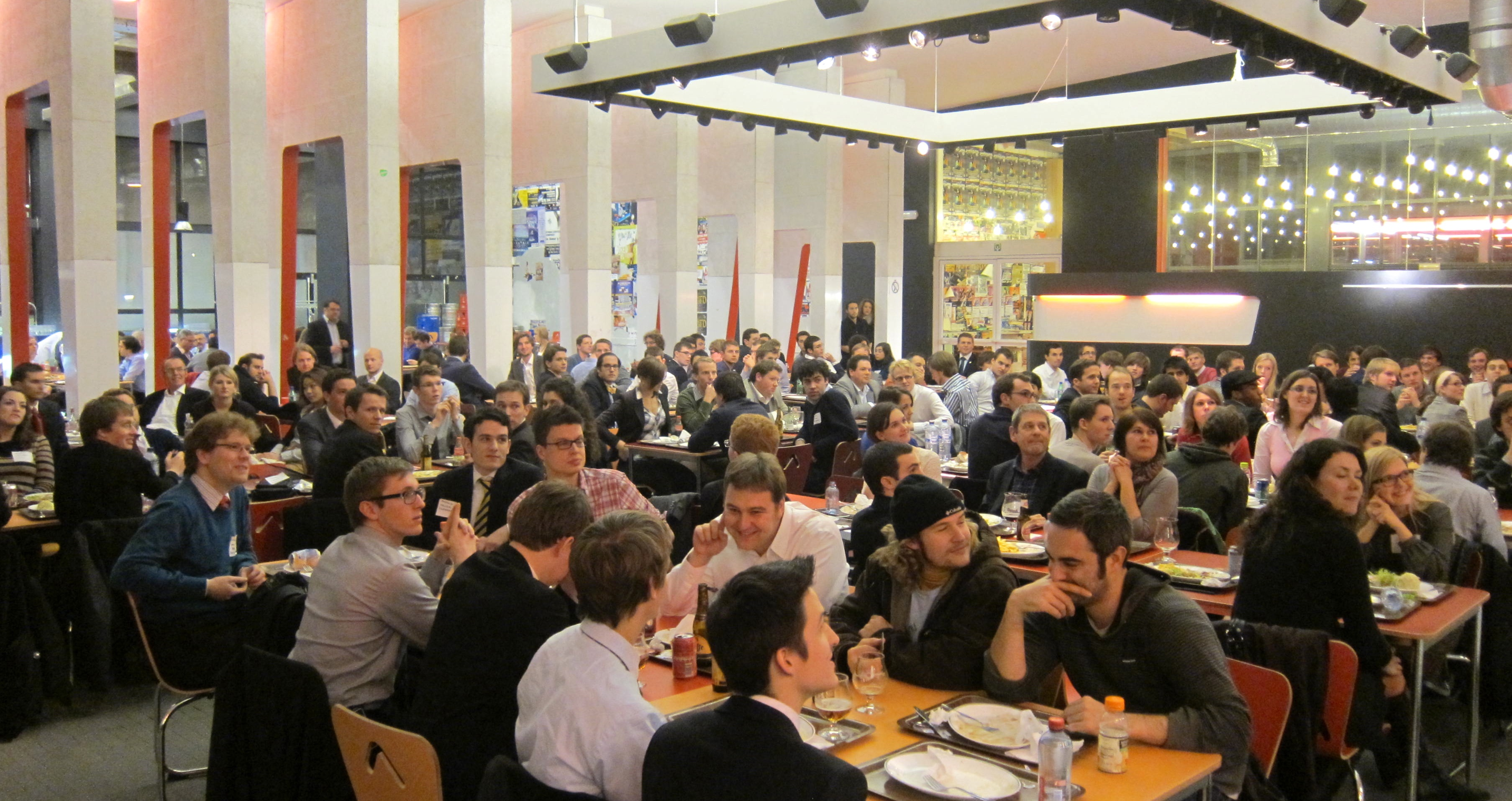
Participants at the first Students for Liberty European conference at the Katholieke Universiteit Leuven

During the fall semester, SFL hosts regional conferences on campuses across the world. On November 18 to 20, 2011, SFL hosted the first European conference at the Katholieke Universiteit Leuven in Leuven, Belgium with over 200 students from 25 different countries attending. In 2013–2014, SFL hosted over 30 regional conferences in North America, Brazil, the Spanish-speaking Americas, and in Africa with over 5,000 student attendees. In the fiscal year 2017, Students for Liberty reported that its conferences were in total attended by over 19,800 students.

By 2018 the conference was being held under the name LibertyCon, drawing around 1,500 attendees in Washington, D.C. The international edition, LibertyCon International, was most recently held in Washington, D.C., on February 7–8, 2025. Regional editions have been held under the LibertyCon name, including LibertyCon Europe, held in Madrid on April 24–26, 2026.

=== Alumni for Liberty ===
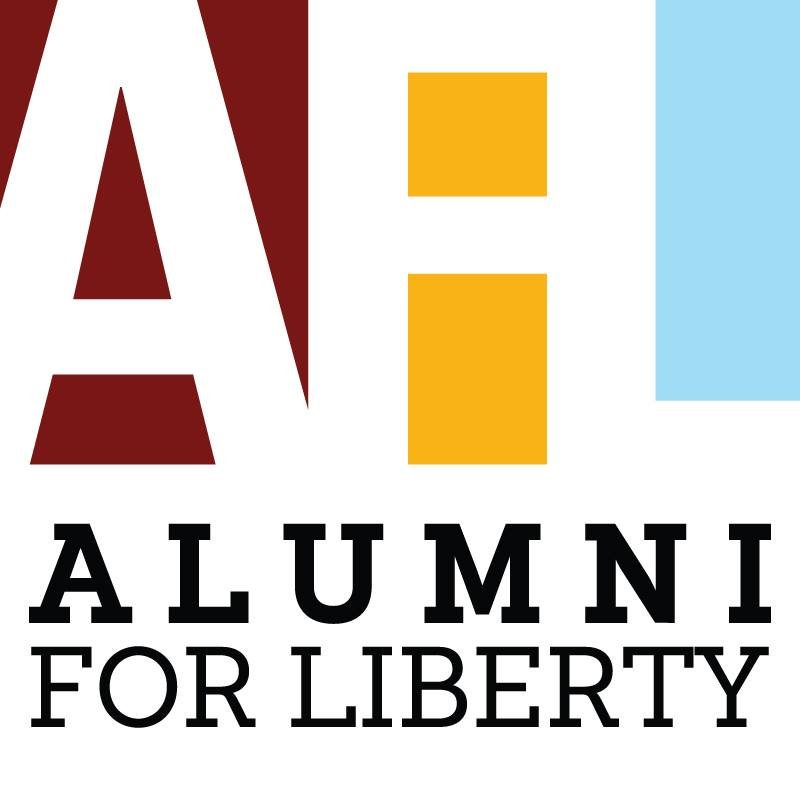
Alumni for Liberty logo

Alumni for Liberty is a network of working professionals interested in supporting students and student organizations dedicated to libertarianism. The program is open to all adults interested in supporting the student movement, whether or not they were a member of a liberty oriented student group. The project provides ways to remain involved in supporting the student movement for liberty with monthly updates describing opportunities such as networking events, job openings, training sessions, leadership dinners, options for financial support of alma mater student groups, speaking to student groups, and mentoring of students interested in related careers.

=== Young Voices ===
Young Voices was launched in 2013 and transitioned into its own standalone 501(c)(3) led by Casey Given as executive director. Young Voices functions as a nonprofit public relations operation, promoting the viewpoints of libertarian writers who apply and are accepted into the program.

== Organizational structure ==
SFL is a 501(c)(3) organization that supports student groups advocating classical liberalism. SFL is headquartered in McLean, Virginia.

A notable member of the board of directors is former WholeFoods CEO John Mackey.

=== North America ===
Students for Liberty got its start in North America and has grown tremendously ever since. In the 2013–2014 school year, 2,721 students attended SFL's 18 fall North American regional conferences. 1,275 students attended the 6th annual International Students for Liberty Conference in Washington, D.C., on February 14–16, 2014.

In 2018, more than 65,000 people worldwide attended SFL conferences, seminars, and training sessions, compared to 56,000 in the previous 10 years combined.

=== Europe ===
In 2011, SFL established an executive board to expand their programs into Europe. On November 18–20, 2011 SFL hosted the first European Students for Liberty Conference (ESFLC) at the Katholieke Universiteit Leuven in Leuven, Belgium. A second conference on the same location was held on March 8–10, 2013. In 2013, a total of 1,234 people attended 10 fall regional conferences across the continent. In March 2014, the third annual ESFLC was held in the German capital Berlin at the Humboldt University of Berlin, which attracted 560 attendees from 28 countries.

In March 2016, European Students for Liberty held its annual conference at Charles University in Prague, Czech Republic for over 900 people with the theme "Students We Should Remember."

=== Spanish-speaking Americas ===
In the spring of 2013, SFL launched Estudiantes por la Libertad, the Regional Executive Board for the Spanish-speaking Americas. The first Estudiantes por la Libertad Conference was held in Santiago, Chile from October 25–27 for 100 attendees.

In Bolivia, Estudiantes por la Libertad Bolivia was founded by the "charter team" members Roberto Ortiz and Luis Sergio Calbimonte in Santa Cruz de la Sierra, Bolivia, starting with a group of 20 members in 2013 and reaching almost a thousand young activist in different events through the years including a co-organized event with the Literature Nobel Prize winner Mario Vargas Llosa. The starter group was built with students of the Private University (UPSA) of Santa Cruz and NUR University.

=== Africa ===
African Students for Liberty (ASFL) ran the first West African Regional Conference on July 26–27, 2013 at the University of Ibadan, Nigeria and brought out 352 participants—SFL's largest ever first-time conference. ASFL organized the first East African Regional Conference in Nairobi, Kenya on May 9–10, 2014 and launched a Local Coordinator program the same year. In 2018, SFL acquired African Liberty, a platform that promotes individual and economic freedom in Africa, from Atlas Network. The platform is managed and edited by Ibrahim B. Anoba.

=== South Asia ===
South Asia Students for Liberty became an official SFL Regional Executive Board in 2014. Venkatesh geriti, Kiran Reddy Avuthu, and Raghavendar askani played a pivotal role in launching Students for Liberty activities in Andhra Pradesh and later headed the South India chapter, coordinating libertarian outreach, events, and advocacy for policies supporting economic freedom in India from 2013.

=== Asia-Pacific ===
Asia-Pacific Students for Liberty was launched in 2016.

=== Brazil ===
Students for Liberty became an official SFL Regional Executive Board with 1037 Local Coordinators.

== Finance ==
Incorporated as a 501(c)(3) non-profit organization, SFL accepts only private donations from individuals, foundations, and participation fees. During its first year, SFL raised fifty thousand dollars in revenue. The organization's revenue grew, realizing almost a quarter of a million dollars in the second year, then over one-half million dollars in the third year. Expenses ran 65% of revenue in the first year, 75% of revenue in the second year, and 80% of revenue in the third year. In its sixth year, SFL's expenses increased from $1.4 million to $2.6 million, and revenue increased from $1.9 million to $2.9 million. For the fiscal year ending in April 2024, the organization reported total revenue of $5,112,524 and total expenses of $6,920,806. For the fiscal year ending in April 2025, it reported total revenue of $5,821,196 and total expenses of $6,326,705.

The organization has received financial support from billionaires David Koch and Charles Koch and related groups such as the Cato Institute.

== See also ==
- Liberal Flemish Students' Union
