= Kundan Lal Gupta =

Indian businessman

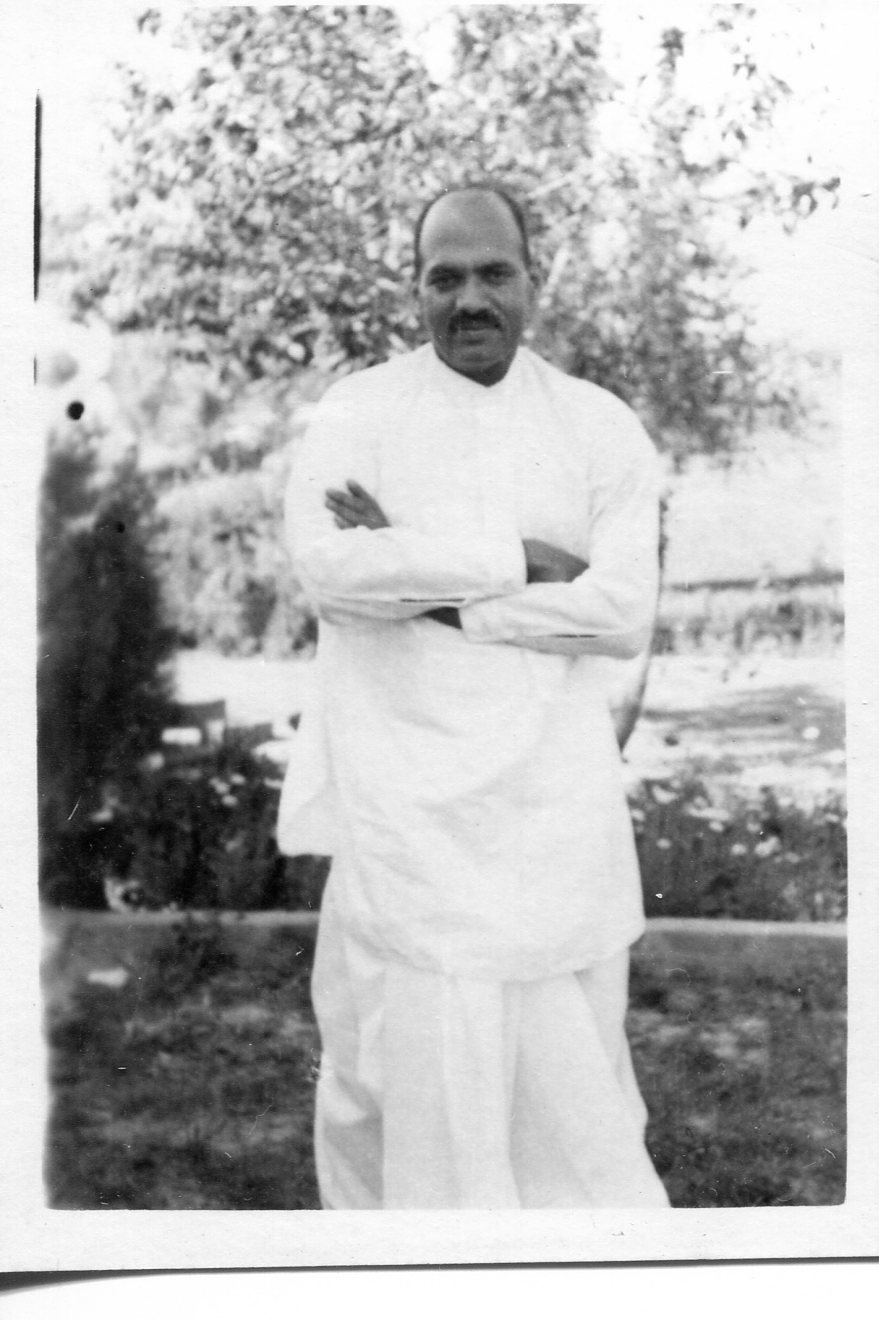
- Born: Ludhiana, Punjab

Kundan Lal Gupta (1893 – 1966) was an Indian businessman, freedom fighter, philanthropist and founder of Kundan Vidya Mandir, one of the first girls' schools in Ludhiana.

== Early life ==
Kundan Lal was born in the year 1893 in Ludhiana, Punjab, to a Patwari father. He completed his BSc degree from Government College, Punjab University, Lahore, in pre-partition India. He was directly admitted to the Provincial Civil Service in 1915 and appointed as a Sub Divisional Magistrate in Nagpur. In 1920, he met Jawaharlal Nehru during the non-cooperation movement launched by the Congress Party. Resigning from PCS he returned to Ludhiana and started a number of Business ventures including the Kundan Wood Factory.

== Freedom Fighter ==
In 1926 Kundan Lal joined the Congress Party to support Indian independence and hosted the landmark All India States People Conference Ludhiana, in February 1939, better known as the “Ludhiana Session” which was attended by Pandit Jawahar Lal Nehru and P. Sitaramayya.

== Philanthropy ==
With India's independence in 1947, Kundan Lal turned his attention to educating a generation of Indians. He started a charitable trust, Shri Kundan Lal Trust, and donated most of his assets to it. He started Kundan Vidya Mandir in 1941, initially as a girls-only school, and converted it to a co-educational school around 1958. Kundan Vidya Mandir now boasts of 2 Campuses in Ludhiana and Kundan International School in Chandigarh.

== Humanitarian ==
On a trip to Vienna, Austria, for a medical procedure in 1938 he saw the plight of Jews under Hitler's tyranny and helped rescue 14 Jews out of Austria. Grandson Vinay Gupta has written a book about his grandfather's humanitarian work.

== Personal life ==
He had five children with his wife, Saraswati. He died in 1966 at the age of 73 from a heart attack.
