= V. Ramachandran =

Indian civil servant (1931–2015)

- Born: 21 March 1931; Tamil Nadu india
- Died: 1 December 2015 (aged 84); Bengaluru, Karnataka, India
- Occupations: Civil servant Management expert
- Years active: 1953–2015
- Known for: Indian Administrative Service
- Spouse: Padma Ramachandran
- Awards: Padma Bhushan

V. Ramachandran (21 March 1931 – 1 December 2015) was an Indian civil servant, management expert and the chief secretary of the state of Kerala. He was a member of the Kerala State Planning Board and held the vice-chair of the United Nations Committee on Right to Development from 1980 to 1984. He also served several United Nations agencies such as UNESCAP, UNCHS, United Nations Economic and Social Council (UNESC), and UNDP as a consultant, and was the chairman of the Centre for Management Development, Thiruvanathapuram at the time of his death in 2015. The Government of India awarded him the third highest civilian honour of the Padma Bhushan, in 2008, for his contributions to Indian civil service.

== Biography ==
Second ARC resolution

V. Ramachandran was born in the south Indian state of Kerala, on 21 March 1931, and obtained his master's degree in Arts (MA) and Sciences (MSc) from the University of Madras before securing a master's degree in Public Administration from Harvard University. He entered the Indian Administrative Service in 1953 to start a 36-year-long civil service which lasted until 1989, during which time he held several positions of note in the central and state administrations. After the initial postings, he served as a district collector, Finance Secretary and the chairman of such public sector undertakings as Kerala State Electricity Board, Kerala State Industrial Development Corporation, prior to his posting as the Chief Secretary of the state, a post he held until his superannuation in 1989. In between, he also had two stints outside Kerala cadre; the first as a Joint Secretary at the Prime Minister's secretariat during the tenures of Indira Gandhi and Morarji Desai from 1972 to 1978, with the responsibility of science and technology and economic affairs and the second as the vice-chairman of the United Nations Committee on Right to Development from 1980 to 1984.

After his retirement from civil service, Ramachandran was again called to government service in 1991 as the Advisor to the Governor of Tamil Nadu when Karunanidhi government was dismissed by Chandra Sekhar, the then Prime Minister and President's rule was imposed in the state. With the lifting of President's rule on 24 June 1991, he was relieved of the duty and the Government of Kerala invited him to accept the position of the vice-chairman of Kerala State Planning Board, a post holding the rank of a cabinet minister; he had earlier served the Board as a member during his civil service years. He held the post until 1996 and after a gap of 5 years, he again returned to the position in 2001 for another term which lasted until 2006. It was during this period, he drafted a report on democratic decentralisation which was reported to have earned him the moniker, father of democratic decentralisation in India. He chaired an Expert Group on Participatory Planning which deliberated on the concept of Panchayati Raj and proposed measures which was later taken up by the state as well as other regions in India. While serving as the vice-chair of the Planning Board during his first term, he also served as the director of Rajiv Gandhi Foundation (1992–1996) and as a member of its Task Force on Panchayati Raj.

As a consultant, Ramachandran was associated with several UN agencies which included United Nations Economic and Social Commission for Asia and the Pacific, United Nations Human Settlements Programme, United Nations Economic and Social Council and United Nations Development Programme. He was a member of the National Dairy Development Board and the Governing Board of Institute of Rural Management Anand and sat in the Central Water Commission and the second Administrative Reforms Commission of the Government of India, the last of which he chaired for a while when Veerappa Moily resigned from the post in 2009. He was a member of the governing board of the Centre for Development Studies and Sree Uthradam Thirunal Institute Of Culture and served as the president of the Regional Cancer Association, Thiruvananthapuram and as the chairman of the Centre for Management Development, Thiruvananthapuram.

Ramachandran was a recipient of the third highest Indian civilian honor of the Padma Bhushan which he received in 2008. He was married to Padma Ramachandran, one of the first woman Indian Administrative Service officers and the first woman chief secretary of Kerala. Towards the later days of his life, the couple resided in Bengaluru and it was here, he died on 1 December 2015, aged 84, from old age.

== See also ==
- Kerala State Planning Board
- Administrative Reforms Commission
