= Venkatesh Geriti =

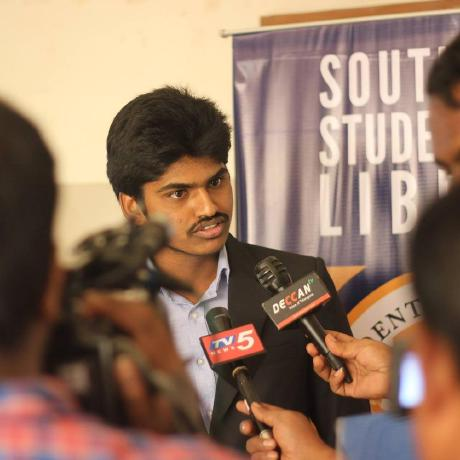
- Venkatesh Geriti in 2015
- Born: Hyderabad, India
- Other name: Venkateswarlu Geriti
- Education: Bachelor of Technology
- Occupations: Social entrepreneur and Tech professional
- Organization: Swatantrata Center
- Known for: Anti-Corruption Activism
- Awards: Karmaveer Chakra Award

Venkatesh Geriti is an Indian classical liberal, anti-corruption activist, and social entrepreneur. He is the founder of Swatantrata Center and India's Future Foundation, an educational organization in Hyderabad, and a scholar at Atlas Summit. Venkatesh received the Karmaveer Chakra Award and Global Fellowship Award in 2019 from the International Confederation of Non-Governmental Organizations in partnership with United Nations . He is a member of the Centre for Civil Society and an alumnus of Foundation for Economic Education., Students For Liberty, Friedrich Naumann Foundation, Liberty International, Atlas Network

== Early life and career ==
Venkatesh was born into a poor family of farmers in Nellore, Andhra Pradesh. He was the co-organizer and speaker at Start-Up Europe Week 2017 while he studied international business and development economics in Italy.

== Politics ==
Venkatesh is influenced by Nagabhairava Jaya Prakash Narayana and joined Lok Satta Party in his student life. Venkatesh actively engages with the European liberal political party Alliance of Liberals and Democrats for Europe Party and European Liberal Youth as an Individual member. He did campaign for More Europe in 2018 Italian general election and Free Democratic Party (Germany) and Its Youth wing Young Liberals (Germany) in 2017 German federal election and 2019 European Parliament election.

== Activism ==
Geriti was one of the founders of Youth for Better India, an anti-corruption youth organization that educates and organizes young people for supporting anti-corruption institutions and governance reforms. He was actively involved in the 2011 Indian anti-corruption movement in the South Indian states of Andhra Pradesh and Telangana.

Venkatesh has represented Indian organizations in various international conferences in countries like the United States, China, Germany, Italy, Sri Lanka, Indonesia, Malaysia, and Nepal.

He is a panel member of Liberty International World Conference.

== Awards and achievements ==
- Karmaveer Chakra Award and Global Fellowship Award 2019 by the International Confederation of Non-Governmental Organizations and the United Nations
- Delhi Youth Award 2017 by India Youth Foundation
- "20 Years and 20 Champions" by Centre for Civil Society
