= Ashwin Mahesh =

Indian politician and journalist

Dr. Ashwin Mahesh
- Education: PhD
- Alma mater: Vidya Mandir Senior Secondary School, Army School, Bangalore, St. Joseph's College, Bangalore, DMS Pondicherry University, Vanderbilt University, University of Washington,
- Occupations: Technologist, journalist, entrepreneur, politician
- Known for: Urban Development, Social technology, Public Interest Media
- Political party: Aam Aadmi Party (currently); Lok Satta Party
- Movement: India Against Corruption
- Spouse: Sapana Rawat
- Children: Aditi and Mahiti.
- Awards: Ashoka Fellow (2009)
- @ashwinmahesh on Twitter
- Website: ashwinmahesh.in

Ashwin Mahesh is an urbanist, journalist, politician and social technologist based in Bangalore. After his education in atmospheric science (PhD) and astronomy (MS), he worked as a climate scientist at NASA before switching to a career in urban development across state, market and society. He is a co-founder of the public affairs journal, India Together. He also co-founded the social technology firm, Mapunity in 2006, and the electric vehicles-based transportation company, Lithium, in 2014. He is currently the CEO of his latest initiative, LVBL Accelerator, founded in 2023.

He was a prominent member of the Loksatta movement working for administrative, electoral and governance reforms, and thereafter became the National Vice President of the Lok Satta Party. In July 2016, when the party decided to quit electoral politics, he resigned his position, and began to work closely with the Aam Aadmi Party. He is also a founder member of Bangalore Political Action Committee (BPAC). Ashwin Mahesh was awarded the Ashoka Fellowship in 2009

== Personal life ==
Ashwin Mahesh did his schooling at Army High School, Bengaluru and Vidya Mandir Senior Secondary School (1986), Chennai and then studied Physics at St Joseph's College of Arts and Science (1989). Later, he got an MBA from Pondicherry University (1991), a masters degree in astronomy from Vanderbilt University (1993) and a PhD from the University of Washington (1999) studying Antarctic clouds and climate. He is married to Sapana Rawat and has two daughters, Aditi and Mahiti. He returned to Bangalore in 2004.

== Career ==
Ashwin Mahesh was a research faculty at NASA Goddard Earth Science and Technology Centre in USA. During his Masters studies at Vanderbilt University guided by David Weintraub, he helped develop a technique for discovering newly forming stars, and this was used to discovered a star, known as 'the companion to LkHα 234'. From 1993 to 2005, he was an atmospheric scientist studying clouds and snow in Antarctica with Stephen Warren, and later working on satellite-based cloud detection technologies. His PhD and subsequent work helped improve algorithms for cloud detection over snow and ice-covered surfaces, and this was later confirmed by the launch of the first space-borne laser by the Geoscience Laser Altimeter Satellite mission team that he was part of.

After returning from the US, Ashwin became a researcher at IIM, Bangalore and at the CiSTUP in IISc. He was also an adjunct faculty member at International Institute of Information Technology, Bangalore. and Urban Research Strategist at the Office of Urban Affairs for the Karnataka government. Ashwin become a driving force behind numerous urban development projects in Bangalore including rationalisation of the BMTC bus service, traffic management solutions, cleaning up and preservation of lakes. He was also part of the Agenda for Bengaluru Infrastructure and Development Task Force (ABIDe).

Ashwin has founded a number of social enterprises. In 2023 he founded LVBL Accerelator as a neighbourhood improvement company focused on sustainability and quality of life. Prior to this, he founded several initiatives and institutions. He was listed in The Smart List 2012: 50 people whose ideas will change the world by Wired UK. He was awarded the Ashoka Fellowship for Social Development. In 1998, he co-founded India Together, an online magazine that covers public affairs, policy and development in India. He co-founded and led Mapunity, a social tech platform for urban development challenges in India. In October 2014, he co-founded India's first 100% Electric Vehicles-based transportation service, Lithium. In 2022 and began working on the launch of LVBL and also began teaching a course on public problem solving at the Kautilya School of Public Policy.

During the second wave of the COVID-19 pandemic in 2021, Ashwin helped create the #CovidRural volunteer group in 100+ districts across several states that worked with district and taluk hospitals to help them find donors for new infrastructure, medical devices and supplies. The How Institute also began working on an initiative to make CSR funding in India more impactful. He is also interested in heritage and history, and is part of the Kaliloka team documenting the vernacular architectural traditions of the different districts of Karnataka. Ashwin is a childhood polio survivor, and was a Director at Artilab Foundation for a few years; the organisation incubates product and service innovations for disabled and elderly persons. He is also an advisor to Fourth Wave Foundation, which runs the Nanagu Shaale program for full inclusion of disabled children in schools.

In 2022, he began teaching a course on public problem solving at Kautilya School of Public Policy in Hyderabad. Since then he has been advocating that colleges should focus sharply on skills and training that the majority of the public needs, rather than only serving 10% or less who seek professional careers. In June 2024 he proposed that the UGC should start a Bachelors in General Competence, comprising a set of ten modules or more with this goal in mind.

Dr.Mahesh has written for a number of news publications and has been a regular columnist in the Deccan Herald since 2019.

=== Political career ===
Ashwin Mahesh was associated with the anti-corruption initiative, Corruption Saaku, since its inception, and later played an active role as it grew into India Against Corruption (IAC)'s demand for the Lokpal Bill. Ashwin ran his first political campaign in 2012 for the upper house of the Karnataka assembly, which he finished fourth. He said he contested mainly to demonstrate that people from non-political backgrounds could challenge conventional career politicians. He had started many initiatives called Missed Call Campaign to raise awareness and increase the number of registered voters before the MLC elections. He had enrolled more than 15,000 voters, but ended up with only 4,349 votes in the Bangalore graduates' constituency elections. Bangalore Mirror newspaper noted, if every one of the voters Mr Mahesh enrolled for voting had turned up to cast their ballot on election day, he would have won by a thumping majority'.

In 2013, Karnataka Legislative Assembly elections, Ashwin Mahesh contested from the Bommanahalli constituency, garnered 11,915 votes and finished third. The Bangalore Political Action Committee (B.PAC), an initiative which was launched by the business community of the IT capital of the nation, endorsed Ashwin in the Bommanahalli constituency. He secured 6.75 per cent of the total votes polled, beating even the Janata Dal(JDS) and Karnataka Janata Paksha (KJP) candidates.

During the 2015 city elections, and 2018 state elections, he was active in campaigning for Aam Aadmi Party. In 2022, he became the head of the Manifesto Committee of AAP Karnataka for the BBMP elections. The party introduced the Nammoora Charche dialogue with voters to create the manifesto, similar to the Delhi Dialogue it had used in elections there.
