= Madhavaram Krishna Rao =

Indian politician

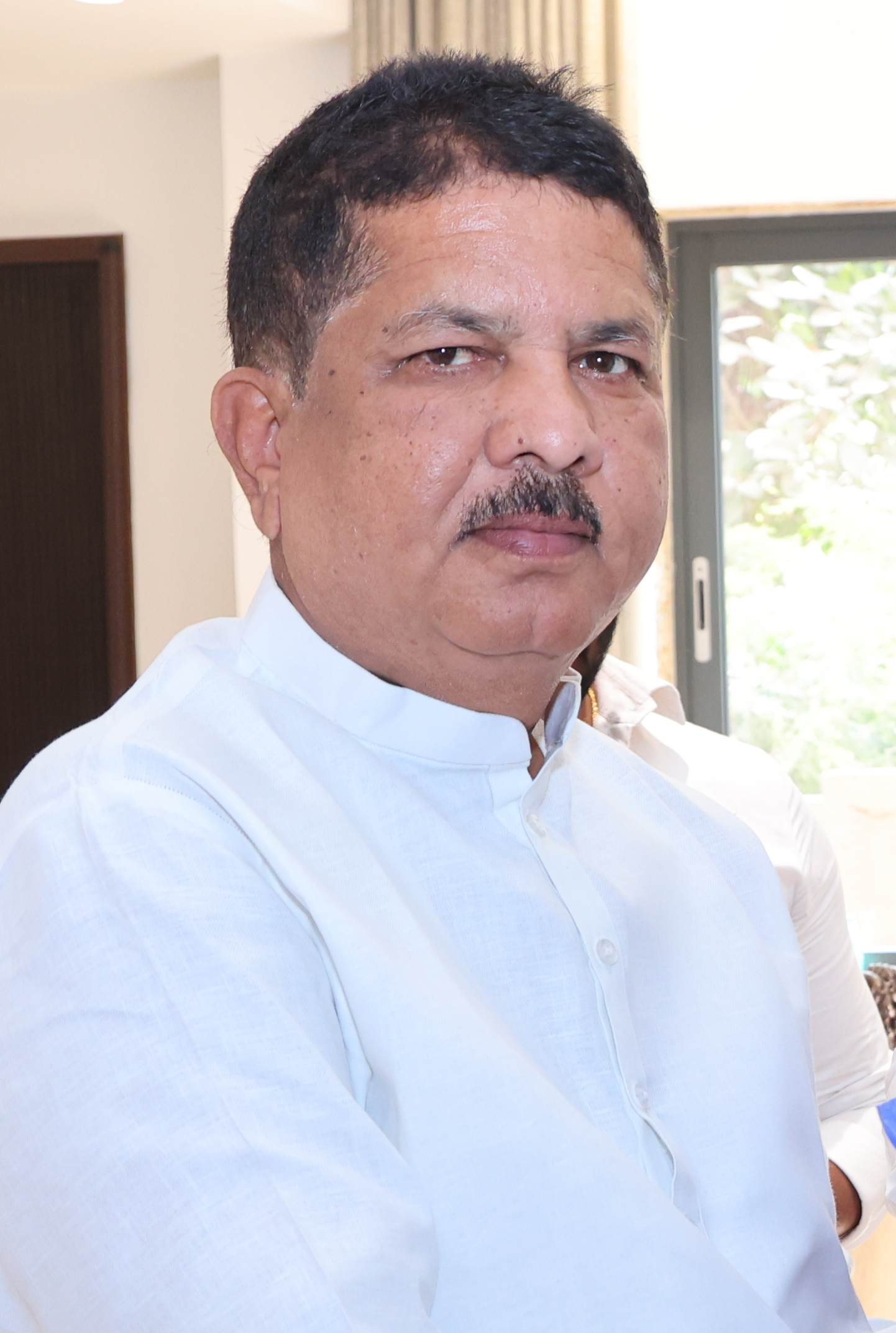

Member of Legislative Assembly, Telangana
- Incumbent
- Assumed office 2 June 2014
- Preceded by: Telangana Assembly Created
- Constituency: Kukatpally

Personal details
- Born: 19 February 1967 (age 59) Kukatpally, Telangana, India
- Party: Bharat Rashtra Samithi
- Spouse: Lakshmi Bai Madhavaram
- Children: A Daughter and a Son

Madhavaram Krishna Rao (born 19 February 1967) is an Indian politician belonging to the Bharat Rashtra Samithi. He represents Kukatpally Assembly constituency.

== Early life ==
Madhavaram Krishna Rao was born in Kukatpally, Ranga Reddy District to Narayana Rao and Sakku Bai. Before joining TRS Mr. Rao was part of Telugu Desam Party from the Party inception.

== Political career ==
Madhavaram Krishna Rao was elected from the Kukatpally Assembly constituency in 2014 at the age of 46 in the Telangana state from Telugu Desam Party. He also served as Vice chairman GHMC Kukatpally.

== Personal life ==
Madhavaram Krishna Rao is married to Laxmi Bai and has two children. Mr. Rao has 2 younger brothers and 1 elder sister. Krishna Rao has good command over languages like Telugu, Hindi and English. He lives with his family at Kukatpally.
