= Lok Satta Movement =

Indian democratic reform movement

Lok Satta Movement

Lok Satta is a non-partisan movement for democratic reforms in the country of India, led by Dr. Jayaprakash Narayan, a former I. A. S. officer and renowned activist from Andhra Pradesh, India. The movement was started in 1996 with the founding of Lok Satta, a non-governmental organization. In 2006, the movement transformed into Lok Satta Party.

== Introduction ==
The group declared to form a political party and contest in the upcoming elections. Though the movement initially started in Andhra Pradesh, it later spread across the country. Dr. Jayaprakash Narayan says that democracy is for the people, of the people and by the people. Lok Satta is a registered society whose membership is open and available to all Indians. It has district branches and neighbourhood units spread all over Andhra Pradesh. It has over 250,000 members in the state and over 30,000 in the Greater Hyderabad region. While Lok Satta's goals are governance reforms in India, its organizational spread is largely in Andhra Pradesh.

== Activities ==
Apart from creating India’s largest base for a people’s movement in Andhra Pradesh, Lok Satta is now deeply engaged in building a viable national platform for democratic reforms through building alliances in major states and promoting local initiatives, and building an effective and highly credible coalition at the national level specifically for electoral reforms. It has also launched its political party arm in October 2007, which has met with reasonable success.

- Andhra Pradesh Election Watch - Checking the criminal background of politicians in 2001, 2004
- Ensure backward communities are able to vote - 2001

=== Goals ===
- Democratization of political parties to make them open, member-controlled, transparent, and accountable in all aspects.
- Electoral reforms to make elections truly democratic, fair and transparent; to facilitate and promote participation of the best men and women in India's political process; and to curb electoral mal-practices.
- Balanced distribution of functions between the union and the states and local governments, together with allocation of adequate resources and devolution of powers commensurate with their functions.
- Effective decentralization of governance through empowerment of local governments as participative tiers of constitutional, democratic governance, and direct empowerment of people as stakeholders wherever feasible.
- Effective functioning of legislature, executive and judiciary at all levels, with appropriate checks and balances.
- Measures for speedy, efficient, affordable, and accessible justice to people.
- Measures to make bureaucracy truly accountable, responsive, and efficient at all levels.
- Institutional checks to prevent abuse of office, including freedom of information for transparent governance; insulation of crime investigation and prosecution from partisan pulls and political vagaries; creation of an effective, independent anti-corruption mechanism; and creation of an independent mechanism for appointment of constitutional functionaries.

=== Principles ===
According to Lok Satta, the specific reforms derived from the above generic principles must be in conformity with the following basic principles of democracy:

- Freedom
- Self-governance
- Empowerment of citizens
- Rule of law
- Self-correcting institutional mechanisms

== See also ==
- Lok Satta Party
