= Lok Satta Party =

- Leader: Jaya Prakash Narayana
- Chairman: Jaya Prakash Narayana
- Founder: Jaya Prakash Narayana
- Founded: 2 October 2006
- Preceded by: Lok Satta (NGO)
- Headquarters: H.No: 8-2-674B/2/9, Road No: 13A, Banjara Hills; Hyderabad- 500034
- Newspaper: Lok Satta Times
- Youth wing: Yuva Satta
- Women's wing: Mahila Satta
- Ideology: Conservative liberalism Fiscal conservatism Economic liberalism Federalism; Classical liberalism
- Political position: Centre-right
- International affiliation: People For Lok Satta
- Colours: Blue & Red
- ECI status: Unrecognised Political Party
- Seats in Rajya Sabha: 0 / 245
- Seats in Lok Sabha: 0 / 543
- Seats in Karnataka Legislative Assembly: 0 / 224

Website
- www.LokSatta.org

Lok Satta is a classical liberal political party in India, founded by Nagabhairava Jaya Prakash Narayana, a former IAS officer and renowned activist from Andhra Pradesh. Since 1996, the Lok Satta Movement functioned as a non-governmental organisation, but on 2 October 2006, the movement was reorganised into a formal political party. The party intends to further the causes of the Lok Satta Movement, including a reduction in the size of the cabinet, promotion of the Right to Information Act, and disclosure of criminal records and assets by political candidates. Beginning with the 2009 elections the party has adopted a whistle as their official symbol. On 23 March 2016, the party founder president, Jayaprakash Narayan said that they will not take part in electoral politics for sometime.

== History ==
Lok Satta started as a citizen movement, Lok Satta Andolana or Lok Satta Movement, in unified Andhra Pradesh and later spread to few other parts of the country, including Mumbai, with the Vote JUHU and Vote Mumbai campaigns. It also played a major role in the Jaago Re! One Billion Votes. The Lok Satta organisation worked on bringing about several political reforms by working with other civic organisations. Lok Satta Party was founded with the realisation that entering into politics is the only option to bring about fundamental changes in the system and a new political culture. It grew rapidly, amassing over 30,000 members in the Greater Hyderabad region and over 60,000 members in unified Andhra Pradesh before it became a political party.

Lok Satta Party is now active in few Indian states, including Telangana and Andhra Pradesh. It was also active earlier in Karnataka, Maharashtra, Tamil Nadu and Delhi.

== Leadership ==
The party's founder and National President is Jayaprakash Narayan, a former doctor who was an IAS officer in the 1980s from Andhra Pradesh. Narayan resigned from the IAS in 1996 to establish the Lok Satta Movement, and the political party in 2006.

=== National Steering Committee ===
National Steering Committee is the highest body of Lok Satta Party. It is a subset of the National Council of the party.

Leader	Role
Dr. Jayaprakash Narayan	Founder President

Notable past members of the National Steering Committee include Surendra Srivastava, Katari Srinivasa Rao, D.V.V.S. Varma, Dr. Ashwin Mahesh and Dilip Sankarreddy.

=== State units ===
Bheesetti Babji is the President of Andhra Pradesh State unit. Thummanapally Srinivas is the President of Telangana State unit.

== Ideology ==
The political goals of Lok Satta include political, economic, and social equality for all people, making citizens the centre of governance, and to reform the government to make it less corrupt and more accessible and responsible to the people.

== Symbols ==
The Party flag also serves as the Party logo. The dark blue colour symbolises the vastness, depth and inclusive nature of the ocean. The white colour of the circle stands for purity. The colour symbolises unity of purpose and action. The five-pointed blue star signifies the party's course and the five corners of the star stand for what the party argues are the five pillars of a true democracy:

- Liberty
- Self-governance
- Citizen empowerment
- Rule of law
- Self-correcting institutions.

== See also ==
- List of political parties in India
