= Karmaveer Chakra Award =

Award for courage

- Awarded for: Recognising commitment and relentless courage by walking the path less trodden and initiating a wave of change in society.
- Sponsored by: United Nations
- Country: Worldwide
- First award: 1984
- Website: rexideas.com

The Karmaveer Chakra Award is a global civilian honor bestowed to individuals worldwide for their unwavering bravery by the International Confederation of Non governmental Organizations (iCONGO) in collaboration with the United Nations Karmaveer Chakra, the national medallion for proactive voluntary action to Be the Change, was established in 2008–09 by the Indian Confederation of NGOs (iCONGO) in collaboration with the UN. The award is tribute to A. P. J. Abdul Kalam, 11th President of India, who had offered to be the ambassador for the awards and international volunteering olympiad.

== Awards ==
The award is presented annually in mid-November to individuals and organizations across various categories, including activism, education, volunteering, and healthcare and other categories Notable recipients include Lenin Raghuvanshi, Anupam Mittal, Deepika Narayan Bhardwaj, Devika Vaid, Harish Iyer, Jason Fernandes, Shruti Kapoor, Manju Latha Kalanidhi, Anurag Chauhan, Jyoti Dhawale, Gaurav Mishra Kajol, Sudha Menon An award was given to Narayanappa, a farmer who advocates for ecological farming. Raghavendar Askani Liberal political activist awardeed Verghese Kurien, known as father of the white revolution of India, is the first recipient of Karmaveer lifetime achievement award. Tanuj Samaddar, an artist and youth change maker was also awarded the Karmaveer Chakra.

Hierarchy of awards

- Karmaveer Chakra GOLD - Nominations may be proposed and chosen by council of fellows strictly. Self-nominations or nominations by fellows and citizens are not accepted.
- Karmaveer Chakra SILVER - Nominations may be proposed by fellows only and will be chosen at the discretion of the council of fellows. Self-nominations or nominations by citizens are not accepted.
- Karmaveer Chakra BRONZE - Nominations may be proposed by all fellows and citizens of the world. Self-nominations are also welcome. Nominations will be accepted at the discretion of the council of fellows.
- Karmaveer Puraskar.
- Karmaveer Jyoti.
