= Chinese salami slicing strategy =

Foreign policy strategy

China's outposts in the disputed South China Sea are often cited as examples of a "salami slicing" tactic. Map depicts 2015.

China's salami slicing (Note: The strategy has been described using the Chinese term for to nibble. Chinese: 蚕食; pinyin: Cán shí; transl. "nibbling like a silkworm") is a geopolitical strategy involving a series of small steps taken by the government of People's Republic of China that would become a larger fait accompli which would have been difficult or unlawful to perform all at once. When discussing this concept, notedly debated in the publications of the Lowy Institute from Australia, some defenders of the concept are Brahma Chellaney, Jasjit Singh, Bipin Rawat or the Observer Research Foundation from India or the United States Institute of Peace, Bonnie S. Glaser (Center for Strategic and International Studies) or Erik Voeten (The Washington Post) from the US, while detractors are H. S. Panag from India or Linda Jakobson. Advocates of the term have cited examples such as the territorial disputes in the South China Sea and along the Sino-Indian border.

== Modus operandi ==
According to Indian strategist and writer Brahma Chellaney, "salami slicing" rather than overt aggression is China's favored strategy because none of its series of small actions serves as a casus belli by itself. China slices very thinly, camouflaging offense as defense, and eventually gains a larger strategic advantage. This throws its targets off balance by presenting a Hobson’s choice: either silently suffer or risk an expensive and dangerous war with China. This can also place the blame and burden of starting a war on the targets.

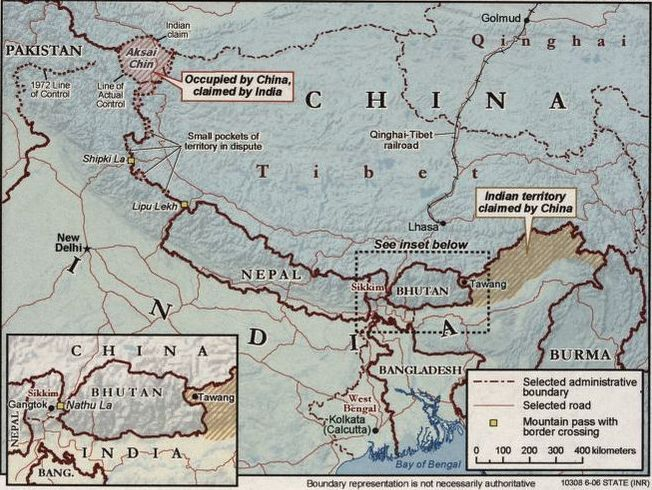
The Line of Actual Control between China and India (map by the CIA)

== Dimensions ==
Proponents of the salami slicing strategy allege that China has used this in political, economic, and military realms.

=== India ===
Indian authors accuse China of using piecemeal claims to expand its territory at India's expense. Brahma Chellaney has cited China's incorporation of Aksai Chin in a step-by-step process between 1952 and 1964, its 2020–2021 border skirmishes with India, and Tajikistan's Pamir Mountains as examples. The Five Fingers of Tibet involving Nepal and Bhutan as well as the String of Pearls in the Indian Ocean have also been described as manifestations of China's salami slicing. Since the 2020-2021 border skirmishes, Indian analysts have used the term salami-slicing to describe Chinese encroachments, in particular Chinese settlements in Tibet near the border.

=== South China Sea ===
China's claimed nine-dash line in red, part of the ongoing territorial disputes in the South China Sea.

According to Chellaney, China expands its exclusive economic zone (EEZ) in the South China Sea at the expense of other nations EEZ through its nine-dash line claims. It took control of the Paracel Islands in 1974, Johnson Reef in 1988, Mischief Reef in 1995, and Scarborough Shoal in 2012. China has installed military infrastructure in these areas and deployed the China Maritime Safety Administration, Fisheries Law Enforcement Command, and the State Oceanic Administration, agencies that Chellaney describes as paramilitary in nature.

=== Extension of the concept ===
Retired Indian Brigadier S. K. Chatterji extended salami slicing in reference to China's Belt and Road Initiative (BRI), Confucius Institute, allegations of technology theft, involvement in the World Health Organization, activities in Hong Kong and Tibet, and diplomatic support for North Korea and Pakistan.

==== BRI and debt-trap diplomacy ====
Some critics have claimed that the Belt and Road Initiative (BRI) is having the effect of pressuring Papua New Guinea, Sri Lanka, Kenya, Djibouti, Egypt, Ethiopia, and other nations who are unable to pay their debts, to hand over their infrastructure and resources to China. According to Chellaney, this is "clearly part of China's geostrategic vision". China's overseas development policy has been called debt trap diplomacy because once indebted economies fail to service their loans, they are said to be pressured into supporting China's geostrategic interests. However, other analysts such as the Lowy Institute argue that the BRI is not the main cause of failed projects, while the Rhodium Group found that "asset seizures are a very rare occurrence", while debt write-off is the most common outcome.

Some governments have accused the Belt and Road Initiative of being "neocolonial" due to what they allege is China's practice of debt trap diplomacy to fund the initiative's infrastructure projects in Pakistan, Sri Lanka and the Maldives. China contends that the initiative has provided markets for commodities, improved prices of resources and thereby reduced inequalities in exchange, improved infrastructure, created employment, stimulated industrialization, and expanded technology transfer, thereby benefiting host countries.

==== Allegations of technology theft ====
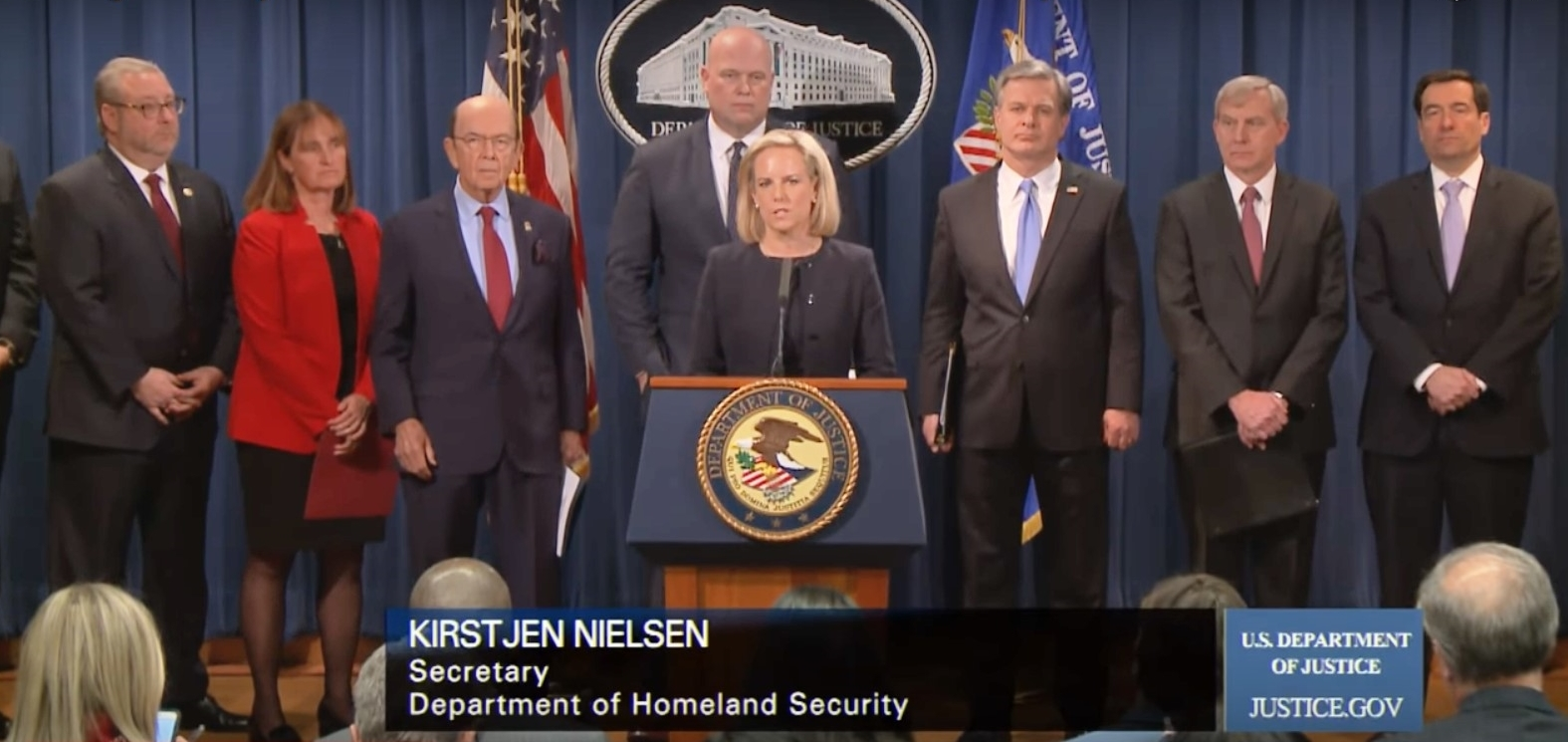
U.S. officials announced 23 criminal charges (Financial Fraud, Money Laundering, Conspiracy to Defraud the United States, Theft of Trade Secret Technology and Sanctions Violations, etc.) against Chinese technology company Huawei.

China is accused by critics of the theft of "cutting-edge technology from global leaders in diverse fields", including U.S. military technology, classified information, and trade secrets of American companies. It uses lawful as well as covert methods, leveraging a network of existing scientific, academic and business contacts such as the Thousand Talents Plan.

The German Federal Ministry of the Interior estimates that Chinese economic espionage could be costing Germany between 20 and 50 billion euros annually. Spies are reportedly targeting mid- and small-scale companies that do not have as strong security regimens as larger corporations.

==== Lobbying and influence operations ====
China is accused of nominating persons to various organizations with the view of influencing the organizational culture and values to the advantage of China's national interests. Examples cited include the promotion of Chinese officials to the UN Food and Agriculture Organization, which critics have claimed advances Chinese national interests. The Confucius Institutes have also been claimed to advance Chinese state interests. China is alleged to have attempted foreign electoral intervention in the domestic political elections of other nations, including in the United States, although these claims have not been supported by evidence., China has been accused of interference in elections on Taiwan, and has been accused of influencing Australian members of Parliament.

Relations between China and Australia deteriorated after 2018 due to growing concerns of Chinese political influence in various sectors of Australian society including in the Government, universities and media as well as China's stance on the South China Sea dispute. Consequently, Australian Coalition Government announced plans to ban foreign donations to Australian political parties and activist groups. Australia has empowered the Australian Security Intelligence Organisation, Australian Federal Police (AFP) and the Attorney-General’s Department to target the China-linked entities and people under new legislation to combat Chinese influence operations, including the alleged deployment of the United Front Work Department of the Chinese Communist Party (CCP).

The United Work Front department is accused of lobbying policy makers outside of China to enact pro-CCP policies, targeting people or entities that are outside the CCP, especially in the overseas Chinese community, who hold social, commercial, or academic influence, or who represent interest groups. Through its efforts, the UFWD seeks to ensure that these individuals and groups are supportive of or useful to CCP interests and potential critics remain divided.

In 2005, a pair of Chinese dissidents claimed that China may have up to 1,000 intelligence agents in Canada. The head of the Canadian Security Intelligence Service Richard Fadden in a television interview implied that various Canadian politicians at provincial and municipal levels had ties to Chinese intelligence, a statement which he withdrew few days later.

== Usage of the phrase ==
- In 1996, a United States Institute of Peace report on the South China Sea dispute writes "[...] analysts point to Chinese 'salami tactics,' in which China tests the other claimants through aggressive actions, then backs off when it meets significant resistance."
- In 2001, Jasjit Singh, IDSA, wrote "Salami-slicing of the adversary's territory where each slice does not attract a major response, and yet the process over a time would result in gains of territory. China's strategy of salami slicing during the 1950s on our northern frontiers [...]".
- In 2012, Robbert Haddick described "salami-slicing," as "the slow accumulation of small actions, none of which is a casus belli, but which add up over time to a major strategic change [...] The goal of Beijing's salami-slicing would be to gradually accumulate, through small but persistent acts, evidence of China's enduring presence in its claimed territory [...]."
- In December 2013, Erik Voeten wrote in a Washington Post article concerning China's salami-tactics with reference to "extension of its air defense zone over the East China Sea" – "The key to salami tactics’ effectiveness is that the individual transgressions are small enough not to evoke a response"– going on to ask, "So how should the United States respond in this case?"
- In January 2014, Bonnie S. Glaser, a China expert in the Center for Strategic and International Studies, made a statement before the US House Armed Services Subcommittee on Seapower and Projection Forces and the House Foreign Affairs Subcommittee on Asia Pacific, "How the US responds to China's growing propensity to use coercion, bullying and salami-slicing tactics to secure its maritime interests is increasingly viewed as the key measure of success of the US rebalance to Asia. [...] China thus seeks to employ a charm offensive with the majority of its neighbors while continuing its salami-slicing tactics to advance its territorial and maritime claims and pressing its interpretation of permissible military activities in its EEZ."
- In March 2014, Darshana M. Baruah, a Junior Fellow at ORF and a nonresident scholar at the Carnegie Endowment for International Peace, wrote "As Beijing's 'salami slicing' strategy is gathering speed it is more important than ever for ASEAN to show it solidarity and stand up to its bigger neighbour, China."
- In India in 2017, the Indian Chief of the Army Staff General Bipin Rawat used the phrase in a statement, "As far as northern adversary is concerned, the flexing of muscle has started. The salami slicing, taking over territory in a very gradual manner, testing our limits of threshold is something we have to be wary about and remain prepared for situations emerging which could gradually emerge into conflict."

== Critique ==
In 2019, retired Indian Lieutenant General H. S. Panag wrote that the phrase "salami slicing" as used "by military scholars as well as Army Chief General Bipin Rawat in relation to the Line of Actual Control — is a misnomer". He argues that whatever territory China needed to annex was done prior to 1962. While there have been territorial claims by China after 1962, they are done more to "embarrass" India rather than a form of "permanent salami slicing".

Linda Jakobson, a political scientist, has argued that rather than salami slicing based territorial expansion and decision making, "China's decision-making can be explained by bureaucratic competition between China's various maritime agencies." Bonnie S. Glaser argues against this view point, saying "bureaucratic competition among numerous maritime actors [...] is probably not the biggest source of instability. Rather, China's determination to advance its sovereignty claims and expand its control over the South China Sea is the primary challenge."

== See also ==
- Cabbage tactics
- East China Sea EEZ disputes
- Foreign policy of China
- Grey-zone (international relations)
- Salami slicing tactics
