= Corruption in India =

Corruption in India is an issue that affects the economy of central, state, and local government agencies and is frequently blamed for hindering the country's economic development. A study conducted by Transparency International in 2020 recorded that 39% of Indians had paid a bribe to a public official to get a job done in the preceding twelve months. In the 2025 Corruption Perceptions Index (released in early 2026), India scored 39 on a scale from 0 ("highly corrupt") to 100 ("very clean") and was ranked 91st out of 182 countries, where the country ranked first is perceived to have the most honest public sector. India's score has fluctuated only slightly (between 36 and 41) since the current version of the Index was introduced in 2012, indicating a perceived lack of significant progress in tackling public sector corruption. For comparison with regional scores, the best score among those countries of the Asia Pacific region that appeared in the 2025 Index (Note: Afghanistan, Australia, Bangladesh, Bhutan, Brunei Darussalam, Cambodia, China, Fiji, Hong Kong, India, Indonesia, Japan, North Korea, South Korea, Laos, Malaysia, Maldives, Mongolia, Myanmar, Nepal, New Zealand, Pakistan, Papua New Guinea, Philippines, Singapore, Solomon Islands, Sri Lanka, Taiwan, Thailand, Timor-Leste, Vanuatu, Vietnam) was 84, the average score was 45 and the worst score was 15. For comparison with worldwide scores, the best score was 89 (ranked 1), the average score was 42, and the worst score was 9 (ranked 181, in a two-way tie).

Various factors contribute to corruption, including officials siphoning money from government social welfare schemes. Examples include the Mahatma Gandhi National Rural Employment Guarantee Act and the National Rural Health Mission. Other areas of corruption include India's trucking industry, which is forced to pay billions of rupees in bribes annually to numerous regulatory and police stops on interstate highways.

The news media has widely published allegations of corrupt Indian citizens stashing millions of rupees in Swiss banks. Swiss authorities denied these allegations, which were later proven in 2015–2016. In July 2021, India's Central Board of Direct Taxes (CBDT) replied to Right To Information (RTI) requests stating undeclared assets of Rs 20,078 crore identified by them in India and abroad following the investigation till June 2021.

The causes of corruption in India include excessive regulations, complicated tax and licensing systems, numerous government departments with opaque bureaucracy and discretionary powers, monopoly of government-controlled institutions on certain goods and services delivery, and the lack of transparent laws and processes. There are significant variations in the level of corruption and in the government's efforts to reduce corruption across India.

== Politics ==
Corruption in India is a problem that has serious implications for protecting the rule of law and ensuring access to justice. As of December 2009, 120 of India's 542 parliament members were accused of various crimes, under India's First Information Report procedure wherein anyone can allege another to have committed a crime.

Many of the biggest scandals since 2010 have involved high-level government officials, including Cabinet Ministers and Chief Ministers, such as the 2010 Commonwealth Games scam (₹70,000 crore (US$7.5 billion)), the Adarsh Housing Society scam, the Mining Scandal in Karnataka, and the Cash for Vote scams along with the Electoral Bond scam. There have also been decades of numerous state and local level scams, for example the Saradha group financial scandal, the Narada sting operation, the Rose Valley financial scandal, the West Bengal teacher recruitment scam, the 2024 Sandeshkhali violence and the 2024 Pune Porsche car crash.

In February 2024, the Supreme Court of India struck down the Electoral Bonds Scheme as unconstitutional, citing that it violated the right to information and facilitated quid pro quo arrangements between corporations and political parties. Data released subsequently by the State Bank of India revealed that several companies under investigation by federal agencies had purchased significant amounts of bonds.

== Lack of accountability ==
A 2021 U.S. State Department report asserts that the law provides criminal penalties for corruption by officials at all levels of government in India. However, there were numerous reports of government corruption during the year. Corruption was present at multiple levels of government in India and officials frequently engaged in corrupt practices with impunity. While investigations and prosecutions of individual cases took place, lax enforcement, a shortage of trained police officers, and an overburdened and under-resourced court system contributed to a low number of convictions.

The corresponding 2023 and 2025 U.S. State Department reports struck a slightly more hopeful note, saying that the government generally implemented anti-corruption laws effectively. However, reports of corruption persisted, both by whistleblowers to the national anti-corruption ombudsman and by NGOs.

All three of the 2021, 2023 and 2025 reports singled out bribes to expedite services such as police protection, school admission, water supply, and government assistance as problem areas.

== Bureaucracy ==
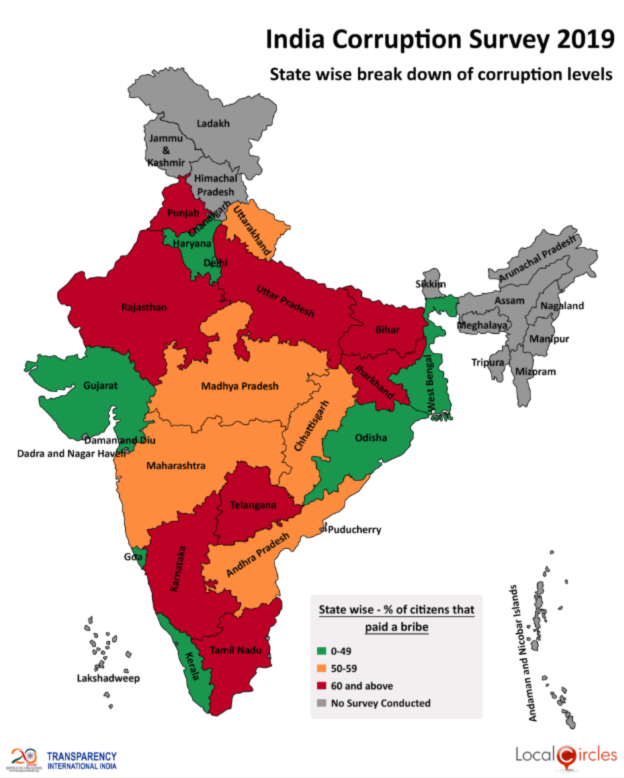
0 - 49 50 - 59 60 and above No survey conducted

=== Bribery ===
A 2005 study done by Transparency International in India found that more than 62% of the people had firsthand experience of paying bribes or peddling influence to get services performed in a public office. Taxes and bribes are common between state borders; Transparency International estimates that truckers annually pay ₹222 crore (US$24 million) in bribes.

Both government regulators and police share in bribe money, to the tune of 43% and 45% each, respectively. The route stoppages at checkpoints and entry points can take up to 11 hours per day. About 60% of these (forced) stoppages on roads by concerned authorities such as government regulators, police, forest, sales and excise, octroi and weighing and measuring departments are for extorting money. The loss in productivity due to these stoppages is an important national concern; the number of truck trips could increase by 40%, if forced delays are avoided. According to a 2007 World Bank published report, the travel time for a Delhi-Mumbai trip could be reduced by about two days per trip if the corruption and associated regulatory stoppages to extract bribes were eliminated.

A 2009 survey of the leading economies of Asia, revealed Indian bureaucracy is not only the least efficient among Singapore, Hong Kong, Thailand, South Korea, Japan, Malaysia, Taiwan, Vietnam, China, Philippines and Indonesia, but that working with India's civil servants was a "slow and painful" process.

=== Land and property ===
Officials are alleged to be stealing state property. In cities and villages throughout India, groups of municipal and other government officials, elected politicians, judicial officers, real estate developers, and law enforcement officials, acquire, develop and sell land in illegal ways. Such officials and politicians are very well protected by the immense power and influence they possess. Apart from this, slum-dwellers who are allotted houses under several housing schemes such as Pradhan Mantri Gramin Awaas Yojana, Rajiv Awas Yojna, Pradhan Mantri Awas Yojna, etc., rent out these houses to others, to earn money due to severe unemployment and lack of a steady source of income.

=== Tendering processes and awarding contracts ===
A 2006 report claimed that state-funded construction activities in Uttar Pradesh, such as road building, were dominated by construction mafias, consisting of cabals of corrupt public works officials, materials suppliers, politicians and construction contractors.

Problems caused by corruption in government-funded projects are not limited to the state of Uttar Pradesh. The World Bank study finds that public distribution programs and social spending contracts have proven to be a waste due to corruption.

For example, the government implemented the Mahatma Gandhi National Rural Employment Guarantee Act (MGNREGA) on 25 August 2005. The Central government outlay for this welfare scheme is ₹400 crore (US$43 million) in FY 2010–2011. After 5 years of implementation, in 2011, the programme was widely criticised as no more effective than other poverty reduction programmes in India. Despite its best intentions, MGNREGA faces the challenges of corrupt officials reportedly pocketing money on behalf of fake rural employees, poor quality of the program infrastructure, and unintended destructive effect on poverty.

=== Science and technology ===
CSIR, the Council of Scientific and Industrial Research, has been flagged in ongoing efforts to root out corruption in India. Established with the directive to do translational research and create real technologies, CSIR has been accused of transforming into a ritualistic, overly-bureaucratic organisation that does little more than churn out papers.

There are many issues facing Indian scientists, with some calling for transparency, a meritocratic system, and an overhaul of the bureaucratic agencies that oversee science and technology. Sumit Bhaduri stated, "The challenges of turning Indian science into part of an innovation process are many. Many competent Indian scientists aspire to be ineffectual administrators (due to administrative power and political patronage), rather than do the kind of science that makes a difference". Prime minister Manmohan Singh spoke at the 99th Indian Science Congress and commented on the state of the sciences in India, after an advisory council informed him there were problems with "the overall environment for innovation and creative work" and a "war-like" approach was needed.

=== Preferential award of mineral resources ===
In August 2011, an iron ore mining scandal became a media focus in India. In September 2011, an elected member of Karnataka's legislative assembly, Janardhana Reddy, was arrested on charges of corruption and illegal mining of iron ore in his home state. It was alleged that his company received a preferential allotment of resources, organised and exported billions of dollars' worth of iron ore to Chinese companies in recent years without paying any royalty to the state government exchequer of Karnataka or the central government of India, and that these Chinese companies made payments to shell companies registered in Caribbean and north Atlantic tax havens controlled by Reddy.

It was also alleged that corrupt government officials in charge of regulating mining, port facilities and shipping cooperated with Reddy. These officials received monthly bribes in exchange for enabling the illegal export of mined iron ore to China. Such scandals have led to a demand in India for a consensually driven action plan to eradicate the piracy of India's mineral resources by an illegal, politically corrupt government officials-business nexus, removal of incentives for illegal mining, and the creation of incentives for legal mining and domestic use of iron ore and steel manufacturing.

=== Driver licensing ===
A study conducted between 2004 and 2005 found that India's driver licensing procedure was a bureaucratic process and allows drivers to be licensed despite their low driving ability through promoting the usage of agents. Individuals with the willingness to pay make a significant payment above the official fee and most of these extra payments are made to agents, who act as an intermediary between bureaucrats and applicants.

The average licensee paid Rs 1,080, approximately 2.5 times the official fee of Rs 450, in order to obtain a licence. On average, those who hired agents had a lower driving ability, with agents helping unqualified drivers obtain licences and bypass the legally required driving examination. Among the surveyed individuals, approximately 60% of the licence holders did not even take the licensing exam and 54% of those licence holders failed an independent driving test.

Agents are the channels of corruption in this bureaucratic driver licensing system, facilitating access to licences among those who are unqualified to drive. Some of the failures of this licensing system are caused by corrupt bureaucrats who collaborate with agents by creating additional barriers within the system against those who did not hire agents.

=== Delays ===
Administrative delays are common in India, often with discretionary powers with bureaucrats to grant or deny approvals, as the official processes are time-consuming, people seeking government services pay a bribe to hasten the process to avoid the opportunity cost of time-spent in getting official work done.

=== Trends ===
Professor Bibek Debroy and Laveesh Bhandari claim in their book Corruption in India: The DNA and RNA that public officials in India may be cornering as much as ₹921 billion (US$9.8 billion), or 1.26 per cent of the GDP, through corruption. The book claims most bribery is in government-delivered services and the transport and real estate industries.

Bribery and corruption are pervasive, but some areas tend to have more issues than others. A 2013 EY (Ernst & Young) Study reports the industries perceived to be the most vulnerable to corruption as: Infrastructure and Real Estate, Metals and Mining, Aerospace and Defence, and Power and Utilities. There is a range of specific factors that make a sector more susceptible to bribery and corruption risks than others. High use of middlemen, large value contracts, liaisoning activities, etc. drive the depth, volume, and frequency of corrupt practices in vulnerable sectors.

A 2011 KPMG study reports India's real estate, telecommunications, and government-run social development projects as the three top sectors plagued by corruption. The study found India's defence, information technology, and energy sectors to be the most competitive and least corruption-prone sectors.

CMS India claims in its 2010 India Corruption Study report that socio-economically weaker sections of Indian society are the most adversely affected by government corruption. These include the rural and urban poor, although the study claims that nationwide perception of corruption decreased between 2005 and 2010. Over the 5-year period, a significantly greater number of people surveyed from the middle and poorest classes in all parts of India claimed government corruption had dropped over time, and that they had fewer direct experiences with bribery demands.

The table below compares the perceived anti-corruption efforts across some of the major states in India. A rising index implies higher anti-corruption efforts and falling corruption. According to this table, the states of Bihar and Gujarat have experienced significant improvements in their anti-corruption efforts, while conditions have worsened in the states of Assam and West Bengal. Consistent with the results in this table, in 2012 a BBC News report claimed the state of Bihar has transformed in recent years to become the least corrupt state in India.

Index trends in major states by respective anti-corruption effort
State	1990–95	1996–00	2001–05	2006–10
Bihar	0.41	0.30	0.43	0.88
Gujarat	0.48	0.57	0.64	0.69
Andhra Pradesh	0.53	0.73	0.55	0.61
Punjab	0.32	0.46	0.46	0.60
Jammu & Kashmir	0.13	0.32	0.17	0.40
Haryana	0.33	0.60	0.31	0.37
Himachal Pradesh	0.26	0.14	0.23	0.35
Tamil Nadu	0.19	0.20	0.24	0.29
Madhya Pradesh	0.23	0.22	0.31	0.29
Karnataka	0.24	0.19	0.20	0.29
Rajasthan	0.27	0.23	0.26	0.27
Kerala	0.16	0.20	0.22	0.27
Maharashtra	0.45	0.29	0.27	0.26
Uttar Pradesh	0.11	0.11	0.16	0.21
Odisha	0.22	0.16	0.15	0.19
Assam	0.21	0.02	0.14	0.17
West Bengal	0.11	0.08	0.03	0.01

== Black money ==
Black money refers to money that is not fully or legitimately the property of the 'owner' such as money that is not reported to the government in the attempt of tax evasion, or other forms of black money including money from illegal activities such as drug dealing. A government white paper on black money in India suggests two possible sources of black money in India; the first includes activities not permitted by the law, such as crime, drug trade, terrorism, and corruption, all of which are illegal in India and secondly, wealth that may have been generated through lawful activity but accumulated by failure to declare income and pay taxes. Some of this black money ends up in illicit financial flows across international borders, such as deposits in tax haven countries.

A November 2010 report from the Washington-based Global Financial Integrity estimates that over a 60-year period, India lost US$213 billion in illicit financial flows beginning in 1948; adjusted for inflation, this is estimated to be $462 billion in 2010, or about $8 billion per year ($7 per capita per year). The report also estimated the size of India's underground economy at approximately US$640 billion at the end of 2008 or roughly 50% of the nation's GDP.

India was ranked 38th by money held by its citizens in Swiss banks in 2004 but then improved its ranking by slipping to 61st position in 2015 and further improved its position by slipping to 75th position in 2016. According to a 2010 The Hindu article, unofficial estimates indicate that Indians had over US$1,456 billion in black money stored in Swiss banks (approximately US$1.4 trillion). While some news reports claimed that data provided by the Swiss Banking Association Report (2006) showed India has more black money than the rest of the world combined, a more recent report quoted the SBA's Head of International Communications as saying that no such official Swiss Banking Association statistics exist.

Another report said that Indian-owned Swiss bank account assets are worth 13 times the country's national debt. These allegations have been denied by the Swiss Bankers Association. James Nason of the Swiss Bankers Association in an interview about alleged black money from India, holds that "The (black money) figures were rapidly picked up in the Indian media and in Indian opposition circles, and circulated as gospel truth. However, this story was a complete fabrication. The Swiss Bankers Association never published such a report. Anyone claiming to have such figures (for India) should be forced to identify their source and explain the methodology used to produce them."

In a separate study, Dev Kar of Global Financial Integrity concludes, "Media reports circulating in India that Indian nationals held around US$1.4 trillion in illicit external assets are widely off the mark compared to the estimates found by his study." Kar claims the amounts are significantly smaller, only about 1.5% of India's GDP on average per annum basis, between 1948 and 2008. This includes corruption, bribery and kickbacks, criminal activities, trade mispricing, and efforts to shelter wealth by Indians from India's tax authorities.

According to a third report, published in May 2012, the Swiss National Bank estimates that the total amount of deposits in all Swiss banks, at the end of 2010, by citizens of India was CHF 1.95 billion (₹92.95 billion (US$990 million)). The Swiss Ministry of External Affairs has confirmed these figures upon request for information by the Indian Ministry of External Affairs. This amount is about 700-fold less than the alleged $1.4 trillion in some media reports. The report also provided a comparison of the deposits held by Indians and by citizens of other nations in Swiss banks. Total deposits held by citizens of India constitute only 0.13 per cent of the total bank deposits of citizens of all countries. Further, the share of Indians in the total bank deposits of citizens of all countries in Swiss banks has reduced from 0.29 per cent in 2006 to 0.13 per cent in 2010.

== Stock market manipulation ==
The Indian stock exchanges, the Bombay Stock Exchange and the National Stock Exchange, have been rocked by several high-profile market manipulation scandals. At times, the Securities and Exchange Board of India (SEBI) has barred various individuals and entities from trading on the exchanges for stock manipulation, especially in illiquid small-cap and penny stocks.

== Judiciary ==
According to Transparency International, judicial corruption in India is attributable to factors such as "delays in the disposal of cases, shortage of judges and complex procedures, all of which are exacerbated by a preponderance of new laws". Over the years there have been numerous allegations against judges, and in 2011 Soumitra Sen, a former judge at the Calcutta High Court became the first judge in India to be impeached by the Rajya Sabha, (Upper House of the Indian Parliament) for misappropriation of funds.

== Police ==
Corruption in police or law enforcement is a major issue across India. While bribery is rampant, police corruption has also been linked to favors, false reports, threats to public for personal gains, freebies, extortion to run businesses, enforcement of arbitrary and draconian laws, fabricating evidence to protect the rich and political elite, as well as internal payoffs for preferred postings and promotions. Unlike western nations, where police are accountable to the public, the Police Act of 1861, a colonial era police law that is still in use across several states, mandates the accountability of law enforcement to the political leadership in power, which is often misused to quell protests or suppress evidences if linked to political figures. The law also compels personnel, mostly subordinates, to work for long hours at a stretch with no sufficient rest, which affects investigations, conduct towards public, and there have been instances where such officials have engaged in victim blaming, especially in crimes against women. In addition, many instances of police officers refusing to file reports and investigate have taken place, or delayed actions, which have led to citizen vigilantism, mostly in sensitive cases like crimes against women.

One reason for police corruption is the poor pay and benefits, along with no overtime and hazard pay for dangerous police work or operations, as well as a lack of fixed working hours or career progression. The 7th Pay Commission mandated a pay of Rs. 21,700 per month for constables, while the top ranked Director-General of Police having a pay of Rs. 225,000 per month. The pay for constables and inspector-ranked officers varies from state to state. Across metro areas, the lowest of the subordinates i.e. the constabulary does not get decent housing or any allowances for reasonable accommodation. In addition, while service rules mandate promotion based on merit and time in service, it is not duly followed, due to which officials have resorted to pay bribes for promotions and choice of postings.

Following the 2006 Supreme Court orders, all states were directed to implement police reforms to combat corruption, improve working conditions, ensure modernization, and form Police Complaints Authority to investigate misconduct by law enforcement personnel. However, most states have had zero or partial compliance to the orders, as many of the Governments feared a loss of political control over their police forces. Furthermore, the Police Complaints Authority have been criticized for being lame-duck institutions that lack real power to take down errant police personnel accused of misconduct, as well as delaying justice by covering up their actions.

== Anti-corruption initiatives ==
=== Right to Information Act ===
The 2005 Right to Information Act required government officials to provide the information requested by citizens or face punitive action, as well as the computerisation of services and the establishment of vigilance commissions. This has considerably reduced corruption and opened up avenues to redress grievances.

=== Right to Public Services laws ===
Right to Public Services legislation, which has been enacted in 19 states of India, guarantees time-bound delivery of services for various public services rendered by the government to citizens and provides mechanisms for punishing the errant public servant who is deficient in providing the service stipulated under the statute. Right to Service legislation is meant to reduce corruption among government officials and to increase transparency and public accountability.

=== Anti-corruption laws in India ===
Public servants in India can be imprisoned for several years and penalised for corruption under the:

- Prevention of Corruption Act, 1988
- Bharatiya Nyaya Sanhita, 2023
- Prosecution section of Income Tax Act, 1961
- The Benami Transactions (Prohibition) Act, 1988 to prohibit benami transactions.
- Prevention of Money Laundering Act, 2002

Punishment for bribery in India can range from six months to seven years of imprisonment.

India is also a signatory to the United Nations Convention against Corruption since 2005 (ratified 2011). The Convention covers a wide range of acts of corruption and also proposes certain preventive policies. The Lokpal and Lokayuktas Act, 2013 which came into force from 16 January 2014, seeks to provide for the establishment of the institution of Lokpal (a national anti-corruption ombudsman) and Lokayuktas (equivalent state-level ombudsmen) to inquire into allegations of corruption against certain public functionaries in India. Whistle Blowers Protection Act, 2011 provides a mechanism to investigate alleged corruption and misuse of power by public servants and also protect anyone who exposes alleged wrongdoing in government bodies, projects and offices. It was amended in 2014. As of 2025, the law had not yet been implemented.

At present there are no legal provisions to check graft in the private sector in India. Government has proposed amendments in existing acts and certain new bills for checking corruption in private sector. Big-ticket corruption is mainly witnessed in the operations of large commercial or corporate entities. In order to prevent bribery on supply side, it is proposed that key managerial personnel of companies' and also the company shall be held liable for offering bribes to gain undue benefits.

The Prevention of Money Laundering Act, 2002 provides that the properties of corrupt public servants shall be confiscated. However, the Government is considering incorporating provisions for confiscation or forfeiture of the property of corrupt public servants into the Prevention of Corruption Act, 1988 to make it more self-contained and comprehensive.

A committee headed by the Chairman of Central Board of Direct Taxes (CBDT), has been constituted to examine ways to strengthen laws to curb generation of black money in India, its illegal transfer abroad, and its recovery. "The Committee shall examine the existing legal and administrative framework to deal with the menace of generation of black money through illegal means including inter-alia the following: 1. Declaring wealth generated illegally as national asset; 2. Enacting/amending laws to confiscate and recover such assets; and 3. Providing for exemplary punishment against its perpetrators." (Source: 2013 EY report on Bribery & Corruption)

The Companies Act, 2013, contains certain provisions to regulate frauds by corporations including increased penalties for frauds, giving more powers to the Serious Fraud Investigation Office, mandatory responsibility of auditors to reveal frauds, and increased responsibilities of independent directors. The Companies Act, 2013 also provides for mandatory vigil mechanisms which allow directors and employees to report concerns and whistleblower protection mechanism for every listed company and any other companies which accepts deposits from public or has taken loans more than 50 crore rupees from banks and financial institutions. This intended to avoid accounting scandals such as the Satyam scandal which have plagued India. It replaces the Companies Act, 1956 which was proven outmoded in terms of handling 21st century problems.

In 2015, Parliament passed the Black Money (Undisclosed Foreign Income and Assets) and Imposition of Tax Bill, 2015 to curb and impose penalties on black money hoarded abroad. The Act has received the assent of the President of India on 26 May 2015. It came into effect from 1 July 2015.

=== Vigilance Commissions and Vigilance Wing ===
- Central Vigilance Commission (CVC): The top anti-corruption body at the national level. It handles complaints against senior officials of the central government and advises the government on disciplinary matters. It is independent and reports to the President of India.
- State Vigilance Commissions: Some states have their own vigilance commissions to handle corruption at the state level. Their structure and powers vary by state.
- Internal Vigilance Wings: Each government ministry, department, or agency at the central and state levels has an internal vigilance wing to prevent and address corruption. These units gather intelligence on corrupt practices and report to the government. They are headed by Chief Vigilance Officers (CVOs).

=== Anti-corruption bureaus and courts ===
At the central level, India has several agencies responsible for preventing and investigating corruption. The Central Vigilance Commission (CVC) functions as the apex vigilance body, supervising vigilance administration in central government ministries and institutions and overseeing corruption cases handled by the Central Bureau of Investigation (CBI).

The Central Bureau of Investigation, CBI is the principal anti-corruption law enforcement agency of the Government of India. The CBI is the primary investigative agency for corruption involving central government officials and central public sector undertakings. The Enforcement Directorate (ED) deals with corruption-linked financial crimes, particularly under the Prevention of Money Laundering Act (PMLA). The Lokpal of India acts as the statutory anti-corruption ombudsman for complaints against senior public officials, while the Comptroller and Auditor General of India (CAG) plays a preventive role by detecting financial irregularities through audits of government expenditure. The Directorate General of Income Tax (Investigation) (DGITI) investigates income tax evasion–related offences and functions under the Ministry of Finance, Government of India.

At the state level, there are state anti-corruption agencies and Lokayukta investigation branches. State Vigilance and Anti-Corruption Bureaus function under their respective state governments, while the Lokayukta is an independent institution. Certain states such as Andhra Pradesh (Anti-Corruption Bureau, Andhra Pradesh) Kerala (Vigilance & Anti-corruption Bureau, Kerala) and Karnataka (Lokayukta) also have their own anti-corruption agencies and special courts.

The Supreme Court of India ruled that state police and vigilance anti-corruption bureaus can investigate corruption cases against Central government employees under the Prevention of Corruption Act and file charge sheets without CBI approval, affirming their concurrent jurisdiction despite the CBI's usual role. The Lokayukta is the ombudsman institution at the state level that deals with corruption. Its powers and jurisdiction vary from state to state. The Lokayukta has an investigation branch (police wing) that investigates offences. In some states, such as Karnataka, the state anti-corruption agency was abolished and its investigative powers were transferred to the Lokayukta.

List of Anti-Corruption Agencies
State/UT	Anti-Corruption Agency
Andhra Pradesh	Andhra Pradesh Anti-Corruption Bureau
Arunachal Pradesh	Arunachal Pradesh Lokayukta
Assam	Directorate of Vigilance & Anti-Corruption, Assam
Bihar	Vigilance Department, Bihar
Chhattisgarh	Anti-Corruption Bureau, Chhattisgarh
Goa	Goa Police Anti-Corruption Branch
Gujarat	Gujarat Anti-Corruption Bureau
Haryana	Haryana State Vigilance Bureau
Himachal Pradesh	Himachal Pradesh State Vigilance & Anti-Corruption Bureau
Jharkhand	Anti-Corruption Bureau, Jharkhand
Karnataka	Lokayukta, Karnataka
Kerala	Vigilance & Anti-Corruption Bureau, Kerala (VACB)
Madhya Pradesh	Lokayukta Special Police Establishment, Madhya Pradesh
Maharashtra	Maharashtra Anti-Corruption Bureau
Manipur	Vigilance & Anti-Corruption Department, Manipur
Meghalaya	Meghalaya Police Anti-Corruption Branch
Mizoram	Anti-Corruption Bureau, Mizoram
Nagaland	Directorate of Vigilance & Anti-Corruption Police, Nagaland
Odisha	Odisha Vigilance Directorate
Punjab	Punjab State Vigilance Bureau
Rajasthan	Anti-Corruption Bureau, Rajasthan
Sikkim	Vigilance Police Department, Sikkim
Tamil Nadu	Directorate of Vigilance & Anti-Corruption, Tamil Nadu
Telangana	Telangana Anti-Corruption Bureau
Tripura	Tripura Anti-Corruption Bureau
Uttar Pradesh	Anti-Corruption Organisation, Uttar Pradesh
Uttarakhand	Vigilance Establishment of Uttarakhand
West Bengal	Directorate of Anti-Corruption Branch, West Bengal
Delhi	Delhi Police Vigilance Department

Andhra Pradesh's Anti Corruption Bureau (ACB) has launched a large scale investigation in the "cash-for-bail" scam. CBI court judge Talluri Pattabhirama Rao was arrested on 19 June 2012 for taking a bribe to grant bail to former Karnataka Minister Gali Janardhan Reddy. A case has also been opened against seven other individuals under the Indian Penal Code and the Prevention of Corruption Act.

=== Civic anti-corruption organisations ===
A variety of organisations have been created in India to actively fight against corrupt government and business practices. Notable organisations include:

- Bharat Swabhiman Trust, established by Ramdev, has campaigned against black money and corruption for a decade.
- 5th Pillar is most known for the creation of the zero-rupee note, a valueless note designed to be given to corrupt officials when they request bribes.
- India Against Corruption was a popular movement active during 2011–12 that received much media attention. Among its prominent public faces were Arvind Kejriwal, Kiran Bedi and Anna Hazare. Kejriwal went on to form the Aam Aadmi Party and Hazare established Jan Tantra Morcha.
- Jaago Re! One Billion Votes was an organisation founded by Tata Tea and Janaagraha to increase youth voter registration. They have since expanded their work to include other social issues, including corruption.
- The Lok Satta Movement, has transformed itself from a civil organisation to a full-fledged political party, the Lok Satta Party. The party has fielded candidates in Andhra Pradesh, Tamil Nadu, and Bangalore. In 2009, it obtained its first elected post, when Jayaprakash Narayan won the election for the Kukatpally Assembly Constituency in Andhra Pradesh.
- Right to Recall Party founded by Rahul Chimanbhai Mehta is among parties contesting elections on the agenda of decreasing corruption through their right to recall drafts.

=== Electoral reforms ===
A number of ideas have been in discussion to improve the efficiency and effectiveness of electoral processes in India.

== Factors contributing to corruption in India ==
In a 2004 report on Corruption in India, one of the world's largest audit and compliance firms KPMG notes several issues that encourage corruption in India. The report suggests high taxes and excessive regulation bureaucracy as a major cause; India has high marginal tax rates and numerous regulatory bodies with the power to stop any citizen or business from going about their daily affairs.

This power of Indian authorities to search and question individuals creates opportunities for corrupt public officials to extract bribes—each individual or business decides if the effort required for due process and the cost of delay is worth paying the bribe demanded. In cases of high taxes, paying off the corrupt official is cheaper than the tax. This, according to the report, is one major cause of corruption in India and 150 other countries across the world. In the real estate industry, the high capital gains tax in India encourages large-scale corruption. The KPMG report claims that the correlation between high real estate taxes and corruption is high in India, as it is in other countries, including the developed economies; this correlation has been true in modern times as well as throughout centuries of human history in various cultures.

The desire to pay lower taxes than those demanded by the state explains the demand side of corruption. The net result is that the corrupt officials collect bribes, the government fails to collect taxes for its own budget and corruption grows. The report suggests regulatory reforms, process simplification and lower taxes as means to increase tax receipts and reduce causes of corruption.

In addition to tax rates and regulatory burdens, the KPMG report claims corruption results from opaque process and paperwork on the part of the government. Lack of transparency allows room for manoeuvre for both demanders and suppliers of corruption. Whenever objective standards and transparent processes are missing, and subjective opinion driven regulators and opaque/hidden processes are present, conditions are ripe for corruption.

Vito Tanzi in an International Monetary Fund study suggests that in India, like other countries in the world, corruption is caused by excessive regulations and authorisation requirements, complicated taxes and licensing systems, mandated spending programmes, lack of competitive free markets, monopolisation of certain goods and service providers by government controlled institutions, bureaucracy, lack of penalties for corrupt public officials and lack of transparent laws and processes. A Harvard University study finds these to be some of the causes of corruption and underground economy in India.

== Impact of corruption ==
=== Loss of credibility ===
In a study on bribery and corruption in India conducted in 2013 by global professional services firm Ernst & Young (EY), a majority of the survey respondents from PE firms said that a company operating in a sector which is perceived as highly corrupt may lose ground when it comes to fair valuation of its business, as investors bargain hard and factor in the cost of corruption at the time of transaction.

According to a report by KPMG, "high-level corruption and scams are now threatening to derail the country's credibility and [its] economic boom".

=== Economic losses ===
Corruption may lead to further bureaucratic delay and inefficiency if corrupt bureaucrats introduce red tape in order to extort more bribes. Such inadequacies in institutional efficiency could affect growth indirectly by lowering the private marginal product of capital and investment rate. Levine and Renelt showed that investment rate is a robust determinant of economic growth. Bureaucratic inefficiency also affects growth directly through misallocation of investments in the economy. Additionally, corruption results in lower economic growth for a given level of income.

=== Quality of education ===
Corruption in Indian education system has been eroding the quality of education and has been creating long-term negative consequences for the society. Educational corruption in India is considered one of the major contributors to domestic black money. In 2021, Manav Bharti University, a private university, was accused of selling tens of thousands of degrees for money over a decade.

== History ==
=== Only 15 paise reaches the beneficiary ===
In the 1985 Rajiv Gandhi, then the Prime Minister of India, had said that for every rupee, targeted towards drought-affected Kalahandi district in Odisha, only a fraction, 15 paise, reached the intended beneficiary. This observation by the Prime Minister has been called a guess, an estimate, not based on empirical data. While the statement has been connected to corruption, it has also been taken as an understanding of the large operating costs and overheads of administering public services. India's Chief Vigilance Commissioner later added that of the remaining, "40 paise perhaps can be accounted for administrative overheads and 45 paise is pure corruption".

It has also been felt and politically stated that even less than 15 paise is a truer estimate in some cases; 10 paise, even less than 5 paise. In 2007, in the same context, deputy chairman of the Planning Commission Montek Singh Ahluwalia said that the amount that reaches the poor has reached 50%. In 2009, Prime Minister Manmohan Singh agreed that there were still leakages, however not to the tune of what Rajiv Gandhi had felt. An empirical estimate based on a later study under economist Kirit Parikh came up with the figure of 16 paise. This figure varies between state and program. A 2005 study stated "one rupee of budgetary consumer subsidy is worth only 27 paise to the poor" with a finding that about 58% of food grains do not reach the intended target.

== See also ==
- Political funding in India
- Right to Information Act, 2005
- Crime in India
- Economic history of India
- List of scandals in India
- Licence Raj
- Mafia Raj
- Uprising 2011, Indians Against Corruption
- Debt bondage in India

Anti-corruption:

- 2012 Indian anti-corruption movement
- 2011 Indian anti-corruption movement
- Jan Lokpal Bill
- Right to Public Services legislation
- Lok Ayukta

General:

- Corruption Perceptions Index
- Rent seeking
- Socio-economic issues in India
- International Anti-Corruption Academy
- Group of States Against Corruption
- International Anti-Corruption Day
- ISO 37001 Anti-bribery management systems
- United Nations Convention against Corruption
- OECD Anti-Bribery Convention
- Transparency International
