= Nonpartisanship =

Lack of affiliation with (and bias towards) a political party

Nonpartisanship, also known as nonpartisanism, is a lack of affiliation with a political party and a lack of political bias. The absence of political bias can be measured in comparison to the median voter.

While an Oxford English Dictionary definition of partisan includes adherents of a party, cause, person, etc., in most cases, nonpartisan refers specifically to political party connections rather than being the strict antonym of "partisan".

== Canada ==
In Canada, the Legislative Assembly of the Northwest Territories and the Legislative Assembly of Nunavut are the only bodies at the provincial/territorial level that are currently nonpartisan; they operate on a consensus government system. The autonomous Nunatsiavut Assembly operates similarly on a sub-provincial level.

== India ==
In India, the Jaago Re! One Billion Votes campaign was a non-partisan campaign initiated by Tata Tea, and Janaagraha to encourage citizens to vote in the 2009 Indian general election. The campaign was a non-partisan campaign initiated by Anal Saha.

== Kazakhstan ==
In Kazakhstan, nonpartisanship applies to the highest offices of government. The president and the Senate are legally nonpartisan, and the president is barred from holding party membership while in office. Akims (regional, city, and district heads) and their deputies are also prohibited from holding formal positions in party structures. While national or local election candidates may still receive backing from public associations or political parties, their affiliation nor endorsement does not formally appear on the forms of ballot papers.

== Philippines ==
Barangay elections, elections to the lowest political subdivision, the barangay (transl. village), is mandated by law to be nonpartisan and be inexpensive. However, candidates have recently began to be members of political parties, undermining the nonpartisan nature of the election.

== United States ==
Historian Sean Wilentz argues that from the days of George Washington's farewell address, to pre-president Senator Barack Obama's speech at the Democratic national convention in 2004, politicians have called upon Americans to move beyond parties. Wilentz calls this the post-partisan style, and argues that "the antiparty current is by definition antidemocratic, as political parties have been the only reliable electoral vehicles for advancing the ideas and interests of ordinary voters". However, nonpartisan elections are quite common at the local level, primarily in an effort to keep national issues from being mixed up with local issues.

Today, nonpartisan elections are generally held for municipal and county offices, especially school board, and are also common in the election of judges. The unicameral Legislature of Nebraska is the only state legislature that is entirely officially nonpartisan; additionally, the bicameral Fono of American Samoa is the only territorial legislature that is officially nonpartisan.

Although elections may be officially nonpartisan, in some elections (usually involving larger cities or counties, as well as the Nebraska unicameral) the party affiliations of candidates are generally known, most commonly by the groups endorsing a particular candidate (e.g., a candidate endorsed by a labor union would be generally affiliated with the Democratic Party, while a candidate endorsed by a business coalition would be generally affiliated with the Republican Party).

=== Churches and other 501(c)(3) organizations ===
Churches and charities in the United States are mainly formed under US Internal Revenue Service tax code 501(c)(3) non-profit organization regulations. To maintain that tax-exempt status, and the ability for donors to take a tax deduction, they are required to remain nonpartisan.

This has caused some to question the ability of organizations that have the appearance of partisanship.

The Brookings Institution is a Washington, D.C. think tank and 501(c)(3) non-profit, nonpartisan organization. Since its founding in 1916, it has had both identifiable Republicans and Democrats among its leadership. Owing to leadership changes such as this, some argue that it is a good example of a nonpartisan organization. The New York Times has at times listed the organization as being liberal, liberal-centrist, centrist, and conservative. In 2008, The New York Times published an article where it referred to the "conservative Brookings Institution".

=== Nonpartisan League ===
In the Progressive Era, the Nonpartisan League was an influential socialist political movement, especially in the Upper Midwest, particularly during the 1910s and 1920s. It also contributed much to the ideology of the former Progressive Party of Canada. It went into decline and merged with the Democratic Party of North Dakota to form the North Dakota Democratic–NPL Party in 1956.

=== Milwaukee ===
In the history of Milwaukee, the "Nonpartisans" were an unofficial but widely recognized coalition of Republicans and Democrats who cooperated in an effort to keep Milwaukee's Sewer Socialists out of as many offices as possible, including in elections which were officially non-partisan, but in which Socialists and "Nonpartisans" were clearly identified in the press. (Such candidates were sometimes called "fusion" candidates.) This lasted from the 1910s well into the 1940s. (The similar effort in 1888 to prevent Herman Kroeger's election as a Union Labor candidate had been conducted under the banner of a temporary "Citizen's Party" label.) During the period of Socialist-Progressive cooperation (1935–1941), the two sides were called "Progressives" and "Nonpartisans".

== See also ==
- Apoliticism
- Decline to state
- Freedom of information
- Journalistic objectivity
- Independent politician
- Independent voter
- Media reform
- Neutrality
- Non-partisan democracy
- Objectivity (science)
- Partisan (politics)
- Party switching
- Subjectivity and objectivity (philosophy)
