= Indian Council of World Affairs =

Think tank in New Delhi, India

- Formation: 1943
- Type: Public Policy, Think Tank
- Headquarters: Sapru House, Barakhamba Road, New Delhi
- Location: New Delhi, India
- Board of directors: C.P.Radhakrishnan, President of the Council, Vice President of India; S. Jaishankar, Vice President of the Council, Minister of External Affairs, Government of India; Shashi Tharoor, Vice-President of the Council
- Key people: T. C. A. Raghavan (Director General)
- Staff: 68
- Website: icwa.in

The Indian Council of World Affairs (ICWA) is a New Delhi based Indian think-tank. Established in 1943, it was India's first independent international affairs think tank. It was founded in 1943 when several members of the Indian Institute of International Affairs (IIIA) decided to form a separate institute. The ICWA affiliated itself with the Indian National Congress, whereas the IIIA supported the British Indian government.

By an Act of Parliament, it has been declared an institution of national importance in 2001. The Vice President of India is the ex-officio President of ICWA, while the Minister of External Affairs is its Vice-President. It is housed in Sapru House, the name being derived from Sir Tej Bahadur Sapru, who was also the founder President of the Council. ICWA is a member of the United Nations Academic Impact.

ICWA has been called by media as one of India's influential think-tanks, but is seen only as an extension of the Ministry of External Affairs.

== See also ==
- Foreign relations of India
- Institute for Defence Studies and Analyses
- Observer Research Foundation
- Foreign Service Institute, India
- List of think tanks in India
