= Usha Martin =

Indian wire rope manufacturer

Usha Martin Limited
- Company type: Public company
- Traded as: BSE: 517146, NSE: USHAMART
- ISIN: INE228A01035
- Industry: Steel; Wire rope; Construction; Oil and gas; Energy
- Founded: 1961; 65 years ago
- Headquarters: Kolkata, India
- Area served: Worldwide
- Key people: Vijay Singh Bapna (Chairman); Rajeev Jhawar (Managing director); Anirban Sanyal (CFO)
- Revenue: ▲₹32.96 billion (US$340 million) (2023)
- Net income: ▲₹3.5 billion (US$37 million) (2023)
- Total assets: ▲₹27.42 billion (US$290 million) (2022)
- Total equity: ▲₹16.97 billion (US$180 million) (2022)
- Website: Official website

Usha Martin Limited is an Indian multinational company that primarily operates in the steel and wire rope manufacturing industry. It was founded in 1961 by Basant Kumar Jhawar and is headquartered in Kolkata, West Bengal, India. Usha Martin is one of the largest wire rope manufacturers globally.

== Overview ==
Usha Martin has manufacturing facilities in many locations in India and internationally. It operates in the United States, the United Kingdom, Dubai, Thailand, and Singapore. It has a wide range of projects and collaborations across different industries. Some of them include wire rope manufacturing for use in sectors such as oil and gas, mining, elevators, cranes, bridges, and general engineering, and for Infrastructure and construction projects like bridges, flyovers and metro rail systems. It also provides wire ropes and steel products for offshore oil and gas exploration projects like drilling rigs, offshore platforms, and subsea operations. Some other industries that it caters to are mining industry, elevators/lifts and wind energy. It also has interests in other sectors such as real estate, agriculture, and information technology.

== Corporate management ==
Vijay Singh Bapna is the chairman while Rajeev Jhawar is the Managing director. The Company Secretary is Manish Agarwal and the Chief Financial Officer is Abhijit Paul

== Subsidiaries ==
Usha Martin has subsidiaries like Usha Martin Education & Solutions Limited, Usha Martin Technologies Limited, Usha Martin Infrastructure Limited, Usha Martin International Limited and Usha Beltron Limited.

== Financials ==
Usha Martin reported a total income of Rs. 32958.2 million during the financial year ended 31 March 2023, compared with Rs.27233.1 million during the financial year ended 31 March 2022. The company had a net profit of Rs.3501.4 million for the financial year ended 31 March 2023 as against net profit of Rs.2912.7 million for the financial year ended 31 March 2022.
