= COVID-19 and Its Challenges =

2020 edited volume by Vijay Kumar Ahluwalia and Amrita Jash

COVID-19 and Its Challenges: Is India Future Ready?
- Editors: Vijay Kumar Ahluwalia; Amrita Jash
- Language: English
- Subject: Geopolitics
- Genre: Nonfiction
- Published: 2020
- Publisher: Pentagon Press
- Publication place: India
- Media type: Hardcover
- Pages: 159
- ISBN: 978-93-90095-02-5
- OCLC: 1221017458

COVID-19 and Its Challenges: Is India Future Ready? is an edited volume by Lt. General Vijay Kumar Ahluwalia and Amrita Jash of the Centre for Land Warfare Studies.

== Background ==
The book comprises eleven contributors across nine chapters, providing critical insight into India's strategic challenges in 2020 and the recognition of human security as a national security domain. This book's central focus is assessing the threats, obstacles, and opportunities that collectively play a formative role in India's national security strategy in the world order that has emerged in the wake of the epidemic.

== Reception ==
As Chris Cubbage of Asia Pacific Security Magazine suggests, "the book clearly outlines ‘What India Needs to Do,’ which may be easier to document than to actually achieve."

Writing for Mission Victory India, Brigadier Vivek Verma describes the book, "[the book] goes straight-away with the task of highlighting the problems and provides recommendations that are intended to enrich the policy planners’ options."
