= Research Foundation for Governance in India =

Indian think tank

The Research Foundation for Governance in India
- Founded: 26 January 2009
- Founder: Kanan Dhru
- Type: Research, Awareness, Consulting
- Purpose: Good Governance, Legal System, Civil Society
- Location: 3, Brahmin Mitra Mandal Society, Mangaldas Road, Ellisbridge, Ahmedabad – 380006, India
- Region served: India
- Method: Research, Awareness, Consulting
- Members: 3000+
- Key people: Kanan Dhru (Founder & managing director); Kelly Dhru (Director); Swar Shah (Director)
- Volunteers: 18
- Website: Research Foundation for Governance in India

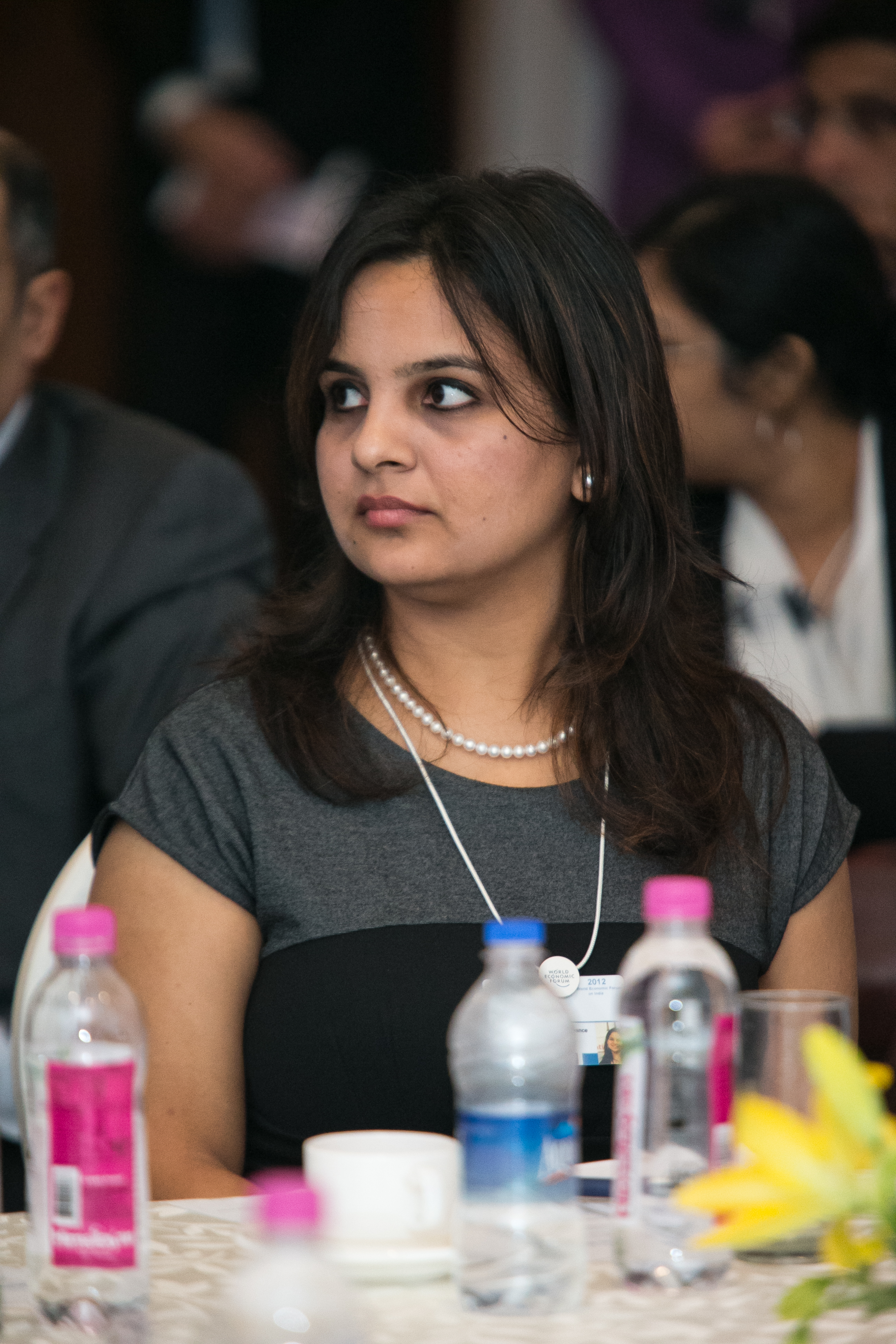
Kanan Dhru, Founder & managing director of Research Foundation for Governance in India, at the World Economic Forum on India 2012

The Research Foundation for Governance in India (RFGI) is a think tank based in Ahmedabad, India, with the aim to research, promote, and enact legal and political changes in Gujarat and across India. RFGI acts as a consultant to help implement government reforms. The Foundation researches issues for legal reform in law and governance. It also sponsors public events to raise awareness, especially among youth.

RFGI’s definition of governance is based upon the one given by the European Commission:

"rules, processes and behaviour that affect the way in which powers are exercised…. particularly as regards openness, participation, accountability, effectiveness and coherence"

The Foundation is a non-partisan and independent organization which does not support any ideology, specific candidate, or party.

== Introduction ==
Started in January 2009, the Research Foundation for Governance in India (RFGI) is an Ahmedabad-based think tank. RFGI is a think tank in the area of law and governance, with the idea of having citizenry, and especially youth, be more aware and participative to the legal processes in the country.

The objective of the Foundation is to help create strong processes of governance and an awareness of citizenry, primarily through seeking reforms in the legal and political arena by involving youth from different spheres.

RFGI aims to pursue this objective through spreading awareness of laws pertaining to governance, as well as by conducting research on key legal issues which affects governance of the country.

RFGI has a growing member-base of 600 members. This total includes eminent academicians, industrialists, lawyers, media professionals, policy-makers, politicians and students. The organisation has the potential to grow in the future, given the needs of political and legal reforms in the country.

== Focus areas and activities ==
The activities of RFGI are mainly structured around three focus areas, titled: Awareness, Research, and Consultation.

Awareness initiatives

One of the primary objectives of the foundation is to spread awareness on issues pertaining to governance and law amongst the citizens of India. The Foundation seeks to make people think about politics in a more positive way through making presentations and interactive sessions in schools and colleges, organising discussions and debates, and by getting more and more people interested in the process of governance.

The following are some of the awareness initiatives carried out by RFGI:

- Partnered with Jaago Re! One Billion Votes to promote voter registration for the 2009 Lok Sabha elections.
- Conducted a six-week project on local governance with Ahmedabad Municipal Corporation and Indicorps.
- Conducting presentations on citizenship and democracy at local schools and colleges in Ahmedabad.

Research activities

The research activities at the Foundation include examining and undertaking research on issues concerning politics, law, governance, infrastructure, functioning of public institution, welfare related issues, including those pertaining to elections as part of the function. The Foundation, through its research activities recommends and advocates systems of good governance at different levels of the society. Some of RFGI's publications are the following:

- “Acquisition of Land for 'Development' projects in India: The need for serious reconsideration of existing law" – Kelly Dhru, 2008
- "Whether the graduates of the National Law Schools cater to the need of Bar/Bench?" – Rohit Moonka
- "Freedom within the Law – The Search for Adivasi Autonomy" – Curtis Riep, 2009

RFGI impact

As part of the first phase of this project, RFGI had organised a panel discussion on the issue, on 5 July 2009, at GLS Auditorium, Gujarat. The event was graced by the Chief Justice of Gujarat, Justice Radhakrishnan as well as Dr. Madhava Menon, Founder Director, National Law School Bangalore and National Judicial Academy, Bhopal.

The seminar was able to generate debate and discussion on issues pertaining to legal reforms. Two of the recommendations which stemmed from the seminar are already in the stage of implementation:

- RFGI has been invited by the Gujarat Bar Association as Advisors on their 'Education & Training' Committee and work has already begun on structuring courses for training of the young lawyers in Gujarat.
- Shri Veerappa Moily, Union Law Minister, recently announced scholarships for young lawyers.

Consultation

The Foundation gets directly involved with Government projects and initiatives through its consultancy work. This involves working closely with different Government departments and organisations. One recent consultancy project was that on Library Development in the city of Ahmedabad for the Ahmedabad Municipal Corporation. RFGI's recommendations are now being implemented by the relevant Government authority.

== Notable members and associates ==
Kanan Dhru is the founder of RFGI. She is a practicing lawyer with degrees from the Gujarat National Law University (GNLU), Gandhinagar and the London School of Economics, United Kingdom. Prior to coming to India, she had briefly worked with the World Health Organization in Geneva. In India, she has worked with the National Knowledge Commission, a Prime Minister's Advisory Body, New Delhi. She has been an External Consultant with McKinsey & Company, a Visiting Scholar at Stanford University and been associated with the Government of Gujarat on several initiatives.

Kelly Dhru is the director of RFGI. Dhru is a law graduate from the Gujarat National Law University (GNLU), Gandhinagar and BCL (Distinction) from the Oxford University, United Kingdom. Dhru has done internships at a variety of legal institutions and courts, including the Legal and Treatise Division of Ministry of External Affairs, Government of India and Amarchand Mangaldas. She has researched for various projects of the World Bank and presented papers, including at Harvard University.

The following individuals are associated with RFGI:

- Professor (Dr.) Madhava Menon, Founder Director, National Law School and National Judicial Academy
- Professor Dilip Mavalankar, Indian Institute of Public Health Gandhinagar
- Dr. Kireet Joshi, Education Advisor to the Chief Minister of Gujarat
- Shri Girish Patel, post graduate from Harvard Law School, Senior Counsel at the High Court of Gujarat and a social activist.

RFGI has collaborated on various projects and activities with the following organisations and institutions:

- Jaago Re! One Billion Votes
- OS Open Space
- Accountability Initiative
- ADR Association for Democratic Reforms
- Indicorps
- The Indian Institute of Management Ahmedabad (IIM)
- Janaagraha

== Media coverage ==
- Indian Express: RFGI & JaaGo Re! One Billion Votes awakens 8,000 voters in Ahmedabad (18 April 2009)
- Indian Express: Seminar on youth participation in electoral politics (27 April 2009)
- Ahmedabad Mirror: Amdavadi youth talk on why they shun politics (27 April 2009)
- Times of India: Well-known personalities debate youth participation in politics (27 April 2009)
- DNA: Speak Up (28 April 2009)
- Indian Express: Disillusioned voter (3 May 2009)
- Hindustan Times: Why I didn't want to Vote (3 May 2009)
- Indian Express: Most junior lawyers in HC unhappy over working conditions (20 May 2009)
- Indian Express: Bar Council to consider junior lawyers' issues (2 June 2009)
- Times of India: Some appointments in judiciary political: CJ (8 July 2009)
- DNA: Appoint law officers on merit, says chief justice (8 July 2009)
- Ahmedabad Mirror: Gujarat needs more law schools (8 July 2009)
- Ahmedabad Mirror: Foreigner helps NGO create benchmark for politics (4 August 2009)
- Divyabhaskar: Rajkaran ma ras le yuvano (24 November 2009)
- Interview with Kanan Dhru of RFGI
- DNA: 'More youths in politics will ensure better governance' (7 December 2009)
- Indian Express: No three-year law college in Ahmedabad has requisite faculty strength: survey (9 December 2009)
- Times of India: Experts to discuss Indian legal system (12 December 2009)
- Times of India: 'India’s legal system needs to be updated' (14 December 2009)
- Ahmedabad Mirror: India’s legal system worst:HC lawyer (15 December 2009)
- Indian Express: Three-year law colleges could be a thing of the past (13 January 2010)
- Indian Express: People divided over compulsory voting (13 January 2010)
- DNA: Opinion divided over Compulsory Voting Bill (14 January 2010)

== Projects ==
1) Project on Understanding and Removing Entry Barriers to the Profession of Litigation

Research Foundation for Governance in India aims at motivating youth into the processes of governance. These include the fields of politics, administration, and judiciary. Unfortunately, the common perception of the profession of litigation and of judges is that of an inefficient, corrupt system full of delays and malpractices. The aim in this study is to ensure that the profession of litigation is welcoming to young law students. At the same time, it is desirable that the students from five-year as well as three-year colleges are adequately trained to best contribute to the profession and are ultimately working towards an efficient justice-delivery mechanism which will help society.

As part of the Phase-2 of the project, work has begun to increase the survey respondents to 1000. In parallel, work to develop a white paper containing concrete recommendations on reconsidering entry level requirements and working conditions for young law graduates in litigation is being undertaken. The white paper would also profile case-studies of some of the individuals who have established themselves as arguing lawyers despite adversity.

After the completion of the white-paper, the recommendations will be taken through a volley of round-table discussions with prominent people and opinion makers and finally culminate with publication of the same. RFGI thereafter aims to create awareness and lobby for the implementation of the recommendations to the relevant government departments as well as other stakeholders.

RFGI hopes that by implementing recommendations that help attract bright young people to the profession of litigation, many of the issues facing the Indian legal system will improve.

2) Project on Analysing Inner-party Democracy in Political Parties in India

This study aims at providing a link between a common Indian citizen and the main political parties. The basic objective is to raise awareness amongst citizens on how political parties function in terms of the democratic processes followed for its administrative and functional aspects. The research would also look at the way parties outline a career growth for a party member in terms of opportunity and accessibility, while looking at the broader question of the attractiveness of 'politics' as a career.

The message would be encapsulated in the premise of moving towards a more democratic and reformist model of political party functioning wherein party members get a bigger say in the functioning and decision making stages, making the party machinery reflect a complete inclusive system of all those involved. In the future, the aim is to create an evolved system with citizens having more faith in political parties, primarily derived from RFGI's proposed new model of meritocracy and fairness in all aspects, be it office bearers, ticket distribution etc.

A White Paper would be published on this research idea, taking it through a volley of round table discussions with prominent people and opinion makers and finally culminate with a grand seminar to raise awareness on this issue. RFGI thereafter aims to create new benchmarks and present the recommendations to relevant stakeholders as well as to people of the nation.

3) Study on "Preventive Law: lessons to be learnt from preventive medicine" under the guidance from Professor Dileep Mavalankar, Indian Institute of Management, Ahmedabad and Columbia School of Public Policy

Significant research and developments have been made in the field of preventive andsocial medicines, which have alleviated human suffering to a great extent. By spreading awareness about health and hygiene, vaccinations, spraying of medicines and other such measures, certain diseases have been reduced, and have been 'nipped in the bud'.

Like medicine, the role of the legal system of a country is also to alleviate human suffering. So far, the Indian legal system has concentrated on 'Remedial Measures', rather than adopt a preventive approach. The existing courts in India are flooded with cases. The number of pending cases in the courts of Gujarat is 2,300,000. At the same time, the citizens are less aware about their legal rights, and fear the system.

The objective of this paper is to draw a parallel between two disciplines which have similar objectives. The hypothesis is to test whether similar paths can be followed and lessons be learnt by the Indian legal system from the Preventive and Social Medicine.

The paper focuses on the Human Resource issues pertaining to Law and Medicine, particularly, on the entry requirements, professional qualifications, ethics and the population to provider ratios. The possibilities of customisation of legal assistance provided in different areas are explored. This paper also reviews certain legislations which can be better implemented and the disputes under which can be prevented by following certain key features of preventive medicine.

After the completion of the white-paper, the observations would be taken through round table discussions and disseminate the suggestions through publication and distribution of the paper. The suggestions would thereafter be presented to relevant government departments as well as other stakeholders and lobby for their implementation.

4) Study on "Efficiency and Accountability of Lok-Adalats in Gujarat” in partnership with Accountability Initiative, Centre for Policy Research, New Delhi

Lok Adalat is an alternative form of dispute settlement mechanism, introduced in India in the early 80s. The main idea behind having them was to improve access to justice at local levels, and ease the burden on the regular courts due to millions of petty cases that clog up their scare resources, awaiting settlement. Lok Adalats provide a speedy, arguably fair and deliberative form of dispute settlement, drawing on traditional methods of conciliation where the presiding judge – who is an experienced adjudicator with legal acumen and a record of public service – brings about an understanding between the claimants, and settles the cases as compromise between the two sides.

Due to a variety of reasons – ranging from misinformation and lack of awareness among people as to what the Lok Adalat was for, lack of knowledge and capacity on the part of the Lok Adalat benches to deal with the cases properly, and even intimidation of complainants against approaching Lok Adalats with their grievances, Lok Adalats often have limited results. Arguably, many of these problems in implementation could be addressed with some attention to detail, and a commitment to results on the part of the authorities. In theory Lok Adalats still remain a possible option to serve as a platform for solving cases at the pre-litigation stage.

Given this context, the research project aims to explore the efficacy and efficiency of Lok Adalats and test their accountability to the common Indian citizen.

5) Awareness seminars on Law & Governance in schools & colleges

One of the primary objectives of the foundation is to spread awareness on issues pertaining to governance and law amongst the citizens of India. The Foundation seeks to make people think about politics in a more positive way through making presentations in schools and colleges, organising discussions and debates, and by getting more and more people interested in the process of governance.
