= List of think tanks in India =

Policy think tanks in india

The following is a list of notable Indian think tanks

India has the second-largest number of think tanks in the world, with the country's total hitting 509 in 2018 behind 1871 in the United States of America and ahead of the People's Republic of China (507), the United Kingdom (321), and Argentina (227). Many of these are headquartered at its capital New Delhi and range from government aided organisations to privately funded ones.

Several Indian think tanks usually feature in the annual Global Go To Think Tank Index produced by the Lauder Institute of University of Pennsylvania. In 2018, the Observer Research Foundation was the highest ranked among the India-based think tanks.

| Name | Global Rank (2019) | Specialization | Funding Type | City (State) | Notes |
|---|---|---|---|---|---|
| Association for Democratic Reforms (ADR) | | Politics, Election, Governance | Not-for-profit | New Delhi | |
| Central Institute for Cotton Research (CICR) | | Agriculture | Government | Nagpur (Maharashtra); Sirsa (Haryana) | |
| Central Institute for Research on Buffaloes (CIRB) | | Agriculture, Animal Husbandry | Government | Hisar (Haryana) | |
| Central Sheep Breeding Farm (CSBF) | | Agriculture, Animal Husbandry | Government | Hisar (Haryana), India | |
| Centre for Air Power Studies (CAPS) | 29 - Top Defence and National Security Think Tank - Worldwide (2019) 78 - Top Think Tanks in China, India, Japan, and the Republic of Korea (2019) | Air Power, National Security, International Security | Not-for-profit | New Delhi | |
| Centre for Budget and Policy Studies (CBPS) | | Research on Education, Public Finance, Gender, Governance | Not-for-profit | Bengaluru | |
| Centre for Civil Society (CCS) | 83 | Politics | Not-for-profit | New Delhi | |
| Centre for Dialogue and Reconciliation (CDR) | | Peacebuilding | Not-for-profit | New Delhi | |
| Centre for Development Studies (CDS) | | Politics, Infrastructure, Social Science | Government | Thiruvananthapuram (Kerala) | |
| Centre for Social and Economic Progress (CSEP - formerly Brookings India Centre) | | Energy, Climate, Economics, Social Science, International Relations | Not-for-Profit | New Delhi | |
| Centre for Land Warfare Studies (CLAWS) | | Strategic Studies, Regional and National Security, International Relations | Not-for-profit | New Delhi | |
| Centre for Monitoring Indian Economy (CMIE) | | Economic Statistics and Database, Economic Policy | For-profit | Mumbai | |
| Centre for Policy Research (CPR) | | Politics, Policy, Governance | Not-for-profit | New Delhi | |
| Centre for Public Policy Research (CPPR) | | Politics, Policy, Governance | Not-for-profit | Kochi (Kerala) | |
| Centre for Science and Environment (CSE) | | Environment | Non-Governmental Organization | New Delhi | |
| Center for Study of Science, Technology and Policy (CSTEP) | | Policy, Science and Technology | Not-for-profit Company | Bengaluru (Karnataka) | |
| Chennai Centre for China Studies (C3S) | | China, International Relations, Strategy | Not-for-profit | Chennai (Tamil Nadu) | |
| Council On Energy, Environment and Water (CEEW) | | Energy, Environment, Water | Not-for-profit | New Delhi | |
| Edward & Cynthia Institute of Public Health (ECIPH) | | Global Health, Public Health | Not-for-profit | Mangalore, India | |
| Forum of Free Enterprise (FFE) | | Entrepreneurship, Business | Not-for-profit | Mumbai (Maharashtra) | |
| Foundation for Democratic Reforms (FDR) | | Politics, Policy, Governance | Not-for-profit | Hyderabad (Telangana) | |
| Indian Council of World Affairs (ICWA) | | International Relations, Diplomacy, Strategy | Not-for-profit | New Delhi | |
| Indian Institute of Corporate Affairs (IICA) | | Business | Not-for-profit | New Delhi | |
| Institute for Defence Studies and Analyses (IDSA) | 42 | Military, Security, Geopolitics | Not-for-profit | New Delhi | |
| Institute for Studies in Industrial Development (ISID) | | Business, Industries | Not-for-profit | New Delhi | |
| Institute of Economic Growth (IEG) | | Business, Economy | Not-for-profit | New Delhi | |
| Institute of Food Security (IFS) | | Food, Policy | Government | Gurgaon (Haryana) | |
| Institute of Public Health Bengaluru | | Public health, health policy and systems research | Non-governmental | Bengaluru (Karnataka) | |
| Institute for Social and Economic Change (ISEC) | | Economy, Social Science, Policy | Government | Bengaluru (Karnataka) | |
| International Centre for Free and Open Source Software (ICFOSS) | | Free Software | Government | Thiruvananthapuram (Kerala) | |
| International Growth Centre (IGC) | | Business, Economy | Not-for-profit | New Delhi | |
| Nabakrushna Choudhury Centre for Development Studies (NCDS) | | Economics, Sociology and Anthropology | Government | Bhubaneswar | |
| National Academy of Agricultural Sciences (NAAS) | | Agriculture | Government | New Delhi | |
| National Centre for Cold-chain Development (NCCD) | | Food, Agriculture | Not-for-profit | New Delhi | |
| National Council of Applied Economic Research (NCAER) | | Business, Economics | Not-for-profit | New Delhi | |
| National Institute of Advanced Studies (NIAS) | | Science, Social Science | Government | Bengaluru (Karnataka) | |
| National Institute of Public Finance and Policy (NIPFP) | | Business, Finance, Policy | Government | New Delhi | |
| National Maritime Foundation (NMF) | | Matters related to Maritime | Non-governmental | New Delhi | Indian Navy's Knowledge Partner |
| National Research Centre on Equines (NRCE) | | Agriculture, Animal Husbandry | Government | Hisar (Haryana) | |
| National Research Centre on Plant Biotechnology, Hisar (NRCPB) | | Agriculture, Animal Husbandry | Government | Hisar (Haryana) | At CCS HAU |
| Observer Research Foundation (ORF) | | Geopolitics, Geo-economics | Not-for-profit | New Delhi | |
| PRS Legislative Research (PRSLR) | | Politics, Constitution | Not-for-profit | New Delhi | |
| Public Affairs Centre (PAC) | | Development, Economics, Governance, Social Policy | Think tank | Bengaluru | Part of IDRC's Think Tank Initiative (TTI) Website: pacindia.org |
| Public Health Foundation of India (PHFI) | | Health, Science, Policy | Not-for-profit | New Delhi | |
| Research Foundation for Governance in India (RFGI) | | Politics, Policy, Governance | Not-for-profit | Ahmedabad (Gujarat) | |
| South Asia Analysis Group (SAAG) | | International relations, Strategy, Politics, Policy, Governance | Not-for-profit | New Delhi | |
| The Energy and Resources Institute (TERI) | | Sustainable Agriculture, Climate Change, Energy, Environment, Sustainable Habitat, Health & Nutrition, Resources and Sustainable Development | Not-for-profit | New Delhi | |
| Vivekananda International Foundation (VIF) | | Culture, Civilization, Politics, Policy | Not-for-profit | New Delhi | |
| World Resources Institute India (WRI India) | 3 - Top Environmental Policy think tank 2019 6 - Best transdisciplinary research think tank 2019 | Environment Policy, Climate Change, Urban Transport | Not-for-profit | Mumbai New Delhi Bangalore | |
| Wildlife Institute of India (WII) | | Ecology Policy | Government | Dehradun (Uttarakhand) | |
| Foundation for Economic Development | | Economic Policy | Not-for-profit | New Delhi | |
| Centre for Effective Governance of Indian States | | State capacity | Not-for-profit | New Delhi | |

== See also ==
- List of think tanks
