= Anti-Corruption Bureau (Andhra Pradesh) =

State government agency in India

Anti-Corruption Bureau, Andhra Pradesh
- అవినీతి నిరోధక శాఖ

State agency overview
- Formed: 2 January 1961
- Jurisdiction: High Court of Andhra Pradesh
- Headquarters: Vijayawada, India
- Motto: Fighting Corruption
- State agency executive: Dr J Purnachandra Rao, IPS
- Website: acb.ap.gov.in

Map
- Location of Andhra Pradesh (marked in red) in India

Anti-Corruption Bureau, Andhra Pradesh, abbreviated as ACB, is an agency specialized in fighting corruption in various departments of the government against public servants and private persons who abet the offences under the Prevention of Corruption Act, 1988. It is established on 2 January 1961. Senior I.P.S. Officer Shri Pendyala Sitharama Anjaneyulu is the current Director General of the bureau. As the Andhra Pradesh government on 8 November had withdrawn the 'general' consent that was given to the members of the Delhi Special Police Establishment (DSPE) to carry out search and operations in the state without informing the government, the bureau has to play a greater role in A.P.

== See also ==
- Corruption in India
- Government of Andhra Pradesh
