= Manohar Parrikar Institute for Defence Studies and Analyses =

Indian think tank based in New Delhi

Coordinates: 28.5712°N 77.1496°E

- Formation: 11 November 1965; 60 years ago
- Type: Public Policy Think Tank
- Headquarters: 1, Development Enclave, Rao Tularam Marg, New Delhi 110010
- Director General: Sujan R. Chinoy
- Staff: 70
- Website: IDSA.in

Manohar Parrikar Institute for Defence Studies and Analyses (MP-IDSA) is an Indian think tank for advanced research in international relations, especially defence, strategic and security issues. It also provides training to civilian, military and police officers of the Indian government. It is non-partisan and autonomous. It is funded by the India's Ministry of Defence.

It aims to promote national and international security by carrying out research on defence and security-related issues and disseminating the knowledge among the policy-makers and wider public.

The current director general is Ambassador Sujan R. Chinoy, who took over the reins of MP-IDSA on 3 January 2019 on a three-year assignment. MP-IDSA is the only think-tank in India whose director general is appointed by the Appointments Committee of the Cabinet, chaired by the prime minister of India.

MPIDSA has long been regarded as one of India's most influential think-tanks. The University of Pennsylvania's Global Go To Think Tank Index ranked IDSA 41st in the world in 2017. It received the top position among Indian think tanks.

== History ==
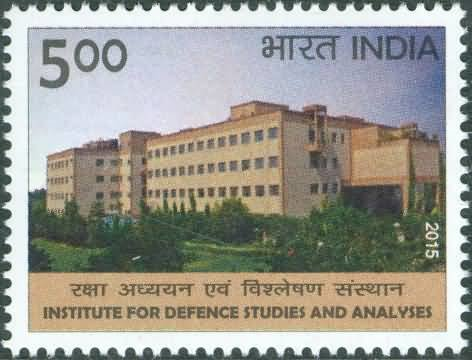
Institute for Defence Studies and Analyses postal stamp issued in 2015

IDSA was established on 11 November 1965 as a non-partisan and autonomous body. It is funded by the Indian Ministry of Defence and plays a key role in shaping India's foreign and security policies. In February 2020 IDSA was renamed as 'Manohar Parrikar Institute for Defence Studies and Analyses (MP-IDSA)' after former Defence Minister Manohar Parrikar.

== Governance ==
MP-IDSA is governed by an Executive Council, whose members are distinguished personalities from various walks of life and which is headed by a president. The council is supported by committees covering different aspects of the institute's work. Executive Council Committees cover subjects such as administration, academics, finance, membership, etc. Members of the council are elected for two-year terms at the Annual General Body meeting.

The president of the Executive Council is by convention, an ex-officio position, held by the incumbent defence minister. The current president is Rajnath Singh.

== Activities ==
=== Research ===
The institute's presently focused research areas are divided in following categories: South Asia, East Asia, Russia and Central Asia, West Asia and Africa, Europe and Americas, Military Affairs, Non-Traditional Security, Weapons of Mass Destruction, and Terrorism and International Security. The institute has a strong research faculty of more than fifty distinguished scholars drawn from academia, defence, foreign affairs, media and other civil services. The institute's state-of-the-art library, situated at the heart of the Indian capital New Delhi caters to the needs of policymakers.

=== Training ===
The institute provides training and refresher courses to senior government officers drawn from various branches of Indian Civil Service, i.e., the Indian Administrative Service, the Indian Foreign Service, the Indian Police Service, the Armed Forces and the Para-Military Forces.

=== International interactions ===
MP-IDSA has international interactions through various means. The institute holds international seminars and conferences, publishes journals, hosts to visiting scholars, and ties up with institutes from all over the world.

=== Government policy ===
The MP-IDSA plays a role in shaping the Indian government's foreign and security policies. For example; the Indian Parliament's Standing Committee on Defence frequently calls on the institute's experts. Officers of the armed forces come to spend up to two years at the institute to gain a policy perspective. The institute's annual report is tabled in the Indian Parliament.

The Defence Minister of India informed the Indian parliament in 2012 that the IDSA appoints both civilian and military personnel to publish books, journal articles and reviews.

== Publications ==
The institute's flagship journal Strategic Analysis is published bimonthly in collaboration with Taylor & Francis. It aims to promote an understanding of Indian strategic thinking on national and international themes.

Other periodical publications include:

- Journal of Defence Studies – a quarterly journal focusing on core issues of defence.
- Africa Trends – a quarterly magazine on providing information on significant and strategic developments taking place in Africa.
- CBW Magazine – a magazine focusing on arms control, disarmament, roles of state and non-state actors, regarding chemical and biological weapons.
- Various policy briefs, issue briefs, occasional papers and newsletters.

The members of the institute actively publish various books and monographs via regular publishing houses in India and overseas.

== Ranking ==
The Global Go To Think Tank Index, prepared annually by the University of Pennsylvania Foreign Policy Research Institute, ranked IDSA 55th in the world in 2013, 105th in 2016 and 41st in 2017. This was the top position received by any Indian think tank in 2017.

== Past heads ==
Name	From	To
D. Som Dutt	1 August 1966	31 July 1968
K. Subrahmanyam	10 October 1968	30 September 1975
P.R. Chari	1 October 1975	31 March 1980
K. Subrahmanyam	1 April 1980	31 July 1987
Air Commodore Jasjit Singh	1 August 1987	31 July 2001
K.Santhanam	1 August 2001	31 July 2004
Commodore C. Uday Bhaskar (Acting)	1 August 2004	8 September 2005
N.S. Sisodia	9 September 2005	15 November 2011
Arvind Gupta	January 2012	July 2014
Jayant Prasad	September 2015	September 2018

== See also ==
- Centre for Land Warfare Studies
- Centre for Air Power Studies (India)
- United Service Institution
- Indian Council of World Affairs
- Observer Research Foundation
- National Defence College (India)
- List of think tanks in India
