= Institute of Food Security =

Central Civil Service training academy in Haryana, India

- Other names: IFS
- Former names: Central Training Institute (CTI) FCI
- Type: Central Civil Service Training Institution
- Established: 1997
- Affiliations: Food Corporation of India
- Director: Moitreyi Mohanty
- Location: Gurgaon, Haryana, India; 28°28′59″N 77°04′21″E
- Campus: 87, Delhi Jaipur Expressway, Sector 18
- Website: www.fci.gov.in

The Institute of Food Security, (acronym IFS), is a central civil service training institute formed by the Food Corporation of India (FCI) under the Ministry of Consumer Affairs, Food and Public Distribution. The Institute acts as a hub of information, training and research activities related to food security in India. It is situated in the Food Corporation of India premises at Gurgaon, in Haryana state.

== Profile ==
The Institute of Food Security was born in 1971 under the name, the Central Training Institute (CTI), as the controlling training centre of FCI for training category-I and II officers whereas the four zonal training institutes under the CTI, trained category-III employees. In 1997, CTI moved to its own building. In 2004, the mandate of the institute was expanded, the zonal institutes were abandoned and the institute was renamed as the Institute of Food Security, placing it as the in-house training centre of FCI for the entire spectrum of its employees.

The institute is engaged in imparting training, based on short term and long term courses, to the employees of FCI, to develop their skills on matters related to food security, management, computers and general operations of FCI. The training modules are designed as induction, probationary and in-service programs. As such, the institute performs as the human resource development wing of FCI. Is also takes care of training personnel of other institutions like Central Water Commission (CWC), State Water Commissions (SWCs), National Agricultural Cooperative Marketing Federation of India (NAFED), The Haryana State Cooperative Supply and Marketing Federation Ltd (HAFED) and The Haryana State Federation of Consumers’ Cooperative Wholesale Stores Ltd.(CONFED) as per requests from them and also organises seminars on food security.

== Mandate ==
The institute is mandated to be responsible for the following:

- The Institute of Food Security as a centre of Human Resource Development of Food Corporation of India will provide a complete solution to the training needs for the Executives of the corporation.
- It will provide need based training to each executive up to the level of Dy. Manager at least once in every 3 years for enhancement of available knowledge and skill.
- The institute will strive for continuous improvement in its own function by making constant evaluation of its training standard parameters and taking timely corrective and preventive action.
- The institute will take up training / consultancy assignments on commercial basis for external clients with the target of increasing revenue generation by at least 15% each year and to be self-reliant in the long run future by out sourcing the infrastructure to other companies.

== Facilities ==
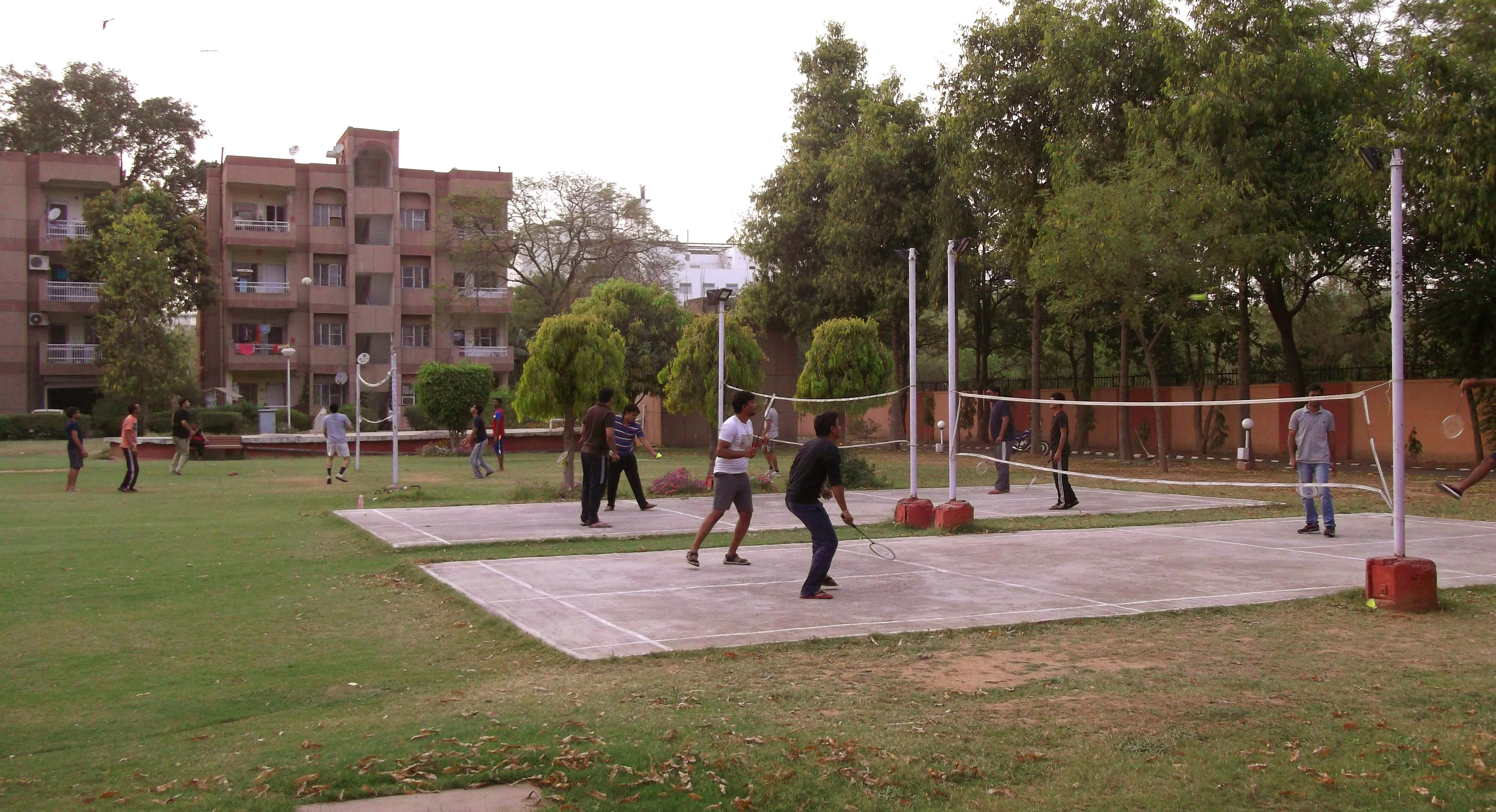
Playgrounds and Staff Quarters (in the background) at Institute of Food Security, Gurugram (Haryana)

Academic Area: The training activities of the institute is located at the Academic Area which houses two lecture halls and a modern conference hall. The halls are fitted with audio-visual systems, projectors and computer support.

Library: IFS Library is well stocked with over 5000 books as well as reports and publications of FCI and many other government departments. It also subscribes to 18 magazines and Journals.

Computer lab: The activity of the Computer Lab is twofold; imparting training on computers and related topics and maintenance and support of the information and communication requirements of the institute. IFS is networked on LAN and high speed internet connectivity is available to all users.

Quality Control lab: IFS maintains a quality control laboratory with modern equipment such as Ferinograph, Amylograph, IR-Protein Analyzer, Falling number apparatus and Alveograph which are used for high precision analysis of food grains. This laboratory is one of the most modern among FCI laboratories.

Hostel: IFS hostel is open to staff, trainees and guests and has boarding, lodging, hall, fitness and recreational facilities.

== Courses ==
IFS has placed long term courses for managerial cadre of FCI on topics such as:

- Operations and General Management
- Finance and Account Management
- Quality Control
- Hindi Rajbasha and RTI Act
- Computer Orientation
- Workshop on Engineering Works

IFS also has regular short term courses for inductees, trainees and probationers.

== Gallery ==
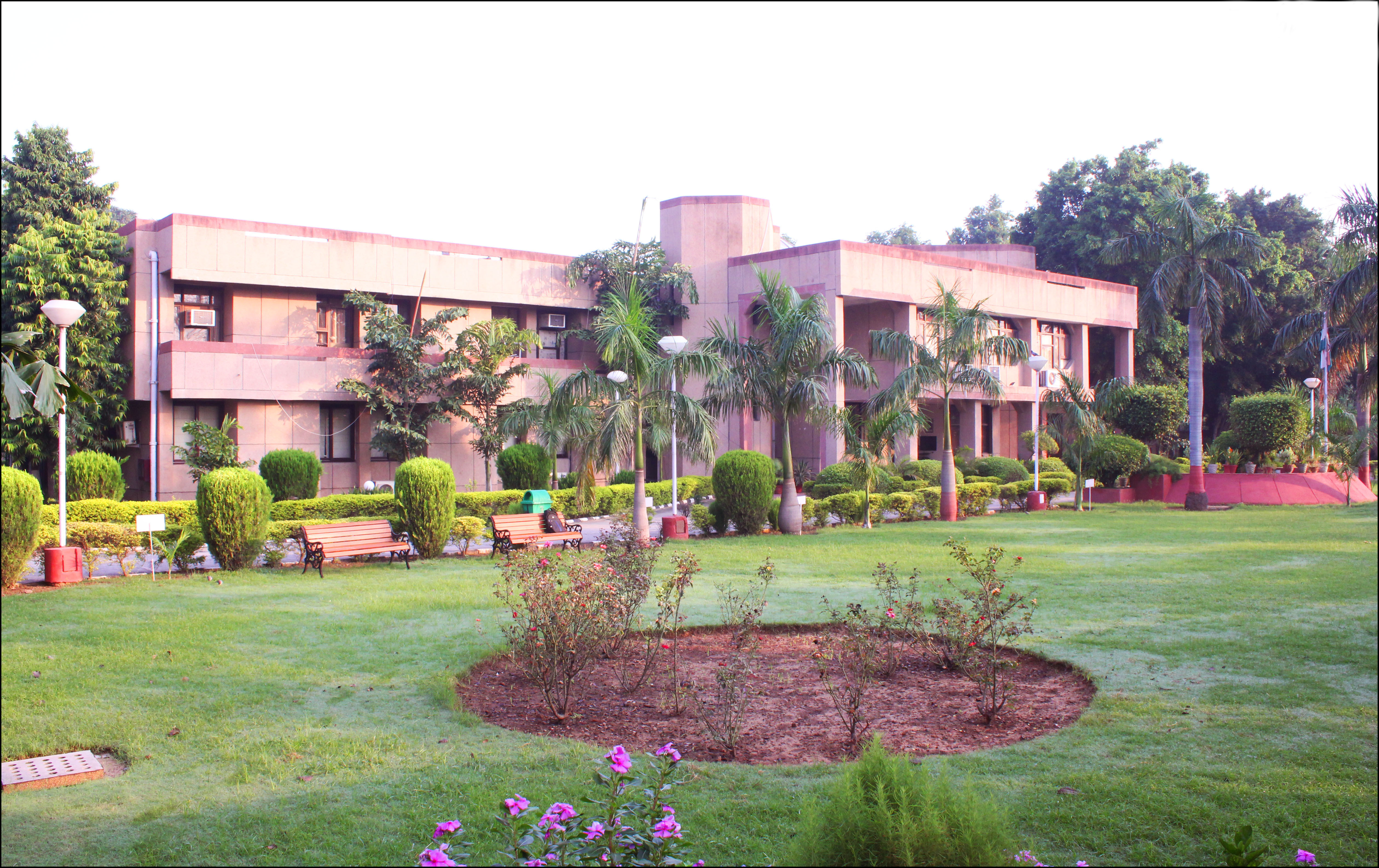
Institute of Food Security main building in Sector 18, Gurugram

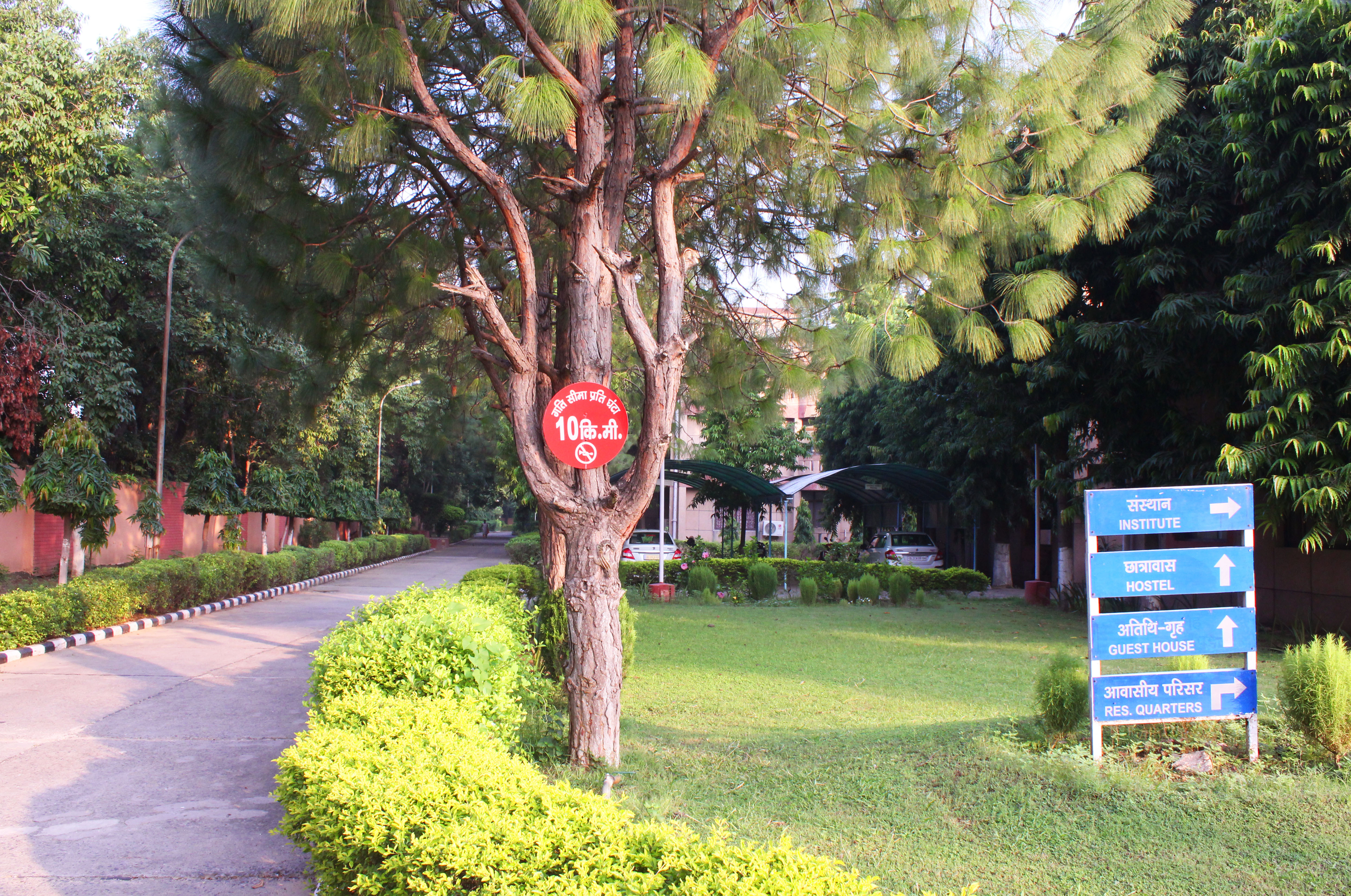
IFS premises on a bright autumn morning.

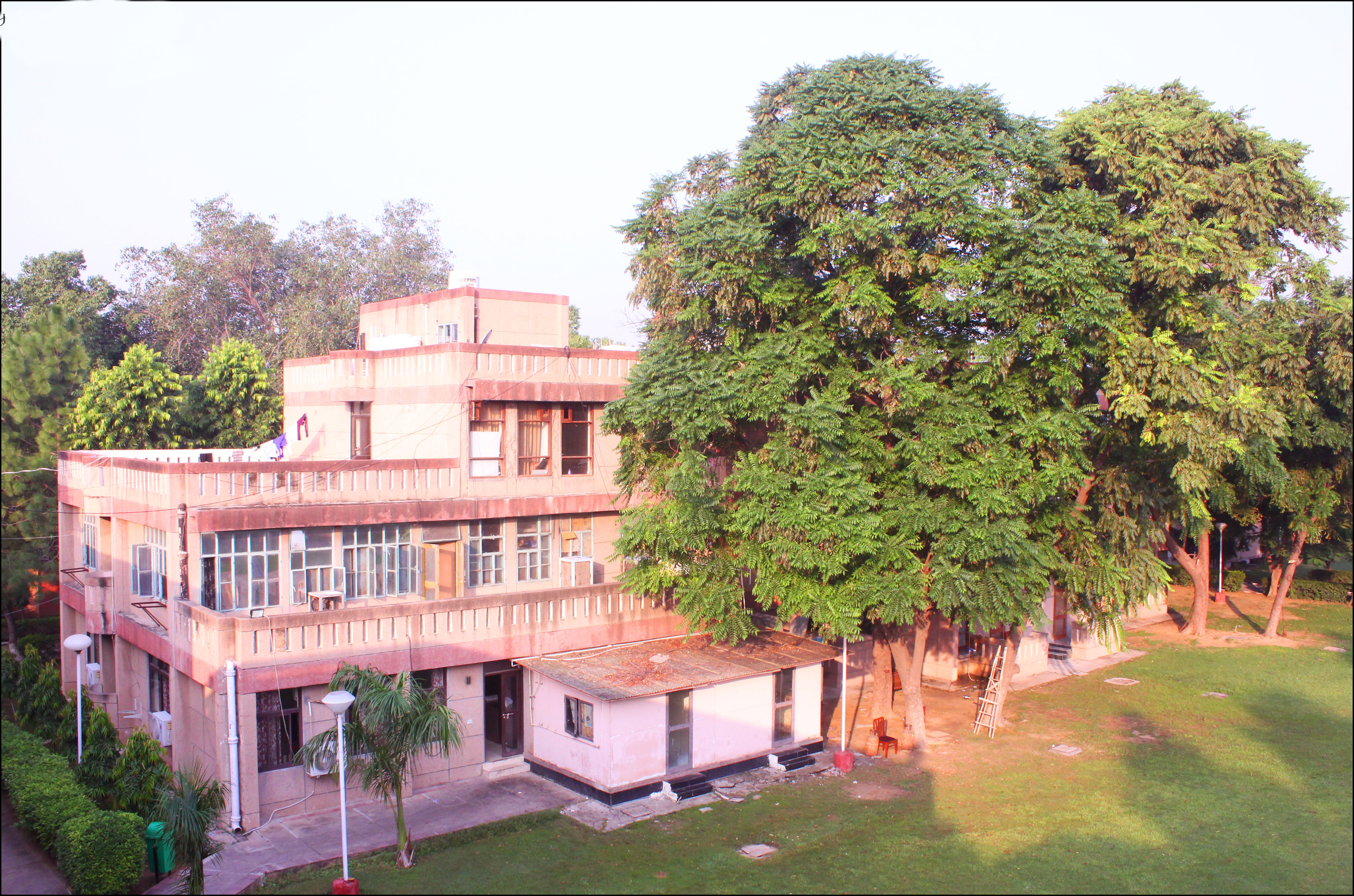
IFS infrastructure on a bright autumn morning.

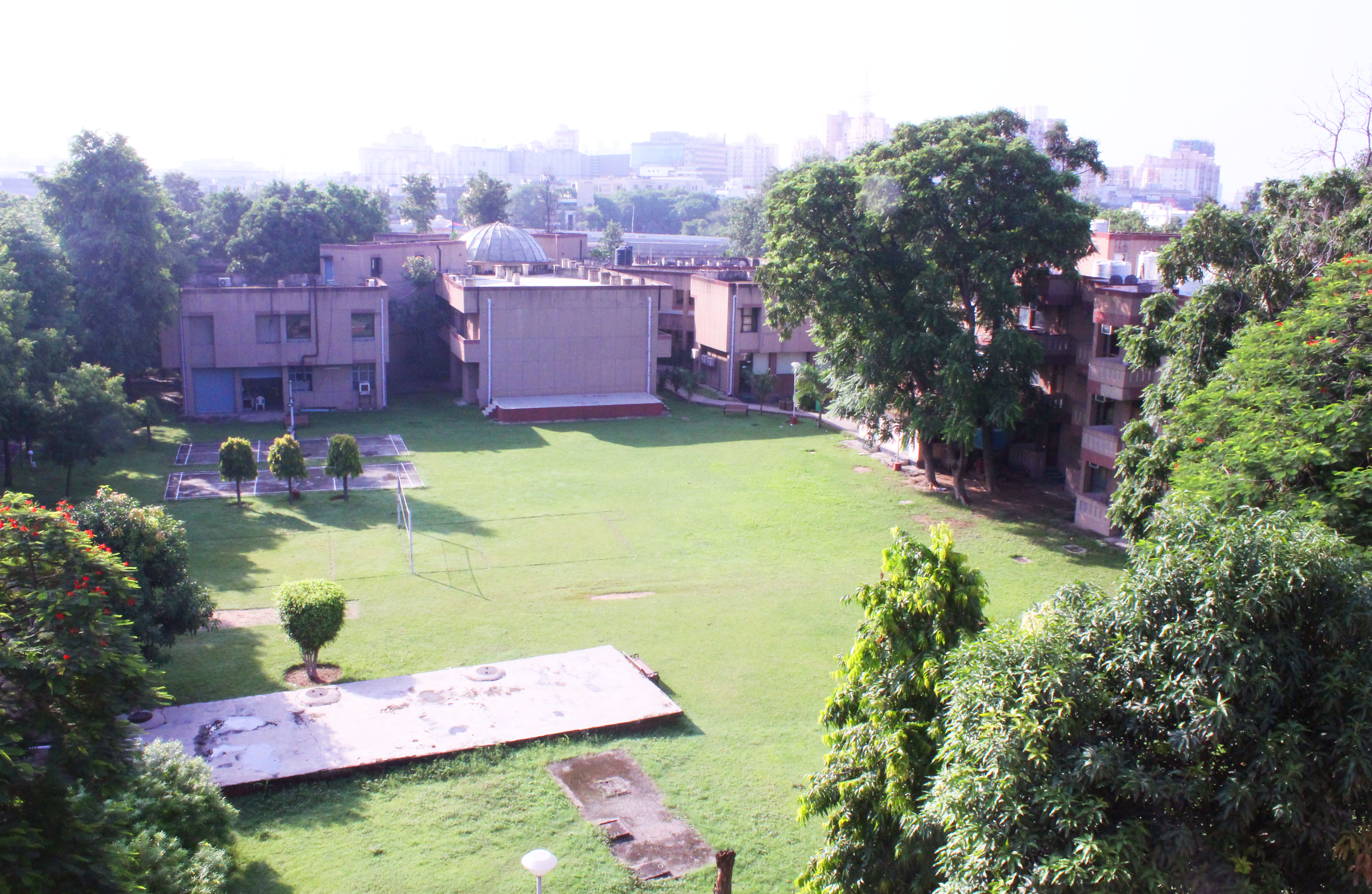
Well maintained sports cum recreational lawns inside IFS, Gurugram.

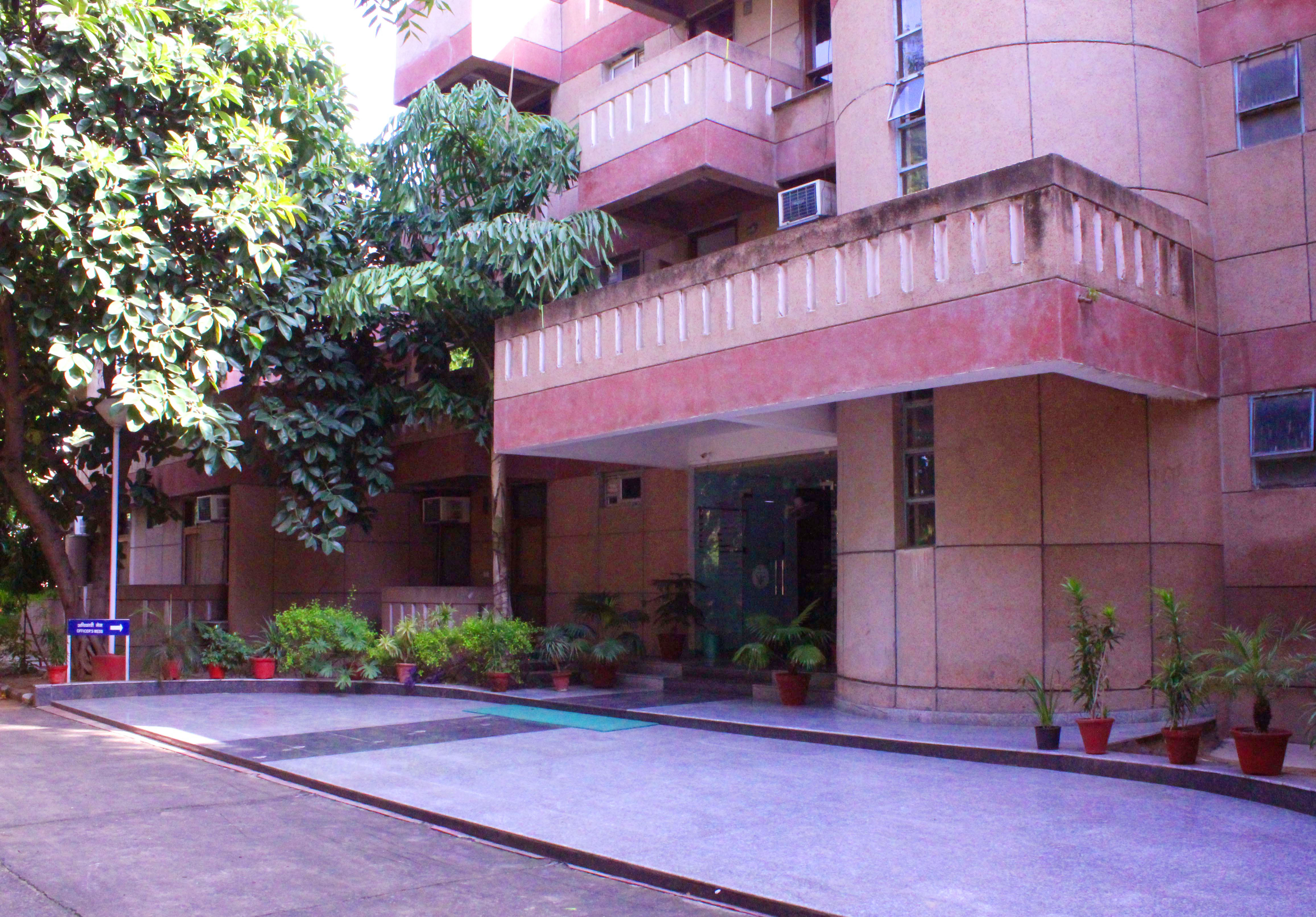
Fully Air Conditioned hostel in IFS, Gurugram

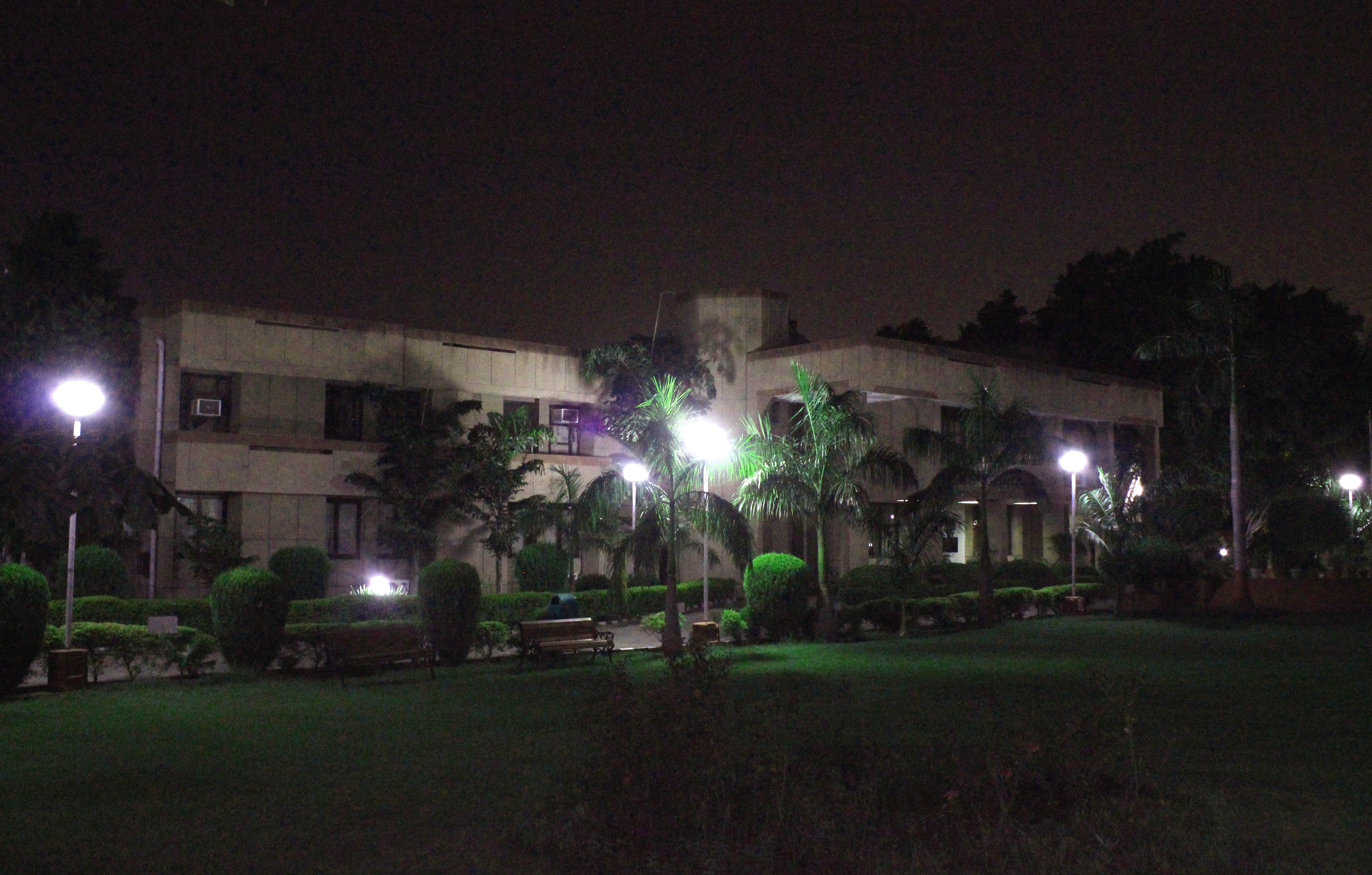
Institute of Food Security main building at night.

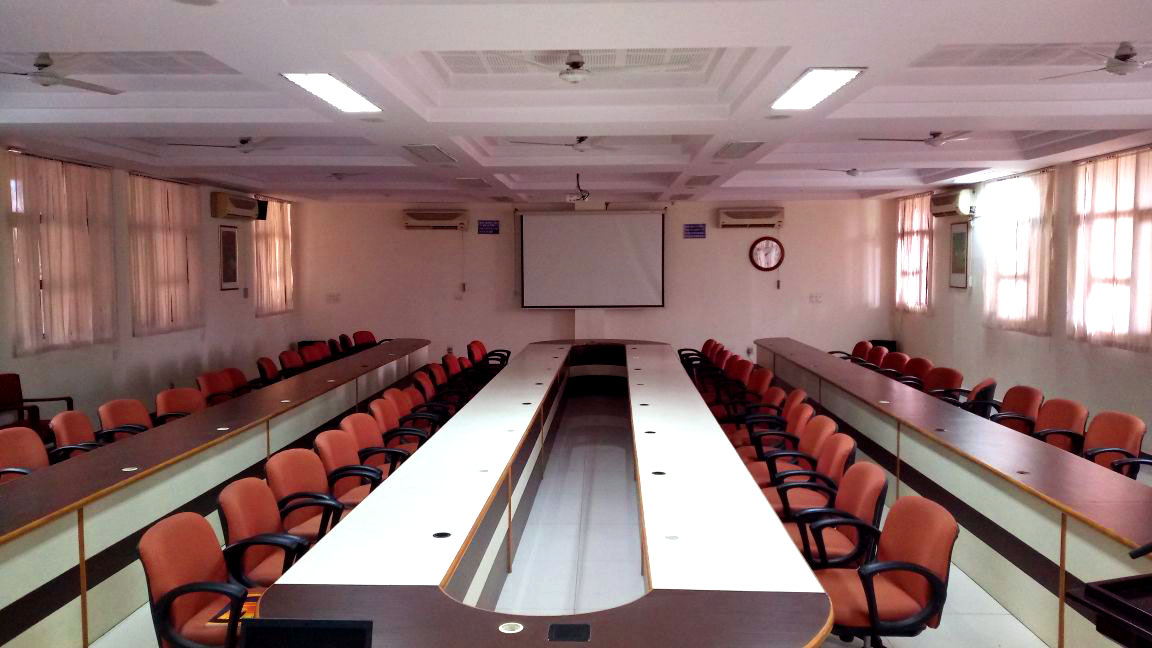
The Main Lecture cum Conference Hall inside IFS, Gurugram.

== See also ==
- Agricultural economics
- Food price crisis
- Food rescue
- Food Security Bill, 2013 legislation in India
- Indian Famine Codes
- UN High-Level Conference on World Food Security (2008)
- List of think tanks in India
