= Jasjit Singh (commodore) =

Indian Air Force officer (1934–2013)

Air Commodore Jasjit Singh AVSM, VrC, VM
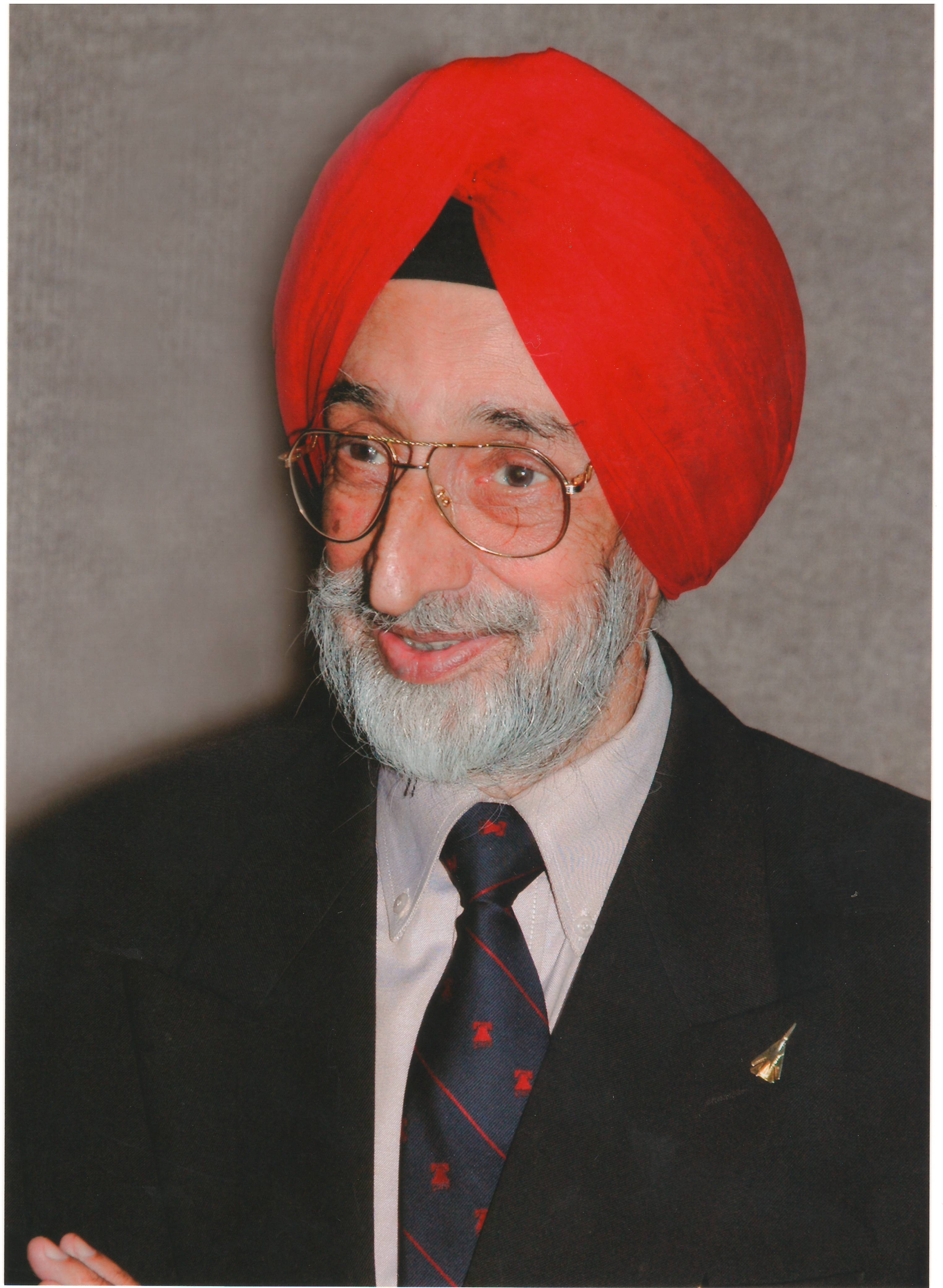
- Air Commodore Jasjit Singh
- Born: 8 July 1934
- Died: 4 August 2013 (aged 79)
- Relatives: Vice Admiral Sanjay Jasjit Singh (son)
- Military career
- Allegiance: India
- Branch: Indian Air Force
- Service years: 1956-1988
- Rank: Air Commodore
- Service number: 5100
- Unit: 3 Squadron
- Commands: No.17 Squadron
- Conflicts: Indo-Pakistani War of 1965; Indo-Pakistani War of 1971; Operation Cactus-Lilly
- Awards: Padma Bhushan; Ati Vishisht Seva Medal; Vir Chakra; Vayu Sena Medal

Air Commodore Jasjit Singh, AVSM, VrC, VM (8 July 1934 – 4 August 2013) was an Indian Air Force officer, writer and military strategist. In his military career, he was awarded the Vir Chakra during the Indo-Pakistani War of 1971. He last served as the director of operations of the IAF.

He later headed the Institute for Defence Studies and Analyses from 1987 to 2001 as its director. In 2001, he founded the think tank Centre for Air Power Studies in New Delhi and served as its director general till his death in 2013.

== Military career ==
Singh was born on 8 July 1934. He was commissioned into the Indian Air Force on 1 April 1956. Selected into the fighter stream of the IAF, he trained as a fighter pilot. In the early years of his career, he served as a Flight Commander in an operational Squadron in the Eastern Sector in 1961-62. He later served as a flying instructor at the Flying Instructors School at Tambaram Air Force Station. He attended the Defence Services Staff College, Wellington in 1968.

=== Vir Chakra ===
During the Indo-Pakistani War of 1971, Singh was a part of No. 3 Squadron IAF. He was awarded the Vir Chakra for gallantry. The citation for the Vir Chakra reads as follows:

Date of Award: 17-12-1971

CITATION

SQUADRON LEADER JASJIT SINGH

(5100) FLYING (PILOT)

During the operations against Pakistan in 1971, Squadron Leader Jasjit Singh flew a number of operational missions over heavily defended enemy areas. In spite of heavy ground opposition he pressed home his attacks and destroyed a number of enemy tanks, gun positions and bunkers. He also supervised the servicing of aircraft and thus ensured maximum serviceability of aircraft for operations.

Throughout, Squadron Leader Jasjit Singh displayed gallantry, professional skill and devotion to duty of a high order.

=== Post-war career ===
On 20 January 1975, Singh was appointed commanding officer of No. 17 Squadron IAF. After over two years in command of the squadron, he was promoted to the rank of Group Captain and moved to Air headquarters as the Director (Flight Safety). He subsequently served as the Director (Offensive Operations), and as Director (Air Induction), both at Air HQ.

== Post-retirement ==
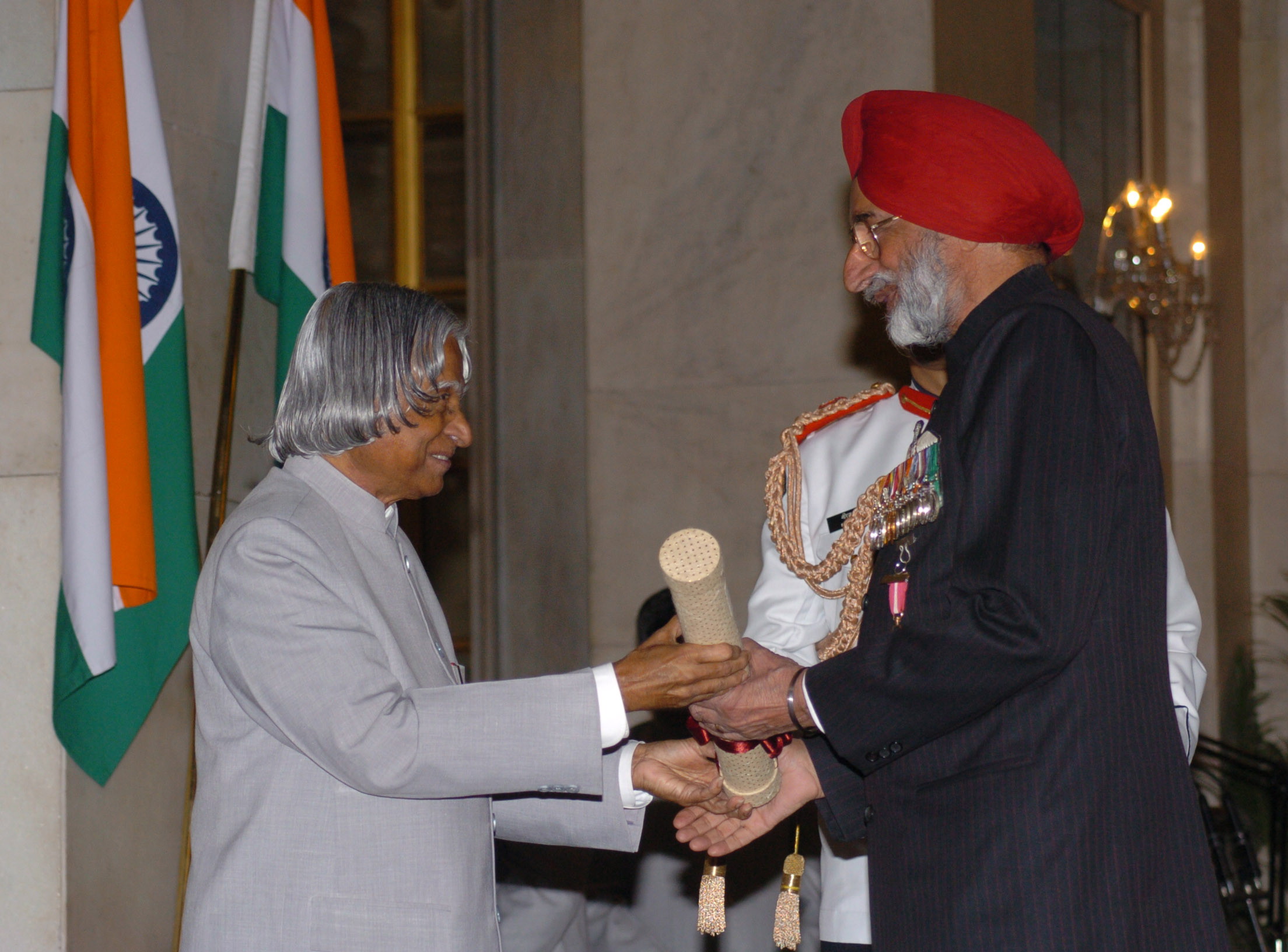
The President, Dr. A.P.J. Abdul Kalam presenting Padma Bhushan to Air Commodore Jasjit Singh, at investiture ceremony in New Delhi on 29 March 2006

Singh founded the Air Force think tank, Centre for Air Power Studies, and also remained longest continuously serving director of Institute for Defence Studies and Analyses (IDSA) from 1987 to 2001.

In 2006, he was awarded the Padma Bhushan by Government of India.

== Bibliography ==
Singh authored multiple books during his time heading the think tanks Institute for Defence Studies and Analyses and the Centre for Air Power Studies.

- Jasjit Singh (1987). AWACS, the new destabiliser. Lancer Press. ISBN 978-81-85096-01-8.
- Jasjit Singh (1988). Air Power in Modern Warfare. Lancer Publishers. ISBN 978-81-7062-047-1.
- Jasjit Singh (1989). Developments In Asia-Pacific Region. Lancer International. ISBN 978-81-7062-079-2.
- Jasjit Singh; Vatroslav Vekarić (1989). Non-provocative Defence: The Search for Equal Security. Lancer Publishers. ISBN 978-81-7062-080-8.
- Jasjit Singh (1990). India and Pakistan: Crisis of Relationship. Lancer Publishers. ISBN 978-81-7062-118-8.
- Jasjit Singh (1990). Superpower detente and future of Afghanistan. Published by Patriot Publishers on behalf of Indian Centre for Regional Affairs. ISBN 978-81-7050-119-0.
- Jasjit Singh (1991). Asian Security: Old Paradigms and New Challenges. Lancer Publishers. ISBN 978-81-7062-114-0.
- Jasjit Singh; Thomas Bernauer (1993). Security of Third World countries. Dartmouth.
- Jasjit Singh (1997). Bridges across the Indian Ocean. Institute for Defence Studies and Analyses.
- Jasjit Singh (1998). Nuclear India. Knowledge World. ISBN 978-81-86019-11-5.
- Jasjit Singh (1999). Kargil 1999: Pakistan's Fourth War for Kashmir. Knowledge World. ISBN 978-81-86019-22-1.
- Jasjit Singh (2000). India's Defence Spending: Assessing Future Needs. Knowledge World. ISBN 978-81-86019-25-2.
- Pervaiz Iqbal Cheema; Jasjit Singh (2000). Defence Expenditure in South Asia: An Overview. Regional Centre for Strategic Studies. ISBN 978-955-8051-11-5.
- Jasjit Singh (2001). Reshaping Asian Security. Knowledge World. ISBN 978-81-87966-03-6.
- Jasjit Singh (2003). Air Power and Joint Operations. Knowledge World. ISBN 978-81-87966-17-3.
- Jasjit Singh (2004). Innovation and knowledge diffusion in the global economy: a thesis. Harvard University.
- Jasjit Singh (2007). Defence from the Skies. Knowledge World. ISBN 978-81-87966-51-7.
- Jasjit Singh (2009). Military Leadership for Tomorrow. KW Publishers Pvt Limited. ISBN 978-81-87966-58-6.
- Jasjit Singh (2009). Bharatiya Parmanu Shastra. Prabhat Prakashan. ISBN 978-81-7315-289-4.
- Jasjit Singh; Centre for Air Power Studies (New Delhi, India) (2012). Essays on China. KW Publishers. ISBN 978-93-81904-23-7.
