= Centre for Land Warfare Studies =

Indian think-tank based in New Delhi, India

- Abbreviation: CLAWS
- Formation: 14 January 2004
- Type: National Security Think Tank
- Location: New Delhi, India
- Director General: Lt Gen Dushyant Singh, PVSM, AVSM (Retd)
- Affiliations: Indian Army
- Website: claws.co.in

The Centre for Land Warfare Studies (CLAWS), New Delhi, India is an autonomous think tank on strategic studies and land warfare. The mandate of CLAWS covers national security issues, conventional military operations and sub-conventional warfare. CLAWS is registered under the Societies Registration Act, 1860 and is a membership-based organisation. It is governed by a Board of Governors and an Executive Council. Research at CLAWS is futuristic in outlook and policy-oriented in approach. CLAWS disseminate the products of its research to its members, members of the armed forces, decision makers, members of the strategic community and interested civilians. It also seeks to contribute to developing a pro-active strategic culture for India. The objective of the organization is to convey policy recommendations based on interactions, consensus and research projects to policymakers and experts. CLAWS has been ranked 171th amongst World Top Defence and National Security Think Tanks as per '2020 Global Go To Think Tank Report' published by University of Pennsylvania, USA.

== Vision ==
The motto of CLAWS is "Victory through Vision". It encapsulates the founding idea of employing academic and practical research to provide actionable knowledge to the strategic community of India and the world.

The vision of CLAWS is to join leading international think tanks in conceptualizing various aspects of land warfare, with special focus for India and its extended neighborhood. CLAWS aspires to attract leading strategic thinkers, defense analysts, scholars and academicians and media persons to deliberate on all facets of land warfare at all levels.

== Areas of interest ==
The mandate of CLAWS covers national security issues, conventional military operations and sub-conventional warfare. The Centre also focuses on conflicts in the region and military developments in countries within India's strategic frontiers, particularly those in the South Asian region. The expanded areas of interest are:

- National Security
- Conventional Military Operations
- Defence Cooperation
- Defence Technology (Cyber Domain, Electronic & Communications Domain, Space Domain, Land Based Conventional Platforms)
- NBC Issues
- China
- Pakistan
- Regional Security (Sri Lanka, Bangladesh, Bhutan, Nepal, Afghanistan, Maldives)
- Sub-conventional Conflict, Terrorism

== Director General ==
| Name | Took office | Left office |
|---|---|---|
| Lt Gen Dushyant Singh, PVSM, AVSM (Retd) | Jan 2024 | Incumbent |
| Lt Gen Podali Shankar Rajeshwar, PVSM, AVSM, VSM, ADC (Retd) | Jan 2023 | Nov 2023 |
| Lt Gen Ranbir Singh, PVSM, AVSM**, YSM, SM, ADC (Retd) | Feb 2022 | Dec 2022 |
| Lt Gen Vijay Kumar Ahluwalia, PVSM, AVSM**, YSM, VSM (Retd) | Jun 2018 | Feb 2022 |
| Lt Gen Balraj Singh Nagal, PVSM, AVSM, SM (Retd) | Dec 2014 | Jun 2018 |
| Maj Gen Dhruv C Katoch, SM, VSM (Retd) | Nov 2012 | Oct 2014 |
| Brig Gurmeet Kanwal (Retd) | Jan 2008 | Mar 2012 |
| Lt Gen Vijay Oberoi, PVSM, AVSM, VSM (Retd) | Jan 2004 | Nov 2007 |

== Activities ==
The CLAWS team comprises serving and retired defence personnel from all services along with civilian experts and support staff. CLAWS is involved in primary and secondary research which is qualitative and quantitative in nature. The topics are contemporary and security oriented having a bearing on India's national security and interests. On its website, CLAWS publishes research articles and reports on workshops, conferences, round-table discussions and guest lectures. The organisation undertakes research projects on national security-related issues, especially those pertaining to land warfare.

== Major publications ==
CLAWS conducts research that is futuristic in outlook and policy-oriented in approach. CLAWS follows a set of publication guidelines in terms of types, content, language, design and printing.

- Publication of the CLAWS Journal commenced in November 2007. It is a bi-annual publication (summer and winter editions).
- The CLAWS Scholar Warrior was published beginning in autumn 2010. It is a bi-annual journal published in spring and autumn.
- CLAWS Issue Briefs first went to press in 2008. This quarterly publication consists of short analytical essays that examine current security issues.
- Publication of the CLAWS Manekshaw Papers began in 2008. Issued monthly, Manekshaw Papers are researched papers on issues of strategic significance.

== See also ==
- Indian Army
- Centre for Air Power Studies (India)
- Institute for Defence Studies and Analyses
- United Service Institution
- List of think tanks in India
