= Jaago Re =

Jaago Re!
- Founded: 2008
- Region served: Cause Marketing, Vote driving, Anti-Corruption
- Product: Tea
- Website: jaagore.com

Tata Tea Jaago Re or JaagoRe is a cause marketing initiative launched in India by Tata Tea, owned by Tata Global Beverages Limited. The campaign, introduced in 2008, works with NGOs and other non-profit organization to raise awareness for specific causes around Indian general elections.

Since 2009, Tata Tea JaagoRe has been an active component of Tata Tea's marketing initiatives. The focus of Tata Tea's JaagoRe campaign has varied through the years.

== Campaigns ==
=== 2009 – 2010 : One Billion Votes ===
In the year 2007, ‘Jaago Re’ launched its very first campaign with an aim to ‘awaken’ the entire nation to the fact that they tend to hold the government accountable to various mishaps and encouraged them to participate in the functioning of the country’s politics by voting.

As part of the campaign, ‘Jaago Re’ released a series of films highlighting how little many Indian citizens knew about the candidates who represented them, such as their credentials. It also launched a website that facilitated voter registration and encouraged young people to vote.

=== 2010 – 2011 : Khilana Bandh, Pilana Shuru ===
Khilana Bandh was primarily aimed at establishing the fact that corruption can be combated if the citizens of the country did not engage in bribery. ‘Jaago Re’ stimulated the citizens of the country to discourage bribery and not contribute to corruption. Through a website, users we encouraged to share Anti-Corruption messages, take pledges against paying or receiving a bribe, and confess if they had paid a bribe.

=== 2011 – 2012 : Soch Badlo ===
‘Soch Badlo’ was aimed at bringing to light the positive stories within the country. ‘'Jaago Re'’ chiefly addressed the positive side to a country that was under a lot of stress through a series of commercials and encouraged people to add a more promising perspective to how they view the country. Jaago Re encouraged citizens to talk about the positive stories surrounding India and share a message of positivity with the rest of India.

=== 2012 – 2013 : Simplify ===
Jaago Re continued on a platform of positivity to "Simplify", where though partnerships with Subject Matter Experts, it would attempt to offer deeper insights on important matters in newspaper headlines.

Simplify was launched on in partnership with CHRI around the topic of "Know Your Police". Content was created on this platform to simplify and educate readers on their rights and obligations in dealing with the Indian Police, and to make readers aware of their legal rights and duties.

=== 2012 – 2013 : Choti Shuruaat ===
With Women's Rights and safety at the forefront of most Indians' minds and the Delhi Rape incident, JaagoRe shifted to a more women centric platform to launch "Choti Shuruaat". The objective of this campaign was to encourage individuals to make small gestures of change towards eliminating preconceived notions that cause Gender Stereotyping.

Jaago Re partnered with leading Indian actor, Shah Rukh Khan and director, R. Balki, to create a public service announcement broadcast on television. In this infomercial, Shah Rukh pledged that he would places names of actresses in his movies, before his own - a trend that was yet unseen in conventional Bollywood cinema till date. As on date, Shah Rukh has maintained this pledge with his new move, Chennai Express, carrying is name after that of the movies female lead, Deepika Padukone. In addition, JaagoRe launch a pledge drive in partnership with Breakthrough - an NGO credited for creating the Bell Bajao Campaign - driving individuals towards making pledges to eradicate gender stereotypes. Over 150,000 pledges have been created till date.

=== 2013 – Ongoing : Power Of 49 ===
The current Jaago Re campaign has centred on women's empowerment. The campaign aims to encourage women - who are 49% of the electorate - to vote as a block in the 2014 Indian General Election, increasing their ability to collectively demand attention and action from election candidates to make changes in their election manifestos towards more women's safety and welfare focussed measures.

== Partnerships ==
Tata Tea Jaago Re has partnered with the following NGOs or has supported their causes

- Janaagraha
- CHRI
- Breakthrough
- Haiyya

== Impact of the campaign ==
The JaagoRe campaign has been well received both by media and by the audience. Industry watchers credit the campaign with increasing recall and monthly market share
