= Construction industry in India =

Secondary sector

The construction industry of India is an important indicator of the development as it creates investment opportunities across various related sectors. With a share of around 8.2%, the construction industry has contributed an estimated ₹670,778 crores (US$ 131 billion) to the national GDP at factor cost in 2011–12. In 2011, there were slightly over 500 construction equipment manufacturing companies in all of India. The sector is labor-intensive and, including indirect jobs, provides employment to more than 49.5 million people.

The construction sector is visualized to play a powerful role in economic growth, in addition to producing structures that add to productivity and quality of life. economic development is a term that economic politicians and others have used frequently in the 20th century, modernization westernization, and especially industrialization are other terms people have used while discussing economic development. economic development has a direct relationship with the environment. government undertaking to meet go abroad economic objectives such as price stability, high employment, and sustainable growth, such efforts include financial and economic policies, regulations of financial industry trade, and tax policies.

== Future challenges ==
India's population is expected to increase to 1.7 billion by 2050, and the results show that this will put a lot of pressure on people. India is facing a problem of inefficiency, which may pose a major problem, the future of the construction industry and world and the development of its infrastructure. However, India's efficiency is very serious, which may be due to the underdeveloped labor force and the time and cost overruns faced by each project.

== Top Construction Leaders in India ==
- Raviraj Realty, Pune
