= Observer Research Foundation =

Indian think-tank based in New Delhi, India

Coordinates: 28.630643°N 77.237465°E

- Formation: 5 September 1990; 36 years ago
- Type: Public policy think tank
- Headquarters: 20, Rouse Avenue Institutional Area, New Delhi – 110002
- Location: New Delhi, India
- Chairman: Sunjoy Joshi
- President: Samir Saran
- Staff: 120
- Website: www.orfonline.org

Observer Research Foundation (ORF) is an independent global think tank based in New Delhi, India. The foundation has three centres in Mumbai, Chennai and Kolkata, with headquarters in New Delhi.

== History ==
ORF was founded in part by the Dhirubhai Ambani family; it claims to operate independently, though. According to some reports, until 2009, 95% of the foundation's budget was provided by Reliance Industries, however, it is now estimated to be around 65% as the foundation diversified its source of finance to the government, foreign foundations, and others.

=== Conflict of interest ===
According to independent media reports published by The Caravan, Samir Saran, a former corporate communications executive at Reliance Industries, despite neither being a subject-matter expert nor having conducted formal research, heads the ORF and appears to play a caretaker role for retired bureaucrats and professionals—many of whom have previously done favors for Reliance and are now being accommodated within the same institution.

On the other hand, Dhruva Jaishankar—son of India’s External Affairs Minister S. Jaishankar and currently heading ORF America—and his joint appearances with his father at events like the Raisina Dialogue (which is also managed by ORF) have raised questions about the think tank’s growing role in Indian diplomacy. Backed by corporate and government support, this has led to concerns about conflicts of interest and the blurring of lines between public and private influence in foreign policy circles.

== Ranking ==
ORF was ranked 20th in the list of top think tanks worldwide in the 2020 edition of the Global Go Think Tank Index Report published by the Think Tanks and Civil Societies Program of the University of Pennsylvania. It was ranked 2nd among think tanks in China, India, Japan and South Korea.

== Similar Organisation ==
The similar organisation also works in India such as Margastha Research Foundation, and Ambika Prasad Research Foundation.

== See also ==
- Raisina Dialogue
- Shangri-La Dialogue
- List of think tanks in India
