= Janaagraha =

Indian non-profit trust

- Founded: 2001 by Ramesh Ramanathan and Swati Ramanathan in India
- Type: Non-profit; NGO
- Services: Improving the quality of life in Indian cities and towns
- CEO: Srikanth Viswanathan
- Website: www.janaagraha.org

Janaagraha Centre for Citizenship and Democracy is a Bengaluru-based non-profit working to improve the quality of life in India's cities and towns. Founded in 2001 by Ramesh Ramanathan and Swati Ramanathan, it started as a movement to include people's participation in public governance and has now evolved into a robust institution for citizenship and democracy. The core idea of Janaagraha's work does not revolve around fixing problems but instead seeking to fix the system that can solve the problems. To achieve this objective, Janaagraha works with citizens to catalyse active citizenship in city neighbourhoods and with governments to institute reforms to city governance (popularly known as “City-Systems”).

Janaagraha believes that improved quality of life is directly linked to improved quality of infrastructure, services, and citizenship. Janaagraha hence works at intersections to fix the city systems across law, policy, institutions with a specific focus on sectors such as Climate Change, Gender Equality & Public Safety, Water and Sanitation, Education, and Public Health using tools and activities like Civic Participation, Municipal Finance, Advocacy and instilling 21st Century skills among youth to empower them to become active citizens. By strengthening urban capacities and resources, Janaagraha aims to achieve its mission of improving City Systems and Quality of life.

== Key Initiatives ==
=== Annual Survey of India's City-Systems (ASICS) ===
ASICS is India's only independent benchmarking of cities using a systemic framework. It evaluates India's city-systems: the complex, mostly-invisible factors (such as laws, policies, institutions, institutional processes) that underpin urban governance and strongly influence the quality of life in India's cities. ASICS is a health diagnostic for cities; the better a city scores, the better it stands to provide its citizens high quality of life in the medium to long term. ASICS aims to provide a common frame of reference for political and administrative leaders, business and academia, media and civil society, in different cities to converge on their agenda for transformative reforms.

The 5th edition of ASICS conducted in 2017 evaluated and scored India's cities on 89 objective parameters developed using the City-Systems framework and compares them with the benchmark cities of London, New York and Johannesburg.

=== My City My Budget (MCMB) ===
MyCityMyBudget is a participatory budgeting initiative aimed at making citizen voices an integral part of the municipal budget making process. Currently conducted every year in collaboration with various Municipal City Corporations, MCMB campaign was first launched as a pilot in a few wards of Bengaluru in 2015-16. It then evolved into a city-wide annual participatory budgeting drive, under the able leadership of the Mayors and Commissioners of Bengaluru, Mangaluru and Vizag.

Under MyCityMyBudget, citizens are encouraged to submit budget inputs either online or through the MyCityMyBudget Van that visits various corners of the city. The campaign entails on-ground mobilisation of citizen community groups, Resident Welfare Associations, Non-governmental organisations working across social and economic lines towards collating budget inputs from citizens. Participatory Budgeting is a democratic tool that allows citizens to decide how public money is spent. It is based on the principle that citizens best understand which civic issues affect them most and their decision helps prioritise allocation of public money. The first experiment with Participatory Budgeting was carried out in Porto Alegre in 1989. Since then, the tool has been adopted by governments and citizens across the world.

Civic Learning is a practical civic education program which aims at empowering the school children of urban India with the knowledge, skills and values necessary to develop a deep sense of ownership and responsibility towards their society and neighbourhood. The program informs the students of their rights and responsibilities as citizens. It demystifies the local government, introduces the students to the relevance of the ward and stresses the need for citizen participation in local governance, thus, catalyzing change.

The objective of Civic Learning program is to reimagine and transform Civic Learning in the country such that the youth in the country can put the learning into practice to improve the quality of life in their local communities.

== Online Initiatives ==
=== I Change My City ===
IChangeMyCity is a social networking initiative that is committed to urban issues - electoral and civic. It aims to initiate change, build networks of communities & local civic bodies, provide data on urban issues, civic awareness & training – all of this at a local neighbourhood level. By providing relevant information in the form of interesting content and a platform to discuss and debate issues of importance, Janaagraha is a platform for people to come together in support for systemic change.

=== I Paid A Bribe (IPAB) ===
IPaidABribe is Janaagraha's initiative to tackle corruption by harnessing the collective energy of citizens. Citizens can report on the nature, number, pattern, types, location, frequency and values of actual corrupt acts on this website. The reports, perhaps for the first time, provide a snapshot of bribes being paid (or taken), across Indian cities. IPaidABribe uses them to argue for improving governance systems and procedures, tightening law enforcement and regulation. Thereby reduce the scope for corruption while obtaining services from the government.

== Offline Initiatives ==
=== Ward Infrastructure Index (WII) ===
Ward Infrastructure Index (WII) programme is a unique initiative to assess quality of life in urban areas. It analyses various wards by its quality of infrastructure and rates them on scale of 0 – 10 (0 being the least and 10 being the best), to give residents and municipalities an easy indicator on how their respective wards measure up against standard benchmarks set by the government. The project looks at services like water supply, electricity, public health, public safety, civic amenities, transport and environment to arrive at a rating. It not only provides valuable information to urban planners and decision makers to streamline delivery of goods and services to different wards but also facilitates direct accountability of local administration and elected representatives to the urban citizens.
