= Manesar land scam =

Scam case in India

Gurugram-Manesar IMT land scam
- Court: Supreme Court of India
- Full case name: Gurugram-Manesar Industrial Model Township land grab scam case

Case history
- Prior action: CBI inquiry
- Subsequent action: Further CBI inquiry

Court membership
- Judges sitting: Adrash Kumar Goel and Udey Umesh Lalit,

Keywords
- Political scams in India

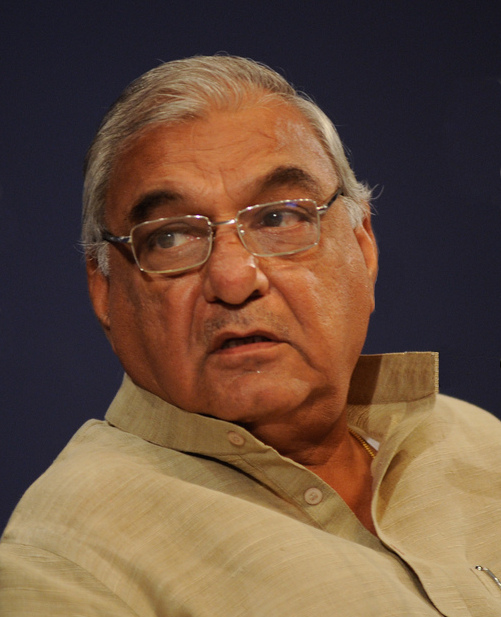
Bhupinder Singh Hooda

The Gurugram-Manesar Industrial Model Township land grab scam case pertains to the chargesheet filed by the Central Bureau of Investigation (CBI) against former Haryana Chief Minister Bhupinder Singh Hooda and 33 others for the Manesar Industrial Model Township land acquisition scam. This scam resulted in INR1500 crore (15 billion) loss to the farmers of Manesar and neighbouring village in Gurugram district whose 688 acre land was being acquired at a low rate for "public purpose". This land was later licensed to real estate companies after granting them out of term favours and concessions. Private builders grabbed 400 acres of land from farmers at throwaway price based on the threat of acquisition by the government. Once this land was bought by the builders, Hooda government released this land from the acquisition process in the favor of builders instead of the original owners. Market value of this 400 acre land was nearly INR4 crore per acre or total INR1600 crore, which was acquired by the builders at only INR100 crore, causing a loss of INR1500 crore to innocent farmer owners of Manesar, Naurangpur and Lakhnoula villages.

Supreme Court of India cancelled this illegal acquisition and grant of land to the builders, returned the land to Haryana government, directed the government to "recover every single pie" and instructed the CBI to investigate it further to expose those who profited from this scam. One of the beneficiary of the scam was Hooda's nephew, Sukhwinder, whose company was given change of land use (CLU) permission for 52 acres land for INR57 lakh on the same day the government land acquisition process had lapsed for the want of release of funds, while at the same time CLU was denied to two other applicants [who were not related to Hooda].

CBI is currently investigating the case further. Hooda and 33 others have been charged in the special CBI court. Next CBI court hearing against Hooda and 33 others will be from 19 April 2018.

There are a total of 6 CBI cases and several other vigilance department investigations against Hooda underway. Central Bureau of Investigation is investigating several scams, mostly related to illegal land grab, that took place during his rule in Haryana. These investigations include the Robert Vadra DLF land grab scam, Gurugram Rajiv Gandhi Trust land grab scam, Sonepat-Kharkhoda IMT land scam case, Garhi Sampla Uddar Gagan land scam, AJL-National Herald Panchkula land grab case, AJL-National Herald Panchkula land grab scam, Haryana Forestry scam case and Haryana Raxil drug purchase scam. He has been already chargesheeted in the Manesar-Gurugram land scam, while other cases are still under investigation (c. March 2018). Hooda acquired land from the illiterate poor farmers at throwaway prices in the name of "public interest" and licensed it to builders by granting them out-of-turn favors, which caused the exponential rise in the land price resulting in big gains for the builders. During his 10-year rule as Chief Minister, Hooda, licensed a massive 24,825 acres of land compared to just 8,550.32 acres by successive Chief Ministers in the 23 years preceding Hooda rule.

== Details ==
=== Modus of scam ===
Builders coerce farmers to sell their land by getting the government to use the Section 4 of the land law to have a government notification issued to the farmer that their land is required for the "public purpose". Builders try to acquire this land by offering a small premium above the government’s rate for the acquisition of the land. If landowners farmers still resist the sale, then Section 6 of land law is applied by declaring the government's intention to acquire land, which forces the reluctant farmers to sell the land to builders at small premium. Once the land is acquired by the builders, government cancels the acquisition process and releases the land to new build owners, along with the change in land use (CLU) permission to build residential and industrial building on the farm land. This results in steep rise in the land prices, resulting in massive gains for the builders, opportunity cost loss to the farmers and land tax revenue loss to the government.

In 2004, Hooda government issued the notification to acquire the 688-acre land for the IMT Manesar. By the time the government retracted the notification, the builders had managed to buy 400 acres for a total price of Rs 100 crore, as opposed to the market value of Rs 1,600 crore. Private builders grabbed this 400 acres land from farmers at throwaway price based on the threat of acquisition by the government. Once this land was bought by the builders, Hooda government released this land from the acquisition process in the favor of builders instead of the original owners. Market value of this 400 acre land was nearly INR4 crore per acre or total INR1600 crore, which was acquired by the builders at only INR100 crore, causing a loss of INR1500 crore to innocent farmer owners of Manesar, Naurangpur and Lakhnoula villages.

"The acquisition process was withdrawn with fraudulent intentions after the land was purchased by the private builders in active connivance with state functionaries. The builders and private entities were aware that the acquisition would not go through. The entire acquisition proceedings were initiated with mala fide intention, illegally and in violation of the provisions of the Land Acquisition Act. It was not a mere bonanza or a deal, but denoted quid pro quo."

— Supreme Court of India,

=== Restoration of land to government by the Supreme Court ===
On 17 September 2015, CBI had registered an FIR under Indian Penal Code sections 420 (cheating), 465 (forgery), 467 (forgery of valuable security), 468 (forgery for purpose of cheating), 471 (using as genuine a forged document) and 120-B (criminal conspiracy) and under section 13 of the Prevention of Corruption Act. After which the premier investigating agency of India, CBI, conducted searches on 24 places to uncover irregularities in the purchase of land from farmers.

On 13 March 2018, Supreme Court cancelled the acquisition of 688 acres in Manesar. Supreme Court cancelled this illegal acquisition and grant of land to the builders by Hooda's government. The land was returned to the Haryana government's HUDA/HSIDC. Land would not be returned to the landholders as they already received more money than the prevailing price. The builders will not be allowed to recover any money they paid to land owners as the deal was done to benefit them and middlemen. Court's decision will not affect 5,000 home buyers who will still receive their refund or property from the government on the original terms and price agreed with the builders.

Court directed the CBI to investigate this case further to unearth unnatural gains received by middle men. Court also instructed the Haryana government to "recover every single pie". Supreme court case was filed by the crusader, Om Prakash Yadav, the former Sarpanch of Manesar, who fought a decade-long battle for ensuring justice for the farmers during which he was threatened several times and was also provided security by the Haryana Police.

=== Current status: Ongoing CBI inquiry and chargesheet ===
Based on the Supreme Court's order to investigate further, Hooda and 33 others, including real estate companies and government officials, were charged by the CBI in the special CBI court on 2 Feb 2018.

The CBI submitted chargesheet against former Haryana Chief Minister, Bhupinder Singh Hooda and 33 others, including real estate companies, officials of department of town and country planning Haryana and bureaucrats who worked with Hooda in his office while he was Chief Minister of Haryana. Hooda's nephew, Sukhwinder, is also one of the beneficiary of the scam. Other accused include senior IAS officials Chattar Singh, M.L. Tayal and S.S. Dhillon, who had worked under Hooda. Atul Bansal of ABW Builders was also chargesheeted. Developers named in the chargesheet are DLF, Unitech Group, ABW, Karma, RP Estate and Innovative.

On 15 March 2018, CBI court summoned Hooda and 33 others for the court hearing to commence from 19 April 2018.

== See also ==
- Corruption in India
- Dynastic politics of Haryana
- National Herald scam
- Rajiv Gandhi Charitable Trust land grab cases
- Robert Vadra land grab cases
- List of scams in India
