= DLF land grab case =

2013 land deals in Haryana, India, and legal case

DLF land grab scam case
- Court: Supreme Court of India

Case history
- Subsequent action: CBI inquiry

Keywords
- Political scams in India

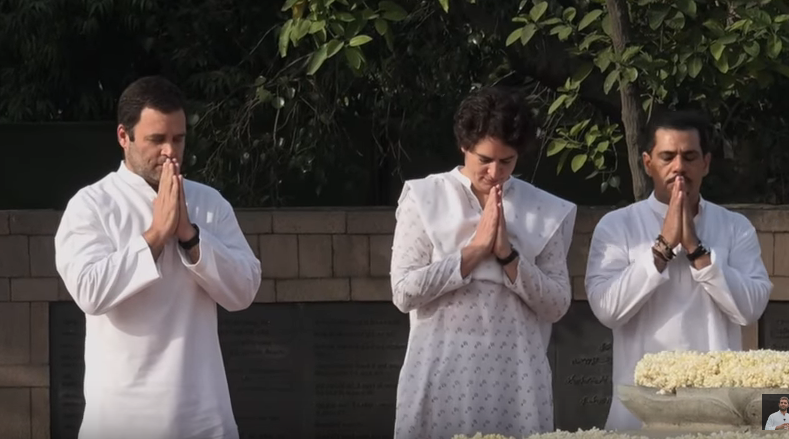
Robert Vadra

DLF land grab case is a case related to alleged 50 acre land grab in 2013 in Amipur village of Haryana during the Congress' Bhupinder Singh Hooda government. The prime accused in this case are Robert Vadra, Hooda and DLF.

There are a total of 6 CBI cases and several other vigilance department investigations against Hooda underway. Central Bureau of Investigation is investigating several scams, mostly related to illegal land grab, that took place during his rule in Haryana. These investigations include the Manesar land scam, Gurugram Rajiv Gandhi Trust land grab scam, Sonepat-Kharkhoda IMT land scam case, Garhi Sampla Uddar Gagan land scam, AJL-National Herald Panchkula land grab case, AJL-National Herald Panchkula land grab scam, Haryana Forestry scam case and Haryana Raxil drug purchase scam. He has been already chargesheeted in the Manesar-Gurugram land scam, while other cases are still under investigation (c. March 2018). Hooda was acquiring land from poor, illiterate farmers at a low rate in the name of "public interest" only to later license this to builders after granting out-of-turn favors that helped the land value increase exponentially. During his 10-year rule as Chief Minister, Hooda, licensed a massive 24,825 acres of land compared to just 8,550.32 acres by successive Chief Ministers in the 23 years preceding Hooda rule.

== Details ==
=== Alleged Modus of scam ===
Vadra had set up Skylight Hospitality in 2007 . In 2008, Skylight Hospitality purchased around 3.5 acres of land in Manesar-Shikohpur in Gurugram for Rs 7.5 crore. After a few days, the then Congress-led Haryana government allowed Skylight Hospitality to develop a housing project on this land. In June 2008, DLF agreed to buy the plot for Rs 58 crore, indicating a multifold increase in the property price. Thus Vadra made a profit of Rs. 50 crores. Vadra was paid in instalments. In 2012 the mutation was done in favour of DLF. The deal allegedly involved obtaining a commercial development license from the Haryana government during this process through Vadra's intervention, which Vadra then sold to DLF, allegedly making huge profit, which raised serious questions about its propriety.

== Initial Enquiry ==
In 2012, retired IAS officer Ashok Khemka, working at that time as the Director General, Consolidation of holdings and land records, Haryana cancelled ownership transfer to the DLF, citing flaws in the process. He was immediately moved out of his office sparking a Nation wide controversy. This issue later became an important Election issue, which the BJP highlighted in its election campaign in 2014.

== Justice Dhingra Commission and subsequent actions ==
After Bharatiya Janata Party (BJP) government came to power in Haryana in 2014, the "Justice Dhingra Commission" was formed in 2015 to investigate the scam. He submitted a 182-page report to the state government on August 31, 2016, but it was never made public though it has come to light that Dhingra Commission's report stated that there was collusion aimed at benefiting Vadra's company Skylight Hospitality, and it sought further inquiry. Dhingra Commission indicted Hooda.

On 01 September 2018, FIR No 288 was registered under Sections 420, 468, 471, 120-B IPC and under Section 13 of Prevention of Corruption Act at Police Station Kherki Daula, Gurugramwas registered against Hooda, Vadra, DLF and Onkareshwar Properties, from whom the property had been purchased by Skylight Hospitality, for alleged criminal conspiracy, cheating, fraud and forgery, and under provisions of the Prevention of Corruption Act. The Haryana Government constituted an SIT in the given matter. and as per certain media reports, this case has now been closed, with the Haryana Police reporting before the Punjab and Haryana High Court that as reported by tehsildar, Manesar, Gurugram, M/s Skylight Hospitality sold 3.5 acres to M/s DLF Universal Limited on September 18, 2019, and no regulation/rules have been violated in the said transaction.

== Enforcement Directorate action ==
On the basis of FIR, Enforcement Directorate (ED) recorded ECIR No. ECIR/06/HIU/2018 on 21 December 2018. It presented its prosecution complaint in July 2025, where ED has alleged that Robert Vadra received ₹58 crore as "proceeds of crime" in the Shikohpur, Haryana land deal case. It filed its case against 11 individuals and entities, including Vadra under relevant provisions of the Prevention of Money Laundering Act (PMLA) for their alleged involvement in the Shikohpur case. It has alleged that Vadra received ₹53 crore through M/s Sky Light Hospitality Private Limited (Vadra's firm) and ₹5 crore through M/s Blue Breeze Trading Private Limited (BBTPL). In May 2026, Vadra has been granted bail by the Rouse Avenue Court in this case, which is presently under Trial.

== See also ==
- Corruption in India
- National Herald scam
- Rajiv Gandhi Charitable Trust land grab cases
- Robert Vadra land grab cases
- List of scams in India
