= Ashok Khemka =

Indian Administrative Service officer (born 1965)

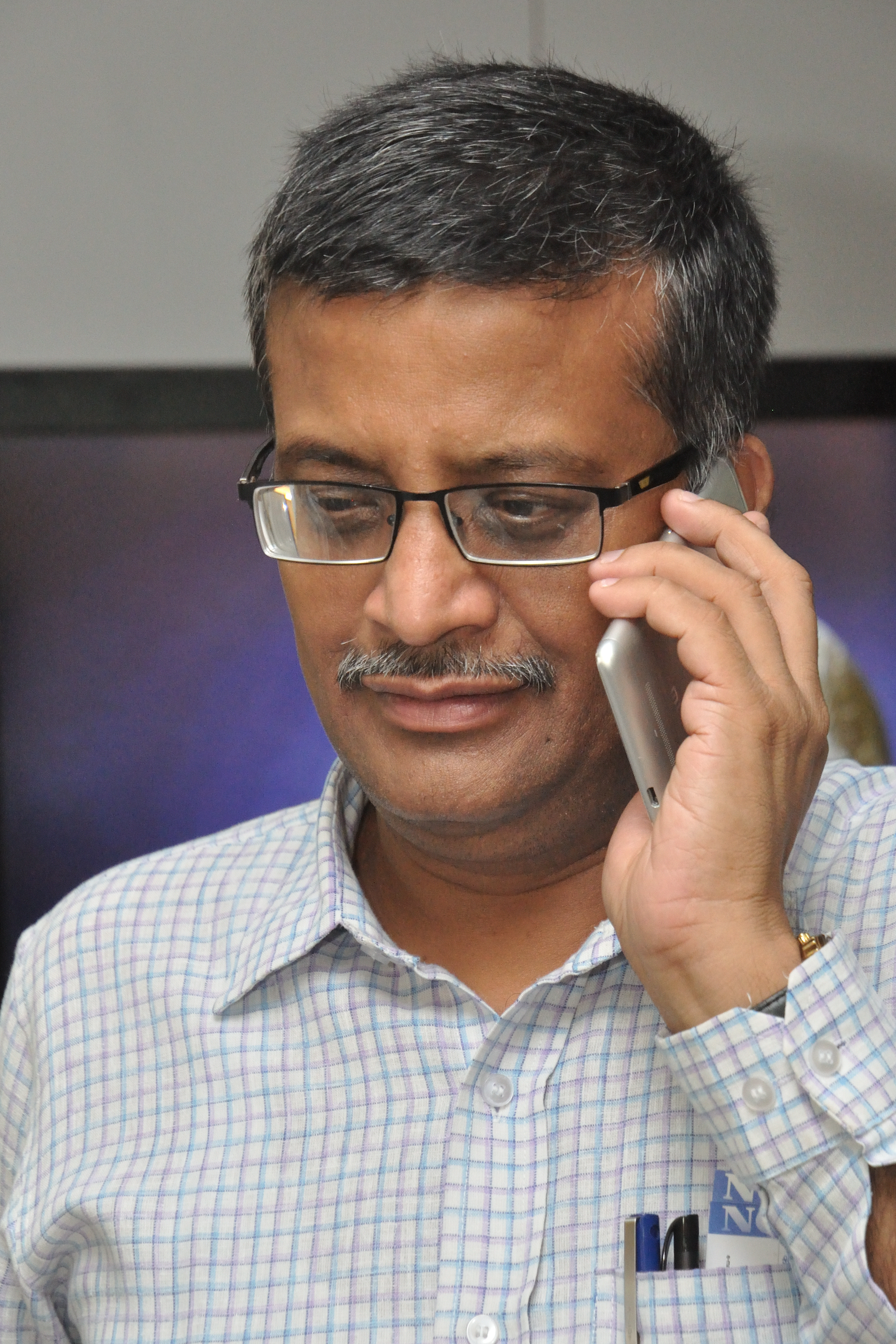
- Ashok Khemka at a public event in Kolkata, 2016
- Born: 30 April 1965 (age 61); Kolkata, West Bengal, India
- Education: IIT Kharagpur (B.Tech); Tata Institute of Fundamental Research (Ph.D); MBA; Indira Gandhi National Open University (MA)
- Occupation: Bureaucrat
- Years active: 1991–2025
- Employer: Government of India
- Organisation: Indian Administrative Service
- Known for: IAS officer who cancelled the mutation of the Robert Vadra–DLF land deal

Ashok Khemka (born 30 April 1965) is a retired Indian Administrative Service officer of 1991 batch from Haryana cadre who formerly served as Additional Chief Secretary in the Government of Haryana. During his career of more than three decades, he worked solely for the state of Haryana. without a single deputation to the Central Government. He has been transferred 66 times during his career, making him the second-most transferred bureaucrat in Haryana, surpassed only by retired IAS officer Pradeep Kasni. Regarded as a whistleblower, Khemka is known for reporting irregularities and corruption in various departments where he served, including investigations into land deals during the tenure of former Haryana Chief Minister Bhupinder Hooda. He has been associated with inquiries into cases such as the DLF land grab case, the Sonipat-Kharkhoda IMT land case, and the Garhi Sampla Uddar Gagan land case.

== Early life and education ==
Ashok Khemka was born in Kolkata, India. He earned a Bachelor of Technology in Computer Science and Engineering from IIT Kharagpur in 1988, followed by a Ph.D. in Computer Science from the Tata Institute of Fundamental Research (TIFR) and an MBA specialising in Business Administration and Finance. He also holds an MA in Economics from the Indira Gandhi National Open University (IGNOU). In 2016, he expressed interest in becoming a lawyer and later earned Bachelor of Laws degree from Panjab University.

== Career ==
=== Civil service ===
After clearing the Civil Services Examination, Khemka joined the Indian Administrative Service (IAS) and was placed into the Haryana cadre of the 1991 batch. He has been transferred repeatedly by various state governments in Haryana after he exposed alleged corruption in the departments he was posted to.

In 2012, Khemka came under limelight he canceled a land deal worth ₹57 million (US$590,000) crore between DLF Universal, a major real estate player. Khemka cited corrupt practices as the reason for halting the deal. This led to backlash, and in 2013, the Haryana government, under then chief minister Bhupinder Singh Hooda, filed a charge-sheet accusing him of overstepping his authority. The charge-sheet was leaked to the media before Khemka even received it, with a Hindi newspaper publishing it ahead of time. As a result, Khemka was transferred from his position overseeing land acquisitions to a less influential role in the archives and archaeology department.

Khemka was posted as Secretary to the Govt. of Haryana, Department of Archives and Archaeology on 4 April 2013 and was also given the charge of DG Archives and Archaeology on 26 April 2013. This was his 45th posting in his 20-year career, excluding his 2-year training period. He also reported a deal that he considered irregular and requested an inquiry by the CBI. The government of Haryana refused to investigate and a Bhiwani-based NGO filed PIL on the matter. On 18 October 2013, the CBI registered a preliminary enquiry into alleged irregularities in the purchase of wheat seeds in Haryana Seeds Development Corporation, seeking registration of a case against officials of the National Cooperative Consumers Federation and the National Agriculture Cooperative Marketing Federation for allegedly selling seeds at inflated prices to Haryana Seeds Development Corporation.

Khemka was previously the Managing Director in Haryana Seeds Development Corporation.

=== Chargesheets filed against Khemka ===
In October 2013, two chargesheets were filed against Khemka, one of which accused him of failing his responsibilities at the Haryana Seed Development Corporation.

=== Transfers under Khattar regime ===
The transfers continued under the Manohar Lal Khattar-led government, after the Bharatiya Janata Party came to power in 2014. Khemka was made the transport commissioner in November 2014, truck owners went on strike after he launched a drive against overloading, oversized goods vehicles and irregularities in the state's transport licensing system. In April 2015, he was once again moved to the archaeology department.

In October 2017, Khemka, as the principal secretary of the Department of Social Justice and Women Empowerment, reportedly disagreed with Minister Krishna Bedi over the latter allegedly misusing a department vehicle for over a year. He also reportedly objected to special treatment given to Khattar's staff on the eve of Diwali. In November, he was transferred as the principal secretary in the youth affairs and sports department. In March 2019, he was transferred, for the 52nd time, to the Science and Technology Department.

=== Posting detail ===
As of March 2019, Khemka had been posted in 51 departments and was DG of Archives & Archaeology in Haryana state.

=== Breach of trust allegations ===
In May 2022, former Haryana IAS officer Roshan Lal, former chairman of a committee for selecting candidates in the Haryana State Warehousing Corporation (HSWC) during Ashok Khemka's tenure as managing director, accused Khemka of appointing ineligible candidates as managers (Grade-I) based on dubious considerations, causing a breach of trust. When asked, Khemka declined to comment on the issue.

== Highlighted land deal corruption ==
Khemka highlighted land deal corruption in and around Gurgaon, India for conversion of commercial land, reportedly between ₹20,000 crore (US$2 billion) to ₹350,000 crore (US$36 billion). Khemka was most recently Haryana's Director-General of Land Consolidation and Land Records-cum-Inspector-General of Registration. During his 80-day stint in the department, Khemka detected irregularities in land transactions involving the transfer of panchayat land worth several hundred crores of rupees to newly created real estate companies. Khemka was transferred on 11 October 2012 and took action on the matter after his transfer. He claims to have been harassed and transferred 40 times in the last 21 years for doing his job. As the managing director of Haryana Seeds Development Corporation Limited, Khemka exposed its irregularities, following which he was transferred on 4 April 2013 and was replaced by B. S. Duggal, a Deputy Secretary five ranks below him. Khemka is often regarded as a whistleblower.

=== Vadra land deal ===
The State Government constituted an Inquiry Committee of three senior IAS officers to investigate Khemka's cancellation of Vadra's land deal in the village Sikhohpur (Gurgaon). Khemka responded to the report of the Inquiry Committee in his comments to the State Government, which is divided into 8 Chapters. The specific land deal of Robert Vadra is detailed in the 6th Chapter.

Rao Inderjit Singh, a member of the Lok Sabha from Gurgaon, has said that a detailed inquiry must be conducted to "substantiate or refute" the charges against Robert Vadra, whose business deals with real estate major DLF have been questioned by Ashok Khemka. He said that Vadra's land dealings should be part of a larger investigation into alleged irregular practices in the government's appropriation and sale of nearly 1200 acres.

=== Khemka′s Death Threat ===
Following his expression of apprehensions regarding the appropriation of land by Robert Vadra, (Priyanka Gandhi's spouse), Khemka claimed that he had been subjected to threats on his life. A concern was raised regarding land transactions involving Robert Vadra, the son-in-law of Congress president Sonia Gandhi.

In November 2023, the Haryana Government designated TVSN Prasad, the Financial Commissioner of Revenue, to address a series of grievances lodged by Ashok Khemka concerning the conduct of another official, Sajeev Verma.

In March 2024, the Supreme Court annulled the High Court's decision regarding the elevated ACR grade awarded to Officer Ashok Khemka.

== See also ==
- Anil Swarup
- Rajni Sekhri Sibal
- Sanjiv Chaturvedi
