= Haryana Raxil drug purchase case =

Haryana Raxil drug purchase scam case
- Court: Central Bureau of Investigation
- Full case name: Haryana Raxil drug purchase scam case

Case history
- Subsequent action: CBI inquiry

Keywords
- Political scams in India

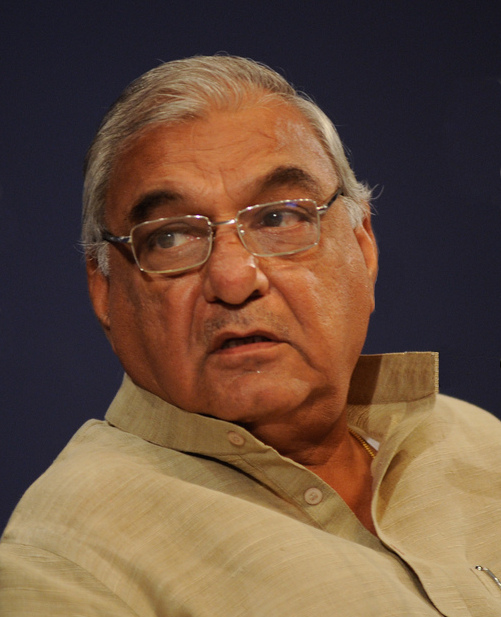
Bhupinder Singh Hooda in 2010

Haryana Raxil drug purchase scam case is a case under investigation by the Central Vigilance Commission (CVC) and the Central Bureau of Investigation (CBI) against Bhupinder Singh Hooda for the illegal purchase of Raxil fungicide which resulted in INR80 crore (800 million) loss to the government. This scam, initially exposed by Ashok Khemka, is also pending in the Punjab and Haryana High Court.

== Details ==
=== Modus of scam ===
Raxil, manufactured by Bayer, is used to treat the seeds for Karnal bunt. Hooda government had purchased Raxil worth INR 100 crore for the treatment of seeds to be distributed to the farmers. Raxil, which is not registered with the Pesticide Management Board and costs INR1350 per kg, was preferred over the generic brands which cost only INR300 per kg. In spite of this, Raxil was the sole drug recommended by the Hooda administration. As a result, there is a High Court case underway for causing the loss to government for preferring only one drug, that too an unregistered and expensive drug, over other drugs. Use of Raxil was discontinued by the new BJP government, case was referred to Parliamentary Standing committee, CVC and High Court, as well as to CBI.

=== Current status: CBI inquiry ===
After the initial inquiry by the Central Vigilance Commission (CVC), subsequently, Chief Minister Manohar Lal Khattar's BJP Government of Haryana referred the case to CBI to conduct further investigation against Hooda and others. Taking cognizance of the reference sent by Haryana government regarding the alleged multi-crore fungicide (RAXIL) purchase scam, the Union Government issued a notification on Thursday for a probe by the Central Bureau of Investigation (CBI) into the case. Haryana asked for a CBI investigation into the alleged financial corruption as well as the into the reasons under which "the then MD, HSDC, Ashok Khemka was prematurely transferred out of HSDC on April 4 and a junior departmental officer BS Duggal was posted as MD, HSDC".

== See also ==
- Corruption in India
- National Herald scam
- Rajiv Gandhi Charitable Trust land grab cases
- Robert Vadra land grab cases
- List of scams in India
