= Sonipat–Kharkhoda IMT land case =

Sonepat-Kharkhoda IMT land case
- Court: Supreme Court of India
- Full case name: Sonepat-Kharkhoda Industrial Model Township land scam case
- Decided: 4 February 2014

Case history
- Subsequent action: CBI inquiry

Keywords
- Political scams in India

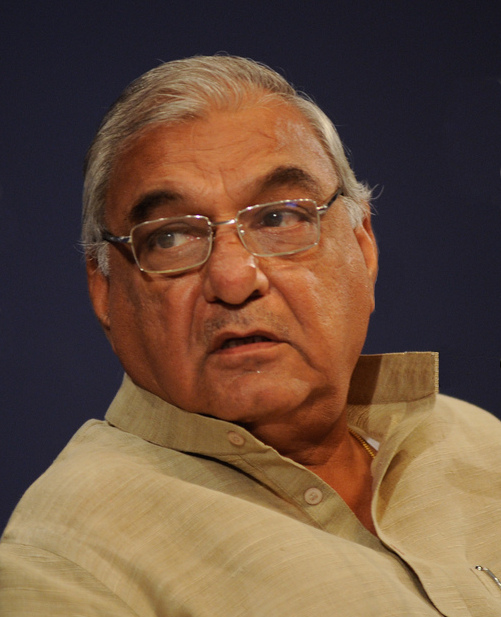
Bhupinder Singh Hooda in 2010

Sonepat-Kharkhoda Industrial Model Township land case being investigated by the Central Bureau of Investigation (CBI) against Bhupinder Singh Hooda. This under-investigation scam pertains to acquisition of 700 acre land in 3 villages near Kharkhoda in Sonepat district for the Industrial Model Township.. Punjab and Haryana High Court in March 2013 and the Supreme Court of India in May 2016 had cancelled the government's decision to release land to the private builder. Two senior officials in then Chief Minister Hooda's office were indicted for allegedly favouring the developers. Subsequently, in 2018 the Government of Haryana referred the case to CBI to investigate the against Hooda and others.

== Details ==
=== Modus of scam ===
"The state's power of eminent domain was abused to force farmer-landowners to sell their lands to private colonizer. The licences became the basis subsequently to release land causing wrongful benefits to the private colonizer."

— Ashok Khemka, IAS,

Ashok Khemka, a senior Indian Administrative Service officer in of Haryana known for exposing corruption and for cancelling the mutation of Sonia Gandhi's son-in-law Robert Vadra's illegal land deal in Gurgaon, had written to Chief Minister and Chief Secretary of Haryana to seek the CBI investigation, with the findings that both Rohtak and Sonipat land scams were more blatant than the Manesar scam. In 2005, Haryana State Industrial and Infrastructure Development Corporation (HSIIDC) notified 885 acres for acquisition for housing colony for industrial workers in sectors 59 and 60 of Sonipat, out of which 300-acre land was illegally released to a private builder.

418 acres in Sonipat was released from acquisition in the same way as it was done in Gurugram-Manesar IMT land scam Manesar during Hooda’s administration. 642 acres of land in 5 villages was notified for acquisition for developing residential and commercial sectors, by Haryana Urban Development Authority, and a notification was issued on 16 January 2004 to acquire 623.70 acres resulting in sales of land by farmers to builders at throwaway prices under the threat of acquisition. Once 418 acre of notified land was acquired by builders at throwaway prices, this was denotified and released from the acquisition, resulting in the illegal windfall gains for the builders at the expense of farmers.

"Out of more than 600 acres of land decided to be acquired for that purpose, more than 418 acres of land already stands released in favour of the private builders. Colourable exercise of power for benefit of private builders in whose favour the land ... has been released after the issuance of Section 6."

— Punjab and Haryana High Court, 4 February 2014,

=== Current status: CBI inquiry ===
Subsequently, in March 2018 the Chief Minister Manohar Lal Khattar BJP's Government of Haryana referred the case to CBI to conduct further investigation against Hooda and others. Supreme Court had also ordered Haryana Government to take action on the Dhingra Commission's report, set up to investigate grant of land licences, so that "pending issues could be cracked".

== See also ==
- Corruption in India
- National Herald scam
- Rajiv Gandhi Charitable Trust land grab cases
- Robert Vadra land grab cases
- List of scams in India
