= Kargil coffin scam =

1999 Indian defence procurement scandal

The Kargil coffin scam refers to the case involving the purchase of US-made coffins for Indian soldiers killed during the Kargil military conflict. A Comptroller and Auditor General (CAG) report in 2001 raised the question over why the aluminium caskets were contracted for around $2,000 per piece when they were available in transactions elsewhere for $172 each.

The report revealed that the government overpaid for coffins during the Kargil war – and that around Rs 1,762 crore worth of supplies (over four-fifths of the total) to help fight the conflict were delivered more than six months after it ended.

== Background ==
After the Kargil war that took place in 1999 between Indian Army and Pakistani soldiers and irregulars in the Kargil sector of India, there were allegations of corruption in the purchase of coffins by the then Government of India. The government had incurred a heavy loss of $187,000 in the entire transaction. Comptroller and Auditor General of India's report had found several fraud in the transaction of coffins.

== US supplier ==
The caskets were purchased from Buitron and Baiza, a company based in United States of America rendering funeral services. The then ruling government National Democratic Alliance had purchased 500 caskets worth $2500 each which was presumed to be thirteen times the original amount.

== Ambassador's position ==
However, the ambassador from both the countries India and United States of America had declared in writing that those caskets had a cost worth $2,768 each.

Writing in the Times of India, Chidanand Rajghatta had argued that the "coffins were not meant to carry Kargil martyrs", these were not "traditional coffins" but rather reusable aluminium 'transfer cases', and had been sought by the Ministry of Defence after "first hand accounts by indian officers -- who served on a peacekeeping mission in Somalia".

The CBI investigated the case and filed a charge sheet against three Indian Army officers in August 2009. In December 2013, a special CBI court found no evidence and hence discharged all the accused.

== CBI Investigation ==
The Central Bureau of Investigation (CBI) registered a case in June 2006 registered a case under sections 420 (cheating), 120 B (criminal conspiracy) and the Prevention of Corruption Act, 1988. The CBI filed a charge sheet in August 2009. Three major Indian Army officers and a company based in the United States were named in the charge sheet. The three Army officers named were Major General Arun Roye, Colonel SK Malik and Colonel FB Singh. Victor Baiza, a US National who supplied the aluminium casket and body bags to the Indian Army was also named in the charge sheet. However, the then defense minister George Fernandes was not included in the report and was later given a clean chit from the scam.

In December 2013, a special CBI court found no evidence and hence discharged all the accused.

== Supreme Court verdict ==
On Oct 13, 2015, the Supreme Court Of India absolved former Defence Minister George Fernandes and former Prime Minister Atal Bihari Vajpayee of all wrongdoing in the Kargil coffin scam.

== See also ==
- Corruption in India
- Socio-economic issues in India
- Corruption Perceptions Index
