= AJL-National Herald Panchkula land grab case =

Punjab and Haryana High Court case

AJL-National Herald Panchkula land grab scam case
- Court: Punjab and Haryana High Court

Keywords
- Political scams in India

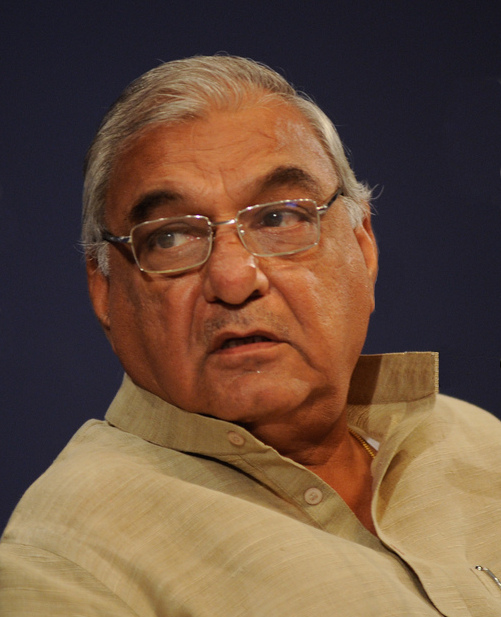
Bhupinder Singh Hooda in 2010

AJL-National Herald Panchkula land grab case, allegedly against Bhupinder Singh Hooda currently in the Punjab and Haryana High Court, is under investigation by the Central Bureau of Investigation (CBI) and Enforcement Directorate (ED). This case pertains to Hooda's alleged role for misusing his position as then Chief Minister of Haryana to cause wrongful gains to the Associated Journals Limited (AJL) and corresponding loss to the Government of Haryana, by illegally allotting a government plot of land worth several crores rupees (billions) to AJL for INR 59 lakh (5.9 million). Then Chief Minister, Hooda, was also the chairman of HUDA, a government entity which re-allotted the plot to AJL in 2005 in violations of rules and against the advice of the HUDA officials. Chief Minister Manohar Lal Khattar's BJP government of Haryana transferred the case to CBI, and CBI filed the FIR in April 2016. CBI booked Hooda for criminal conspiracy, criminal breach of trust, cheating and misuse of official position by public servants. AJL, which also owns National Herald, is controlled by the Indian National Congress leaders Sonia Gandhi and Rahul Gandhi among others.

AJL was not legally entitled to the allotment. The CBI allege that AJL was originally allotted the plot in 1982, with the condition that construction would start within six months, and would be completed within two years. However, this didn't happen, and in 1996 ownership was repossessed by the government due to non-construction within the mandatory period. AJL's applications to have the plot re-allotted were dismissed in 1995 and again in 1996. AJL waited for a favorable entity to come to power to get the re-allotment. When Hooda became Chief Minister in 2005, he illegally re-allotment the plot to the AJL.

== Details ==
=== Modus of scam ===
"[Bhupinder Singh Hooda] misused his position and caused wrongful gains to the AJL and corresponding loss to the state exchequer."

— Enforcement Directorate,

In this AJL-National Herald Panchkula land grab scam, the Congress government gave the National Herald 3,500 square meters of plot number C-17 in Sector 6 of Panchkula in Haryana in 1982 [during Bhajan Lal's Indian National Congress rule] to publish a newspaper, but for ten years, there was no newspaper published from here. Hence, as per the rules the land should have been returned to the government, but the ownership was illegally transferred to AJL/National Herald by Hooda government in 2013. This case and National Herald's possession of INR 2000 crores worth land are being currently investigated by the Central Bureau of Investigation (c. December 2017). Against the advice of HUDA officials to re-advertise the plot for auction and to honor the legal precedence/remembrance (prior rejections of AJL's application for the re-allotment), Hooda re-allotted it to AJL in 2005 at the original 1982 rates with interest.

=== Applicable sections of penal code ===
FIR, filed on the complaint of Haryana State Vigilance Bureau's deputy superintendent, Ashok Kumar, has following sections of the Indian Penal Code: Sections 409, 420 and 120-B. CBI's DSP, R.S. Gunjiyal, was mentioned in FIR the investigating officer (IO) of the case.

=== Investigating agencies ===
Case was initially investigated by the Haryana State Vigilance Bureau, then taken over by the ED and CBI.

=== Persons under investigation ===
CBI's FIR mentions then chairman of HUDA, which is Bhupinder Singh Hooda. ED has also questioned both Hooda and Motilal Vora who were confronted with the ceased documents in this case.

== Current status ==
On 1 December 2018, CBI filed the chargesheet against Hooda, Moti Lal Vohra and AJL Ltd for the allotment of 3360 sqm plot in Sector 6 in 2005 in violation of the rules. As per the chargesheet, the plot was originally allotted in 1982, but allotment automatically lapsed as no construction was carried out within the prescribed ten years, resulting in HUDA (now called HSVP) retaking the ownership of the plot in 1992. Chargesheet states that Bhupinder Singh Hooda, who was then chairman of HUDA and chief minister of Haryana, re-allotted the plot in 2005 at 1982 price with interest by violating the rules, resulting in loss of INR 620,000 to the govt of Haryana. On 3 December 2018, ED also attached the said plot under the Prevention of Money Laundering Act.

In a big blow to the Gandhis, the Enforcement Directorate permanently attached properties worth Rs.64 crore in the National Herald land grab Case in May 2019.

On 25 February 2026, the Punjab and Haryana High Court dismissed the case related to the Panchkula land allotment, holding that no prima facie case was made out. The court granted relief to Bhupinder Singh Hooda and Associated Journals Limited, effectively giving them a clean chit in the matter.

== Related AJL scam cases ==
A separate AJL owned National Herald scam case against Sonia Gandhi and Rahul Gandhi is going on in the Supreme court, filed by Subramanian Swamy, for the alleged criminal misappropriation by both Sonia Gandhi and Rahul Gandhi in which the courts have determined that a prima face case has been established. Associated Journals Limited is an unlisted public company limited by shares, ownership of which was transferred to Young India in 2011. AJL published the National Herald newspaper and also owns real estate worth at ₹50 billion (US$520 million) in various cities including New Delhi, Lucknow, Bhopal, Mumbai, Indore, Patna and Panchkula.

== See also ==
- Corruption in India
- National Herald scam
- Rajiv Gandhi Charitable Trust land grab cases
- Robert Vadra land grab cases
- List of scams in India
