= Sanjay Bhandari Arms Deal case =

Indian Criminal Case

The matter pertains to the contract for the supply of 75 Pilatus basic trainer aircraft to the Indian Air Force (IAF). The deal was of Rs 2895 crore and was sealed in the year 2009. Bhandari is said to have got a kickback of approximately Rs. 350 crores to influence the defence deal. It has been alleged that kickbacks were paid by Bhandari to these IAF officers.

The matter was referred to the Central Bureau of investigation for enquiry. CBI registered a formal FIR against Sanjay Bhandari and others.

Later Congress leader Priyanka Gandhi's husband Robert Vadra has also been charged in this case.
