= Vadra =

Vadra is a surname. Notable people with the surname include:

- Priyanka Gandhi Vadra (née Gandhi, born 1972), Indian politician
- Robert Vadra (born 1969), Indian businessman, husband of Priyanka
