= Sanjiv Chaturvedi =

Indian Forest Service officer (born 21 December 1974)

- Born: 21 December 1974 (age 51)
- Education: Motilal Nehru National Institute of Technology (B.Tech.)
- Occupation: Bureaucrat (Indian Forest Service)
- Years active: 2002–present
- Employer: Government of India
- Organization: Indian Forest Service
- Known for: Exposing corruption in the Haryana government and AIIMS; Director, Corbett Tiger Reserve; Conservation Research projects in Uttarakhand
- Awards: Ramon Magsaysay Award (2015); S. R. Jindal Prize (2011)

Sanjiv Chaturvedi (born 21 December 1974) is an Indian Forest Service (IFS) officer posted as Chief Conservator of Forest (Research) at Haldwani in the Nainital district of Uttarakhand. Chaturvedi was a Chief Vigilance Officer (CVO) at AIIMS, New Delhi from 2012 to 2014, and served in the government of Haryana from 2005 to 2012.

== Professional life in Brief ==
Sanjiv Chaturvedi graduated as an electrical engineer in 1995 from the Motilal Nehru National Institute of Technology, situated at Prayagraj, Uttar Pradesh. He became an Indian Forest Service (IFS) officer 2002 with Haryana cadre and later got transferred to Uttarakhand Cadre.

Chaturvedi was a whistleblower in the Haryana Forestry case, which occurred under the regime of Bhupinder Singh Hooda and Kiran Chaudhary. He was a whistleblower later in larger scams in the health sector during his tenure as chief vigilance officer of AIIMS. Chaturvedi managed the Corbett Tiger Reserve, and undertook conservation and research projects in the state of Uttarakhand.

== Career in Haryana ==
As an IFS officer in Haryana, Chaturvedi served from August 2005 to June 2012 in Kurukshetra, Fatehabad, Jhajjar and Hisar, where he publicised corruption in mining, licensing, fake herbal park, fake plantation and instances of illicit felling and poaching in protected areas. Collectively known as the Haryana Forestry case, it involved Haryana chief minister Bhupinder Singh Hooda, forest minister Kiran Chaudhary and several other senior politicians and officers.

=== Kurukshetra posting ===
Chaturvedi's first posting was in Kurukshetra, where he registered a first information report against contractors for large-scale, illicit tree felling and poaching of hog deer in the nearby Saraswati Wildlife Sanctuary. He was reprimanded by the Principal Secretary (Forests) and transferred to Fatehabad on 30 May 2007. The contractors were linked with the Hansi-Butana canal project and were associates of the chief minister. In his report, Chaturvedi noted serious violations of the Wildlife Protection Act, 1972, the Forest Conservation Act of 1980 and a number of Supreme Court orders in undertaking construction work inside a wildlife sanctuary without statutory approvals. Although Chaturvedi's actions angered the government, an NGO later filed a case before the Supreme Court's Central Empowered Committee; the committee upheld all charges and fined the government of Haryana ₹1 crore.

=== Fatehabad posting ===
In Fatehabad, Chaturvedi found that large amounts of public money were spent on private land to develop an herbal park. The land belonged to local Congress member Prahlad Singh Gillakhera, who became Chief Parliamentary Secretary of Forest after winning the MLA election. Gilakhera was reportedly close to Haryana Forest Minister Kiran Chawdhry. A July 2007 letter from the Haryana Principal Chief Conservator of Forests to Chaturvedi said that the Forest Minister was "annoyed" because work on the herbal park had been stopped.

On 3 August 2007, Haryana Chief Minister Hooda, suspended Chaturvedi without specifying a reason. On 14 September of that year, the government issued a charge sheet to dismiss him from service. The suspension order was revoked on 3 January 2008 by President Pratibha Patil, who also censured the Hooda government. The Hooda government did not withdraw the charge sheet against Chaturvedi and forest minister Kiran Choudhry returned the file for further comments. The Hooda government blocked Chaturvedi's promotion by keeping the charge sheet pending for over three years, and later had to compensate him and concede in writing that he had been framed.

Soon after Chaturvedi's suspension, corruption in the herbal park was brought to the Supreme Court by the NGO Ekta Parishad. The Haryana government was required to transfer management of the land to the Haryana Forest Department under section 38 of the Indian Forest Act of 1927.

=== Jhajjar posting ===
When his suspension was lifted by the president in January 2008, Chaturvedi was assigned to a non-cadre post. After objections from the Central Administrative Tribunal, he was posted as a divisional forest officer (DFO) in Jhajjar in January 2009 and exposed a fake-plantation scheme the following month in which a large sum of public money had been embezzled; as a result, 40 forest staffers were charged and 10 were suspended. Chaturvedi suspected that senior officers were involved, and requested an investigation.

Subsequently, Chaturvedi started facing harassment in form of bogus cases. In 2012, the Hooda government charged Chaturvedi with neglecting plantation maintenance. The charge was dismissed by the president of India in October 2013, who called it "unsustainable". After a central-government inquiry, the OSD of the Chief Minister of Haryana was found to be involved in the charge.

=== Hisar posting ===
The Haryana Chief Minister's Office transferred Chaturvedi to the Hisar division in August 2009, and Chaturvedi exposed another fake-plantation scheme. In January 2010, he sealed a plywood unit for colluding with senior forest officers to pay just ₹26,000 instead of ₹2,200,000 as a license fee. In May 2010, when Chaturvedi went abroad for 18 days of official training, the Chief Minister's Office declared his post vacant. After a month without a job, Chaturvedi was appointed a DFO (Production) in the division.

=== Harassment by Haryana govt and presidential intervention ===
Chaturvedi reported harassment after exposing corruption. Several false criminal cases were filed against him, including theft of a Kachnar tree and abetting a suicide. During his tenure as an officer in Haryana, Chaturvedi was transferred 12 times in five years.

Alleging harassment by the Haryana state government, Chaturvedi complained to President Pratibha Patil in 2010; Patil referred his case to the Cabinet Secretariat, who directed the Ministry of Environment and Forests to convene a two-member panel to study the accusations. The inquiry found merit in Chaturvedi's allegations that year and referred the case to the CBI, whose preliminary analysis found his allegations worthy of investigation. The ministry then referred the case to the Central Vigilance Commission (CVC) and recommended a CBI investigation.

The president's order censured the Haryana state government for harassing Chaturvedi by blocking his promotion and transferring him. This was based on the panel report, which reprimanded minister Kiran Choudhry; the Chief Minister's Officer on Special Duty, R. R. Beri, and Chief Parliamentary Secretary Prahalad Singh Gillakhera,. The Hooda government rejected the ministry's findings and asked it to re-examine the case, a request which was denied.

In March 2013, the Hooda government accused Chaturvedi of inefficiency and recommended his dismissal. In October 2013, the President Pranab Mukherjee dismissed the charge in October of that year, censuring the government of Haryana. The Hooda government then attempted to downgrade Chaturvedi's appraisal report, which was reversed by the president. Between 2008 and 2014, the president issued four orders supporting Chaturvedi and reversing the Hooda government.

==== Obstruction by Haryana govt against cadre relocation ====
In May 2012, Chaturvedi was selected by the central government as a deputy secretary at All India Institute of Medical Sciences, New Delhi (AIIMS) under the Union Health Ministry. Haryana's Hooda government refused to release him, however, despite repeated requests from the central government's health ministry and the Ministry of Environment and Forests (MoEF). The latter released Chaturvedi on 29 June 2012, despite the Hooda government's objection.

==== Supreme Court case ====
Based on the CVC and CBI reports, the central government asked the Haryana government to issue a notification of the CBI investigation in March 2012; the state government refused to issue the notification. Chaturvedi petitioned the Supreme Court for a CBI investigation, and notices were issued to the central government, the CBI and the Haryana government in November 2012. In an October 2014 Supreme Court affidavit, the CBI expressed its willingness to investigate. In April of that year, the Haryana Bhupinder Singh Hooda petitioned the central government in the Punjab and Haryana High Court to rescind its orders. In April 2017, the investigation had not begun.

The high court fined Chaturvedi ₹50,000 in February 2018 (saying that he had not filed a reply to the petition), but it was set aside by a Supreme Court bench headed by Chief Justice Deepak Misra on 19 February. The central government stated in an affidavit to the high court that month that when All India Services officers work in state governments, their discipline remains with the central government. The high court dismissed Haryana's challenge to the central-government inquiry panel in August 2019 because, according to Article 131 of the Constitution of India, a dispute between the central government and a state must be heard by the Supreme Court; the Haryana case was similar to Chaturvedi's 2012 Supreme Court case.

In June 2018, an official in the secretariat of Haryana's Forest Branch filed a police complaint against the chief minister because documents related to Chaturvedi's case were removed and returned by the chief minister's office. The Haryana government transferred the secretariat official who had filed the complaint. Chaturvedi threatened to petition the high court if no action was taken against those responsible for the disappearance of the documents. It was later reported that despite the Haryana advocate general's opinion that Chaturvedi's high-court case should be withdrawn, the state maintained it for over two years.

==== Sanjeev Tomar death case ====
Sanjeev Tomar, a Haryana forest-range officer, was found dead in December 2009 after the initiation of anti-corruption proceedings against him by Sanjiv Chaturvedi. His father, Rampal Singh Tomar, initially told police that his son had died of natural causes. He later changed his statement, saying that Sanjeev had committed suicide because of harassment by Chaturvedi and a subsequent suspension. According to the Jhajjar superintendent of police, Chaturvedi had nothing to do with Tomar's suicide; he was disturbed by corruption and dowry cases against him. A number of special investigation teams (SIT) cleared Chaturvedi. According to the SIT reports, Tomar committed suicide because of an anti-corruption inquiry and litigation by his wife; he had been living with another woman.

In February 2015, the Punjab and Haryana High Court recommended a new SIT to probe allegations that Tomar committed suicide due to harassment by Chaturvedi; this was based on a petition filed by Rampal Singh Tomar. Chaturvedi challenged the order to form an SIT. His counsel argued that the case had already been investigated by four SITs and reviewed by senior police officers, who found no evidence of harassment. He stated that forming a new SIT would hound an officer who had exposed several scams. The court accepted the petition in April 2015, recalled its order, and dismissed Rampal Singh Tomar's petition.

==== Intelligence Bureau report ====
The Intelligence Bureau (IB) prepared a report about alleged threats and harassment to Chaturvedi. When he sought a copy of the report under the RTI Act, the bureau denied it on the grounds that it was an exempt organization under section 24 of the act. The CIC decision was challenged by the Intelligence Bureau in June 2016 in the Delhi High Court, which had granted a stay and issued notices to Chaturvedi. The hearing was concluded in May 2017, and the judgment was issued in August 2017. The Delhi High Court upheld the CIC orders and dismissed the Intelligence Bureau's petition, paving way for Chaturvedi to access the IB report. The court ruled that under the RTI Act, corruption and human-rights violation are not exempt from disclosure.

== Career in Delhi ==
=== AIIMS Delhi ===
On 29 June 2012, Chaturvedi was made deputy secretary and chief vigilance officer of All India Institute of Medical Sciences, New Delhi. As a CVO, Chaturvedi's cases included counterfeit drugs; financial irregularities in construction projects; corruption in recruitment purchase of medical equipment, doctors making unauthorized foreign trips, contracts with security companies, single-bid tendering, computerization purchases, pension-fund corruption and sexual harassment. During his tenure, police seized banned drugs worth ₹60 million from a vehicle delivering to an on-campus pharmacy owned by an Indian National Congress MLA. Health minister Ghulam Nabi Azad signed two internal reports which called Chaturvedi's CVO work "outstanding". Chaturvedi began about 200 corruption cases as AIIMS CVO; sanctions were imposed in 78 cases, charges were brought in 87, and over 20 were referred to the CBI for criminal investigation. They included cases against senior IAS officer Vineet Chawdhry of the Himachal Pradesh cadre (a previous deputy), Director (Administration) and former deputy director (Administration) Shailesh Yadav, a senior IPS officer, senior faculty members, former Registrar V. P. Gupta and former Chief Administrative Officer Attar Singh.

As a result of Chaturvedi's investigations, the CBI registered cases and recommended action against Vineet Chawdhry. According to a June 2017 India Today investigative report, Union Health Minister J. P. Nadda was found to have suppressed an investigation of what the report called a ₹7,000 crore scam. The India Today reports included reports from the CBI and a parliamentary committee. Opposition parties accused Nadda of links to senior IAS officer Vineet Chawdhry, with whom he had worked in Himachal Pradesh.

The CBI found in October 2015 that AIIMS director M. C. Mishra and other school officials were involved in corruption in the purchase of medical items, and recommended action against them to the health ministry. The bureau presented a January 2018 forgery case under the Prevention of Corruption Act, 1988 against AIIMS officials as a result of Chaturvedi's May 2014 report. In September 2013, the CBI laid a criminal case concerning fraudulent payments and financial irregularities in allocating a security contract. It was found later that Chaturvedi's corruption cases involving senior IAS and IPS officers and the AIIMS' director and senior officials were hushed up after his removal by Nadda's health ministry.

In August 2014, Chaturvedi was relieved as CVO. He wrote in a 16 August letter to incoming health minister Harsh Vardhan of the Bharatiya Janata Party (BJP) that his removal was the result of a campaign by corrupt officials. Chaturvedi was supported by AIIMS staff (who wrote to the prime minister requesting his reinstatement) and the Aam Aadmi Party (AAP), who staged demonstrations. The media and the AAP alleged that the BJP's Nadda removed Chaturvedi on behalf of Vineet Chaudhary, an IAS officer from Himachal Pradesh. Chaturvedi had accused Chaudhary of bending rules to extend tenure to an engineer supervising works worth ₹3,700 crore. Nadda had reportedly proposed removing Chaturvedi in a letter which received 20 signatures within 24 hours. Chaturvedi had accused two security-contractor firms of serious violations, one of which was owned by the BJP's Rajya Sabha MP R. K. Sinha.

Health and family welfare minister Harsh Vardhan said that Chaturvedi was removed because he was ineligible for the CVO post, and the government decision had no male fides. However, the media reported that Nadda had written several letters advocating Chaturvedi's removal and demanded a halt to his corruption cases; a meeting between Nadda and Vardhan for that purpose was documented. Nadda reportedly wrote four letters between May 2013 and June 2014 requesting Chaturvedi's removal, which occurred after a change of government.

Media reports exposed records related to earlier attempts to remove Chaturvedi, despite a May 2014 report from the Union Health Secretary and the Health Ministry CVO that his performance was "exemplary" and his integrity "absolute". After intervention by a parliamentary committee, the prime minister's office directed the cabinet secretary to monitor and report further efforts to remove him.

After Chaturvedi's removal, prime minister Narendra Modi asked Vardhan for a report. Health secretary Lov Verma said that AIIMS did not have an independent CVO, and Chaturvedi had been given additional responsibilities as an "internal arrangement." DNA reported that facts about Chaturvedi's appointment and removal were omitted from Verma's report, and he was made CVO by an AIIMS order.

After Nadda became health minister in November 2014, his ministry attempted to revise Chaturvedi's appraisal report until Nadda was stopped the following June by the Central Administrative Tribunal following a petition by Chaturvedi to promote him to director (selection grade) as scheduled; he was promoted retroactively, from 1 January. In August 2015, the Parliamentary Standing Committee on Health and Family Welfare accused the health ministry of ignoring AIIMS corruption and criticised the replacement of a dedicated CVO post with a ministry CVO. That month, Chaturvedi said that he was disappointed with the Modi government for not acting on the corruption cases.

By December 2015, Chaturvedi was still employed at AIIMS but his assigned tasks had been removed by the central government without explanation. The following July, Chaturvedi filed an affidavit in the Delhi High Court that the ministry had taken no action on his AIIMS corruption cases. After being stripped of his duties during the 2015–2016 fiscal year (a move that challenged in the Supreme Court), Chaturvedi received an "unsatisfactory" performance evaluation.

=== AIIMS support ===
After Chaturvedi was removed, AIIMS faculty members circulated a petition to bring him back; about 250 faculty members and researchers wrote to Prime Minister Modi to reinstate him as CVO and conduct an inquiry into his removal. Chaturvedi also received support from the AIIMS student union and employees.

=== Public interest litigation ===
In February 2015, the Delhi High Court issued notices to the central government and Union Health Minister J. P. Nadda in response to public interest litigation (PIL) filed by Prashant Bhushan demanding a CBI investigation of pending corruption cases and Chaturvedi's removal as CVO. The court had sought a status report from the CBI on corruption exposed by Chaturvedi. In April 2018, the court issued notices to the central government seeking their reply on the improper closure of corruption cases by the health ministry (headed by Nadda) during the PIL.

=== Conflict with central vigilance commissioner ===
Chaturvedi wrote to the president in July 2017 requesting a suspension and Supreme Court inquiry of Central Vigilance Commissioner K. V. Chaudhary under Section 6 of the CVC Act, 2003, citing CBI reports recommending action against AIIMS officials and faculty members on corruption charges which were summarily closed by Chaudhary. Chaturvedi further alleged that the CVC did not exercise his disciplinary authority in closing the cases. In response to Chaturvedi's RTI application about action taken on his complaint to the president about the CVC, the central government's Department of Personnel and Training (DoP&T) said that there were no guidelines to deal with such complaints.

In January 2019, the central government said that guidelines to handle such complaints were being framed and complaint will be processed only after guidelines are framed. This was criticized by the opposition Congress Party, which charged the central government with hiding behind technicalities to justify its inaction against Chaudhary.

=== Zero appraisal ===
Chaturvedi received a zero grading in his annual performance report (APAR) for the 2015-16 fiscal year (the year he received the Ramon Magsaysay Award) from Nadda and his subordinates. His previous appraisals had been outstanding, and in 2014 the health secretary rated his performance as exemplary. The central government had deprived him of work after his petition was accepted by the Supreme Court in September 2016. A March 2017 Intelligence Bureau report called Chaturvedi a "diligent officer". Within four months of Chaturvedi's zero rating, Uttarakhand's BJP government rated him outstanding for the 2016-17 fiscal year. When Chaturvedi appealed his zero rating to the Uttarakhand High Court in June 2017, the court (led by Chief Justice K. M. Joseph) sent the case to a tribunal. The court's order was criticized by the legal fraternity, since it had previously heard service-related cases. The Nainital Central Administrative Tribunal rejected the Cabinet Secretary's request to remove his name from the case related to Chaturvedi's zero appraisal.

The Uttarakhand High Court called the central government's attitude towards Chaturvedi "vindictive" in August 2018, and imposed ₹25,000 in court costs. In February 2019, the Supreme Court of India upheld the Uttarakhand High Court's judgment and fined AIIMS ₹25,000.

In May, 2025, Central Administrative Tribunal, Nainital Circuit Bench, issued contempt notices to Cabinet Secretary T V Somanathan, along with Union Health Secretary and Secretary of Central Vigilance Commission (CVC) on application moved by Chaturvedi in his Zero Appraisal case, on account of their failure to provide him certain documents regarding closure of anti-corruption investigations initiated by him as CVO, AIIMS.

In August, 2025, Cabinet Secretary along with Health Secretary, move a Petition before Nainital High Court for stay of contempt proceedings initiated by Central Administrative Tribunal (CAT) on Application of Chaturvedi.

In September, 2025, Chaturvedi filed a perjury petition against cabinet Secretary alleging, filing of false affidavit by him in Nainital High Court and also sought permission of Court to initiate defamation proceedings against Cabinet Secretary for using disparaging remarks against him in affidavit filed before High Court.

=== Judgements and PMNRF donation ===
In June 2019, the High Court of Uttarakhand issued contempt notices for non-payment of judgements to the Union Health Secretary and AIIMS director. The central government paid Chaturvedi the following month, and in August, he donated it to the Prime Minister's National Relief Fund (PMNRF). In his letter to Prime Minister Narendra Modi, Chaturvedi expressed surprise that public funds could be used for vindictive litigation and asked Modi to create a fund for other honest officers facing harassment and retaliation.

=== Judicial recusals ===
As per report published in ‘Times of India’ in February 2025, with recusal of two new CAT judges, number of judges so far having recused from hearing cases of Chaturvedi, had touched to 13. This is being termed, probably highest number of judicial recusals in case of a single officer. As per the report, the list involves judges from Supreme Court, Nainital High Court, Central Administrative Tribunal and even lower courts. Supreme Court justices Ranjan Gogoi and U. U. Lalit recused themselves from the Haryana Forestry case, and a Shimla Court judge recused himself in April 2018 from a criminal defamation case filed against Chaturvedi by Himachal Pradesh Chief Secretary Vineet Chawdhary. Central Administrative Tribunal chair L. Narasimha Reddy recused himself from all of Chaturvedi's cases in a 29 March 2019 order, citing "unfortunate developments" and calling them "a rare case". Reddy had been cited for contempt by the High Court of Uttarakhand for disobeying their order on a petition filed by Chaturvedi, but his contempt proceeding was stayed by the Supreme Court in March 2019.

In January 2021, Chairman of Central Administrative Tribunal (CAT), Justice L. Narsimha Reddy recused himself from the case filed by Sanjiv Chaturvedi, against the Central Government challenging lateral entry and 360 degree appraisal system introduced for officers at the level of Joint Secretary and above. In February 2021, in the same case, another judge of CAT, Delhi, Justice RN Singh recused himself on the ground that he had earlier appeared as a counsel representing Central Vigilance Commission (CVC) in a case filed by Chaturvedi.

In May 2023, a division bench of Uttarakhand High Court consisting of Chief Justice, recused himself from hearing case of Chaturvedi. The order didn't mention any reason at all.

In another development in March 2023, a division bench of Supreme Court, headed by Justice M.R. Shah, referred the matter of Chaturvedi to a larger bench regarding the issue of deciding the jurisdiction of high courts to hear appeal against orders of Central Administrative Tribunal (CAT). Judgement was reserved on 26 April in year 2022 and pronounced later on 3 March 2023, after a lapse of ten months.

In November 2023, another bench of Central Administrative Tribunal, recused itself from hearing case of Sanjiv Chaturvedi.

In February 2024, Justice Manoj Tiwari of Uttarakhand High Court recused from one of cases of Chaturvedi, without citing any reason. This was the ninth such judicial recusal in his case.

In April 2025, Additional Chief Judicial Magistrate, Nainital, Ms. Neha Kushwaha recused from a Criminal Defamation case filed by him, against one of CAT Judges, citing his earlier family relations with another CAT Judge, Mr. D S Mahara.

In September, 2025, Senior Judge of Uttarakhand High Court, Justice Ravindra Maithani, recused from a contempt case filed by Chaturvedi against two Members of CAT, without citing any reason.

In October, 2025, Another Judge of Uttarakhand High Court, Justice Alok Verma, recused from the same contempt case filed by Chaturvedi against two Members of CAT, again without citing any reason.

This was highest number of Judicial recusals in case of a single officer in Indian Judicial History. A detailed investigative story in ‘Times of India’ published in October, 2025, explored all the recusals and unusual judicial decisions in case of Sanjiv Chaturvedi. This was followed by many such opinion pieces in other publications on propriety of judicial recusals.

In September 2026, another judge- Member (judicial) CAT, Rajveer Singh also recused from hearing case filed by Chaturvedi, against a notification of Uttarakhand Government regarding mode if writing of Appraisal Report of IFS officers.

=== Prime Minister's intervention ===
The Wire cited RTI documents that Prime Minister Narendra Modi had discussed Chaturvedi's removal with Health Minister Harsh Vardhan on 23 August 2014. That day, Union Health Secretary Luv Verma wrote to the Principal Secretary to the Prime Minister that the Prime Minister had phoned the union Health minister and a report to the Prime Minister would follow. Although the content of the conversation was unclear, Chaturvedi was then stripped of his responsibilities, received a zero appraisal and faced several lawsuits. After the phone call, the prime minister's office unsuccessfully sought comments or a report from the health ministry about Chaturvedi's allegations. In 2013, the prime minister's office had intervened to resolve his case concerning differences between the Ministry of Environment and Forest (MoEF) and the Department of Personnel and Training (DoPT). In February 2019, Chaturvedi wrote to Prime Minister Modi asking him to disclose details of Modi's phone conversation with Harsh Vardhan.

=== Campaign against black money ===
In August 2017, Chaturvedi submitted a 16-point RTI application to the prime minister's office for information on funds brought into India by the Modi government and deposited into citizen accounts. During the 2014 parliamentary elections, the BJP promised to deposit ₹15 lakhs of foreign money into the account of every citizen. Chaturvedi also sought information on corruption complaints against Modi government ministers, a copy of the inquiry report and action taken on the complaints by the prime minister. Although the prime minister's office initially refused to provide the information, the Central Information Commission (CIC) ordered the prime minister's office to do so within 15 days on 16 October 2018. In its 12 November response, the prime minister's office said that providing details would be "cumbersome exercise" and "disproportionately divert the resources of the office" under Section 7 (9) of the RTI Act, 2005. The office also refused to provide information about money brought in from abroad, saying that its disclosure would affect a black-money investigation and citing Sections 8(1)(h) and 24 of the RTI Act. The denial by the PMO was questioned by Shiv Sena. and Chaturvedi called the fight against corruption a second freedom struggle, which has been studied in several publications.

In November 2018, Chaturvedi filed a non-compliance complaint against the prime minister's office with the Central Information Commission under Section 18 of the RTI Act. The complaint was heard in April and June 2019; in an 18 June order, the CIC ruled that the prime minister's office was incorrect in its justification. However, it agreed with the PMO that disclosure of the information would impede an ongoing investigation.

In July and September 2019, the Delhi High Court dismissed Chaturvedi's case. A Supreme Court division bench, hearing a special leave petition filed by Chaturvedi against the Delhi High Court rulings, issued a notice to the PMO in January 2020.

In January 2024, in a landmark judgement, involving corruption cases investigated by Chaturvedi. The Delhi High Court ruled that CBI is not exempted under RTI Act in matters of Corruption and human rights violation. Earlier in September 2023, in an unprecedented and bold order, the Delhi High Court issued contempt notices, to two senior CBI officers on petition of Chaturvedi.

In July 2024, Supreme Court agreed to expedite hearing of case of black money brought from abroad, on petition of Chaturvedi.

In an unprecedented affidavit filed before Delhi High Court in April 2024, in second contempt petition of Chaturvedi against it, CBI alleged 'arm twisting' by Chaturvedi.

=== Defamation case against Chaturvedi ===
A defamation case was filed against Chaturvedi by Vineet Chawdhary in a Shimla court concerning Chaturvedi's August 2014 letter to the Himachal Pradesh Chief Secretary, which contained a list of pending departmental and CBI investigations of Chawdhary. Chawdhary was deputy director (administration) at AIIMS New Delhi from 2010 to 2012, and was the subject of a number of complaints about financial irregularities and abuse of power. After the lower court issued a summons, Chaturvedi approached the Shimla High Court to quash the proceedings on the grounds that providing information on pending cases was part of his duties as AIIMS CVO.

In an April 2018 order, the Shimla High Court refused to intervene; the judge hearing the case recused himself for personal reasons. Chaturvedi challenged the defamation case in the Supreme Court, which overturned the Himachal Pradesh High Court ruling the following month and asked it to re-hear the case.

=== Delhi Government invitation ===
In 2015, the Aam Aadmi Party planned to appoint Chaturvedi as chief of the Delhi anti-corruption bureau. On 17 and 28 February 2015, Delhi Chief Minister Arvind Kejriwal wrote to Cabinet Minister of Environment and Forests Prakash Javdekar asking for the deputation of Chaturvedi to Delhi as an officer on special duty. The Ministry of Environment, Forest and Climate Change (MoEFCC) directed the Ministry of Health and Family Welfare to consent to Chaturvedi's deputation to the Delhi government.

In October 2015, the Ministry of Health and Family Welfare gave its consent. This was followed by the government of Uttarakhand, and a court directed the Appointments Committee of the Cabinet (ACC) to make a decision by 1 May 2016. The Uttarakhand government withdrew its consent in January 2016, restoring it shortly afterwards. The court directed the ACC to make a timely decision. In July 2016, ACC rejected Chaturvedi's transfer because he had not completed the requisite cooling-off period between deputations. In a letter to the prime minister that month, Delhi Chief Minister Arvind Kejriwal said that a cooling-off period is not required for personal staff appointments and requested the deputation for the public good.

== Career in Uttarakhand ==
In October 2012, Chaturvedi applied for a change of cadre from Haryana to Uttarakhand on the grounds of extreme hardship, including frequent transfers, a suspension and false cases. The state governments and the Ministry of Environment and Forests also recommended a cadre change in July 2014 to the Appointment Committee of Cabinet (ACC), headed by the prime minister. On 28 January 2015, the ACC ordered fresh NOCs from both state governments. The order was challenged by the Central Administrative Tribunal (CAT), which stayed and then quashed it in May 2015 and gave the ACC two months to approve the cadre change; on 13 August 2015, the cadre change was approved.

=== Uttarakhand forest conservator ===
After completing his four-year tenure at AIIMS New Delhi, Chaturvedi joined the Uttarakhand cadre on 29 August 2016 and was promoted to Conservator of Forest in November of that year. The state government was confused about his posting, and after three months he was ordered to a post as Officer on Special Duty (OSD) of the government of Uttarakhand to supervise state cases in the National Green Tribunal (NGT). The state government cancelled the Delhi posting within 24 hours at a press conference called by Chief Minister Harish Rawat, who said that Chaturvedi would receive a posting of his choice in Uttarakhand. After Chaturvedi requested assignment to the anti-corruption wing, he was appointed Conservator of Forest (Research) on 12 May 2016. The reversal was criticized by state political activists.

=== Research projects ===
Chaturvedi initiated projects on the impact of climate change on rhododendron bloom, changes in the tree line, and carbon sequestration of broad-leaved species. A research study to gather data on aspects of human-wildlife conflict, Uttarakhand's most significant problem, was also initiated. The patenting of two medicinal species was begun. Chaturvedi began a conservation program for fern species, and a project for the conservation and propagation of species in the state's alpine meadows. The state government planned to patent kasani after a Defence Research and Development Organization unit corroborated its medicinal properties with Chaturvedi's research wing. Chaturvedi initiated projects researching 17 tree species which yield dye, tannin and gum. Steps were taken to conserve rare and threatened Himalayan plant species by requiring that at least 10 percent of such species be planted annually statewide.

A project was initiated to conserve wild mushrooms growing in the Devban region. In November 2018, the Uttarakhand government approved Chaturvedi's proposal to conserve Himalayan flora. Tulips were successfully grown in Haldwani.

A conservation project for grass species in the state was initiated, A Palmatum for conservation of various palm species was established in Haldwani. and efforts were made to conserve historically important tree species. A project was begun to conserve 127 orchid species in the Gori Valley, and a rare species of macaque was reported in the state's Pithoragarh region. A study was conducted on the impact of climate change on the Himalayan pika.

The Forest Department began a project to plant chinar trees, otherwise found in Kashmir, in Uttarakhand. In October 2019, another project was initiated to conserve the state's wild fruits and spices. Two months later, a project was begun in Nainital district to establish India's first moss garden and showcase moss species. In March 2020, Jurassic Park was established in Haldwani for Jurassic vegetation, including ginkgo biloba, fern, cycads, mosses, conifers and horsetails. A Buddha Garden was established the following month in Haldwani, showcasing 13 tree species linked to Gautama Buddha (including the ashoka tree under which he was reportedly born, the peepal tree under which he attained enlightenment and the sal tree under which he died). India's first Moss garden was finally inaugurated in November 2020. It is spread over an area of 10 ha and has more than thirty species of Moss and bryophytes.

Chaturvedi released a report in May of that year on 1,145 plant species (endemic and threatened) conserved by Uttarakhand's research wing, including trees, medicinal herbs, orchids, bamboo, ferns, grasses, shrubs, cactus, palm, Alpine flowers, moss, algae and lichens.

For the 2020 World Environment Day on 5 June, Chaturvedi inaugurated Uttarakhand's largest biodiversity park. The 18-acre (7.3 ha) park contains about 500 plant species, including trees, medicinal herbs, cactus, orchids, palm, bamboo and vines. Its approximately 45 different sections include Jurassic Park (showcasing Jurassic vegetation), a soil museum, a weather station, driftwood, pebble art and medicinal-plant extracts. That month, India's first Lichen Park was opened in Munsyari, Pithoragarh district. The 2-acre (0.81 ha) park contains about 80 species of lichen. In July 2020, a Ramayana Garden was opened in Haldwani. The 1-acre (0.40 ha) garden contains forest types and plant species described in Valmiki's Ramayana. Connecting nature and literature, poems about nature by Robert Frost, Sumitranandan Pant, Mirza Ghalib, Gulzar, Tagore and Ruskin Bond are displayed in the state's biodiversity conservation centers.

In December 2020, India's first pollinator park was inaugurated in Haldwani. Spread over an area of 4 acres (1.62 ha), it has 40 different pollinator species.

In January 2021, an arboretum consisting of around 200 species of trees and shrubs, representing biodiversity of Shiwali Hills, which is basically Outer Himalayas was inaugurated. In February 2021, First Forest Healing Centre of India was inaugurated at Ranikhet. Inspired from Japanese system of forest bathing and ancient Indian traditions, it intends to promote activities of tree hugging, forest walking, forest meditation and sky gazing, to augment healing process.

On the eve of World Environment Day in 2021, a comprehensive report of Flora conserved by Research Wing was released. Report contained details of 1576 plant species out of which 73 were threatened and 53 were endemic. It was stated that this report is being released to counter concept of plant blindness.

In June 2021, a unique garden called Bharat Vatika was unveiled, prepared by Research Wing under Sanjiv Chaturvedi and inaugurated by schoolgirls. It contained all the State trees of 28 States and 5 Union Territories of India, brought together at one place for the first time anywhere in country. As per 'Times of India' report, it took massive efforts to collect plants from far away States, from roads, railways and by air.

In July 2021, first Cryptogamic garden of India, was inaugurated, in Dehradun District of Uttarakhand, at an altitude of 9000 ft. Developed by Research Wing, it displays more than 70 species of Cryptogams. In July 2021, first orchid conservation Centre of North India was got inaugurated in Mandal. spread over an area of 3 acres, It has 70 different orchid species. In August, research wing reported a new subspecies of Orchid-Celephenthra erecta, which was a new addition to list of Indian flora. In August 2021, highest altitude herbal garden of India, developed by research wing under Chaturvedi, at an altitude of 11000 ft was got inaugurated. Spread over an area of 3 acres, it has 40 different species, divided into four sections. It is located at Mana, near Indo-China border. In September, biggest open-air fernery of India, was inaugurated at Ranikhet, displaying around 120 different fern species. In the same month, the biggest Palm Garden of North India, displaying around 90 different palm species, was inaugurated in Haldwani. In October, biggest aromatic garden of India, displaying 140 different aromatic species, was inaugurated at Lalkuan. Developed on area of 3 acres, it has 8 different sections and a Tulsi Vatika.

In November, first grass conservatory of India, was got inaugurated in Ranikhet. Spread over an area of 3 acres, it has around 90 different grass species. In December 2021, first biodiversity gallery of Uttarakhand was inaugurated at Haldwani. Its main feature was 101 icons of flora and fauna to display unexplored aspects of Uttarakhand Biodiversity apart from 8 other sections.

In September 2021, a team of research wing of Uttarakhand Forest department discovered a rare carnivorous plant -Utricularia Furcellata, in Mandal valley, which was first reporting of this plant in western Himalaya. The discovery was published in June 2022 issue of prestigious Journal of Japanese Botany.

In August 2022, research wing opened first of its kind Himalayan spice garden in Ranikhet. This garden spread over an area of 4 acres, exclusively showcases more than 30 species of Himalayan region.

The Himalayan Gentian, a critically endangered medicinal plant of Western Himalayas facing extinction, as well as many other threatened species, were conserved by developing nursery techniques for their propagation and preparing sufficient number of their plants in Research centers of research wing.

First gymnosperm garden of India, having around 25 different gymnosperm species was established in Uttarkashi district of Uttarakhand.

An initiative was taken by research wing to plant flowering shrubs and trees native to Himalayan region, along roads in hills of Uttarakhand to provide proper habitat and nectar to various pollinators.

Under the leadership of Chaturvedi, Research wing successfully conserved, a critically endangered plant species (part of IUCN list) in Nainital district of Uttarakhand.

A popular positive developmental news portal The Better India appreciated his efforts in protecting large number of threatened and endangered plant species, of Himalayan region in an article published in May 2024.

First of its kind Rhododendron Garden was opened in high altitude area of Munsyari in July 2024. Spread over an area of one hectare, it has around 35 different Rhododendron species.

As per report published in 'The New Indian Express' in March 2025, Research Wing has launched a specific programme for cultivating native plant species favored by birds for feeding, for hilly regions of Uttarakhand.

A Bird gallery, at Dehradun, depicting high resolution images of rich bird diversity of Uttarakhand and first such one in Uttarakhand was opened in July 2024.

The Research Wing of Uttarakhand Forest Department stablished 42 field based ‘ecological laboratories’ across Uttarakand to monitor long term ecological changes and impact of climate change on the forests of Uttarakhand

In October 2024, Research Wing of Uttarakhand Forest Department claimed to develop highest altitude Miyawaki forest of world at 8000 ft in Munsyari area of Pithoragarh district. This Miyawaki forest is reported to have many endemic and threatened species of plants like Takeel Palm, Himalayan Yew and species of berberis

Uttarakhand Forest Department became first in country in deploying artificial intelligence for preparing working plan, for forests of Uttarakhand on areas of bio-diversity conservation, impact of climate change on vegetation and sustainable forest management. First use of AI tool was made in preparing working plan of Garhwal forest division.

Research Wing developed first butterfly gallery of Uttarakhand at Dehradun, which showcases more than 100 different types of butterfly species apart from displaying interesting information about migration of monarch butterflies, mud puddling behavior and life cycle of butterflies

In July, 2025, Research wing of Uttarakhand Forest Department, embarked on an ambitious project of rehabilitation of 14 endangered and threatened plant species to their natural habitat, which was first of its kind in India.

In September, 2025, Research Wing of Uttarakhand Forest Department for the first time, published list of more than 160 sacred natural sites which included sacred groves, sacred forests as well as sacred water bodies and meadows, located at high altitudes in Himalaya.

In September, 2025, Research wing of Uttarakhand Forest Department announced a program for celebrating festival of flowering of Rhododendron and Himalayan Cherry, in months of March and October every year on the lines of Cherry festival of Japan.

26 innovative conservation centers developed across the State of Uttarakhand, many of which being the first of their kind in India and even the World, ranging from Munsyari Lichen Garden, Nainital Moss Garden, to Ranikhet forest healing center and Chakarata Cryptogamic Garden, were widely appreciated across the State as well as on National and International level.

=== As Director, UFTA ===
After transfer from Research wing and availing leave, Sanjiv Chaturvedi joined in January, 2026 as Director, Uttarakhand Forest Training Academy, where he created many new infrastructural and learning facilities for frontline field staff trainees, including state of art nursery, having equipments like latest mist chambers, hydroponics and expanded sports facilities by constructing clay tennis court, indoor game center and also opened a modern cafeteria. He also initiated case study based modules for trainees and introduced special modules on current ecological issues.

In July 2026, first Geographical Indicator(GI) gallery was opened, in UFTA, to showcase more than 30 GI products of Uttarakhand, which included many agricultural and handicraft items, typical to Uttarakhand.

In September, 2026, as part of outreach to Gen Z and to promote ecological education in state, UFTA announced free stay for students in it's hostels, undertaking ecological study.

In October 2026, UFTA announced an ambitious program of training of frontline forest staff in Israeli self defense technique- Krav Maga. The decision came in wake of analysis of record of casualty of around 60 field staff on duty -due to attack by poachers, wildlife and forest fire.

=== Champawat forest scam ===
In September 2017, Chaturvedi was ordered by the Uttarakhand government to investigate irregularities in the Champawat Forest Division. He discovered the illegal cutting of pine trees, and a resin scam in which money earmarked for resin collection was diverted. After Chaturvedi's investigation, the state government planned to charge divisional forest officer A. K. Gupta. In February 2020, Gupta was suspended.

=== Munsyari Eco hut Scam ===
In July, 2025, Uttarakhand Government initiated action against an IFS officer, on basis of a detailed investigation report running into more than 500 pages submitted by Chaturvedi in December, 2024 and January, 2025, regarding massive financial irregularities and violation of forest laws into construction of Eco Huts at Munsyari. Later, in August, 2025, Central Government also, on the basis of report sent by Chaturvedi, took tough stand in the matter and asked Uttarakhand Government to appoint an officer for prosecution of guilty officers in violation of forest laws.

=== Missing boundary pillars of Mussoorie ===
In June and August, 2025, Chaturvedi submitted a detailed investigation report about 7375 number of missing boundary pillars, in Mussoorie Forest Division and asked for an impartial investigation by SIT or through CBI and ED, in view of deep nexus of local officers with politicians. As per his report, most of pillars were in Mussoorie and Raipur Ranges, which were always eyed by hoteliers and real estate developers. On his report, again Central Government, in August, 2025, asked Uttarakhand Government to take actions against violators of forest laws.

In December 2025, Uttarakhand High Court, in an important order, issued notices to Central Government, Uttarakhand Government and CBI, for filing reply and expressed surprise about rapid rise in wealth of Forest Officials so quickly.

=== Miyawaki Cost over run ===
In June, 2025, Chaturvedi flagged issue of over costing and financial irregularities in Miyawaki plantation project in Dehradun. As per his report, in the same District, he had raised the same Miyawaki plantation with much less cost per hectare and per plant in year 2019-2023, which led to an enquiry by State forest Minister.

=== Arbitrator ===
In January 2018, the Chandigarh Housing Board appointed Chaturvedi arbitrator of a construction dispute. In March 2019, he donated his fee to a welfare fund for families of CRPF personnel killed in the Pulwama attack the previous month.

=== Corbett Tiger Reserve director ===
Chaturvedi was director of the Jim Corbett Tiger Reserve in May and June 2019. During his tenure, he conducted a study indicating that tigers killed about 13 elephants monthly for a five-year period; nine tigers and five leopards were also killed. An order was issued banning VIP treatment and safaris for executive and judiciary officials. A crackdown was launched on fake websites using the reserve's name, and closure notices were issued to about fifteen websites for legal violations. An order was passed to facilitate booking for ordinary tourists. A new zone was proposed for tourists, including portions of the Ram Ganga river in the reserve. A proposal was made for the use of tourism revenue from tiger reserve for local people (as ordered in guidelines issued by National Tiger Conservation Authority) and shared access for nearby hotels and resorts. A fossil museum was proposed after the discovery of a two-million-year-old elephant fossil in the reserve. In November 2021, Sanjiv Chaturvedi was appointed as Enquiry officer to enquire into charges of large scale violations of forest and wildlife laws and charges of illicit felling into construction works in Corbett Tiger Reserve. However, he withdrew himself from Enquiry subsequently citing 'contradictory statements of senior state government functionaries over his appointment and asked that in future he may be appointed to enquire into any corruption case only if State Government and Department have real intentions to actually punish the real culprits.

=== Issues with election commissioner ===
In December 2019, election commissioner Ashok Lavasa wrote an op-ed article in an English-language newspaper on the difficulty of being honest. In response to the article, Chaturvedi wrote a lengthy rebuttal citing Lavasa's handling of his deputation to the Delhi government. Citing court orders passed against the handling of his case by Lavasa, Chaturvedi called his article a "complete travesty". In a February 2020 story, the Huffington Post cited Lavasa's handling of Chaturvedi's case in attempts by the central government to prevent his transfer to the Delhi government.

=== Challenge to system of lateral entry and 360 degree appraisal ===
In August 2020, Nainital Bench of CAT, issued notices on petition of Chaturvedi, challenging lateral entry of private sector experts, at the level of Joint Secretary in Central Government and system of 360 degree appraisal. An investigative report by ‘India Today’, showed that there were serious objections raised by officials of Department of Personnel and Training on various anomalies in selection of these experts. In December 2020, on petition of central government, hearing of case was transferred, by Chairman of CAT, to Delhi Bench. Chaturvedi challenged this order before Uttarakhand High Court, which gave judgment in favor of Chaturvedi, in October 2021 setting aside orders of CAT, Chairman.

However, orders of High Court were again challenged by Central Government before Supreme Court, which reserved orders in April 2022 Finally in March 2023, a division bench of Supreme Court, headed by Justice M.R Shah, referred the matter to a larger bench

In a significant development, in October 2023, in a petition filed by Chaturvedi challenging his non-empanelment at the level of Joint Secretary, by Central Government, without disclosing any reason, Department of Personnel and Training, in its affidavit before CAT, Nainital Bench, asserted that there exists no system of 360 degree appraisal. This was viewed to be very surprising.

In a significant ruling in September 2024, Uttarakhand High Court, hearing a petition of Chaturvedi, ordered Central Government to disclose him all the documents related to his appraisal of non-empanelment by Central Government. After non compliance by Central Government, Chaturvedi filed a contempt petition against Vivek Joshi, the then Secretary, DoP&T, in October 2024, on which Uttarakhand High Court issued contempt notices to Vivek Joshi.

A report by ‘Indian Express’ in January 2025, tried to cover the timeline of entire legal journey of this challenge, running from CAT to Supreme Court.

In December 2025, Department of Personnel and Training (DoP&T), filed an affidavit before Central Administrative Tribunal (CAT), in another empanelment case of Sanjiv Chaturvedi, in which it requested that Tribunal’s earlier directions passed in May 2025, regarding disclosure of 360-degree appraisal should be withdrawn. This was a complete change from stand taken by DoP&T in October, 2023 before the Tribunal, as per which there was ‘no such system’ of 360-degree appraisal for empanelment, in the Central Government.

=== In Person Appearances ===
In September 2021 a division bench of Uttarakhand High Court led by Chief Justice, in a detailed order, allowed Sanjiv Chaturvedi to argue his case in person. In the order, High Court appreciated his ‘legal knowledge’, ‘critical analysis of law’, and ‘erudite arguments’ and said that court has reached to the conclusion that both on facts as well as law points, he is in a position to argue his own case in person.

Later on, in October 2021, Sanjiv Chaturvedi won main case, arguing against Central Government regarding issue concerned to his service matter.

=== Transparency in Judiciary ===
State Information Commission of Uttarakhand in a landmark order passed on January, 1st, on an Appeal filed by Sanjiv Chaturvedi in May, 2025, ordered Uttarakhand High Court to disclose the information regarding pending complaints of corruption and misconduct against subordinate judges for a period from January, 2020 to April, 2025, along with number of cases in which action was initiated against such erring judges. Public Information Officer of Uttarakhand High Court had denied the information saying that this was confidential and involved third parties. Rejecting this ground, Chief Information Commissioner of Uttarakhand directed Uttarakhand High Court to disclose the information. This was a very significant order for transparency in judicial administration, as earlier Delhi High Court, Chennai High Court and Chhattisgarh High Courts had declined similar information.

After the direction of State Information Commissioner, Uttarakhand High Court disclosed the data, in February 2026, as per which in the period between January, 2020 and April, 2025, around 258 complaints were received out of which action was initiated only in four cases.

=== Implementation for Whistleblowers Protection Act ===
In October 2026,in a major step for systematic reform ,Sanjiv Chaturvedi moved Supreme Court for operationalization of Whistleblowers Protection Act, 2014, which was passed in May 2014 but was not being implemented by Central Government on grounds of need for amendments on disclosure of issues related to national security. He also sought issuance of guidelines by Supreme Court under it's special powers in case Central Govt drags its feet further. The plea was raised by way of additional affidavit in his 14 year old petition for CBI investigation into Haryana Forestry scam. In this affidavit, Chaturvedi underlined his harassment in form of 12 transfers in 5 years in Haryana, number of frivolous police cases, departmental chargesheets and downgrading of Appraisal reports, after exposing various cases of corruption and forest and wildlife violations.

=== Deputation in Lokpal ===
Sanjiv Chaturvedi had applied for deputation to post of joint secretary in Lokpal in year 2019 which was forwarded by Govt of Uttarakhand to Central Govt. However, Central Govt, did not forward it to Lokpal on the ground that there was not any vacancy circular. In September, 2022, on plea of Chaturvedi, CAT directed Central Govt to decide the issue of forwarding of his deputation request to Lokpal within eight weeks .However ,Central Govt again turned it down on same ground by orders passed in October 2022. In February, 2023, CAT issued contempt notices to then Secretary, MoEF&CC Ms Leena Nandan. Meanwhile, in June 2026, Uttarakhand Govt issued fresh NOC to Sanjiv Chaturvedi in response to vacancy circular published by Lokpal for a post of Joint Secretary. However, as per report published in TOI in November, 2026, Appointment Committee of Cabinet, appointed a Central Civil Services officer, to the post, on its own, after relaxing of cooling off rules in his favor. Strangely Lokpal itself withdrew vacancy circular in August 2026, citing administrative reasons, though as per 2013 Act, it had all the power to appoint its staff.

== Awards and recognition ==
- Manjunath Shanmugam Integrity Award (2009), for his work in Haryana
- S. R. Jindal Prize (2011) for his "crusade against corruption"
- Ramon Magsaysay Award for leadership (2015): for "his exemplary integrity, courage and tenacity in uncompromisingly exposing and painstakingly investigating corruption in public office, and his resolute crafting of program and system improvements to ensure that government honorably serves the people of India."

=== Philanthropy ===
Chaturvedi donated his Magsaysay Award to the AIIMS for treatment of poor patients. AIIMS returned his check in November 2015, and he wrote another check to the Prime Minister's National Relief Fund (PMNRF) with a letter to Prime Minister Narendra Modi accusing J. P. Nadda of bias against him. The Prime Minister's Office initially rejected the donation, saying that it could not accept donations with conditions, but accepted it after Chaturvedi clarified that he had not imposed any conditions.

Sanjiv Chaturvedi, apart from donating Raman Magsaysay Award money in 2015, also donated 9 years of various tour allowances, which were due to him, on account of various tours made to remote parts of Uttarakhand for his various conservation projects and which amounted to more than Rs. 3 Lac, in April, 2026. Earlier in year 2015 also he had donated amount of Rs. 2.5 Lac, granted in Anticorruption award to a needy family. Before that, in February, 2019, he had donated his Arbitration fee, due from Chandigarh Housing Board, amounting around Rs. 2.4 Lac, to a special fund created by Ministry of Home Affairs (MHA), for the help of families of victims of Pulwama terror attack. In August, 2019, he had donated amount of Rs. 25 K, awarded by High Court of Uttarakhand, in a successful litigation against Central Government.

=== As a Role Model ===
Chaturvedi has been invited by the Sardar Vallabhbhai Patel National Police Academy in Hyderabad, Lal Bahadur Shastri National Academy of Administrative in Mussoorie, and Indira Gandhi National Forest Academy in Dehradun to lecture senior officers and probationers on anti-corruption strategies.

Cases about the career of Sanjiv Chaturvedi in Haryana, Delhi, and Uttarakhand have been included in the syllabi for UPSC Civil Services Exam, GS Paper IV (Ethics, Integrity & Aptitude). These cases focus on themes related to public administration ethics, whistleblowing, and administrative integrity.

== See also ==
- Vijay Shankar Pandey, whistle blower IAS
- Anil Swarup, IAS
- Ashok Khemka, whistle blower IAS from Haryana cadre
