= Gurugram Rajiv Gandhi Trust land grab case =

Indian political case

Gurugram Rajiv Gandhi Trust land case
- Court: Supreme Court of India

Case history
- Subsequent action: CBI inquiry

Keywords
- Political scams in India

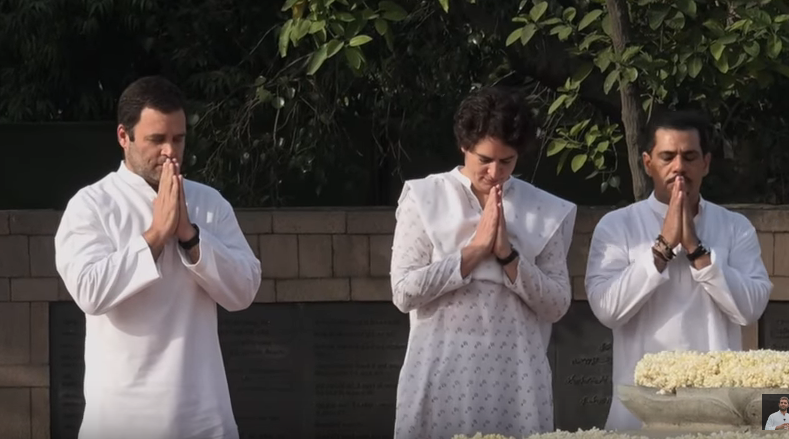
Robert Vadra, extreme right

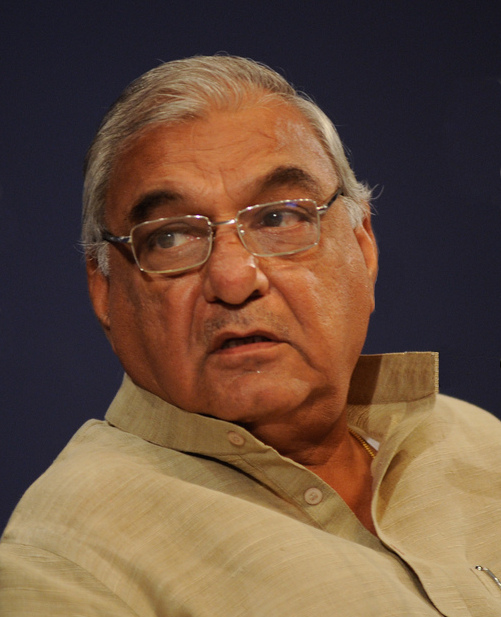
Bhupinder Singh Hooda in 2010

Gurugram Rajiv Gandhi Trust land grab case against Robert Vadra and Bhupinder Singh Hooda is being investigated by the Central Bureau of Investigation (CBI) as per Supreme Court of India's order. In the Gurugram Rajiv Gandhi Trust land grab scam between 2004 and 2014, then Government of Haryana administration of Indian National Congress's Chief Minister Bhupinder Singh Hooda, had handed over panchayat land to the Rajiv Gandhi Charitable Trust in the name of public interest use, resulting in this trust being sued by the gram panchayat in Punjab and Haryana High Court against the land grabbing of the Gandhi family by the Hooda government. Then Chief Minister Bhupinder Singh Hooda. who also held the charge of Panchayat department at that time, had approved the grant of 5.3 acre panchayat land to Rajiv Gandhi Trust for 33 years at a rate of Rs 3 lakh per acre in January 2010, trust applied for the change of land use on 3 December 2010, which was approved on the same day.

== Details ==
=== Modus of scam ===
After Comptroller and Auditor General of India (CAG) in 2013 had blamed the Hooda government for flouting the rules to lease Ulhawas gram panchayat land to Rajiv Gandhi the trust in violation of rules, the Punjab and Haryana High Court had questioned Hood government for not handing case over to CBI. Hooda government in turn challenged the High Court decision of CBI inquiry in the Supreme Court. Supreme Court asked Haryana's new government of Chief Minister Manohar Lal Khattar to hand over the case to CBI for inquiry. Subsequently, Haryana government handed this case over to CBI. New government of Haryana, has also initiated the process to recover this land from the trust.

=== Current status: CBI inquiry ===
High court and Supreme court had asked for the CBI inquiry in this case. The case is currently being probed by CBI under the direction of Supreme Court, and CBI has filed a chargesheet. This case is related to the larger Gurugram-Manesar IMT land scam case.

== See also ==
- Arvind Mayaram
- Corruption in India
- National Herald scam
- Rajiv Gandhi Charitable Trust land grab cases
- Robert Vadra land grab cases
- List of scams in India
