= HSDC (disambiguation) =

HSDC, or Hubbard Street Dance Chicago, is a dance company based in Chicago, Illinois.

It may also refer to:

- Havant and South Downs College, a college in Hampshire, United Kingdom
- Haryana Seeds Development Corporation, an Indian government-based seed production company
