= Garhi Sampla Uddar Gagan land case =

Garhi Sampla Uddar Gagan land scam
- Court: Supreme Court of India
- Full case name: Rohtak-Garhi Sampla Uddar Gagan Model Township land grab scam case
- Decided: 13 May 2016

Case history
- Subsequent action: CBI inquiry

Keywords
- Political scams in India

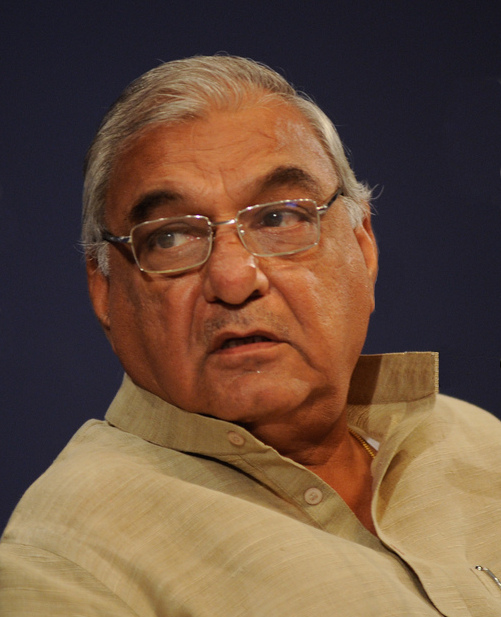
Bhupinder Singh Hooda in 2010

The Rohtak-Garhi Sampla Uddar Gagan Model Township land grab case pertains to illegal acquisition and licensing of 850.88 acres land under Bhupinder Singh Hooda's rule as the Chief Minister of Haryana. Hooda acquired land from illiterate poor farmers at a throwaway prices in the name of "public interest" and later licensed this land to builders by granting them out-of-turn favors, which resulted in exponential increase in the land value, causing gains to big builders. HUDA issued notification on 11 April 2002 for acquiring 850.88 acres land for residential and commercial development in Sector 27-28 of Rohtak However, which was later reduced to acquire 441.11 acre on 8 April 2003. A private builder, Uddar Gagan Properties Limited, was granted license by Hooda' government to develop a colony across 280 acres of the released land [excluded from government acquisition], thus accruing illegal gains to private middlemen. HUDA issued notification on 11 April 2002 for acquiring 850.88 acres land for residential and commercial development in Sector 27-28 of Rohtak However, which was later reduced to acquire 441.11 acre on 8 April 2003. A private builder, Uddar Gagan Properties Limited, was granted license by Hooda' government to develop a colony across 280 acres of the released land [excluded from government acquisition], thus accruing illegal gains to private middlemen. Uddar Gagan is owned by Zee.

Central Bureau of Investigation (CBI) inquiry against Hooda and others is currently underway. Earlier, Punjab and Haryana High Court in March 2013 and the Supreme Court of India in May 2016 had already cancelled the government's decision to release land to the private colonizer.

== Details ==
=== Modus of scam ===
Builders coerce farmers to sell their land by getting the government to use the Section 4 of the land law to have a government notification issued to the farmer that their land is required for the "public purpose". Builders try to acquire this land by offering a small premium above the government's rate for the acquisition of the land. If landowners farmers still resist the sale, then Section 6 of land law is applied by declaring the government's intention to acquire land, which forces the reluctant farmers to sell the land to builders at small premium. Once the land is acquired by the builders, government cancels the acquisition process and releases the land to new build owners, along with the change in land use permission to build residential and industrial building on the farm land. This results in steep rise in the land prices, resulting in massive gains for the builders, opportunity cost loss to the farmers and land tax revenue loss to the government.

Haryana Urban Development Authority (HUDA), now known as Haryana Shahari Vikas Pradhikaran, notified acquisition of 850 acres in 2002, but it acquired only 441 acres April 2003, and remaining land was released to private builders for developing a colony. 280 acres in Rohtak Garhi Sampla was released from acquisition in the same way as it was done in Gurugram-Manesar IMT land scam Manesar during Hooda's administration. On 2 March 2015, builder Uddar Gagan Properties Limited acquired 280 acre land of farmers-owners at throwaway prices under the threat of acquisition at even lower prices. Uddar Gagan in the same month applied to the Haryana Town and Country Planning Department for grant of licence to develop a colony, which was granted in July 2016 and the land was released from the government acquisition process, and instead of returning to the farmers it was released to the builder based on execution of sale deeds favouring the builder through power of attorney.<.

"The officers of the state government, in their anxiety to help out builders, have completely overlooked the interest of landowners or of the general public to whom thousands of plots could have been allotted at a fairly low price through the aegis of HUDA"

— Punjab and Haryana High Court,

=== High court and Supreme court cases ===
Punjab and Haryana High Court in March 2013 gave relief to farmers landowners by quashing the government's decision to release and license the land to private colonizers. This decision to quash the "illegal and deceptive" actions of Hooda administration were reconfirmed by the Supreme Court of India in May 2016. Two senior officers in the office of CM Hooda were indicted for allegedly favouring the developers. Supreme court ordered that the money paid by builders, such as Uddar Gagan, to land owners will not be returned. Money paid by builders to government, land owners and spent on land development will be repaid by the government. People who had bought the developed properties from the builders will either receive the property or the refund. Government/HUDA will own the land.

"Here is a case where artificial reasons were created, the records were fudged with the aid of the Deputy Commissioner, Rohtak, to mislead the fact that the possession of acquired land was not taken while announcing the Award. The responsible officers of the State Government, in their anxiety to help out Uddar Gaggan, have completely overlooked the interest of landowners or of the General Public to whom thousands of plots could have been allotted at a fairly low price through the aegis of HUDA. This amounts to transfer of resources of poor for the benefit of the rich. It amounts to permitting profiteering at the cost of livelihood and existence of a farmer. This is against the philosophy of the Constitution and in violation of guaranteed fundamental rights of equality and right to property and to life. What cannot be done directly cannot be done indirectly also. Undoing of such illegal actions would clearly be in the interests of justice. The wrong has to be remedied. The unholy nexus to promote the private interests of builders by transfer of resources of poor for the benefit of the rich, through gross abuse of law and clear fraud ... State Government may enquire into the legality and bona fides of the action of the persons responsible for illegally entertaining the applications of the builder and releasing the land to it."

— Supreme Court of India, 13 May 2016,

=== Current status: CBI inquiry ===
Subsequently, in March 2018 the Chief Minister Manohar Lal Khattar BJP's Government of Haryana referred the case to CBI to conduct further investigation against Hooda and others. Supreme Court had also ordered Haryana Government to take action on the Dhingra Commission's report, set up to investigate grant of land licences, so that "pending issues could be cracked".

== See also ==
- Corruption in India
- National Herald scam
- Rajiv Gandhi Charitable Trust land grab cases
- Robert Vadra land grab cases
- List of scams in India
