= Haryana Forestry case =

Multi-crore fake plantation scam

Haryana Forestry scam case
- Court: Supreme Court of India
- Full case name: Haryana Forestry scam case

Case history
- Subsequent action: CBI inquiry

Keywords
- Political scams in India

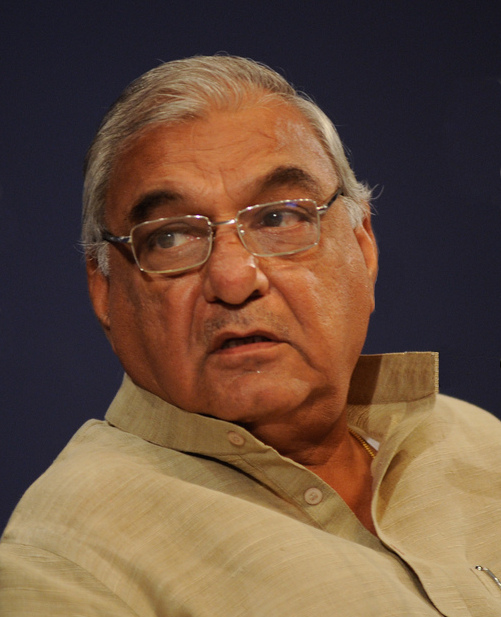
Bhupinder Singh Hooda in 2010

Haryana Forestry scam case is a multi-crore fake plantation scam allegedly involving Bhupinder Singh Hooda, Kiran Chaudhary and others where government money was embezzled. In 2009, this scam was exposed by the whistleblower, Sanjiv Chaturvedi, Ramon Magsaysay Award-winner Indian Forest Service officer with then Government of Haryana, who filed a case in September 2012 to seek Supreme Court's instructions to CBI to investigate the case. Earlier, Haryana Government had suspended him in 2007 for acting against illegal felling of trees and poaching in Saraswati Wildlife Sanctuary, but his suspension was revoked by the President in 2008 and the chargesheet was overturned in 2011 on an appeal against the decision of Haryana government. An inquiry committee of the Ministry of Environment & Forest (MoEF) found Chaturvedi's allegations against Haryana government true, preferred an inquiry by Central Vigilance Commission and by CBI into dubious role of certain highly placed politicians and civil servants. CBI, in its reply to CVC, found Chaturvedi's allegations against then Haryana Government creditable enough for an independent inquiry. As per the rules, CBI can not undertake suo motu investigation, only state government, high court or supreme court can ask CBI for it.

== Details ==
=== Modus of scam ===
While posted at Fatehbad, the Forests officer Sanjiv Chaturvedi accused the Congress MLA Prahlad Singh Gillakhera of corruption in a herbal park establishment project. He alleged that Gillakhera's relatives were buying rare trees for their personal gardens with the taxpayers' money.

Soon after his suspension, the Haryana Forest Department had started prosecution against the contractors, based on earlier reports filed by him. However, after the NGO Ekta Parishad moved against the accused in the Supreme Court in April 2008, the Hooda Government protected the violators.

"The matter was examined and the commission sought the opinion of the CBI on the same. The CBI has now confirmed that the issues raised by Sanjiv Chaturvedi are worthy of an independent probe. The CBI can take up the probe of such matters when notifications are issued u/ s 5& 6 of DSPE Act, 1946 by both the central and state governments"

— Lila Chandran, Deputy Secretary of Central Vigilance Commission

Haryana government rejected MoEF's request in 2012 to initiate a CBI inquiry against the forestry scam. Instead Haryana Government issued another charge sheet against Chaturvedi in August 2012, which too was overturned by the President of India. Haryana administration filed a counter case in the High Court to seek cancellation of the presidential order favoring Chaturvedi and also against the formation of MoEF's earlier inquiry committee on this scam on the basis of ultra vires (beyond the powers of President and MoEF). Chaturvedi filed a case in the Supreme Court in September 2012 asking for the CBI inquiry against this scam, where it is still pending (c. March 2018).

Whistle blower, Sanjiv Chaturvedi, harassed by the then UPA administration in several ways, which forced him to move the Uttarakhand High Court, and involve Prime Minister's office.

=== Current status: Supreme Court ===
The case is currently in the Supreme Court.

== See also ==
- Corruption in India
- National Herald scam
- Rajiv Gandhi Charitable Trust land grab cases
- Robert Vadra land grab cases
- List of scams in India
