= Bikaner Land Deal Scam =

Indian land scam case

The Bikaner land scam involves allegations that Congress leader Priyanka Gandhi's husband Robert Vadra.

Here it has been alleged that Vadra's company, Sky Light Hospitality, illegally purchased and sold 275 bighas of land in the Kolayat area of Bikaner, Rajasthan in January 2010. At that time, Rajasthan was under Congress rule with Ashok Gehlot as its Chief Minister. The transactions allegedly involved forgery, undervalued purchases, and illegal profits.

It has been alleged that Sky Light Hospitality sold this land measuring 31.61 hectares and 37.94 hectares to M/s. Allegeny Finlease Private Limited for around Rs. 2.8 crores. Later, in August 2014, the Colonization Commissioner of Rajasthan informed the Collector of Bikaner regarding certain forged pattas related with the above deal.

Four FIRs were registered in 2014 at Police Station, Gajner, Tehsil Kolayat, Bikaner, for the offences under Sections 420, 467, 468, 471 & 120-B of the Indian Penal Code (IPC) in this matter, in which Charge sheets were filed by Rajasthan Police in August 2015.

Enforcement Directorate registered Enforcement Case Information Report (ECIR) on 17 September 2015. It issued notices to Sky Light Hospitality and questioned the company's authorised representative, Mahesh Nagar, for suspected irregularities.

In 2017, the ED arrested a close associate of Nagar (who worked with Skylight Hospitality) for alleged involvement for using forged power of attorneys. Later Robert Vadra and his mother, Maureen Vadra, appeared before the ED in February 2019 Jaipur for questioning.

Thereafter, ED attached properties and assets worth ₹4.62 crore linked to Vadra's company and associates, claiming that Sky Light Hospitality illegally generated a profit of ₹4.43 crore from this land.

Vadra's firm went to Rajasthan High Court seeking to quash the case, but on 22 December 2022, the Rajasthan High Court dismmised the petition allowing the ED investigation to proceed.
