= Police Line Area, Hisar =

Police Line Area
- Suburb
- Nickname: PLA
- Location within Haryana Location within India
- Coordinates: 29.14132°N 75.727301°E
- Country: India
- State: Haryana
- City: Hisar
- Division: Hisar
- Land acquisition by HUDA: 1998
- Founder: Haryana Urban Development Authority
- Named for: Haryana Police
- Streets: Hisar Sadar

Government
  - Body: Municipal Corporation of Hisar
- Time zone: UTC+5:30 (IST)
- PIN: 125001
- Planning agency: Haryana Urban Development Authority

Police Line Area, also known as PLA, is a residential and commercial suburb located in Hisar city of Haryana, India. The planning of the area is administered by Haryana Urban Development Authority (HUDA).

== History ==
Before 1998, PLA served as the residence for the officials and police training academy of Hisar branch of Haryana Police. In 1998, the residential quarters were shifted to New Police Line and the area was transferred to Haryana Urban Development Authority.

== Location ==
PLA lies on National Highway 9. On its south-eastern side lies Central Jail and on the north-eastern side lies Flamingo Tourist Complex. Kaimri village lies on its south-western side and Jawahar Nagar lies on its north-western side. It is part of Municipal Corporation of Hisar, Hisar (Vidhan Sabha constituency) and Hisar (Lok Sabha constituency).

== Facilities ==
Plots have been allotted by HUDA for construction of houses in the area. A shopping complex has also been constructed for shopping and other commercial activities. Gymkhana club has been developed for recreational activities and a community centre has been developed for community activities. Adjacent to the Gymkhana Club is Town Park. It was constructed over the shooting range of police training academy. It is spread over an area of 12 acres and was opened for public in 2000. It has an artificial waterfall and a musical fountain.

== See also ==
- List of suburbs of Hisar city
- Amardeep colony
- Defence colony, Hisar
- Old Courts Commercial Complex, Hisar
