= Old Courts Commercial Complex, Hisar =

Old Court Commercial Complex
- Suburb
- Interactive map of Old Court Commercial Complex
- Coordinates: 29.147092°N 75.721357°E
- Country: India
- State: Haryana
- City: Hisar
- Land acquisition by HUDA: 1998
- Time zone: UTC+5:30 (IST)
- PIN: 125001
- Planning agency: Haryana Urban Development Authority

Old Court Commercial Complex is a commercial suburb located in Hisar city and Hisar Vidhan Sabha constituency of Haryana, India. The planning of this area is administered by Haryana Urban Development Authority (HUDA).

== History ==
The building of the district court of Hisar was established here in 1832. Lala Lajpat Rai practised as a lawyer in here from 1886 to 1892. It served as the district court till 1973 when the court was shifted to the new Judiciary Complex adjoining the District Administrative Complex of Hisar. The area was left abandoned till 1998 when it was transferred to HUDA for redevelopment.

== Location ==
The complex lies at the junction of National Highway 9 and National Highway 52. Adjacent to the complex lies Krantiman Park, the oldest park of Hisar. It is part of Municipal Corporation of Hisar, Hisar (Vidhan Sabha constituency) and Hisar (Lok Sabha constituency).

== Redevelopment ==
The redevelopment of the area as a commercial complex was started in 1998 by HUDA. A shopping complex was built in the area by HUDA and plots were allotted for commercial activities. The area is now a hub of coaching institutes of the city. The office of the Bhaichara Taxi Union of Hisar is also located here.

== See also ==
- List of suburbs of Hisar city
- Amardeep colony
- Defence colony, Hisar
- Police Line Area, Hisar
