= Civil Lines, Moradabad =

Neighbourhood in Uttar Pradesh, India

Civil Lines
- Neighbourhood
- Country: India
- State: Uttar Pradesh
- District: Moradabad
- City: Moradabad

Government
  - Type: Mayor Council
  - Body: Municipal Corporation of Moradabad

Languages
- Time zone: UTC+5:30 (IST)
- PIN: 244001
- Vehicle registration: UP 21

Civil Lines is a residential neighbourhood in Moradabad, India. It is one of the various Civil Lines neighbourhoods developed by the British Raj for the senior officers in British India. The Moradabad Club is also situated in this neighbourhood. Though a residential neighbourhood, commercial buildings can also be seen in the area. Moradabad's first shopping mall Crossroads Mall also came up in this neighbourhood in 2006. The area also has numerous schools, hospitals and shopping areas. The income tax department building is also located in the neighbourhood.

== Educational institutions ==
- St Mary's Senior Secondary School
- Wilsonia School
- KCM School
- RN Inter College
- Bonne Anne Public School
- P.M.S. Public School

== Hospitals ==
- District Hospital
- Railway Hospital
- District Eye Hospital

== Recreation and entertainment ==
- Moradabad Club
- Crossroads Mall
- Ambedkar Park

== Notable residents ==
- Ponty Chadha, Ex Chairman of Wave Group
- Robert Vadra, businessman and son-in-law of Sonia Gandhi
