= Rajni Sekhri Sibal =

Indian retired government officer

Rajni Sekhri Sibal is a retired Indian Administrative Service government officer of the Haryana cadre, from the 1986 batch. Currently, she serves as the Independent External Monitor (IEM) of the Security Exchange Board of India (SEBI) and EXIM (Export-Import) Bank.

== Career ==
In 1986, she became the fifth woman to stand first in the UPSC Civil Services Exam (Indian Civil Services). During her service tenure, she has held various roles in the Government of India and the Government of Haryana.

In 2017, she was named the Director General, of Employment and Training under the Ministry of Labour and Employment. During this period, she also headed the National Institute of Entrepreneurship and Small Business Development. Prior to that, she was Additional Secretary, Ministry of Home Affairs, Government of India.

In 2020, she retired after having served as the first secretary of the Ministry of Fisheries.

In 2024, she joined the board of directors of the Paytm Payments Bank as an independent director.

== Notable work ==
During her tenure as Director - Primary Education, Government of Haryana in 2002, Sibal played a crucial role in exposing and prosecuting the JBT teachers recruitment scam. This scam involved the illegal recruitment of over 3,000 teachers in 1999-2000, with the use of forged documents. Sibal's efforts led to the case being brought to the attention of the Supreme Court, which subsequently ordered a CBI probe. As a result of the investigation, 55 individuals, including former Chief Minister Om Prakash Chautala and his son Ajay, were convicted. Sibal, who served as the Director of Primary Education at the time, was succeeded by IAS officer Sanjiv Kumar, who was also implicated and convicted in the case.

== Books ==
Sibal is an author and poet. She has authored various books, namely: Cloud’s End and Beyond, Fragrant Words, Kamadhenu, Are You Prepared for a Disaster?, The Haunting Himalayas, Asariri, Women of Influence and The Guru - Guru Nanak's Saakhis.
