= Haryana Seeds Development Corporation =

Indian state government agency

Haryana Seeds Development Corporation Limited
- Type: State Government Undertaking
- Industry: Agriculture and Seeds
- Founded: 1974; 52 years ago
- Headquarters: Panchkula, Haryana, India
- Products: Seeds
- Owner: Government of Haryana
- Website: www.haryanaseeds.gov.in

Haryana Seeds Development Corporation is an Indian state government undertaking company, established in 1974 under the Companies Act, 1956 with the objective of organizing production and distribution of certified seeds to the farmers of the State at reasonable rates.

== Background ==
Haryana Seeds Development Corporation was established to provide quality seeds at affordable price in Haryana state for farmers. HSDC has a Seed Testing Lab at Umri for testing seed samples to measure quality. Their products include an assortment of field crops and vegetables.

== Plants and offices ==
Haryana Seeds Development Corporation has six Seed processing plants at Umri, Hisar, Sirsa, Yamuna Nagar, Tohana and Pataudi in Haryana state. HSDC has one Marketing Office at Bhiwani, Haryana and 74 Sale Counters.The corporation is maintaining a Seed Testing Lab at Umri for testing seed samples as an internal quality control measure.

== Controversy ==
In year 2013, Managing Director Khemka has demand of Central Bureau of Investigation inquiry on purchase nearly 10,000 tonnes of wheat seeds from private suppliers, which was started on 18 October 2013.
