= Chargesheet =

List of crimes an individual is charged with in India

In policing and criminal laws on the Indian subcontinent, a chargesheet by the investigating officer is filed before the competent court after due investigation and collection of evidences in a first information reports (FIRs), and charges an individual for (some or all of) the crimes specified in those reports.

Once the chargesheet has been submitted to a court of law, the court decides as to who among the accused has sufficient prima facie evidence against them to be put on trial. After the court pronounces its order on framing of charges, prosecution proceedings against the accused begin in the judicial system.

In case, the investigating officer, after investigation comes to a conclusion that no offence is made out, then in such case, instead of a Chargesheet, the investigating officer files a FR (Closure Report) before the magistrate. The complainant then may file a protest petition against such FR (Closure report).

== Contents ==
- Names of the parties involved (complainant, accused, witnesses).
- Nature of the information or offense committed.
- List of evidence collected (documents, forensic reports, seized items, photos, cctv transcripts, witness statements).
- Status of the accused (whether arrested, in custody, or released on bail).
- Witness List
- The relevant legal provisions (sections of the Indian Penal Code/Bharatiya Nyaya Sanhita or other laws) under which the accused is charged.
- Conclusion

== Privacy ==
The Supreme Court of India has ruled that chargesheets are not public documents and cannot be made freely accessible to the public, as this would compromise the rights of the accused, victims, and the investigation agencies. They are, however, provided to the accused to prepare their defense.

One copy of the chargesheet, when filed in the court, is provided to the accused by the investigating officer. Also, certified copy of the chargesheet can be taken from the respective court by filing an application for the certified copy.

== Evidentiary Value ==
A chargesheet itself is not a substantive piece of evidence or proof of guilt, it is the opinion of the investigating officer based on their findings during the investigation. The charges mentioned in it must be proven in court during the trial through admissible evidence and witness testimonies.
