= Bhupinder Singh Hooda =

9th Chief Minister of Haryana (born 1947)

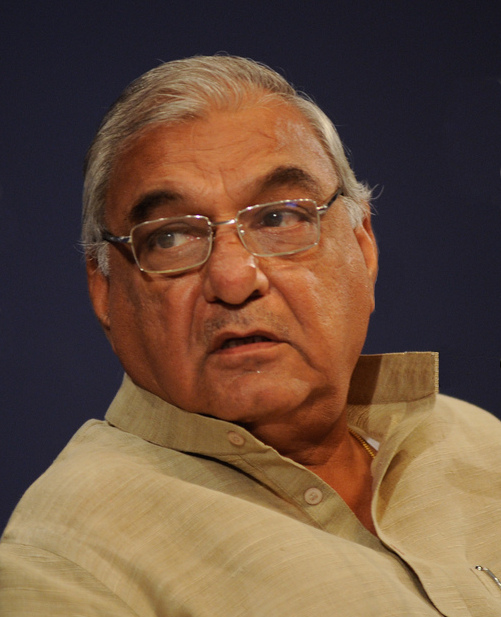
- Hooda in 2010

Leader of the Opposition, Haryana Legislative Assembly
- Incumbent
- Assumed office 29 September 2025
- Preceded by: himself
- In office 2 November 2019 – 12 September 2024
- Deputy: Aftab Ahmed
- Preceded by: himself
- Succeeded by: himself
- In office 4 September 2019 – 27 October 2019
- Preceded by: Abhay Singh Chautala
- Succeeded by: himself
- In office 2001–2004
- Preceded by: Om Prakash Chautala
- Succeeded by: Om Prakash Chautala

9th Chief Minister of Haryana
- In office 5 March 2005 – 26 October 2014
- Preceded by: Om Prakash Chautala
- Succeeded by: Manohar Lal Khattar

Member of the Haryana Legislative Assembly
- Incumbent
- Assumed office 22 October 2009
- Preceded by: Position established Himself as MLA of Kiloi
- Constituency: Garhi Sampla-Kiloi
- In office June 2005 – October 2009
- Preceded by: Krishan Hooda
- Succeeded by: Constituency renamed as Garhi Sampla-Kiloi after delimitation
- Constituency: Kiloi
- In office February 2000 – May 2004
- Preceded by: Krishan Hooda
- Succeeded by: Krishan Hooda
- Constituency: Kiloi

Member of Parliament, Lok Sabha
- In office June 1991 – October 1999
- Preceded by: Devi Lal
- Succeeded by: Inder Singh
- Constituency: Rohtak
- In office May 2004 – June 2005
- Preceded by: Inder Singh
- Succeeded by: Deepender Singh Hooda
- Constituency: Rohtak

President of Haryana Pradesh Congress Committee
- In office February 1997 – July 2002
- Preceded by: Dharam Pal Singh Malik
- Succeeded by: Bhajan Lal Bishnoi

President of Haryana Youth Congress
- In office 1982–1983

Personal details
- Born: 15 September 1947 (age 79) Sanghi, East Punjab, India (present-day Haryana)
- Party: Indian National Congress (1972–present)
- Spouse: Asha Dahiya (m. 1976)
- Children: 2 (including Deepender Singh Hooda)
- Parent: Ranbir Singh Hooda (father)
- Education: Panjab University (B.A.), Faculty of Law, University of Delhi (LL.B)
- Occupation: Politician

Bhupinder Singh Hooda (born 15 September 1947) is an Indian National Congress politician, who is serving as the Leader of the Opposition in Haryana Legislative Assembly. He was the Chief Minister of Haryana from 2005 to 2014.

When he began a second term as chief minister in October 2009 after leading the Congress to an election victory, it was the first time since 1972 that a Haryana electorate returned a ruling party back to power. Hooda is also a Member of the Bar Council of Punjab and Haryana. In 2010, Indian Prime Minister Manmohan Singh constituted the Working Group on Agriculture Production under Hooda's chairmanship to recommend strategies and action plan for increasing agricultural production and productivity, including long-term policies to ensure sustained agricultural growth.

== Early life ==
Bhupinder Singh Hooda was born to Chaudhary Ranbir Singh Hooda and Har devi Hooda at the Sanghi village in Rohtak district of Haryana. His father Ranbir Singh Hooda was a renowned freedom fighter.

He is an alumnus of Sainik School, Kunjpura, Karnal, Haryana and Sainik School, Balachadi, Jamnagar, Gujarat. He did his B.A. at Panjab University, Chandigarh after which he pursued law from the prestigious Faculty of Law, University of Delhi. He started his political career at Youth Congress.

== Political career ==
Chaudhry Bhupinder Singh Hooda was elected as a member of parliament from Rohtak Lok Sabha segment for four terms in 1991, 1996, 1998, 2004. He also remained the Leader of Opposition in Haryana Legislative Assembly from 2001 to 2004. He also served as the President of HPCC (Haryana Pradesh Congress Committee) from 1996 to 2001. In three consecutive Lok Sabha elections of 1991, 96 & 98, he defeated Ch. Devi Lal in electoral battles fought in the Jat heartland of Rohtak in Haryana. He attended international Conferences like World Youth Festival in USSR, World Parliamentary Conference in China, International Conference in USSR as a delegate of AICC and OISCA and International Conferences in Japan and South Korea. Hooda was a vocal supporter for structural reforms within the Congress party and a part of the G23 rebel leaders group. He has been meeting party senior leaders and other G23 leaders to bring about reconciliation.

He is also President, All India Young Farmers' Association, Haryana; Ex-Member, Market Committee, Rohtak; Director, Bank of India, 1989–92; Secretary, Farmers' Parliamentary Forum, 1991 onwards; Founder-Member and Working President of All India Freedom Fighters' Successors' Organisation; Working President, National Federation Railway Porters, Vendors and Bearers. Elected as a President for the Khadi & Village Industries Commission Employees Union & Patron for the National Khadi & Village Industries Board's Employees Federation – an apex body of all State K&V.I Board's Employees Unions.

To encourage youngsters to pick up Olympic sports, Hooda announced a cash award of Rs 25 million for the state athletes who would win gold medal in any discipline at the London Games. Cash prize money of Rs 15 million and Rs 10 million for silver and bronze medal winners has also been announced. Hooda has come under the scanner of the CBI for alleged misappropriation of funds and scams. In 2019, CBI's preliminary inquiry (PE) has revealed that Hooda and TC Gupta, a 1987 batch IAS officer and the then head of the town and planning department, allegedly hatched a criminal conspiracy with private builders to deliberately notify huge chunks of land in various sectors of Gurgaon for acquisition for public purpose. This led to the landowners selling their lands at throwaway prices to private builders. But the government ended up actually acquiring only a small proportion of these notified land tracts.

== Personal life ==
Bhupinder Singh Hooda married Asha Dahiya in 1976. He has two children. His son Deepender Singh Hooda is the MP of Rohtak.

== Positions held ==
=== Positions held in Pradesh Congress Committee ===
SI No.	Post	Tenure
1.	Block Congress Committee, Kiloi, Haryana.	1972-1977
2.	1.) Senior Vice-president, Haryana Pradesh Youth Congress. 2.) Chairman of Panchayat Samiti, Rohtak. 3.) Chairman of Panchayat Parishad of Haryana.	1980-1987
3.	President of the Haryana Pradesh Congress Committee.	1996-2001
4.	Chairperson, Election Management Committee.	Incumbent

=== Government of Haryana ===
SI No.	Post	Date Appointed	Tenure
1.	Leader of the Opposition	2002	2002-2004
2.	Chief Minister	5 March 2005	2005-2009
3.	Chief Minister	25 October 2009	2009-2014
4.	Leader of the Opposition	4 September 2019	12 September 2024
5.	Leader of the Opposition	29 September 2025	Incumbent

== Electoral history ==
=== Lok Sabha ===
SI No.	Year	Lok Sabha	Constituency	Party	Votes	Vote share	Margin	Result
1.	1991	10th	Rohtak	Indian National Congress	2,41,235	44%	30,573	Won
2.	1996	11th	Rohtak	Indian National Congress	1,98,154	31.71%	2,664	Won
3.	1998	12th	Rohtak	Indian National Congress	2,54,951	38.66%	383	Won
4.	1999	13th	Rohtak	Indian National Congress	2,22,233	35.09%	1,44,693	Lost
5.	2004	14th	Rohtak	Indian National Congress	3,24,235	48.97%	1,50,435	Won
6.	2019	17th	Sonipat	Indian National Congress	4,22,800	37.43%	1,64,864	Lost

=== Haryana Legislative Assembly ===
SI No.	Year	Assembly	Constituency	Party	Votes	Vote share	Margin	Result
1.	1982	6th	Kiloi	Indian National Congress	15,240	32.16%	4,553	Lost
2.	1987	7th	Kiloi	Indian National Congress	18,687	33.32%	15,023	Lost
3.	2000	10th	Kiloi	Indian National Congress	39,513	53.48%	11,958	Won
4.	2005bye-election	11th	Kiloi	Indian National Congress	1,06,698	96.68%	1,03,635	Won
5.	2009	12th	Garhi Sampla Kiloi	Indian National Congress	89,849	79.77%	72,100	Won
6.	2014	13th	Garhi Sampla Kiloi	Indian National Congress	80,693	57.28%	47,185	Won
7.	2019	14th	Garhi Sampla Kiloi	Indian National Congress	97,755	65.82%	58,312	Won
8.	2024	15th	Garhi Sampla Kiloi	Indian National Congress	1,08,539	72.72%	71,465	Won

He won Kiloi seat in 2005 after Krishan Hooda vacated his seat

== Corruption allegations ==
There are many cases of corruption filed against Hooda including six CBI cases and several other vigilance department investigations against Hooda underway. Central Bureau of Investigation is investigating several scams, mostly related to illegal land grab, that took place during his rule in Haryana. These investigations include the Gurugram-Manesar IMT land scam, Robert Vadra DLF land grab scam, Gurugram Rajiv Gandhi Trust land grab scam, Sonepat-Kharkhoda IMT land scam case, Garhi Sampla Uddar Gagan land scam, Panchkula-HUDA Industrial plots allotment scam, AJL-National Herald Panchkula land grab scam, Haryana Forestry scam case and Haryana Raxil drug purchase scam. He has been already chargesheeted in the Manesar-Gurugram land scam, while other cases are still under investigation (c. March 2018).

== See also ==
- List of chief ministers of Haryana
- First Hooda ministry
- Dynastic politics of Haryana

Lok Sabha
Preceded by Chaudhari Devi Lal	Member of Parliament for Rohtak; 1991 – 1999	Succeeded by Captain Inder Singh
Preceded by Captain Inder Singh	Member of Parliament for Rohtak; 2004 – 2005	Succeeded by Deepender Singh Hooda
Political offices
Preceded by Om Prakash Chautala	Chief Minister of Haryana; 5 March 2005 – 26 October 2014	Succeeded by Manohar Lal Khattar
