= Haryana Shahari Vikas Pradhikaran =

Urban planning agency in India

- Haryana Urban Development Authority; Hariyāṇā Śaharī Vikāsa Prādhikaraṇa
- Logo of HUDA

State agency overview
- Formed: 30 April 1977
- Preceding State agency: Urban Estates Department, Haryana
- Type: Urban planning
- Jurisdiction: Government of Haryana
- Headquarters: Panchkula, Haryana, India; 30°42′19.12″N 76°51′09.93″E
- Employees: 1404 (2012)
- Annual budget: INR 11 billion (2011–12)
- Ministers responsible: Nayab Singh Saini (Town and Country Planning Minister of Haryana), Chairman; Sanjeev Kaushal Chief Secretary to the Government, Haryana, Vice Chairman
- State agency executive: Sh. T.L. Satyaprakash, IAS, Chief administrator
- Parent department: Government of Haryana
- Key document: Information at a glance
- Website: hsvphry.org.in

Haryana Shahari Vikas Pradhikaran (HSVP), formerly Haryana Urban Development Authority (HUDA), is the urban planning agency of the state of Haryana in India except Gurugram and Faridabad which has Gurugram Metropolitan Development Authority and Faridabad Metropolitan Development Authority respectively. It was established in 1977. The Minister of Town and Country Planning Department, Haryana is the chairman of the authority. The headquarters of the authority is located in Panchkula, Haryana.

HSIIDC is a related government owned agency responsible for the industrial and infrastructure development in the Haryana state. Haryana Financial Corporation provides financial assistance for setting up new industrial units and for the expansion and diversification of the existing industries. Various universities, educational and training institutes, including the nation's first skills university Haryana Vishwakarma Skill University, provide the human resources to capitalise on the finances offered by the HFC and the infrastructure created by the HSIIDC. Among the related initiatives to boost growth, Haryana was the first state to introduce Labour Policy in 2005, and Land Pooling Policy in 2017.

== History ==
HUDA was established in 1977 as a statutory body of the government in 1977 under the Haryana Urban Development Authority Act, 1977 for planned development of cities in Haryana. On 1 June 2017, the cabinet of Government of Haryana headed by the Chief Minister Manohar Lal Khattar decided to rename it to the Haryana Shahari Vikas Pradhikaran (HSVP) because HUDA sounded similar to the surname of former chief Minister Bhupinder Singh Hooda. Due to lack of co-ordination between Urban Estates Department and other departments of the Government of Haryana, the growth of estates started slowing down. Besides, as the Department had to follow the financial rules and regulations of Government, the arrangement of funds and sanction of estimates used to take a long time and the development works did not keep pace with the required standards of physical achievements. It was also felt that being a Government department, it was unable to raise resources from various lending institutions although there were many financial institutions in the country to finance urban development programmes. The Urban Estates Department was not effective in achieving its defined goals of planned urban development to the satisfaction of the public at large. Thus, in order to over come all these difficulties and to achieve the expeditious development of urban estates, it was felt that the Department of Urban Estates should be converted into such a body which could take up all the development activities itself and provide various facilities in the Urban Estates expeditiously and consequently the Haryana Urban Development Authority came into existence on 30 April 1977 under the Haryana Urban Development Authority Act, 1977 to take over work, responsibilities hitherto being handled by individual Government departments.

== HSVP ==
=== Divisions ===
The authority has divided the districts of Haryana into four divisions or zones except Gurugram.

Faridabad Zone

- Faridabad
- Hathin
- Palwal
- Roz-Ka-Meo

Gurugram Zone (except Gurugram city)

- Dharuhera
- Gurgaon
- Narnaul
- Pataudi
- Rewari

Hisar Zone

- Bhiwani
- Fatehabad
- Hansi
- Hisar
- Jind
- Sirsa
- Charkhi Dadri

Panchkula Zone

- Ambala
- Jagadhri
- Kaithal
- Karnal
- Kurukshetra
- Naraingarh
- Panchkula
- Shahbad
- Yamuna Nagar

Rohtak Zone

- Rohtak
- Bahadurgarh
- Panipat
- Sonipat
- Jhajjar
- Gohana
- Rai
- Kundli
- Kharkhoda
- Murthal

=== Departments ===
The authority is divided into the twelve departments.

1. Engineering
2. Finance
3. Town planning
4. Architecture
5. Legal
6. Monitoring
7. Enforcement
8. Vigilance
9. Establishment and Authority
10. Policy
11. Land acquisition
12. Information technology

=== Facilities ===
The authority is responsible for development and maintenance of the following:

- Residential areas
- Commercial areas
- Industrial areas
- Institutional areas

Community buildings developed by HSVP in these areas include:

- Schools
- Colleges
- Hospitals
- Police stations
- Community centres
- Gymkhana clubs
- Old age homes
- Fire stations
- Cremation grounds
- Public parks

== Land Pooling Policy ==
Haryana Land Pooling Policy (HLPP), approved in January 2018, is used by the HSVP for acquiring land from the landlords for developing residential sectors. Landlords join the scheme voluntarily and at least 70% landowners must agree to pool their contiguous land, who receive INR50,000 per acre per year till the land is developed. After the land is developed, the landlords also will receive 33% of the developed residential plots in proportion to the land contributed by them to the pool, 33% will be sold by HSVP, 33% will be used for developing services such as roads and parks.

== See also ==
- Urban planning
- Government of Haryana
- Divisions of Haryana
