= National Herald case =

Ongoing court case in Delhi, India

The National Herald case is an ongoing case in a Delhi court filed by politician Subramanian Swamy against Indian National Congress leaders Sonia Gandhi and Rahul Gandhi, their companies and associated persons.

As per the complaint filed in the court of the Metropolitan Magistrate, Delhi, Associated Journals Limited (AJL) took an interest-free loan of ₹90.25 crore (US$9.4 million) from Indian National Congress. It is alleged that the loan was not repaid. A closely held company, Young Indian, was incorporated in November 2010 with a paid up capital of 5 Lac and it acquired almost all the shareholding of AJL and all its properties (alleged to be worth ₹5,000 crore (US$520 million)), which has been termed by Swamy as criminal misappropriation by Sonia Gandhi and Rahul Gandhi.

== Associated Journals Limited ==
Associated Journals Limited (AJL) is an unlisted public company limited by shares, incorporated on 20 November 1937, with its registered office at Herald House, 5-A, Bahadur Shah Zafar Marg, New Delhi. It was initiated by Jawaharlal Nehru with the support of about 5,000 freedom fighters who became shareholders of AJL. The company's capital was ₹5 lakh (US$5,200) divided into 2,000 preferential shares worth ₹100 (US$1.00) each and 30,000 ordinary (equity) shares worth ₹10 (10¢ US) each. Apart from Nehru, AJL's Memorandum of Association was signed by stalwarts such as Purushottam Das Tandon, Acharya Narendra Dev, Kailash Nath Katju, Rafi Ahmad Kidwai, Krishna Dutt Paliwal and Govind Ballabh Pant. AJL had 1,057 shareholders as of 29 September 2010 as per the annual return filed by the company with the Registrar of Companies.

Congress leader Motilal Vora was the chairman and managing director of AJL for long, beginning with 22 March 2002. The company had incurred losses before its holdings were transferred to Young India in 2011.

AJL published the National Herald newspaper in English, Qaumi Awaz in Urdu and Navjeevan in Hindi until 2008. AJL also owns real estate property in various cities including New Delhi, Lucknow, Bhopal, Mumbai, Indore, Patna and Panchkula. The value of the real estate owned by AJL is estimated to be at ₹50 billion (US$520 million). The properties of AJL include Herald House, a six-storey building in Delhi with around 10,000 sq metre office space.

On 21 January 2016 the AJL in its meeting in Lucknow decided to relaunch the three dailies, National Herald and its sister publications, Quami Awaz and Navjivan.

== Young Indian ==
Young Indian is a "not-for-profit" private company limited by guarantee, incorporated on 23 November 2010 with a capital of ₹5 lakh (US$5,200)and with its registered office at 5A, Herald House, Bahadur Shah Zafar Marg, Delhi. On 13 December 2010, Rahul Gandhi was appointed director of Young Indian while Sonia Gandhi joined the board of directors on 22 January 2011. Of the company's shares, 76 percent are jointly held by Sonia Gandhi and Rahul Gandhi, and the new remaining 24 percent are held by Congress leaders Motilal Vora and Oscar Fernandes (12 percent each).

== Case ==
On 1 November 2012, Swamy filed a private complaint in a court in Delhi alleging that both Sonia Gandhi and Rahul Gandhi have committed fraud and land grabbing worth ₹16 billion (US$170 million) by acquiring a publicly limited company called Associated Journals Limited (AJL) through their owned private company, Young Indian. He also claimed that, through this fraud, they had got the publication rights of the National Herald and Qaumi Awaz newspapers, with real estate properties in Delhi and Uttar Pradesh. He alleged that the acquired properties were given by the government only for the purposes of publishing newspapers, but were used for running a passport office with rental income amounting to millions of rupees.

The complaint further alleged that, on 26 February 2011, AJL approved the transfer of an unsecured loan of ₹90 crore (US$9.3 million) from the All India Congress Committee at zero interest with all ninety million (9 crore) of the company's shares of ₹10 (10¢ US) each to Young Indian. Swamy argued that it is illegal for a political party to lend money for commercial purposes as per Section 29A to C of the Representation of the People Act, 1951, and Section 13A of Income-tax Act, 1961, and demanded investigation by the Central Bureau of Investigation (CBI) and the de-recognition of the Indian National Congress party for using public money.

== Appeal in Delhi High Court and Supreme Court ==
The defendants appealed in the Delhi High Court against the summons issued by the magistrate. Initially , a judge of the Delhi High Court recused himself from hearing the case.

Swamy moved to Supreme Court of India in this matter and on 27 January 2015, the Supreme Court of India directed Swamy to make a case for speedy trial in the Delhi High Court itself.

On 7 December 2015, the Delhi High Court dismissed the appeals of Sonia Gandhi, Rahul Gandhi and others and ordered them to appear in person before the trial court on 9 December, while noting "criminal intent." It disallowed their request for exemption from personal appearance.

After the Delhi High Court dismissed the appeal, many shareholders of AJL alleged that no notice was served on them by AJL for any meeting of the shareholders and that the shares held by their fathers have been transferred by AJL to Young Indian fraudulently without their consent in December 2010. These shareholders included prominent individuals such as former law minister Shanti Bhushan and former chief justice of Allahabad and Madras High Courts Markandey Katju.

On 12 February 2016 the Supreme Court granted exemption to all the five accused in the case from personal appearances while refusing to quash proceedings against them. Later on 12 July 2016 the Delhi High Court set aside the trial court judgement allowing examination of balance sheets and other documents of Congress party and other two companies, the AJL and Young Indian.

== Trial in the magistrate's court ==
On 19 December 2015 the Patiala House court granted bail to all but one and ordered them to appear in the court on the date of next hearing 20 February 2016.

On 11 March 2016 the trial court allowed, after hearing Swamy's plea to examine balance sheets of INC, AJL and Young Indian from 2010 to 2013, which was later overturned by the Delhi High Court.

On 26 May 2018 Subramanian Swamy's application to the trial court seeking a directive for the defendants to verify material filed by Swamy in the National Herald case was denied.

The complaint case registered by Swamy is being heard by the Special MP-MLA Court at the Rouse Avenue District Court as Dr. Subramanian Swamy v. Sonia Gandhi & Ors. The trial is currently at the stage of complainant's evidence, where Swamy is presenting his evidence and witnesses.

== Enforcement Directorate Case ==
On 1 August 2014, the Enforcement Directorate initiated a probe to discover if there was any money laundering in the case. It filed a prosecution complaint case against Sonia Gandhi, Rahul Gandhi, Sam Pitroda, Suman Dubey, Sunil Bhandari, Young Indian, and M/s Dotex Merchandise Pvt. Ltd.

The Enforcement Directorate permanently attached properties worth Rs.64 crore in this Case in May 2019. It again attached properties worth Rs.751.9 crore in the National Herald Case in November 2023.

On 15 April 2025, the Enforcement Directorate filed a chargesheet against Sonia Gandhi, Rahul Gandhi, and Sam Pitroda in this case.

On December 16, 2025, a Delhi court refused to take cognisance of the Enforcement Directorate's money laundering complaint, stating that the complaint was not maintainable because the case is based on a complaint filed by an individual and not on a Police FIR.

ED has challenged this order before Delhi High Court, which is presently being heard there.

== FIR by Delhi Police ==
The Delhi Police’s Economic Offences Wing registered a new FIR in this case on October 3, 2025, on a complaint from an ED officer alleging charges of criminal conspiracy, dishonest misappropriation of property, criminal breach of trust and cheating.

== See also ==
- Panchkula-AJL land scam
