= Rajiv Gandhi Charitable Trust =

Registered non-profit institution

- Founded: 2002
- Founder: Sonia Gandhi, Rahul Gandhi, Priyanka Gandhi
- Type: Non-governmental organization, Indian Trusts Act 1882
- Purpose: Education, Healthcare, Poverty Reduction
- Location: Delhi, India
- Region served: India
- Method: Community Mobilization, Empowerment, Capacity Building, Service Delivery
- Key people: Sonia Gandhi, Chairperson; Deep Joshi, CEO
- Website: www.rgct.in www.rgmvp.org www.igehrc.org

The Rajiv Gandhi Charitable Trust (RGCT) is a registered non-profit institution which was established in 2002 by the Indian National Congress. Named after the 6th Prime Minister of India, the trust is headed by the former president of the Indian National Congress.

== Board of Trustees and Management ==
The Board of Trustees as well as the Management of the Rajiv Gandhi Charitable is heavily influenced by the Indian National Congress.

=== Board of trustees ===
Post in the Trust	Trustees
Chairperson	Sonia Gandhi
	Rahul Gandhi
Business Executive	Dr Ashok Ganguly
Charted Accountant	Bansi Mehta
	Kanishka Singh

=== Management ===
Post in the Trust	Trustees
CEO	Dr YSP Thorat
Deputy CEO	Gajraj Mahendra
CEO & Director, IGEHRC	Dr Sanjay Dhawan

== Initiatives ==
=== Rajiv Gandhi Mahila Vikas Pariyojana ===
Rajiv Gandhi Mahila Vikas Pariyojana (RGMVP) is a flagship program of the Rajiv Gandhi Charitable Trust (RGCT) which "aims to build and strengthen the community institutions of the poor". It is a rights-based initiative that works for poverty reduction, women's empowerment and rural development in the backward regions of Uttar Pradesh. The main activity of RGMVP includes organising poor rural women into community institutions in the form of Self Help Groups (SHGs) – each consisting of 10–20 women – that act as social platforms to address issues of financial inclusion, healthcare, livelihood, education and environment. The organisation has "the belief that the poor have a strong desire and innate ability to overcome poverty".

RGMVP has been designed by RGCT and National Bank for Agriculture and Rural Development (NABARD) with technical assistance from the Society for Elimination of Rural Poverty (SERP) for promotion, credit linkage and federation of SHGs in select districts of Uttar Pradesh. The programme has been visited by the Microsoft Chairman, Bill Gates and the British ex-Foreign Secretary, David Miliband.

=== Indira Gandhi Eye Hospital and Research Centre ===
Indira Gandhi Eye Hospital and Research Centre (IGEHRC) was established by the Trust (RGCT) in 2006 to address a requirement for quality and affordable eye care and eliminate curable blindness in Northern India and Asia. Currently, two hospitals are operating in Uttar Pradesh: a secondary level facility in Amethi, and a tertiary level hospital in Lucknow. Two additional centres are operational in Gurgaon. IGEHRC aims "to provide timely and affordable world-class eye care to all segments of society". Regular community outreach programmes are organised in rural areas to provide quality eye care and to create eye care awareness among the rural population.

== See also ==
- Sonia Gandhi
- Rahul Gandhi
- Indian National Congress
- Nonprofit organization
- Charitable trust
