= Robert Vadra =

Indian businessman (born 1969)

Robert Rajendra Vadra
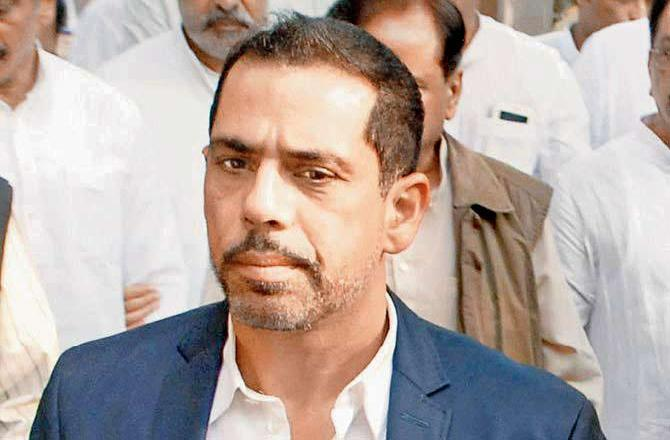
- Vadra in 2019
- Born: 18 April 1969 (age 57); Moradabad, Uttar Pradesh, India
- Occupation: Businessman
- Spouse: Priyanka Gandhi (m. 1997)
- Children: 2
- Relatives: See Nehru–Gandhi family

Robert Rajendra Vadra (born 18 April 1969) is an Indian businessman, and the husband of politician Priyanka Gandhi.

== Early and personal life ==
Robert Rajendra Vadra was born in Moradabad, Uttar Pradesh, to Rajendra Vadra and Maureen on 18 April 1969. His paternal family is of Punjabi descent and settled in Moradabad. The family is originally from Sialkot in present-day Pakistan. Rajendra's father moved to India at the time of partition.

Vadra's mother, Maureen (née McDonagh), is of Anglo-Indian origin, with roots stretching back to Scotland. Rajendra was a resident of Civil Lines, Moradabad, and ran a diamond trading business along with brass and wood handicrafts. Rajendra only completed his high school education.

Robert studied at The British School, New Delhi. His brother Richard died by suicide, and his sister Michelle died in a car accident in 2001. His father was found dead on April 3, 2009, in City Inn, a guest house in the Yusuf Sarai area of Delhi.

He is husband of Wayanad MP Priyanka Gandhi. He is the son-in-law of former Prime Minister of India Rajiv Gandhi and Sonia Gandhi and the brother-in-law of Rahul Gandhi.

== Politics ==
In January 2002, Vadra issued a notice in print newspaper distancing himself from his father and brother as they were misusing his relationship with the Nehru–Gandhi family to make money while promising jobs and other favours. Following this, Sonia Gandhi, the then Congress president also issued a notice to all Congress CMs, state unit heads and senior party members to stay away from Vadra and his family.

Until 2012, while Vadra was mostly in the background, he became a target for several opposition parties after the 2012 anti-corruption movement, India against corruption made allegations against him. These allegations got further politicization after several instances of Congress party spokespersons defending allegations on Vadra, stating he was a soft target.

While Vadra is not into Congress' active politics, he has been actively campaigning for his brother-in-law Rahul Gandhi and mother-in-law Sonia Gandhi. In the Lok Sabha elections of 2019, he campaigned actively across India for several candidates. On his 50th birthday, when asked about his intent to join active politics, Vadra stated it would happen 2–3 years later. He mulled a run in the 2024 Indian general election, but did not file nomination.

== Legal Issues ==
=== DLF Land Grab Case ===
DLF land grab case, also known as Shikohpur Land Deal Case, is related to 50 acre land grab in 2013 in Amipur village of Haryana during the Congress' Bhupinder Singh Hooda government in Haryana, for which Vadra, Hooda and DLF have been alleged for long, in a long drawn legal battle.

On 01 September 2018, an FIR was registered against Hooda, Vadra, DLF and Onkareshwar Properties, for alleged criminal conspiracy, cheating, fraud and forgery, and under provisions of the Prevention of Corruption Act. The Haryana Government constituted an SIT in the given matter. As per certain media reports, the case was closed, with the Haryana Police reporting before the Punjab and Haryana High Court that as reported by tehsildar, Manesar, Gurugram, M/s Skylight Hospitality sold 3.5 acres to M/s DLF Universal Limited on September 18, 2019, and no regulation/rules have been violated in the said transaction.

On the basis of this FIR, Enforcement Directorate (ED) recorded an FIR on 21 December 2018. It presented its prosecution complaint under relevant provisions of the Prevention of Money Laundering Act (PMLA) in July 2025, alleging that Vadra received ₹58 crore as "proceeds of crime" in the Shikohpur, Haryana land deal case. It has alleged that Vadra received ₹53 crore through M/s Sky Light Hospitality Private Limited (Vadra's firm) and ₹5 crore through M/s Blue Breeze Trading Private Limited (BBTPL). In May 2026, Vadra has been granted bail by the Rouse Avenue Court in this case, which is presently under Trial.

=== Bikaner Land Deal Case ===
Vadra's company, Sky Light Hospitality, allegedly illegally purchased and sold 275 bighas of land in the Kolayat area of Bikaner, Rajasthan in January 2010. At that time, Rajasthan was under Congress rule with Ashok Gehlot as its Chief Minister. The transactions allegedly involved forgery, undervalued purchases, and illegal profits.

It has been alleged that Sky Light Hospitality sold this land measuring 31.61 hectares and 37.94 hectares to M/s. Allegeny Finlease Private Limited for around Rs. 2.8 crores. Later, in August 2014, the Colonization Commissioner of Rajasthan informed the Collector of Bikaner regarding certain forged pattas related with the above deal.

Four FIRs were registered in 2014 at Police Station, Gajner, Tehsil Kolayat, Bikaner, for the offences under Sections 420, 467, 468, 471 & 120-B of the Indian Penal Code (IPC) in this matter, in which Charge sheets were filed by Rajasthan Police in August 2015.

Enforcement Directorate registered Enforcement Case Information Report (ECIR) on 17 September 2015. ED attached properties and assets worth ₹4.62 crore linked to Vadra's company and associates, claiming that Sky Light Hospitality illegally generated a profit of ₹4.43 crore from this land.

Vadra's firm went to Rajasthan High Court seeking to quash the case, but on 22 December 2022, the Rajasthan High Court dismmised the petition allowing the ED investigation to proceed.

=== Sanjay Bhandari Arms Deal case ===
The case relates with allegation that certain officers of Indian Air Force (IAF) had entered into a criminal conspiracy with one Sanjay Bhandari and Bimal Sareen, both directors of Offset India Solutions Private Limited. It has been alleged that they dishonestly and fraudulently signed a Service Provider Agreement with Bhandari in June 2010 in violation of the Defence Procurement Procedure, 2008 formulated by the Government of India in the Rs 2895 crore deal of 75 Pilatus basic trainer aircraft. Vadra has also been Charge sheeted in this case through supplementary Charge sheet.
