= List of scandals in India =

Scams that happened in India

The following is a list of proven scandals in India since independence, including political, financial and corporate scandals. The year, or decade, is when the scandal was first reported.

== 1940s ==
- 1948 Jeep scandal case

== 1950s ==
- 1958 Mundhra scandal

== 1970s ==
- 1971 Nagarwala case

== 1980s ==
- 1985 Fodder scam
- 1987 Bofors scandal

== 1990s ==
=== 1991 ===
- Hawala scandal
- Palmolein Oil import scam

=== 1992 ===
- 1992 Indian stock market scam

=== 1995 ===
- Purulia arms drop case
- SNC-Lavalin Kerala hydroelectric scandal

=== 1996 ===
- Disproportionate assets case against J. Jayalalithaa

=== 1997 ===
- Tatra Truck scam
- Jalgaon housing scam

=== 1998 ===
- Anubhav Plantations

== 2000s ==
=== 2000 ===
- India-South Africa match fixing scandal

=== 2001 ===
- Operation West End
- Ketan Parekh
- Roshni Act corruption scandal

=== 2002 ===
- Stamp paper scam
- Best Bakery case
- Provident Fund
- Taj corridor case

=== 2003 ===
- Uttar Pradesh food grain scam
- JBT teacher recruitment scam

=== 2004 ===
- Manesar land scam

=== 2005 ===
- Death of Sohrabuddin Sheikh
- Scorpene deal scam

=== 2006 ===
- Ludhiana City Centre scam
- Navy war room leak case
- Fatwas for cash scandal

=== 2008 ===
- Hasan Ali Khan
- Indian Army ration scam
- 2G spectrum case
- Cash-for-votes scandal
- Operation Kamala

=== 2009 ===
- Deendayal Upadhyaya Trust land scam
- Satyam scandal

== 2010s ==
=== 2010 ===
- 2010 housing loan scam in India
- Concerns and controversies at the 2010 Commonwealth Games
- Adarsh Housing Society scandal

=== 2011 ===
- Belekeri port scam

=== 2012 ===
- DIAL Scam
- Granite scam in Tamil Nadu
- Haryana Forestry case
- Ice cream parlour sex scandal
- Indian coal allocation scam
- Karnataka Wakf Board Land Scam
- Maharashtra Irrigation Scam
- Uttar Pradesh NRHM scam
- Uttar Pradesh sand mining scandal
- National Herald case
- Speak Asia scam

=== 2013 ===
- Vyapam scam
- NSEL case
- Railway bribery scam
- 2013 Indian Premier League spot-fixing and betting case
- 2013 Muzaffarnagar riots
- 2013 Kerala solar panel scam
- 2013 Indian helicopter bribery scandal
- Madhya Pradesh Scholarship scam
- Saradha Group financial scandal

=== 2014 ===
- Pearls Group
- Aavin scam
- Siliguri Jalpaiguri Development Authority
- Gurugram Rajiv Gandhi Trust land grab case

=== 2015 ===
- DMAT scam
- All India Pre Medical Test
- Murder of Sandeep Kothari
- Lalit Modi case
- 2015 cash-for-votes scam
- NSE co-location scam

=== 2016 ===
- 2016 Bihar school examination scandal.
- 2016 Indian banknote demonetisation
- Narada sting operation
- Freedom 251
- Fugitive Economic Offender

=== 2017 ===
- National Testing Agency controversies
- National Testing Agency
- Webwork (Indian web site)
- Sterling Biotech bank loan case

=== 2018 ===
- Punjab National Bank Scam

=== 2019 ===
- Karvy Scam
- INX Media case

== 2020s ==
=== 2020 ===
- 2020 Bengaluru drug raids
- 2020 Kerala gold smuggling case
- TRP scam

=== 2021 ===
- 2022 Delhi liquor policy case

=== 2022 ===
- West Bengal School Service Commission recruitment scam

=== 2023 ===
- Adani Group scandal: In January 2023, Hindenburg Research revealed that it had short positions in India's Adani Group, and flagged debt and accounting concerns. Concurrently, Hindenburg released a report claiming that Indian conglomerate Adani Group "has engaged in a brazen stock manipulation and accounting fraud scheme over the course of decades." Soon after the report's release, Adani Group companies experienced an acute decline in their share prices. In a follow-up piece, The Guardian indicated that Hindenburg called on the Adani Group to sue if they believed the report was inaccurate. By the end of February 2023, the group lost $150 billion in value. Gautam Adani's personal net worth came down as he fell from 3rd richest in the world to 30th richest within a month after the report was published. The opposition leaders called it the "biggest scam" and Modi has been criticized for his lack of reaction towards the scandal.

=== 2024 ===
- Electoral bonds scam: Electoral bonds refers to a mode of funding for political parties in India from their introduction in 2018 until they were struck down as unconstitutional by the Supreme Court of India on 15 February 2024.
- Mahadev Betting App Case
- 2024 NEET controversy
- Indictment against Gautam Adani et al.

=== 2025 ===
- NAAC rating bribery case.
- FIITJEE: In January 2025, FIITJEE, a popular coaching institute for Joint Entrance Examination, faced backlash as several centers across India, including Noida, Ghaziabad, Delhi, Ranchi and other cities, abruptly shut down. The closures, attributed to unpaid salaries and disputes with franchise partners, disrupted the studies of thousands of students. Multiple FIRs were filed against FIITJEE officials for fraud and breach of trust, with allegations of mismanagement and unfulfilled commitments.
- Yashwant Varma: In 2025, a large sum of cash was discovered at his residence during a fire on March 14. An enquiry report was also published by the Supreme Court on the matter and due to sensitivity of the matter, the Supreme Court decided to keep the report redacted from the Public and Parliamentary scrutiny .
- 2022 West Bengal School Service Commission recruitment scam, 2025
- 2025 India cough syrup crisis
- Jane Street scandal

=== 2026 ===
- 2026 NEET controversy
- 2026 CBSE On-Screen Marking controversy

== See also ==
- The Lokpal and Lokayuktas Act, 2013
- Corruption in India
- 2011 Indian anti-corruption movement
- Jan Lokpal Bill
- Right to Public Services legislation
- Corruption Perceptions Index
- Licence Raj
- Mafia Raj
- Rent-seeking
- Lok Ayukta
- United Nations Convention Against Corruption
- Mass media in India
- Fake news in India
- Public Examinations (Prevention of Unfair Means) Act, 2024
