= Ranjit Sinha =

Indian law enforcement official (1953–2021)

Director of the Central Bureau of Investigation
- In office 3 December 2012 – 2 December 2014
- Preceded by: A P Singh
- Succeeded by: Anil Sinha

Personal details
- Born: 27 March 1953 Jamshedpur, Bihar, India
- Died: 16 April 2021 (aged 68)
- Education: Patna University; Indian Institute of Public Administration
- Awards: Indian Police Medal of Meritorious Service; President Police Medal for Distinguished Service; DG's commendation discs in CRPF and ITBP Force.
- Police career
- Country: India
- Service years: 1974–2014
- Batch: 1974

Ranjit Sinha (27 March 1953 – 16 April 2021) was an Indian police officer and was the former director of the Central Bureau of Investigation (CBI). He was the director general of police of the Indo-Tibetan Border Police (ITBP) and the director general of the Railway Protection Force before joining as the CBI director in December 2012 for a two-year tenure. He has also served in senior positions in the CBI in Patna and Delhi.

Sinha had also worked in Central Reserve Police Force as IG (Operations) in Srinagar and IG (Personnel) in Delhi. He had earlier held positions in CBI including the post of joint director and deputy inspector general. He has been associated with the investigations of a number of sensitive and important cases of national and international ramifications. He was selected based on the procedure laid down by CVC Act 2003 and had a tenure of two years. He was selected by the Appointments Committee of the Cabinet.

In addition to his main responsibility of administering the CBI, Sinha also coordinated between different anti-corruption bureaus, the Income Tax Department, and the Central Vigilance Commission (CVC) in fighting corruption. When his appointment was announced, the Bharatiya Janata Party questioned the manner in which Sinha was appointed to head the Central Bureau of Investigation by the Indian National Congress-led government.

== Early life ==
Sinha was born on 27 March 1953 in Jamshedpur in a Kayastha family to Madhuri and N.S. Sinha. He was one among four children with the eldest sister Sarojini Sinha married to 1968 batch Indian Revenue Service (IRS) officer P. K. Sinha. He trained to be a geologist receiving a Master's in Science degree in Geology from the Patna University and later received a Master's Diploma in Public Administration.He has two brothers - Anand Sinha who worked as a senior management official with Tata Steel and the youngest Anjani Sinha. He joined the Bihar cadre of the Indian Police Service (IPS) when he was 21 years old.

== Career ==
Sinha started his career with the police forces in Ranchi, Madhubani and Saharsa districts of Bihar where he became the superintendent of police. In this position, he dealt with communal strife, law and order issues and crime related to international border. He was also involved in counter terror operations as the Inspector General (Operations) in the Kashmir Valley when the bus service between India and Pakistan was started in 2005, and the additional director-general of the Indo-Tibetan Border Force. He worked as the director general of the Railway Protection Force from 14 November 2008 to 19 May 2011, where he set up commando units, bomb disposal squads, quick reaction teams to protect railway stations from terror strikes after the 2008 Mumbai attacks. After having served as the heads of the Railway Protection Force and the ITBP, he was selected as the director of the Central Bureau of Investigation (CBI) in November 2012. He had earlier served in the CBI for 11 years before being appointed its director.

Sinha was awarded the Police Medal for Meritorious Service in 1991 and the President's Police Medal for Distinguished Service in 1997.

=== Appointment as CBI chief ===
The prime minister of India chose Ranjit Sinha as the CBI chief over Sharad Sinha, the director, National Investigation Agency and Atul, director general, Uttar Pradesh who were recommended by the CVC as he was senior to the other two. However, the Bhartiya Janata Party objected to his appointment, protesting that the Government had not followed the collegium system that it had approved and that was part of the Lokpal Bill which was waiting to be passed by the Parliament. The director general of Delhi Police, Neeraj Kumar, who had brilliantly cracked important cases during his 9 years in the CBI, went to court against the non inclusion of his name in the panel prepared by the CVC, but later withdrew his case.

== Controversies and allegations ==
=== The Fodder Scam case ===
In 1996, as a DIG in the CBI under the Joint Director (East), UN Biswas, he was accused of scuttling the investigation to help protect the accused, Lalu Prasad Yadav in the Fodder Scam case. UN Biswas was the chief investigator into the case, whose progress was being monitored by the Patna High Court, and was asked by the court to file a report on the case. The original harsh report by Biswas was swapped with a toned down one authored by Sinha by the then Director CBI, Joginder Singh and submitted to the court. When the court asked why the submitted report did not carry details of the original charges, Biswas admitted before the court that the report had been changed by the CBI Director and that the original report was more damaging. The court indicted the CBI and ordered that Sinha be removed from the case. Later, Sinha, Biswas and other CBI officers apologized to the Privilege Committee Council of the Bihar Legislative Assembly, which decided to drop privilege proceedings against them for lodging a complaint against them to the High Court. Earlier, his father-in-law as the Director General Vigilance was accused of scuttling initial investigations into the Fodder Scam but the accusations could not be substantiated. Sinha was then posted to Bihar Bhawan in New Delhi against a specially created post by Lalu Yadav.

After taking over as the CBI Director, he transferred out four crucial officers investigating the Fodder Scam after obtaining consent of the Jharkhand High Court, but the orders were later cancelled by the Supreme Court of India following filing of a PIL.

=== Problems with Mamata Banerjee ===
As the head of the Railway Protection Force (RPF), Sinha objected to Mamata Banerjee continuing to be provided protection by the RPF commandos, even after she quit as the Railway minister and became the Chief Minister of West Bengal. Banerjee did not take to these objections kindly and got Sinha replaced as the RPF head in May 2011. He was posted in September 2011 as the director general of the ITBP.

He admitted to the controversy, stating:

First of all I completed my tenure in the RPF on 19 May 2011 and Mamata Banerjee became West Bengal chief minister on 20 May 2011. So I remained in the RPF till Mamata Banerjee was the railway minister. But I had my share of problems. Mamata wanted Bangla to be one of the languages for the exam for recruitment the RPF constables. She didn’t like when I said according to rules only Hindi and English are recognised languages for the exam. Besides, she employed RPF guards for her security during election campaign in West Bengal. I was ticked by the MHA as it was not part of the RPF mandate. I showed the temerity to tell her that also.

=== Coalgate Draft Report controversy ===
April 2013, on the behest of the Supreme Court of India, as the CBI director, he submitted an affidavit stating that the draft investigative report on the Indian coal allocation scam was vetted by the Law minister Ashwani Kumar before it was submitted to the court. There was widespread outrage in India on this issue as it undermined the autonomy of the CBI. Observing this the Supreme Court scathingly criticized the UPA government, for its meddling with the report, and the CBI, for behaving like a caged parrot that speaks in its master's voice. Sinha has confirmed the comments of the Supreme Court as being correct.

As a fallout, Ashwani Kumar was sacked as the Minister of Law and Justice. On 6 May 2013, the Supreme Court asked the government to bring a law before 10 July 2013 to "insulate the CBI from external influence and intrusion". Hurriedly, the government set up a Group of Ministers (GoM) under the Finance minister P. Chidambaram to work on the details for implementing the court's order. Sinha appreciated the court's order and stated that he had become a "catalyst of sorts" in making CBI autonomous. He also said that it is a lifetime opportunity for him to try to improve the working of the CBI.

=== The Rail bribery case ===
In 2013, the CBI busted a cash-for-posts scandal in the Indian Railways that led to the resignation of Pawan Kumar Bansal. However, it was also reported that Sinha had held a grudge against Mahesh Kumar, and ordered his phone to be tapped that led to the case being busted.

Sinha appreciated the work by his sleuths stating that they just had the slightest of leads and were able to crack the case. Later, Sinha declared that there was no evidence linking the minister to the scam, which was protested against by the BJP. Sinha ordered a fresh review of all high-level appointments and high-value contracts during the tenures of railway ministers from Mamata Banerjee to Pawan Kumar Bansal.

The railway police association accused Sinha of having a grudge against all railway officials who had complained against him to the Central Vigilance Commission regarding his corrupt ways when he was the director general of the Railway Protection Force. This was however, refuted by the CBI.

Talking about the charges by the railway police association, he has defended himself by stating:

I had taken on vested interest in the RPF. They came up with a booklet leveling all sorts of allegations against me but the union home ministry didn’t find anything against me. I raised objections on retired officials serving in the association. One of my subordinates also became part of the problem and circulated lots of rubbish about me.

=== Political links ===
He was seen to be close to Lalu Prasad Yadav, the Rashtriya Janata Dal supremo, who kept the post of the director general of the Railway Protection Force unfilled for three months till Sinha was appointed to the post. He also accepted that he was friends with Yadav, stating that Lalu was his boss both in the state of Bihar and the Indian Railways and hence, they have good interpersonal relations. He defended himself stating:

I had asked the CBI headquarter to post me outside of Patna. Being a Bihar cadre officer I didn’t want to get associated with fodder scam probe. But nobody listened to me. It was very confusing time. The centre was weak and Lalu was a powerful regional satrap. Bihar was totally divided on the caste lines. I was made a villain by my powerful enemies in the state despite the monitoring bench of the Patna high court not even once making an adverse remark against me. I still believe things went little overboard during the investigation in the fodder scam due to some seniors who assiduously cultivated larger than life image.

== Personal life and death ==
Sinha was married to Reena, daughter of IPS officer, Gajendra Narain. He had one daughter and one son; his daughter is married to Awanish Sharan, an Indian Administrative Service (IAS) officer, Chhattisgarh cadre, and his son is in Delhi after pursuing law in the Netherlands.

Sinha died on 16 April 2021 in Delhi, at the age of 68. He had previously been diagnosed with COVID-19.
