= Webwork =

Webwork can refer to:

- WeBWorK, a web-based homework system by the University of Rochester
- Webwork (Indian web site), a website portal accused of being a ponzi scheme
- WebWorks, a platform for BlackBerry
- A webwork plot, a type of literary form defined and practiced by Harry Stephen Keeler
- WebWork, the previous name of Apache Struts 2, an open-source web application framework

== See also ==
- Web worker
