= Uttar Pradesh sand mining scandal =

Illegal sand mining

The Uttar Pradesh illegal sand mining scam is a political scandal relating to events that occurred in 2012–2017 during the Samajwadi Party (SP) rule in Uttar Pradesh. It is being investigated by the Central Bureau of Investigation (CBI) on the 2016 orders of Allahabad High Court for allowing illegal mining in 7 districts of Uttar Pradesh – Shamli, Hamirpur, Fatehpur, Siddharthnagar, Deoria, Kaushambi and Saharanpur – in violation of rules and ban by the National Green Tribunal. On 5 January 2019, the CBI raided 14 suspects in 14 locations in 7 cities across Uttar Pradesh and Delhi pertaining to this scam, and incriminating evidence was seized.

CBI is likely to investigate former Uttar Pradesh Chief Minister Akhilesh Yadav and former minister Gayatri Prasad Prajapati, both of whom were respectively in charge of Uttar Pradesh mining ministry when the Samajwadi Party ruled the state from 2012 to 2017. CBI has filed an FIR against 11 suspects, which additionally specifies that the role of then ministers of mining, Yadav and Prajapati, will also be investigated. According to CBI FIR, Yadav had approved 13 mining leases on a single day in his capacity as Chief Minister-cum-minister for mines.

== Unearthing of the scam ==
The initial reports of scam started to pour out for illegal sand mining during the earlier BSP rule as well as the current SP rule. In June 2013, Durga Shakti Nagpal launched a massive crackdown on illegal mining. On 23 July 2013, Nagpal had said that she would take strict action against dredgers engaged in illegal mining, adding that such activity could affect the environment adversely. Since April 2013, the Uttar Pradesh Police had filed 17 FIRs and the Chief Judicial magistrates had ordered the arrest of illegal sand miners in 22 cases. From April to June 2013, the police had impounded 297 vehicles and machinery used for illegal mining and collected Rs 8,234,000 in fines. Under Nagpal, a joint operation involving the revenue, police and transport departments was launched and villages of Asgarpur, Nangla Wajidpur, Gulavli, Kambakshpur, and Jaganpur Chaproli were monitored. On 25 July, the government transferred the mining officer of the GB Nagar district Ashish Kumar, who was assisting Nagpal, to Bulandshahr. Before being transferred, Kumar survived three attempts on his life, the last one was on 9 February 2013. Nagpal was also targeted on 26 April 2013, during a visit to the Kasna police station. These attacks were attributed to the "sand mafia" operating in the district.

In 2016, BJP-led Union Ministry of Mines of India had criticized the Uttar Pradesh government for allowing arbitrary allotment, instead of a transparent auction, for mining leases and contracts for some minerals such as gypsum, mica, quartz and sand, which also considered issuing a directive to overrule the state action since it was in violation of the Supreme Court of India’s orders against arbitrary allotment of mines.

== Legal cases and investigations ==
On September 9, 2016, Allahabad High Court ordered a CBI enquiry against the illegal mining across Uttar Pradesh, and then Uttar Pradesh Chief Minister Akhilesh Yadav removed mines minister Gayatri Prasad Prajapati for his alleged collaboration with the mining mafia. Before that from 2012 to June 2013, Yadav himself was in charge of mining in the UP state mining ministry before Prajapati was made the mining minister. House and offices of Samajwadi Party MLC Ramesh Mishra, BSP politician Satyadev Dikshit and 2008 batch IAS officer B Chandrakala were raided, and incriminating evidence including documents, INR 2 crore cash and jewellery were seized from 14 locations in 7 cities. Chandrakala is accused of bypassing the rules to illegally allocate the mines. Prajapati was earlier arrested in 2017 in an unrelated rape case.

== Current status ==
The case is under investigation by the CBI.

== See also ==
- List of scandals in India
- Corruption in India
- The Lokpal Bill, 2011
- Uttar Pradesh NRHM scam
