= Mohindroo =

Mohindroo is a surname. Notable people with the surname include:

- Pankaj Mohindroo
- Chelsea Mohindroo of The JMU Overtones and The Voice (American season 4)
- Sanjay Mohindroo, see Concerns and controversies over the 2010 Commonwealth Games
