= 2010 housing loan scam in India =

The 2010 fake housing loan in India was uncovered by the Central Bureau of Investigation (CBI) in India. CBI arrested eight top-ranking officials of public sector banks and financial institutions, including the LIC Housing Finance CEO Ramchandran Nair, in connection with the scam.

== CBI investigations ==
CBI alleged that the officers of various public sector banks and financial institutions received bribes from a private financial services company, which acted as a mediator for corporate loans and other facilities from financial institutions. The bank officials sanctioned large-scale corporate loans to realty developers, overriding mandatory conditions for such approvals along with other irregularities.

The Central Bureau of investigation arrested number of high official from the several financial institutes in India in connection with the housing scam in 24 November 2010. Smith (2010) stated that findings are shocking where the head officers of several banks and financial institutes are involved in corporate corruption. Precisely, the banks and financial officials were from the public sectors including LIC, Bank of India, Central Bank of India and Punjab National Bank. However, stated that since the matter was related to the erosion of funds from the LIC housing and Finance Limited, event was named as the LIC housing and Finance Scandal. Lamont (2010) cited that the officers from the high rank including the secretary of LIC Investment, general managers, directors and deputy managers of banks were involved in taking out the funds from LIC in appropriate and unethical way. Smith (2010) said that these officials were acting as the middleman to provide the funds to the main parties and in return they were having hefty amount of funds from the real investors, insurers and other consumers. Smith (2010) regarded this as the distortion of the corporate governance system where the business ethics were neglected to sustain the core business activities of the public sector banking firm. Meanwhile, Economic Times stated that the officials were charged with the exploiting of funds, looting, corrupting corporate loan process and manipulating and overriding with the regulations of the LIC Housing and Finance Limited in regard to the approvals and other rules and regulations. Nonetheless, The loans provided through this manner were estimated to be worth of 85 Billion Dollars, comes as the biggest scandal in the Housing Finance in Asia However, the stock price took a sharp dip soon after the event. Apparently, LICHF had a good run till September 2010 when it reached Rs.299 and the growth rate undoubtedly, received the appreciation by the investors and other shareholders. The stock recorded no significant changes thereafter but the appearance of corporate scandal shook the stock price chart and the price dip to Rupees 150 by the end of year 2010.

At present the stock price is stands at around rupees 190 and gaining its momentum over a period of time but Lamont (2010) felt that the combination of factors that happened in the last quarter of FY10 were accountable for the sharp decline in the LIC Housing and Finance Share price. Reuters stated that LIC Housing and Finance is looking forward to raise the capital to the tune of Rupees 25000 Crores in 2011-12 through debt. Eventually, the technical experts believed that company is developing its core competencies and capabilities and undoubtedly, investors would revive the stock price and current Market changes and company’s development will be seen through the price momentum. However, experts believed that the Housing and Finance Scandals by the top officials in LIC and other banking institutes will always stand to harm the future potential of such companies but the future and the endless opportunities lies in the hand of ultimate investors. Eventually, Online newspaper, Rediff quoted as saying that most of the brokers are taking up the stock of LICHF after the scam as related to the current project being performed by the company. Namely, IIFL, Aditya Birla, IL&FS are impressed by the current progress by the company and building up the stock ay higher rate. However, Reuters stated that the Financial Budget introduced by the Indian Planning Commission had slightly adverse effects on the stock of banking, insurance, mortgages and other related sector in the industries. However, the company has been quoted as saying that they would include the margin between 2.8 and 3% in relation to the rising interest rates and their effects on the share price. However, In response the scam, the Reserve Bank of India and other regulatory and financial bodies attempted to reform the housing finance sector by making several supervision and security measures in this regard. Eventually, the corporate scam destroyed the interest and confidence of investors and thus, the monetary and regulatory authorities must execute their task in relation to safeguarding the interests of investors. Apparently, Smith (2010) stated that the Central Bureau of Investigation exposed the stock price dip to 18% of the prevailing market rate after the scam and other banks who were involved saw a decline between 5 and 15% during the time. Hence, it was anticipated that investors believed in the core values and company’s relation with the investors and the stock changes occur in the short span of time however, the stock is futuristic for the long term.

CBI's Economic Offences Wing (EOW) raided offices of the public sector banks and LIC Housing Finance in six cities (Mumbai, Delhi, Chennai, Jaipur, Kolkata and Jalandhar), to recover incriminating documents.

According to CBI, the companies to which the loans in question were given include:

- Lavasa Corp., a unit of Hindustan Construction Co.
- Ashapura Minechem Ltd.
- Suzlon Energy Ltd.
- DB Realty Ltd., a part of the Dynamix Balwas Group
- Emaar MGF Land Ltd.
- Mantri Realty
- Kumar Developers Ltd.

The CBI EOW also suspected that the companies may have inflated their assets value and balance sheets in order to make themselves eligible for the loans.

According to CBI, an employee of the financial services firm had expressed his willingness to turn witness in the case.

== Reactions ==
Most firms, including BGR Energy and Oberoi Realty denied any role in the scam.

The scam was discovered shortly after the 2010 Commonwealth Games corruption controversy and the Adarsh Housing Society Mumbai scam. The investors were rattled as news of the arrests broke in Mumbai. The share of the LIC Housing Finance, Central Bank of India, Punjab National Bank, Bank of India as well as other banking and real-estate stock declined.

The Union finance ministry initially claimed that the case was a bribery incident, and not a large-scale scam. The CBI officials had indicated that the size of the scandal could be worth over Rs 1,000 crore, but the finance ministry officials claimed that the magnitude of the scandal was too insignificant to affect the Indian financial sector.

The income-tax (IT) department decided to investigate the books of those involved in the scam, after receiving primary reports from CBI. However, many political analysts believe innocent bankers were implicated in this falsely created scam to defuse attention of the common man against the much larger and serious scams done by the ruling Indian government, notably of corrupt politicians like CWG minister Suresh Kalmadi and ex-telecom minister A Raja.

== See also ==
- Corruption Perceptions Index
- Indian political scandals
- Jan Lokpal Bill
- Rent seeking
