= Freedom Phone (disambiguation) =

The Freedom Phone is another name for the Umidigi A9 smartphone. It can also refer to:

- Freedom 251, a smartphone sold in India.
- devices sold by Freedom Mobile, a Canadian wireless carrier.
