= Amar Pratap Singh =

Director of Central Bureau of Investigation

Director Central Bureau of Investigation
- In office 30 November 2010 – 30 November 2012
- Preceded by: Alok Verma
- Police career
- Country: India

Amar Pratap Singh is an Indian government official who served as Director of Central Bureau of Investigation (CBI) from 2010 to 2012. Singh oversaw investigations into the 2G spectrum case alleged misconduct during the 2010 Commonwealth Games, which resulted in the arrests of figures including A. Raja and Suresh Kalmadi. The CBI implicated Singh in a corruption investigation after he left office; his home was raided and he was booked in 2017.
