= Anil Sinha =

Indian IPS officer and director of CBI

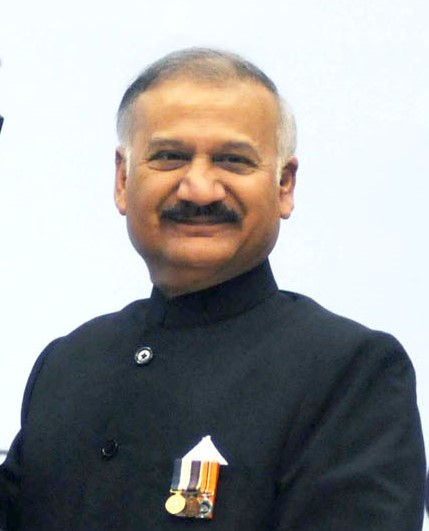
- Anil Kumar Sinha

Director Central Bureau of Investigation
- In office 3 December 2014 – 2 December 2016
- Preceded by: Ranjit Sinha
- Succeeded by: Alok Verma

Personal details
- Born: 16 January 1956 (age 70) Buxar, Bihar
- Education: Harvard University, JNU
- Awards: Police medal for meritorious service in 2000 and the President's police medal for distinguished service in 2006.
- Police career
- Country: India
- Service years: 1979 - 2016
- Rank: 1979: Appointed as an Indian Police Service officer
- Batch: 1979
- Cadre: Bihar

Anil Sinha or Anil Kumar Sinha (born 16 January 1956) is a Bihar Cadre Indian Police Service officer of the 1979 batch and was the Director of the Central Bureau of Investigation till 2 December 2016. He had earlier served as DIG and IG in Special Protection Group, New Delhi, and Additional Secretary in Central Vigilance Commission.

== Education ==
Anil Sinha possesses a post-graduate degree in psychology and an MPhil degree in strategic studies. He is an alumnus of the Kennedy School of Government, Harvard University. He also attended the National Defence College, India.

== Career ==
Anil Sinha held several positions in his State cadre in Vigilance & Anti-Corruption, Administration, Special Branch & other Divisions as SP, DIG, IG & ADG. He has served as Additional Director-General of Police (Law & Order) and thereafter as Additional DG, he also headed the Vigilance Investigation Bureau. He has been associated with the investigations of a number of sensitive cases, including a large number of trap cases and Disproportionate Assets Cases against corrupt public servants.

He had received the Police Medal for Meritorious Service in 2000 and the President’s Police Medal for Distinguished Service in 2006.
