= Uttar Pradesh food grain scam =

Large-scale fraud in India, 2002 to 2010

Uttar Pradesh food grain scam took place between years 2002 and 2010, in Uttar Pradesh state in India, wherein food grain worth ₹350 billion (US$3.6 billion), meant to be distributed amongst the poor, through Public Distribution System (PDS) and other welfare schemes like Antyodaya Anna Yojana (AAY), Jawahar Rozgar Yojana and Midday Meal Scheme for Below Poverty Line (BPL) card holders, was diverted to the open market. Some of it was traced to the Nepal and Bangladesh borders, as in 2010 security forces seized Rs 11.7 million worth of foodgrains like paddy and pulses being smuggled to Nepal, another Rs 6062,000 worth of grains were confiscated on the Indo-Bangladesh border.

The scam first came into light in 2003, during the Chief Minister ship of Mulayam Singh, in Gonda district in the distribution of foodgrain meant for the Sampoorna Grameen Rozgar Yojana and soon complaints started pouring in from other districts as well. After initially ordering an inquiry into the scam Mulayam Singh withdrew it. The Special Investigation Team ( SIT) set up by the Mulayam Singh government in 2006, lodged over 5,000 FIRs. The next UP chief minister Mayawati upon assuming office, ordered a CBI probe into the scam on 1 December 2007. Media dubbed it, "mother of all scams", and TV news channel, Times Now reported the scam which started in 2002, under the reign of following Chief Ministers of Uttar Pradesh, estimated to be at over ₹2,000 billion (US$21 billion). Uttar Pradesh as with other states and UTs, is allocated a monthly quantity of foodgrains, i.e. rice and wheat, by the Central government for distribution amongst AAY, BPL and APL families, under TPDS managed by the state government. For the period from April 2010 to March 2011, this quantity for the state was 528395 tons.

== Overview ==
The Central government allocates foodgrains to each state government for distribution through ration shops at subsidised rates to the poor. Under the PDS scheme, each BPL (Below Poverty Line) family is eligible for 35 kg of rice or wheat every month, while an APL (Above Poverty Line) household is entitled to 15 kg of foodgrains on a monthly basis.

According to a report in Outlook magazine:

Instead of using the Food Corporation of India and the Shipping Corporation the Government cleared a private company to send the rice and earn the profits. Rice sent to Sierra Leone had a Swiss company named Novell as the buyer. 1,17, 000 tonnes of rice was sent to Nigeria which had a bumper crop and refused to accept the rice. Then the rice was diverted to South Africa which has higher per capita income than India. The African countries could have been just a front to sell the rice in international markets. "But the rice did not even reach the desired African countries. It went somewhere else and resulted in an escalation of the international prices,” Rajya Sabha MP D Raja said.

== History ==
The Regional Food Controller's office in the state is responsible for procuring the food-grain, while the District Rural Development Agency (DRDA) is in charge of its distribution. An embezzlement by a section of officers from the controller's office made news in March 2004, after 70 truckloads of rice meant for distribution was lifted from the Food Corporation of India (FCI) and when FCI demanded its payment, a project director refused to verify the stock register, gradually it was revealed that they had been selling the grains in the black market and a probe was ordered. As per initial estimates at the time, foodgrain worth Rs 150 billion could have been diverted from the Antyodaya Yojana (food-for-work scheme) over the last five years. By December 2004, Chief Minister Mulayam Singh Yadav had suspended a district magistrate of Lakhimpur Kheri and several officials of the food department and political parties including the CPI, Congress and BJP were increasing pressure on the government to order a CBI probe.

First FIRs in the case were filed in January 2005, when the state government acknowledged the scam to be worth Rs. 450 billion under the Central government sponsored Antyodaya Anna Yojana (AAY). Apart 65 officials named in the FIR, further over 300 persons were suggested to be involved in the preliminary reports. Apart from that a district magistrate, six ADMs and a few district food and supplies officials were suspended.

In April 2007, Union Minister, Kapil Sibal demanded a probe by the Central Bureau of Investigation (CBI) into the illegal sale by private traders who procured the grains from the warehouses of Food Corporation of India, diverting food grains allotted to the state for the poor. Alleging that the scam took place from August to November 2004, when Rajpal Tyagi was leading the Rural Development ministry. At first the scam was investigated by the Economic Offences Wing (EOW) of the Uttar Pradesh Police (UPP), followed by a Special Investigation Team (SIT) set up by the Mulayam Singh government, after its investigations in three districts, Sitapur, Lakhimpur Kheri and Gonda, SIT lodged over 5,000 FIRs.

When Mayawati became Chief Minister, SIT investigations had revealed the scam to be larger in scale and multi-dimensional, covering many welfare schemes like Antyodaya, Sampurana Grameen Swarojgar Yojna during 2002-2005, thus a CBI inquiry on ordered 1 December 2007; the scam was now worth Rs. 350 billion.

Two years later in early December 2009, CBI lodged 9 cases, identifying nearly 150 government officials, including some PCS officer as accused; in all nine people were arrested, with one of them being the chief finance and accounts officer of the District Rural Development Authority (DRDA) in Ballia and his junior.

The Lucknow Bench of the Allahabad High Court, responding to a PIL, on 23 December 2009, directed the Uttar Pradesh government to file a status report on all the nine food grain scams in the state from 2000 till 8 January 2010 being investigated by the CBI.

On 3 December 2010, the Lucknow Bench of the Allahabad High Court, responding to public interest litigation (PIL) filed by advocate Vishwanath Chaturvedi, directed the Central Bureau of Investigation (CBI) to conduct and complete an inquiry within six months, into the foodgrain scam in Gonda, Lucknow, Varanasi, Ballia, Lakhimpur Kheri and Sitapur districts. It also stated, that "It shall not be necessary for the CBI or state agencies to obtain sanction under the statutory provision with regard to present controversy where from initial stage, prima facie intentionally, deliberately and in a planned manner, the foodgrains were lifted from godowns for sale either in the open market or to smuggle outside UP or to other countries, " The bench also asked the Centre and Uttar Pradesh government, to consider appropriate amendments in the "Prevention of Corruption Act, 1988. Though period under investigation is till 2007, the court also directed that "it should be open to the CBI and state agencies to proceed with investigation with regard to the scam not only up to 2007 but even beyond in case some link evidence/material is found with regard to continuance of diversion of foodgrain under various schemes of the state and Central governments."
