= Freedom 251 =

2016 controversial smartphone

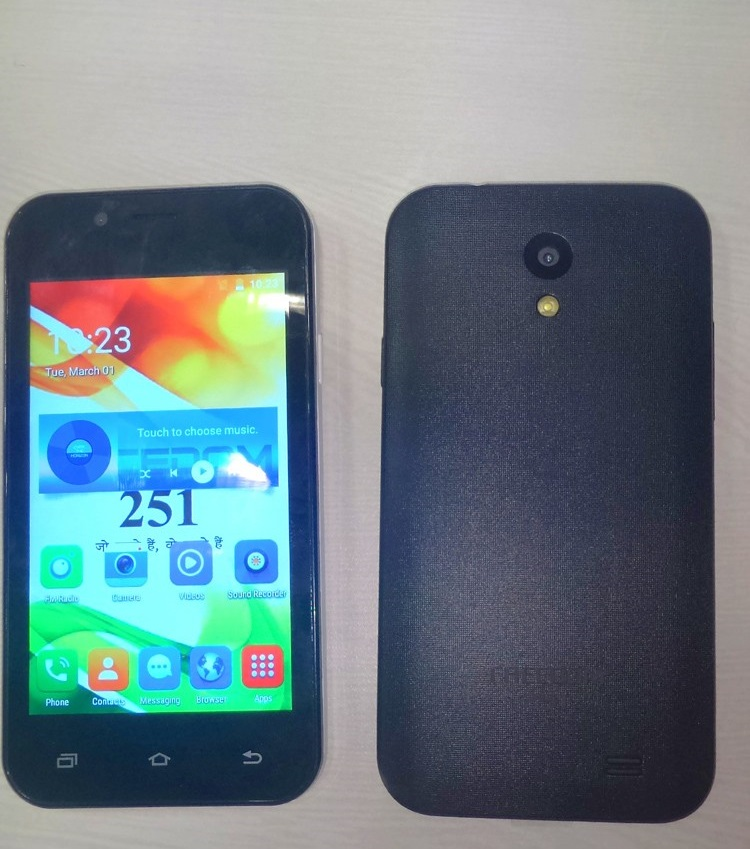
- Brand: Ringing Bells
- Manufacturer: Ringing Bells Private Limited
- Type: Smartphone
- Series: Freedom series
- First released: February 18, 2016; 10 years ago
- Availability by region: India
- Compatible networks: 2.5G, 3G, HSUPA
- Form factor: Slate
- Weight: 130 g (4.6 oz)
- Operating system: Android 5.1 Lollipop
- System-on-chip: MediaTek MT6580
- CPU: 1.3 GHz Quad-Core ARM Cortex-A7
- GPU: Mali-400 MP
- Memory: 1 GB RAM
- Storage: 8 GB
- Removable storage: Up to 32 GB MicroSD
- Battery: 1450 mAh Lithium-ion battery
- Rear camera: 3.2 megapixel
- Front camera: 0.3 megapixel
- Display: 102 mm (4.0 in) qHD IPS Display (960x540 pixels)
- Connectivity: Wi-Fi, Bluetooth 3.0, USB 2.0, DLNA, UMA
- Data inputs: Touchscreen, Accelerometer, Magnetometer, Proximity sensor, Ambient light sensor
- Other: Wi-Fi Hot Spot, FM radio

The Freedom 251 is a smartphone that was initially offered for sale in India in 2016 at the promotional price of ₹251 (US$3.74). It was sold by Ringing Bells Private Limited and promoted as the world's cheapest smartphone. The announcement attracted widespread public attention and millions of orders, but was soon met with skepticism over its pricing, feasibility, and delivery capacity.

Allegations of fraud emerged when it was revealed that early units were rebranded phones from another company, and only a small number of devices were ever delivered. Kirit Somaiya, a Member of Parliament from the Bharatiya Janata Party, publicly stated that the phone was "bogus" and described the promotion as a Ponzi scheme. He filed a complaint that led to a first information report (FIR) being registered against Ringing Bells director Mohit Goel and president Ashok Chaddha under Section 420 of the Indian Penal Code and the Information Technology Act. However, the Allahabad High Court stayed the FIR on the grounds that it was premature at that stage of investigation.

== Promotion ==
The promotional price was offered for a limited time only to online bookings between 18 and 21 February 2016. Traffic was so high on the website that it crashed on the first day. The company says that the regular price will be about ₹500 (US$7.44).

The company planned to sell 5 million phones by June 2016. At the point its website crashed, it had taken bookings for only 30,000 at the Rs 251 price. By the time bookings closed, Ringing Bells claimed they had taken bookings worth ₹1.75 lakh (US$2,604.35).

== Money refund ==
Ringing Bells had promised to provide refunds to 30,000 customers who pre-booked the Freedom 251 on the first day of the sale. The company stated that the refunds should have reached customers during the first week of March 2016.

The company has said that negative speculation around the Rs 251 smartphone has led them to take the step, and that customers who have booked the phone will now pay only after the smartphone is delivered to them.

== Controversies and criticism ==
The Indian Cellular Association (ICA) has doubted that a smartphone can realistically be sold at a price as low as Rs 251 and have asked the Telecom Minister, Ravi Shankar Prasad, to intervene. According to the ICA, even with a subsidised sale, the selling price should not be less than Rs 3,500 (US$52.28 as of 31 August 2016). The ICA also complained that senior members of the government had been present at the product launch.

The prototype showcased and handed out to media at the time of launch were rebadged Adcom devices, for which Adcom threatened to sue Ringing Bells. But units circulated later were totally different from the original prototype.

According to Narayanan Madhavan writing in the Hindustan Times, a price of Rs 251 is possible only through deals with advertising partners. Such deals would only be possible once a very large number of handsets were in use.

On 20 February 2016, the offices of Ringing Bells were raided by government officials investigating why the product does not have a Bureau of Indian Standards certification.

Some commentators indicate that the Freedom 251 sale is a scam. The phone resembles a Chinese phone where the original brand label was covered with whitener. The icons shown on screen shots are copied from Apple's iPhone. There are also reports that many people ordered the phone but did not even receive a confirmation email. Bharatiya Janata Party MP Kirit Somaiya described Ringing Bells as "a Ponzi bogus company scam". He has requested that the Telecom Ministry, the Telecom Regulatory Authority of India, and various other ministries investigate the company. As a result of these concerns, the payment gateway facilitator PayUBiz decided to withhold payment to Ringing Bells until the items were dispatched.

The Telecom Ministry after conducting an internal assessment on the phone found that it could not be offered for less than Rs. 2,300–2,400 (US$34.36–35.85 as of 31 August 2016).

Ringing Bells has also been accused of fraud and non-payment of dues by its customer services provider Cyfuture. Subsequent investigation revealed that the company not only duped its customers but also its suppliers and employees. Freedom 251 scam amount is believed to be around ₹20 crore (US$2.98 million)

Goel was later arrested by Indian authorities over the aforementioned fraud allegations, after the owner of Ghaziabad-based Ayam Enterprises filed an FIR alleging that Ringing Bells “defrauded” it of ₹16 lakh (US$23,811.19).

The domain expired and was auctioned by Godaddy. On 24 March 2019, the new owner converted it into a tech blog.

== Delivery ==
Ringing Bells says it had delivered 5,000 units of Freedom 251 by 9 July 2016, and claimed to be delivering another 65,000 units to customers.
