= Sterling Biotech bank loan case =

Financial fraud in India

Sterling Biotech bank loan case is a major financial scandal in India involving the diversion of bank loans and money laundering by the promoters of Sterling Biotech Limited, a Vadodara-based pharmaceutical company. The case, one of the largest bank frauds in the country's history, involved alleged defaults and siphoning of funds ₹8,100 crore (equivalent to ₹120 billion or US$1.3 billion in 2026) crore through a network of shell companies.

In April 2026, the Supreme Court of India approved a full and final settlement proposed by the promoters. Pursuant to the settlement, the promoters paid a cumulative total of approximately ₹9,800 crore (US$1.0 billion) to the secured lender banks and into the Supreme Court registry. The Court directed that all related criminal, regulatory and civil proceedings be quashed, and the matter was formally closed on 15 April 2026.

== Background ==
Sterling Biotech was founded in the 1990s as a pharmaceutical manufacturer, promoted by Nitin Sandesara, Chetan Sandesara, and Dipesh Patel. The company, listed on the both Indian stock exchanges, was into manufacturing of active pharmaceutical ingredients from their facilities in Gujarat. By the mid-2010s, it had expanded into special economic zones and other ventures under the Sterling Group, including Sterling SEZ and Infrastructure Limited.

The controversy around the company centres on big-ticket loans taken from a consortium of public sector banks led by Andhra Bank (now merged with Union Bank of India). Between 2008 and 2016, the group secured credit facilities exceeding ₹8,100 crore (equivalent to ₹250 billion or US$2.6 billion in 2026) for expansion projects. Investigations revealed that these funds were later diverted through fabricated documents, inflated project costs, and a web of over 249 domestic and 96 offshore shell entities in countries including Nigeria, United Arab Emirates, United Kingdom, British Virgin Islands, United States, Mauritius, Panama, and Barbados.It was also revealed during the investigation that the promoters used employees to incorporate these entities, round-tripped standby letters of credit worth ₹4,500 crore (equivalent to ₹69 billion or US$720 million in 2026), and laundered proceeds via benami transactions.

Early red flags emerged in 2005 when Securities and Exchange Board of India probed share dealings by Sterling Biotech and Sterling International Enterprises Limited (formerly Transworld Infotech Limited) for suspicious trading patterns from August to September 2005. Promoters were accused of concealing benami entities and pressuring regulators to stall the inquiry. By 2017, the loans turned non-performing assets, prompting complaints from banks.

== Investigations ==
Investigations began in 2017 following bank complaints:

- Central Bureau of Investigation: Registered two FIRs in August–October 2017 for cheating and corruption. Filed charge sheets against 191 accused, including 184 companies.
- Enforcement Directorate: Launched PMLA probes, attaching assets worth over ₹14,500 crore (equivalent to ₹160 billion or US$1.6 billion in 2026) crore by 2020, including London properties and Nigerian oil assets. Five prosecution complaints filed; four key accused declared fugitives - included the Sandesara brothers, Dipti Sandesara (Chetan's wife), and Hitesh Kumar Patel.
- SEBI: Continued scrutiny from 2005–2007 probes into share manipulations.
- Serious Fraud Investigation Office and Income Tax Department: SFIO initiated corporate fraud probes; IT filed Black Money Act cases.

The Sandesara brothers went to Nigeria in 2017 using Albanian passports, evading arrest. Interpol notices were issued, and Nitin Sandesara was briefly detained in Dubai in 2018.

In March 2021, Hitesh Patel was detained in Albania.

== Settlement ==
In November 2025, a bench led by Justice J.K. Maheshwari approved a one-time settlement of ₹6,761 crore (Indian entities: ₹3,826 crore; foreign guarantors: ₹2,935 crore), of which ₹3,507.63 crore was already deposited, leaving ₹3,253.37 crore plus additional recoveries. The court mandated a final ₹5,100 crore deposit by 17 December 2025 for full quashing of CBI, ED, SFIO, IT, and FEOA cases, emphasising public money recovery but clarifying no precedent. However, the ruling sparked debate, with the government reviewing implications for similar cases. Especially the investigation agencies expressed concerns over weakened deterrence.

On 17 December 2025, ₹5,111 crore (US$530 million) deposited with the Supreme Court registry as per the Supreme Court directives.

On 13 April 2026, the Supreme Court was informed that a balance amount of ₹0.45 crore (US$47,000) was deposited by demand draft to complete all remaining formalities.

On 15 April 2026, the Supreme Court formally declared that the case had attained finality, with all dues satisfied and no substantive issues remaining pending. The total amount paid across all stages stood at approximately ₹9,800 crore (US$1.0 billion), comprising ₹3,507 crore (US$360 million) paid directly to the consortium of lender banks, ₹1,192 crore (US$120 million) realised through IBC liquidation mechanisms, and ₹5,111 crore (US$530 million) deposited with the Supreme Court registry. This cumulative figure represents approximately 180 percent which is ₹9,800 crore (US$1.0 billion) of the original CBI FIR reference amount of ₹5,383 crore (US$560 million).

Later, the court directed that the FIR registered and all investigations by CBI, ED, attachments under PMLA, proceedings under the Fugitive Economic Offenders Act, 2018, SFIO proceedings pertaining to black money, and income tax proceedings be quashed. The investigating agencies were further directed to communicate the decision regarding closure of all proceedings at all levels including at airports and to the Ministry of External Affairs (India).

As a parallel development, on 4 April 2026, a Delhi district court (Tis Hazari) passed a 47-page ex parte ad-interim injunction which restrained Google LLC, Meta Platforms, media houses and other parties from publishing or circulating content relating to the plaintiff and his family concerning the Sterling Biotech case, and directed them to de-index flagged URLs within 36 hours, finding terms such as “fugitives”, “bank fraud”, “siphoning public money”, “defrauded banks” and “money laundering” prima facie defamatory after the Supreme Court quashed all proceedings. Journalist Sucheta Dalal, through her publication Moneylife, has since challenged the order as overly broad and violative of free speech; a District Judge heard the matter on 13 April 2026, issued notices to Manoj Sandesara, Google and Meta, and posted the case for next hearing on 29 April 2026.
