= Prevention of Corruption Act, 1988 =

1988 act of the Parliament of India

Parliament of India
- Long title: An Act to consolidate and amend the law relating to the prevention of corruption and for matters connected therewith.
- Citation: Act No. 49 of 1988
- Territorial extent: The whole of India Applies also to all citizens of India outside India.
- Enacted by: Parliament of India
- Signed by: President
- Signed: 9 September 1988
- Commenced: 9 September 1988

Repeals
- Prevention of Corruption Act, 1947 (2 of 1947); Prevention of Corruption Act, 1947 (2 of 1947)

Amended by
- Repealing and Amending Act, 2001(30 of 2001); Lokpal and Lokayuktas Act, 2013 (1 of 2014); Prevention of Corruption (Amendment) Act, 2018 (16 of 2018); Jammu and Kashmir Reorganisation Act, 2019 (34 of 2019)
- Status: In force (amended)

The Prevention of Corruption Act, 1988 (No. 49 of 1988) is an Act of the Parliament of India enacted to combat corruption in government agencies and public sector businesses in India.

== Provisions ==
The act consists of 31 sections spread across 5 chapters.

=== Chapter I: Preliminary ===
This chapter details the title, territorial extent and basic definitions under the law, etc. Two of the main definitions are of "public servant" and "undue advantage". Following are some sections in the other four chapters:

=== Chapter II: Appointment of Special Judges ===
==== Section 3: Appointment of special Judges ====
Power To Appoint Special Judges: The Central and the State Government is empowered to appoint Special Judges by placing a Notification in the Official Gazette, to try the following offences:

- Any offence punishable under this Act.
- Any conspiracy to commit or any attempt to commit or any abetment of any of the offences specified under the Act.

The qualification for the Special Judge is that he should be or should have been a Session Judge or an Additional Session Judge or Assistant Session Judge under the Code of Criminal Procedure, 1973

==== Section 4: Cases triable by special Judges ====
The offences punishable under this act can be tried by special Judges only. When trying any case, the special Judge is empowered to try any offence other than an offence punishable under this act, with which the accused may be charged at the same trial. It is recommended that the special Judge should hold the trial daily.

Case Trial By Special Judges: Every offence mentioned in Section 3(1)shall be tried by the Special Judge for the area within which it was committed. When trying any case, a Special Judge may also try any offence other than what is specified in S. 3, which the accused may be, under Cr.P.C. be charged at the same trial. The Special Judge has to hold the trial of an offence on day-to-day basis. However, while complying with foretasted, it is to be seen that the Cr.P.C. is not bifurcated.

==== Section 5: Procedure and powers of special Judge ====
The following are the powers of the Special Judge: He may take cognizance of the offences without the accused being commissioned to him for trial. In trying the accused persons, shall follow the procedure prescribed by the Cr.P.C. for the trial of warrant cases by Magistrate. he may with a view to obtain the evidence of any person supposed to have been directly or indirectly concerned in or privy to an offence, tender pardon to such person provided that he would make full and true disclosure of the whole circumstances within his knowledge or in respect to any person related to the offence.

Except as for S. 2(1), the provisions of Cr.P.C. shall apply to the proceedings before a Special Judge. Hence, the court of the Special Judge shall be deemed to be a Court of Session and the person conducting a prosecution before a Special Judge shall be deemed to be a public prosecutor. The provisions of secs. 326 and 475 of the Cr.P.C. shall apply to the proceedings before a Special Judge and for purpose of the said provisions, a Special Judge shall be deemed to be a magistrate.

A Special Judge may pass a sentence authorized by law for the punishment of the offence of which a person is convicted. A Special Judge, while trying any offence punishable under the Act, shall exercise all powers and functions exercised by a District Judge under the Criminal Law Amendment Ordinance, 1944.

Power to try summarily: Where a Special Judge tries any offence specified in Sec. 3(1), alleged to have been committed by a public servant in relation to the contravention of any special order referred to in Sec.12-A(1) of the Essential Commodities Act, 1955 or all orders referred to in sub-section (2)(a) of that section then the special judge shall try the offence in a summarily way and the provisions of s. 262 to 265 (both inclusive) of the said code shall as far as may be apply to such trial. Provided that in the case of any conviction in a summary trial under this section this shall be lawful for the Special Judge to pass a sentence of imprisonment for a term not exceeding one year. However, when at the commencement of or in the course of a summary trial it appears to the Special Judge that the nature of the case is such that a sentence of imprisonment for a term exceeding one year may have to be passed or it is undesirable to try the case summarily, the Special judge shall record all order to that effect and thereafter recall any witnesses who may have been examined and proceed to hear and re-hear the case in accordance with the procedure prescribed by the said code for the trial of warrant cases by Magistrates. Moreover, there shall be no appeal by a convicted person in any case tried summarily under this section in which the Special Judge passes a sentence of imprisonment not exceeding one month and of fine not exceeding Rs. 2000.

=== Chapter III: Offences and penalties ===
The following are the offences under the PCA along with their punishments:- Obtaining an undue advantage, with the intention to perform or cause performance of public duty improperly or dishonestly, etc., and if the public servant is found guilty, he shall be punishable with imprisonment which shall be not less than 3 years but which may extend to 7 years and shall also be liable to fine.

- Taking gratification in order to influence public servant, by corrupt or illegal means, shall be punishable with imprisonment for a term which shall be not less than three year but which may extend to seven years and shall also be liable to fine.
- Taking gratification, for exercise of personal influence with public servant shall be punishable with imprisonment for a term which shall be not less than six months but which may extend to five years and shall also be liable to fine.
- Abetment by public servant of offences defined in Section 8 or 9, shall be punishable with imprisonment for a term which shall be not less than six months but which may extend to five years and shall also be liable to fine.
- Public servant obtaining valuable thing without consideration from person concerned in proceeding or business transacted by such public servant, shall be punishable with imprisonment for a term which shall be not less than six months but which may extend to five years and shall also be liable to fine.
- Punishment for abetment of offences defined in Section 7 or 11 shall be punishable with imprisonment for a term which shall be not less than six months but which may extend to five years and shall also be liable to fine.
- Any public servant, who commits criminal misconduct shall be punishable with imprisonment for a term which shall be not less than one year but which may extend to 7 years and shall also be liable to fine.
- Habitual committing of offence under Section 8, 9 and 12 shall be punishable with imprisonment for a term which shall be not less than two years but which may extend to 7 years and shall also be liable to fine.
- Prevention to the Corruption Act considers non-performance of public duty as an offence. Thus, non-performance of duty by public servants for which they are morally, legally and constitutionally mandated to do, is a form of corruption.

=== Chapter IV: Investigation ===
Investigation shall be done by a police officer not below the rank of:

- In case of Delhi Special Police Establishment, of an Inspector of Police.
- In metropolitan areas, of an Assistant Commissioner of Police.
- Elsewhere, of a Deputy Superintendent of Police or an officer of equivalent rank shall investigate any offence punishable under this Act without the order of a Metropolitan Magistrate or a magistrate of first class, or make any arrest therefore without a warrant.

If a police officer not below the rank of an Inspector of Police is authorized by the State of Government in this behalf by general or special order, he may investigate such offence without the order of a Metropolitan Magistrate or Magistrate of First class or make arrest therefor without a warrant.

Provided further that an offence referred to sec 13.1.e shall not be investigated without the order of a police officer not below the rank of a Superintendent of Police. Any such investigation without the order of a SP or above rank will be dismissed.

== Amendment Act 2018 ==
As the Prevention of Corruption Act saw limited success in preventing corruption in Government departments and prosecuting and punishing public servants involved in corrupt practices, an amendment was enactedand brought into force on 26 July 2018. The Amendment Act attempted to bring the Prevention of Corruption Act in line with United Nations Convention against Corruption 2005, which was ratified by India in 2011.

=== Highlights of the Amendment ===
==== (i) Definition of Undue Advantage ====
The terms “gratification other than legal remuneration” and “valuable thing” are being replaced by the term “undue advantage”. The bill, therefore, redefines the offense of accepting bribes as “obtains or accepts or attempts to obtain from any person an undue advantage, intending that in consequence a public duty would be performed improperly or dishonestly, either by himself or by another public servant is guilty of offense under section 7 and shall be imprisoned for a term of 3 to 7 years.

==== (ii) Offering of Bribes by Person/Commercial Organization ====
In addition to treating bribe-giving as an offense, section 9 specifically provides for an offense by a commercial organization if any person associated with the commercial organization gives or promises to give any undue advantage to a public servant to obtain or retain business or an advantage in conduct of business. Such a person/commercial organization shall be punishable with a fine, quantum of which is not prescribed in the act.

==== (iii) Redefining Criminal Misconduct ====
The offense of criminal misconduct specified in section 13 of the Prevention of Corruption Act, is being substituted by a new section restricting the criminal misconduct to dishonest or fraudulent misappropriation of any property entrusted to the public servant or if the public servant intentionally enriches himself illicitly during the period of his office. Thus the scope of criminal misconduct has been narrowed in the amendment and the threshold to establish the offense has been increased.

==== (iv) Prior Sanction of Appropriate Government for Investigation and Prosecution ====
The amendment extends the protection of requirement of prior approval to investigation prior to prosecution. Under the new Section 17A, except when a public official is caught ‘redhanded', the police cannot begin a probe, without the approval of the relevant authority, of any public official. Earlier, this was limited to protecting joint secretaries and above. The amendment has created additional hurdles for investigation and prosecution. The amendment provides for the requirement to obtain prior sanction from appropriate Government to initiate a probe on serving as well as former public servants. While the intent was to prevent victimisation of honest officers, the amendment seemingly strengthens the shield available to officials accused of corruption.

==== (v) Forfeiture of Property ====
The new Section 18A also introduces a provision for special courts to confiscate and attach the property acquired through corrupt practices.

==== (vi) Time Frame for Trial ====
To ensure speedy justice, the Amendment Act now prescribes that the courts shall endeavor to complete the trial within 2 (two) years. This period can be extended by 6 (six) months at a time and up to a maximum of 4 (four) years in aggregate subject to proper reasons for the same being recorded.

==== (vii) Enhancement of Punishment ====
Punishment has been increased from a minimum imprisonment term of 6 (six) months to 3 (three) years, and from a maximum of 5 (five) years to 7 (seven) years, with or without fine.

== Enforcement ==
The Prevention of Corruption Act is enforced mainly by the Central Bureau of Investigation (CBI) at the central level and Vigilance Commission / Anti-Corruption Bureaus (ACBs) at the state level. In some states, the enforcement is carried out by the Lokayukta Police, which is the investigation wing of the Lokayukta. Cases are tried in special courts to ensure speedy trials. The Central Vigilance Commission (CVC) supervises corruption investigations involving central government officials.

Prosecution of serving public servants requires prior government sanction, which has been criticized for causing delays. Despite a strong legal framework, enforcement faces challenges such as procedural delays, limited resources, and political interference.

The Kerala High Court has held that the State Anti-Corruption Bureau (ACB), being a specially constituted agency to investigate bribery, corruption, and misconduct under the Prevention of Corruption Act, is fully empowered to investigate corruption offenses occurring within the state, whether committed by Central Government employees or State Government employees.

== Prominent cases ==
=== 2G Spectrum Case ===
The telecom spectrum, which is allotted to private players through the spectrum auction, was allotted by the UPA government at throwaway prices to companies through corrupt and illegal means. On 21 December 2017, the special court in New Delhi after thorough examination of the case and hearing what the CBI had to say, acquitted all accused in the 2G spectrum case including prime accused A Raja and Kanimozhi. The court ruled that this case was baseless.

=== Ketan Desai ===
The CBI recently arrested the Medical Council of India's former president Ketan Desai and three others under this act, for allegedly accepting a bribe to permit Patiala-based Gyan Sagar Medical College to recruit a fresh batch of students without having an adequate infrastructure.

== See also ==
- The Lokpal Bill, 2011
- Jan Lokpal Bill
- Indian political scandals
- Corruption Perceptions Index
- Corruption in Mumbai
- Rent seeking
- Lok Ayukta
- List of acts of the Parliament of India
