= 2025 India cough syrup crisis =

Cough syrup crisis in India

In late 2025, India experienced a deadly outbreak of cough syrup poisoning that primarily struck children in the central state of Madhya Pradesh and the neighbouring state of Rajasthan. Dozens of young children fell ill and many died after taking locally sold cough medicines. Investigations showed that at least one of the implicated syrups, Coldrif, produced by Sresan Pharmaceuticals, contained extremely high levels of the industrial solvent diethylene glycol (DEG). Another incident in Rajasthan involved a government-distributed cough syrup containing the active ingredient dextromethorphan hydrobromide made by Kayson Pharma. The World Health Organization also issued global alerts about the contaminated syrups.

== Background ==
India is a leading global drug producer, but the quality of some locally marketed medicines has been questioned after previous tragedies. In 2022–2023, dozens of children in Uzbekistan, the Gambia and Cameroon died after taking Indian-made syrups contaminated with ethylene glycol or diethylene glycol. For example, 18 children in Uzbekistan died after ingesting Dok-1 Max, and WHO later found toxic glycols in syrups from India’s Marion Biotech. Similarly, a WHO investigation attributed dozens of child deaths in the Gambia to four Indian cough syrups contaminated with ethylene glycol or diethylene glycol. After those incidents, India tightened export controls, but domestic oversight gaps remained a concern.

== Outbreak ==
=== Madhya Pradesh ===
The first fatalities emerged in early October 2025 in Chhindwara district of Madhya Pradesh. Local health officials reported that infants and toddlers with common cold symptoms rapidly developed severe dehydration and acute kidney injury after receiving a cough syrup. By mid-October, at least 17 children under age five from Chhindwara and nearby areas had died of renal failure after consuming the syrup. A state government investigation traced all the cases to Coldrif syrup, manufactured by Sresan pharmaceuticals in Tamil Nadu. The Madhya Pradesh government banned Coldrif on 2 October 2025, after its laboratory tests confirmed diethylene glycol contamination. The death toll continued to rise, and on 15 October, officials reported that 24 children (mostly under five) had died in connection with Coldrif poisoning, and several more were hospitalized. In these cases, children initially had symptoms of mild respiratory illness but then suffered persistent vomiting, abdominal pain and difficulty urinating.

=== Rajasthan ===
In early October, three children (aged 2–5) died in the districts of Sikar and Bharatpur after taking a government-dispensed cough syrup. The offending product was a generic cough syrup containing dextromethorphan hydrobromide, manufactured by Kayson Pharma in Jaipur. Unlike the Madhya Pradesh cases, this syrup did not test positive for diethylene glycol (the active ingredient dextromethorphan is a standard cough suppressant), but the timing of the deaths prompted authorities to suspect contamination or overdose. The Rajasthan government immediately suspended distribution of all Kayson Pharma medicines and stopped dispensing any cough syrups containing dextromethorphan.

== Contaminated syrups ==
The outbreak in Madhya Pradesh was primarily linked to Coldrif, produced by Sresan Pharmaceuticals, which contained approximately 48.6% diethylene glycol (DEG), far exceeding permissible limits and causing multiple child fatalities. Two additional syrups, Respifresh TR and ReLife, manufactured in Gujarat—also tested positive for DEG but were not associated with reported deaths. In Rajasthan, a separate incident involved a dextromethorphan hydrobromide syrup produced by Kayson Pharma, which was implicated in child deaths and hospitalizations due to improper use and suspected contamination.

== Investigation and WHO alert ==
Indian health authorities, in coordination with international agencies, initiated urgent investigations in early October 2025. The Central Drugs Standard Control Organisation (CDSCO) and state regulators collected numerous samples of cough syrups, antipyretics, and antibiotics from six states to test for contamination. Most randomly sampled syrups from general pharmacies tested negative for diethylene glycol (DEG), indicating that the problem was confined to specific batches. Following requests from Madhya Pradesh authorities, Tamil Nadu drug inspectors obtained samples of Coldrif directly from the Sresan Pharma factory; tests released on 3 October confirmed extremely high levels of DEG. The Sresan pharma plant was subsequently sealed, with inspectors reporting unsafe and abandoned conditions on site.

A multi-disciplinary team—including CDSCO, ICMR, AIIMS Nagpur, and NEERI—began analyzing clinical data and drug samples to identify the source of contamination. Police filed a criminal complaint, naming Sresan’s owner, G. Ranganathan, in a manslaughter case, and arrested a prescribing doctor, Praveen Soni, for negligent prescribing. The charge sheet cited violations of the Drugs & Cosmetics Act, including adulteration of drugs and culpable homicide not amounting to murder.

Internationally, the World Health Organization (WHO) was notified on 8 October and issued a Medical Product Alert on 13 October, confirming that specific batches of Coldrif, Respifresh TR, and ReLife contained toxic DEG. The alert noted that Indian authorities had ordered immediate production halts and product recalls. WHO advised healthcare professionals worldwide to report any cases involving these products and to avoid their use in children. The U.S. Food and Drug Administration (FDA) reported that none of the contaminated syrups had been exported to the United States but recommended vigilance in other markets.

== Government actions ==
The Tamil Nadu state drug control department cancelled all manufacturing licenses of Sresan Pharma. The company’s owner was formally arrested and will face life imprisonment if convicted. Production of all medicines at Sresan’s facility was halted, and a nationwide ban on Coldrif was enforced. In Gujarat, authorities recalled Respifresh TR and ReLife and ordered the manufacturers to suspend production of all drugs.

In Rajasthan, the state government suspended the distribution of all Kayson Pharma products under its free medicine scheme and also suspended the state drug controller. An expert committee was appointed to investigate the deaths, and the prescribing doctor involved in the Sikar cases was suspended. Across India, health ministries reissued guidelines recommending that cough and cold medicines be administered only to children over five years of age and avoided in infants under two unless absolutely necessary. Warning labels for pediatric safety were mandated, and the Directorate General of Health Services advised physicians to exercise careful clinical evaluation and strict dosing when prescribing syrups to older children.

In addition to bans and arrests, regulatory agencies carried out broader crackdowns. The Enforcement Directorate conducted raids on Sresan Pharma headquarters in connection with alleged financial irregularities.
