= Railway bribery scam =

Indian Railway Minister Pawan Kumar Bansal's nephew, Vijay Singla, was arrested in Chandigarh on 3 May 2013 by sleuths of India's Central Bureau of Investigation for allegedly accepting a bribe of 9 million (9,000,000) rupees from Narayana Rao Manjunath on behalf of Mahesh Kumar, a member of the Indian Railway Board, in exchange for getting a higher ranking position on the Railway Board. It was reported that Kumar had superseded two seniors to be promoted to the Indian Railway Board, although this was denied by the railway ministry, but wanted to be another member who dealt with more contracts.

== Persons Involved ==
- Vijay Singla - Nephew of railway minister Pawan Kumar Bansal
- Mahesh Kumar: Member Railway Board
- Sandeep Goyal (Singla's Friend) - Owner of Pyramid Electronics
- Narayana Rao Manjunath : MD of G.G Tronics
- Rahul Yadav: Associate of Manjunath
- Samir Sandhir
- Sushil Daga
- Murali: MD of Venkateshwara rail nirman and uncle of Narayan to manjunath( NR manjunath's mother's younger brother)
- Venugopal(Employee of NrayanaRao Manjunath)

== After-effects ==
There were demands for the resignation of railway minister Pawan Kumar Bansal. The minister allegedly involved in the scam was made to resign from his post on 10 May 2013, after a long meeting held at Prime Minister's house. On the very same day Ashwani Kumar, the minister of Law and Order, also had to resign due to allegations on him of viewing the CBI report on Coal Scam even when the Supreme court of India had ordered not to show the report.

== Response ==
- Indian National Congress: Though had several meeting over the issue, though denied any the resignation of the minister.
- Bhartiya Janta Party: BJP asked that the minister be sacked and the party organized huge protests on this issue.

== Ministers' role ==
Members of the Railway Board are appointed by the Appointments Committee of Cabinet; although they usually agree with the recommendations of the minister.

== Nephew's link with the minister ==
Singla acquired businesses with diversified interests in real estate, cement, packaging, infrastructure and steel manufacturing over the last decade, thanks to his proximity to the minister. Many of these companies soon began flourishing after Bansal won the 1991 elections from Chandigarh. Singla often facilitated meeting of captains of industry with the minister at his industrial complex.

== Related ==
- Corruption in India
