= Ringing Bells Private Limited =

Indian company

Ringing Bells company
- Company type: Private
- Industry: Telecommunications, Consumer electronics
- Founded: 16 September 2015; 10 years ago in Noida, Uttar Pradesh, India
- Founders: Mohit Goel (Managing Director)
- Headquarters: Noida, Uttar Pradesh, India
- Area served: India
- Key people: Mohit Goel (Managing director) Ashok Chaddha (President)
- Products: Mobile phones Smartphones; LEDs; Accessories
- Website: Ringing Bells (defunct)

Ringing Bells Private Limited was a company based in Noida (India), registered on 16 September 2015. It was later described as a "ponzi scheme".

== Freedom 251 ==
The company attracted attention when it announced the Freedom 251, a 3G-based smartphone, at a price of ₹ 251 which makes it the world's cheapest smartphone. Ringing Bells MD, Mohit Goel, claimed on 16 December 2016 that the company has already delivered 70,000 phones and the remaining phones would be delivered soon.

== Controversies ==
=== Scam allegations ===
There are suggestions that the Freedom 251 sale is a scam. It is alleged that the phone looks like a Chinese phone with the original brand label covered with whitener. The icons shown on screen shots are copied from Apple's iPhone. MP Kirit Somaiya describes the offer as a "huge scam" and has asked the government of Uttar Pradesh to investigate.

As a result of these concerns, the payment gateway facilitator PayUBiz decided to withhold payment to Ringing Bells until the items were dispatched. In response, Ringing Bells stated that they would accept payment by cash-on-delivery for those customers who had placed orders but had been unable to make payment through the payment gateway before the offer closed.

Ringing Bells has also been accused of fraud and non-payment of dues by its customer services provider Cyfuture.

=== Arrest of Mohit Goel ===
Goel was detained on 24 February 2017 over fraud allegations, after the owner of Ghaziabad-based Ayam Enterprises filed an FIR alleging that Ringing Bells "defrauded" it of Rs. 16 lakhs. Mohit Goel has been arrested on allegations of fraud. Several analysts have described the phone as a "ponzi scheme". Goel was again arrested by the Delhi Police on 10 June 2018 for allegedly extorting money in lieu of settling a rape case.
