= S. K. Sahni =

Indian retired lieutenant general

S.K. Sahni used to be a lieutenant general in the Indian Army, but he retired in 2006. In 2011, a military court in Jalandhar found him guilty of trying to cheat. This was because he provided expired food to Indian Army soldiers in Jammu and Kashmir. He was sentenced to jail because of this. This was the first instance when a retired Indian Army lieutenant general was jailed by a court martial.
