= Pearls Group =

Indian company involved in ponzi scheme

The Pearls Group was an Indian group of companies founded by Nirmal Singh Bhangoo involved in ponzi scheme.

Mr. Bhangoo previously worked for Peerless Group before he founded his own company.

One company called Guruvant Agro-Tech Ltd was founded in Jaipur in 1996, it was rebranded in 2011. Punjab Agro Company Limited (PACL) mobilised funds since 1997.

The group's Ponzi scheme that other directors from the company while Mr. Bhangoo was on bed rest after his kidney transplant used funds from new investors in order to repay earlier investors and giving commission to agents for recruiting new investors.

Australian cricketer Bret Lee was hired by the company as the brand ambassador while Indian cricketers such as Harbhajan Singh and Yuvraj Singh received gifts from the company.

The company collapsed in 2014 after Indian agency Central Bureau of Investigation raided the company's operations and uncovered the scam of 45,000 crores.

Bhangoo was jailed in 2016. He died on 26 August, 2024. After his death, Bhangoo's daughter announced the money will be returned to investors.

As of 2024, only 21 lakh out of 5.5 crore investors were refunded with their money.
