= Madhya Pradesh Scholarship scam =

In the year 2013, an investigation into a minor complaint of misappropriation of funds disbursed under the scholarship scheme meant for tribal students, exposed a multi-crore scam spanning across Madhya Pradesh, India. The initial investigation revealed that huge amount of money was illegally siphoned off and thereafter, a special team was constituted to crack down on those involved. The tribal welfare department headed by Chief Minister Shivraj Singh Chouhan came under the Lokayukta probe.

== Scam ==
The Madhya Pradesh Lokayukta took cognizance of the matter of a complaint filed in Jabalpur and initiated the investigations. The inquiry revealed that an institute pocketed Rs. 1.5 crore by claiming to admit around 180 students. The institute forged the documents to claim the scholarship meant for the students. This revelation was only a tip of an iceberg and it was found that many political people and officials of tribal welfare department were involved in the scam. They were jointly operating hundreds of fake institutes to siphon off the scholarship money. In one of the cases, the scholarship amount was availed for same set of students from two different districts of the state.

During the course of investigations, it was found that even though the candidates had been admitted in the colleges, the college authorities could not product the admission forms. Also, the tribal welfare department had released scholarships in one installment; the college had given it in two installments so as to earn the interest on the amount for a year.

The Madhya Pradesh Lokayukta revealed that the illegal operation was going on since last five years.

== Modus Operandi ==
The officials operated in the following manner:

- Inflated the number of admissions.
- A single student was given admission in multiple institutes.

The probe revealed that the officials in connivance with the bank staff and the college authorities had withdrawn the amount through forgery. Instead of transferring the money through internet banking, college authorities in collusion with government officials deposited it in accounts opened in the name of fictitious persons.

== Aftermath ==
Initially, a senior tribal development department official was booked along with twenty three other people involved in the scam. The cases were registered against J P Yadav, Assistant Commissioner in Tribal Development Department, Ranjana Singh, District Coordinator in Schedule Tribe Welfare Department and three other government employees under section 420 (offences relating to cheating and dishonestly inducing delivery of property) and Prevention of Corruption Act. The cases were also registered against four bank officials and college authorities.

Eighteen paramedical colleges were blacklisted by Madhya Pradesh tribal development department. More than sixteen cases were registered against these colleges.

Students of engineering college in Jabalpur came out in protest against the scam and demanded a CBI probe into it.

On July 17, 2015, Jabalpur bench of Madhya Pradesh High Court sent a notice to Union Government seeking response on should Central Bureau of Investigation take over investigation of this scam.
