= Ashwani Kumar (politician) =

Indian politician

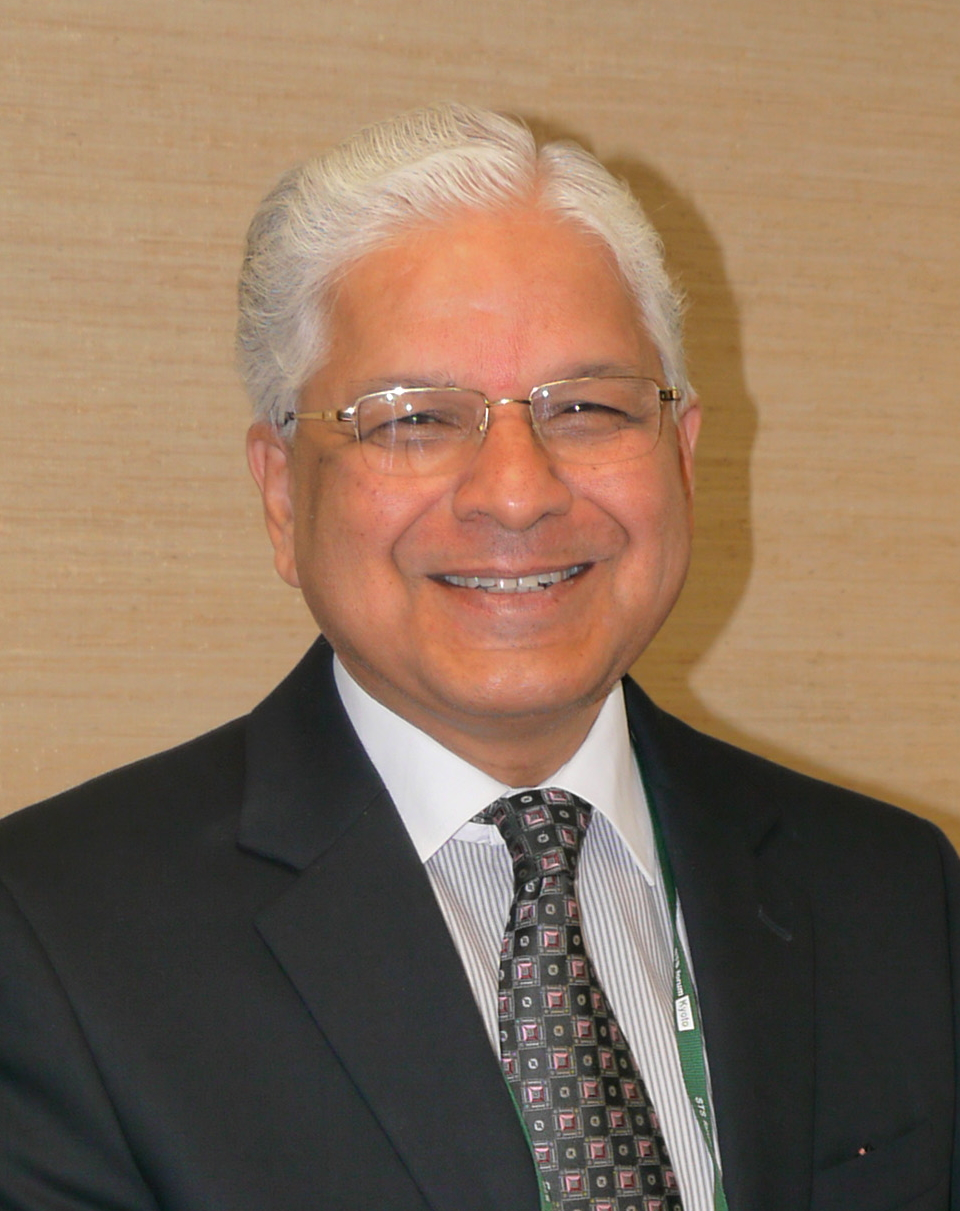

Member of Parliament, Rajya Sabha
- In office 2002–2016
- Constituency: Punjab

Minister of Law and Justice
- In office 28 October 2012 – 10 May 2013
- Prime Minister: Manmohan Singh
- Preceded by: Salman Khurshid
- Succeeded by: Kapil Sibal

Additional Solicitor General of India
- In office 1991–1991

Personal details
- Born: 26 October 1952 (age 73) Delhi, India
- Party: Indian National Congress (till February 2022)
- Spouse: Madhu Kumar (1975–2012)
- Children: 2
- Education: St. Stephen's College, Delhi, Faculty of Law, Jawaharlal Nehru University
- Profession: Lawyer, Politician
- Website: Official website

Ashwani Kumar (born 26 October 1952) is an Indian politician and lawyer who formerly served as Member of Parliament, Rajya Sabha representing the state of Punjab. He formerly served as Union Minister of Law and Justice and Union Minister of State in the Department of Industrial Policy and Promotion and Ministry of Commerce and Industry.

In 1991, at the age of 37, he was appointed one of the youngest Additional Solicitors General of India. He has served as Indian National Congress party's National Spokesperson and Chairman of its Vichar Vibhag. As a legal counsel, he has argued important cases before the Supreme Court of India, including the Bhopal Gas Tragedy case, and has also represented major corporations in international arbitrations. He has been a member of the Rajya Sabha since 2002.

He resigned from the Indian National Congress on 15 February 2022.

== Early life and education ==
Born in Delhi on 26 October 1952, Ashwani Kumar graduated from St. Stephen's College, Delhi. Thereafter, he pursued law and earned Bachelor of Laws from Faculty of Law, University of Delhi, and a Master of Philosophy from Jawaharlal Nehru University, New Delhi.

In 2004, he was awarded honorary doctorate in law from Panjab University.

== Career ==
He has been the Additional Solicitor General of India. He is engaged in the advocacy of human rights issues in and out of court.

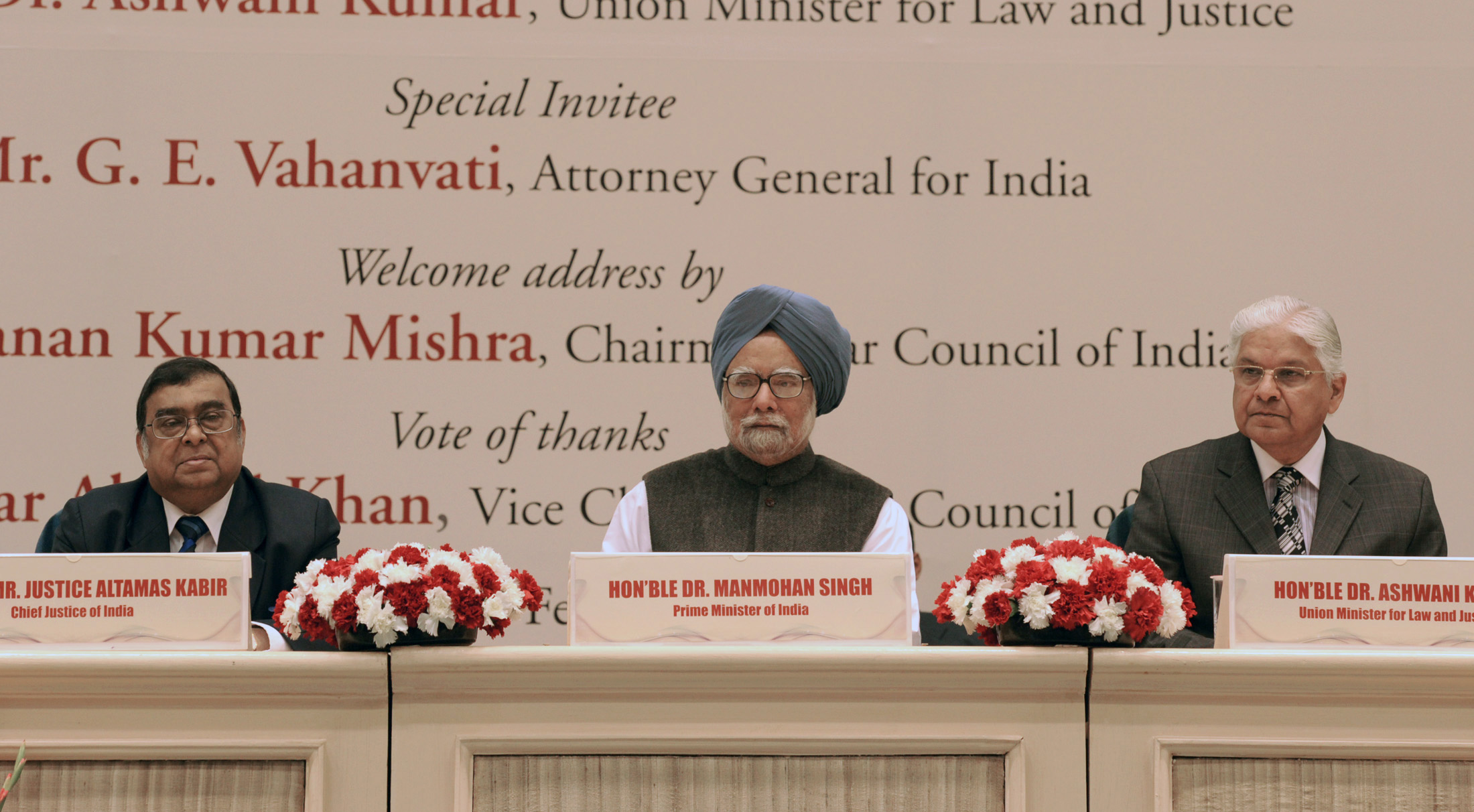
Kumar with former Prime Minister Manmohan Singh in 2013

=== Ministerial responsibilities ===
Ashwani Kumar was the Minister of Law and Justice from 28 October 2012 to 11 May 2013. From 19 January 2011 to 11 May 2013, he was the Minister of State in the Ministry of Planning; Ministry of Science and Technology; and Ministry of Earth Sciences. He was the Minister of State for Parliamentary Affairs from January to July 2011.

=== Special Envoy to Japan ===
In 2013, Prime Minister Manmohan Singh appointed him as his Special Envoy "to maintain the momentum of high-level exchanges with Japan" and prepare for the upcoming visit of Japan's Emperor and the Empress to India.

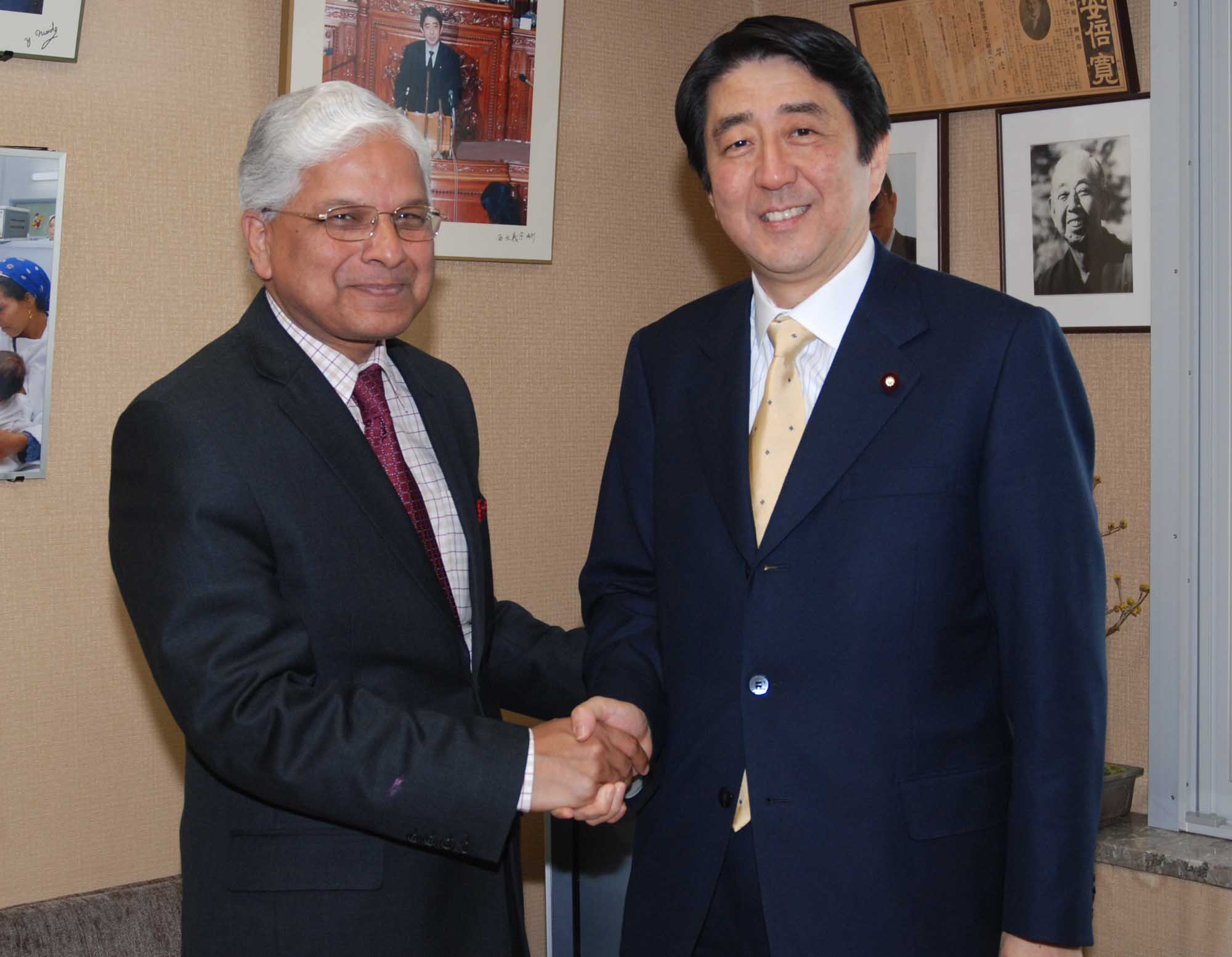
Ashwani Kumar with Shinzo Abe in 2008

=== Academia ===
In 2011, Kumar was the keynote speaker at the 8th Annual Meeting of the Science and Technology Forum (STS) at Kyoto, Japan. He was a guest speaker at The Kennedy School of Government at Harvard University in 2008. He was a visiting scholar at CSIS, Washington in 2004. In addition to writing a number of scholarly articles on law, economic reforms, elections, democracy and international affairs, Kumar has also authored a book titled Law, Ideas and Ideology in Politics; Perspectives of an Activist in 2003.

In 2012, Kumar was the keynote speaker at the Harvard Club, New York City on "The Legal Architecture for consolidating the economic reform process in India" and was also a guest lecturer at MIT. In 2013, he was a speaker at the Aix Le Cercle des economists in Aix-en-Provence, France, and was a distinguished fellow at Trinity College, Dublin in 2016.

Kumar's second book, Hope in a Challenged Democracy - an Indian Narrative, was published in 2017.

== Membership of committees and key positions held ==
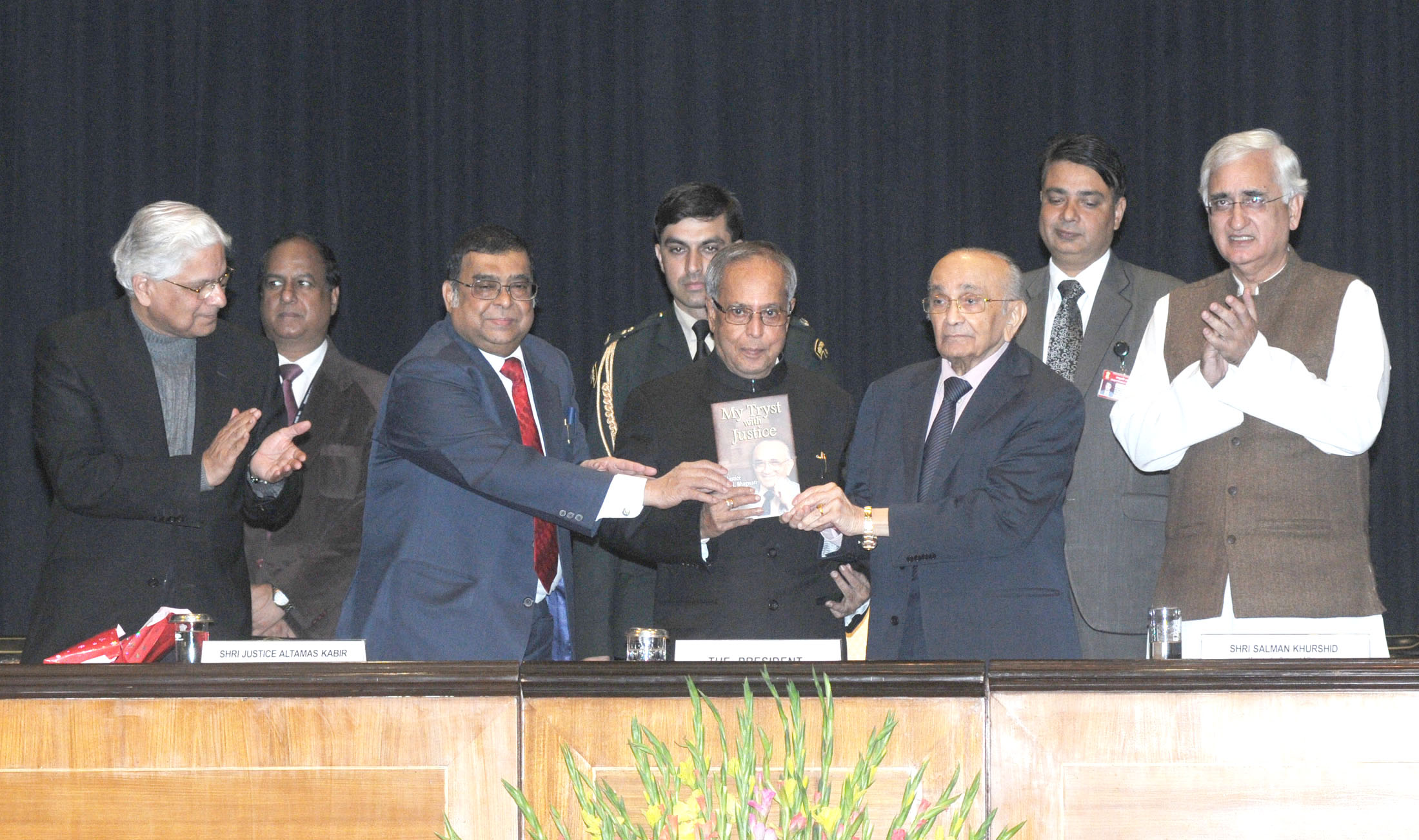
Kumar with the President of India in 2012

Kumar was appointed Member of Standing Committee of Parliament on External Affairs in 2009. He also served as the chairman of the Select Committee of Rajya Sabha for "The Prevention of Torture Bill", 2010. He was a member of the Standing Committee of Parliament on Defense and a member of the Public Accounts Committee in 2013. In 2014, Kumar was appointed a member of the Co-ordination Committee of the INC in Rajya Sabha and a member of the Parliamentary Affairs Committee of the INC. Kumar has also been a member of the Empowered Sub-Committee of the High Level Committee on Manufacturing and the Standing Committee on Commerce. He has chaired the Parliamentary Standing Committee on Science and Technology, Environment and Forests. In January 2015, Kumar was nominated as a Member of the General Purposes Committee of Rajya Sabha. He was also nominated as a Member of the Consultative Committee for the Ministry of Defence in January 2015.

In 2014, Kumar was appointed a Member of the National Literacy Mission. He was a Member of the Indian Ministerial delegation for the 3rd Indo-US Strategic Dialogue and the 1st Indo-Japan Economic Dialogue held in New Delhi. Kumar was the founder president of the Indo-French Parliamentary Friendship Group constituted by the Speaker of Lok Sabha in 2003.

In November 2017, Kumar was appointed a Distinguished Fellow with the Global Federation of Competitiveness Council.

== Nominations ==
In 2013, Kumar was nominated to represent India at the United Nations General Assembly Session in New York City and made an address there. He also represented India at the Summer Davos meeting of the World Economic Forum's Annual Meeting of the New Champions (2011) in Dalian, People's Republic of China.

== Coalgate draft report controversy ==
Kumar was appointed to vet a draft report of Ranjit Sinha, the director of the CBI, in 2013. Submitted to the Supreme Court of India, this concerned the Indian coal allocation scam and led to opposition claims that the autonomy of the CBI was undermined. They demanded Kumar's resignation from the cabinet, which happened on 10 May 2013. Kumar said that he resigned only to ensure that the functioning of Parliament was not stalled and noted that the Supreme Court had not made any adverse comments against him.

== Personal life ==
He married Madhu on 30 November 1975, with whom he had a son and daughter.

== Publications ==
Among Kumar's publications are:

=== Books ===
- Ehsas-O-Izhar: An Anthology of Urdu Poetry (Publisher: Nyogi Books)The HinduJagran
- Hope in a Challenged Democracy: An Indian Narrative (Publisher: Wisdom Tree; ISBN 978-8183284943)
- Law, Ideas and Ideology in Politics: Perspectives of an Activist (Publisher: HarAnand Publications; ISBN 978-8124109250)

== Honours ==
- Order of the Rising Sun, 1st Class, Grand Cordon (2017)

Political offices
Preceded by Salman Khurshid	Minister of Law and Justice; 2012–2013	Succeeded by Kapil Sibal
