= Uttar Pradesh NRHM scam =

Corruption scandal in Uttar Pradesh, India

Uttar Pradesh NRHM Scam is an alleged corruption scandal in the Indian state of Uttar Pradesh, in which top politicians and bureaucrats are alleged to have siphoned off a massive sum estimated at ₹100 billion (US$1.0 billion) from the National Rural Health Mission (NRHM), a central government program meant to improve health care delivery in rural areas. At least five people are said to have been murdered in an attempt to coverup large-scale irregularities. Several former ministers of then ruling party, Bahujan Samaj Party have been investigated by the Central Bureau of Investigation

The NRHM scam came to light after two Chief Medical Officers (the top health functionary of the district) were successively murdered in wealthier localities of the state capital, Lucknow. Dr. Vinod Arya (Oct 2010) and Dr. B. P. Singh (April 2011) were shot dead in broad daylight outside their homes by motorcycle assassins, using the same weapon. Deputy-CMO Y.S. Sachan, who is thought to have had a role in the murders, was arrested, but died mysteriously while in custody. Subsequently, three other functionaries who were under investigation have also been murdered or died under suspicious circumstances. The CBI referred the case to T D Dogra of AIIMS New Delhi, he examined the scene of occurrence and opined in favour of Suicide.

In Feb 2012, Prime Minister Manmohan Singh himself accused the Mayawati government of misusing NRHM funds.

== People accused of involvement ==
On 3 April 2012 Central Bureau of Investigation (CBI) filed its first chargesheet against PK Jain (former general manager of Construction and Design Services), Subhash Chaudhari (Project Manager), Kataar Singh (Resident Engineer), BN Ram (Project Engineer), JK Singh (Accountant), Neelprabha Chaudhari (wife of Mr. Subhash Chaudhari) (managing director of a Private Firm) and R K Singh (managing director of a private firm) CBI has alleged that these accused caused a loss of ₹54.6 million (US$570,000) while carrying out the upgrading work of 134 district hospitals. To carry out the upgrade of 134 district hospitals ₹134 million (US$1.4 million) was granted to Construction and Design Services, a unit of UP Jal Nigam, which outsourced the job to a Ghaziabad-based firm which had obtained the tender on the basis of bogus and forged documents. As per CBI, the material used in up-gradation was sub-standard and thus caused heavy losses to the exchequer. On 4 April 2012, CBI filed second chargesheet and alleged that the ₹44.2 million (US$460,000) medical equipment procurement contract was awarded in pre-decided manner to two Moradabad based firms by the then Director General (Family Welfare) through UPSIC, thereby causing a loss of Rs 15 million to the exchequer. People named in the chargesheet were SP Ram (former Uttar Pradesh director general of Family Welfare), Abhay Kumar Bajpai (former MD, Uttar Pradesh Small Industries Corporation), Sanjeev Kumar (area manager) and Saurabh Jain (owner of a private firm) On the very next day CBI filed another chargesheet in the case and charged GK Batra (managing director of Uttar Pradesh Public Sector Undertaking Shreeton India Limited), Virender Goel (owner of Axis Marketing) and Neeraj Upadhyaya (owner of Radhey Shyam Enterprises) The agency alleged that irregularities in purchase of 951 computers and peripherals under the NRHM caused a loss of ₹2.78 crore (US$290,000) to the exchequer

== Ministerial resignations ==
In November 2011, Babu Singh Kushwaha, former Minister of Family Welfare in Mayawati's government and health minister Anant Kumar Mishra were forced to resign following media outcry after the killing of the two Chief Medical Officers remain unsolved. Kushwaha was once considered a close confidant of Chief Minister Mayawati. Shortly after this, the Kushwaha controversially joined the Bharatiya Janata Party. In July 2011, Lucknow chief medical officer (CMO) Dr A.K. Shukla was arrested on charge of embezzlement of funds under NRHM.

In February 2012, Babu Singh Khushwaha was listed as one of the accused in an FIR for an NRHM-related murder, and was interrogated by the CBI.

== Deaths of people with links to the scam ==
As of 17 February 2012, the number of people who have died because of their alleged links to the National Rural Health Mission scam has risen to six.

- Chief Medical Officer – On 27 October 2010, CMO Vinod Arya was murdered
- Chief Medical Officer – On 2 April 2011 another CMO B. P. Singh was shot dead from a motorcycle
- Deputy Chief Medical Officer – On 22 June 2011, deputy Chief Medical Officer Dr Y.S. Sachan was murdered, a day before he was to be deposed in the court. Sachan was an accused of the murder of Lucknow Chief Medical Officer Dr B.P. Singh, who was shot dead on 2 April.
- Project Manager – Vikash Gupta a project manager for the NRHM allegedly shot himself dead in Lucknow on 23 January 2012.

Ie

- Deputy Chief Medical Officer – Shailesh Yadav deputy Chief Medical Officer of Varanasi, who was questioned by the Central Bureau of Investigation(CBI) in connection with the NRHM scam in Uttar Pradesh, died in what police are claiming was a road accident on 15 February 2012.
- Clerk, Health department – Mahendra Sharma a clerk with the Health Department in Uttar Pradesh was found dead in Lakhimpur on 16 February 2012.
- Director(Former), Health Department – Dr. Pawan Kumar Srivastava was found dead in his house in Gorakhpur (Uttar Pradesh) after committing suicide on 10 January 2018.

== See also ==
- Corruption in India
- List of scandals in India
