= DIAL Scam =

DIAL Scam, also called Delhi Airport Land Scam, Airport Scam and the IGI Scam is a title popularly used in the media to refer to the irregularities pointed out in a report titled Implementation of Public – Private Partnership at Indira Gandhi International Airport, Delhi tabled on 17 August 2012 by the Comptroller and Auditor General of India (CAG). According to this report, 1.63 lakh crore (approximately $29.4 billion) was lost by the Indian exchequer due to a deal entered between the Airports Authority of India and DIAL (Delhi International Airport Limited) for the lease of land.

== Details ==
DIAL is a consortium led by GMR (with 54% ownership), Germany's Fraport AG and Malaysia Airport Holdings. According to the report 4800 acres (approx 19 square kilometers) of land of a brownfield airport (i.e. an existing airport were allotted to DIAL of which 240 acres (approx 971,245 square meters) could be developed commercially at Rs. 100 ($1.8) every year.

The report states that the land has an earnings potential of 1.63 lakh crores (approx $29.4 billion) which was assigned to the consortium against an equity contribution of 2,450 crores (approx. $442.7 million). The report also criticizes the development fees charged to passengers of the Delhi Airport who have to pay between Rs. 400 ($7.2) and Rs. 2600 ($46.85) depending on whether they are travelling on a domestic or international flight, as this charge was not a part of the original contract. According to the report this fee gives DIAL an advantage of Rs. 3,415 crores (approx $617 million), and should have been approved by the ministry and then mentioned initially to all parties bidding for the deal. The report also mentions that DIAL carried out construction on 553,887 square meters of land while it was allotted only 470,179 square meters in the major Development Plan (MDP) which led to an increase of the projected cost by 43%.

The DIAL in its defense has stated that the amount mentioned is the simply the amount of revenue due to DIAL and does not represent actual revenues; it does not consider the time value of money and it does not mention that 46% of this revenue is due to the Airports Authority of India. The DIAL also states that the entire land allotted to it for commercial use cannot be used immediately and would have to be developed in the future and hence, the revenue earned from the one acre (approx 4046 square meters) currently in use cannot be applied to the entire parcel of land. Further more, DIAL points out that the commercial usage of land was always a part of the agreement and was not given to it as preferential treatment, and that the parceling of this land has saved the government a lot of money in stamp duties.

== Criticisms ==
The Kissan Mahasanhg which is heading an agitation against the acquisition of land for the airport has called this deal a lose-lose deal highlighting the losses of the farmers (due to the cheap acquisition of land) and the losses of the passengers (who have to pay development fees).

CPM MP K. Balagopal has demanded a probe by a Federal Agency into the scam and has also pointed out that the Supreme Court has already ruled the charging of Development Fee as illegal.
