= Deendayal Upadhyaya Trust =

Deendayal Upadhyaya Trust is a charitable trust in Rajasthan noted for its involvement in a large land scam. The trust was founded by the Bharatiya Janata Party (BJP) leader Vasundhara Raje, at the time the Chief Minister of Rajasthan. The Trust was given prime land at 95% concessional rates by violating all norms. The land was returned after a media hue and cry, and after court insistence, corruption charges were filed.

== Allotment of concessional land to an unregistered trust ==
The Trust was formed on 14 April 2006, in the name of Bharatiya Jana Sangh leader Deendayal Upadhyaya, when Raje was the Chief Minister of Rajasthan. It was not registered till August. Meanwhile, well before its registration, the BJP mayor of Jaipur, Ashok Parnami, allotted 7,693 sq.m of prime land in Jaipur (an erstwhile palace for British residents) for the yet-to-exist trust. The land was intended for building a headquarters for BJP in Rajasthan.

The land, valued at Rs. 50 to 70 crore, was allotted to the trust for Rs. 65 lakh. Such concessional rates can be applied only in special circumstances, for bodies that have been working for at least three years, balance sheets for which need to be submitted. Since the trust did not meet these conditions, a zonal commissioner put in a dissent note, but these were overruled by the political bosses. On 6 June, it was decided to allot the land to the trust, which would be registered only two months later on 20 August 2006.

These facts were brought to notice in a Public Interest Litigation filed by lawyer Prakash Kukkar, and was highlighted by the Congress party opposition, and also by the erstwhile BJP politician and the then Vice President of India, Bhairon Singh Shekhawat.

In 2008, while the BJP was in power, the public prosecutor absolved Raje of any wrongdoing and refused to file the corruption case, since the land had been returned.

However, in 2009, a Jaipur court ruled that criminal charges be filed in the case. Along with Raje and Parnami, others named in the case include Lalit Kishore Chaturvedi, Pratap Singh Singhvi, Ajay Pal Singh, Satya Narain Gupta, Gulab Chand Kataria, Indresh Kumar (of the RSS), and Bhanwar Lal Sharma. As of 2013, the case is with the CID
