= Fatwas for cash scandal =

The Fatwas for cash scandal was a bribery scandal that erupted in some prominent Islamic institutions in India in September 2006 when a TV channel broadcast a Sting operation which showed a number of clerics indulging in or demanding bribery in return for issuing fatwas. The institutions involved included Darul Uloom Deoband, Islamic Fiqh Academy, Madrasa Aminia, Madrasa Khadimul Islam Hapur, Madrasa Mahmudiya Meerut and others.

The clerics involved included the likes of Habibur Rahman Khairabadi, the chief of the fatwa department of India's most famous Islamic seminary, the Darul Uloom Deoband. The sting operation was carried out by the Star TV channel in association with Cobrapost over a period of six months by undercover reporters wearing hidden cameras and was broadcast on Star TV's 'Benaqaab' program. It showed some of the clerics accepting bribes as low as $60, and handing out fatwas in Urdu on subjects requested by the reporters. The fatwas were of varied nature including disallowing Muslims from using credit cards, double beds, or camera-equipped cell phones, and acting in films, donating their organs, teaching their children English, against watching TV as well as another fatwa in support of watching TV. Darul Uloom Deoband set up a committee which concluded that the sting was a dishonest one and their Mufti did not take any money, and his fatwa was in accordance with the Shariah.

== Reactions ==
The ulemas and muftis (senior scholars and clerics) described the act as "shameful" and "condemnable". Mufti Ahsan Qasmi of Darul Uloom Waqf, Deoband said taking money to issue Fatwas was 'illegal' and an offence in Shariayt.

The scandal also led to a debate among the ulemas and muftis as well as the Muslim populace on questions like "what constitutes a fatwa" and "who has legitimate authority to issue a fatwa". Students of one madrassa denounced the clerics and the congregation of a mosque whose Mufti had been caught on camera, refused to offer prayers until the Mufti came before them, admitted his misconduct, and apologized.

Habibur Rahman Khairabadi of Darul Uloom Deoband was among the accused. In his reaction, Islamic scholar Muhammadullah Khalili Qasmi mentioned that Habibur Rahman's "fatwa" about the permissibility of credit card was misquoted as his fatwa in the registry of the seminary's Dārul Ifta says that "in essence credit card is permissible" and it was quoted otherwise. Mufti Mahmud Hussain who is a Mufti at the seminary and holds a chair near to Habibur Rahman, witnessed that the questioners offered Habibur Rahman some money, which he rejected strongly. The Darul Uloom Deoband set up a committee to investigate this case and it was found that the Mufti did not take any money for issuing edicts. Instead, the money that he was seen putting in his bag, was a profitable amount that he had received for the sale of his books. The committee also noted that since the edict was Islamically correct; there was no sense in saying that "the edicts were issued according to someone's will". The other institutes also rejected the accusations made in the sting. Khalīli expressed that the program was dishonest and deceit, and it was Muslim hostility of media which was exposed.
