= Webwork (Indian website) =

- Type: Privately owned
- Genre: Deposit mobilising company
- Founder: Anurag Garg, Sandesh Verma
- Headquarters: India

Webwork was an Indian website portal accused of being a Ponzi scheme. The site was promoted by a Bollywood star, and was said to have scammed Rs 125 crore from users. Webwork's directors were arrested in February 2017.

In February 2017, the Noida office of Webwork Trade Links was sealed for allegedly running an online Ponzi scheme, soliciting investments from Rs 11,000 to Rs 57,500 to become "publishers." Investors were promised Rs 6 per website "like." Despite the office closure, police recovered demand drafts worth Rs 20 lakh, sent after the sealing, in addition to the previously seized Rs 6 crore in demand drafts. Directors Anurag Garg and Sandesh Verma were arrested following numerous complaints. The scam affected over 2 lakh people, who invested more than Rs 240 crore.

== See also ==
- List of scandals in India
- Pyramid scheme
- Saradha Group financial scandal
- Corruption in India
- Rose Valley financial scandal
