= Concerns and controversies at the 2010 Commonwealth Games =

A number of concerns and controversies surfaced before the 2010 Commonwealth Games in New Delhi, India, which received widespread media coverage both in India (the host nation) and the rest of the world.

The Commonwealth Games was severely criticised by several prominent Indian politicians and social activists because millions of dollars have been spent on the sporting event despite the fact that India has one of the world's largest concentration of poor people. Additionally, several other problems related to the 2010 Commonwealth Games have been highlighted by Indian investigative agencies and media outlets; these include – serious corruption by officials of the Games.

== Socio-economic impact ==
=== Financial costs ===
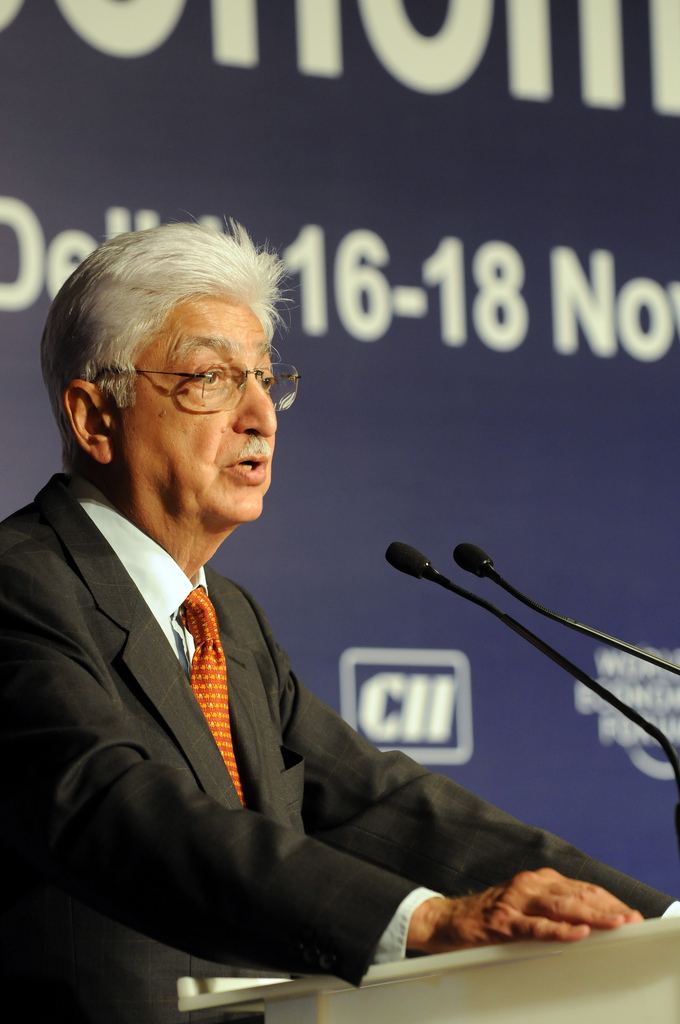
Azim Premji, founder of Wipro Technologies, remarked that India faced several socio-economic challenges and "to instead spend on a grand sporting spectacle sounds like we [India] have got our priorities wrong."

Miloon Kothari, a leading Indian expert on socio-economic development, remarked that the 2010 Commonwealth Games will create "a negative financial legacy for the country" and asked "when one in three Indians lives below the poverty line and 40% of the hungry live in India, when 46% of India's children and 55% of women are malnourished, does spending billions of dollars on a 12-day sports event build national pride or is it a matter of national shame?"

One of the outspoken critics of the Games was Mani Shankar Aiyar, former Indian Minister for Youth Affairs and Sports. In April 2007, Aiyar commented that the Games are "irrelevant to the common man" and criticized the Indian government for sanctioning billions of dollars for the Games even though India requires massive investment in social development programs. In July 2010, he remarked that he would be "unhappy if the Commonwealth Games are successful".

Azim Premji called the 2010 Commonwealth Games a "drainage of the public funds" and said that hosting the high-expense Games in India is not justified given that the country had more important priorities facing it, such as education, infrastructure and public health.

=== Social and environmental impact ===
Nearly 400,000 people from three large slum clusters in Delhi have been relocated since 2004. Gautam Bhan, an Indian urban planner and researcher working in the University of California-Berkeley, said that the 2010 Commonwealth Games have resulted in "an unprecedented increase in the degree, frequency and scale of indiscriminate evictions without proper resettlement. We haven’t seen these levels of evictions in the last five years since the Indian Emergency".

In response to a Right to Information (RTI) application filed for study and statements by civil society groups, a report by the Housing and Land Rights Network (HLRN) - an arm of the Habitat International Coalition - detailed the social and environmental consequences of the event. It stated that no tolerance zones for beggars are enforced in Delhi, and the city has arbitrarily arrested homeless citizens under the "Bombay Prevention of Begging Act 1959".

=== Labour laws violations ===
Campaigners in India have accused the organisers of enormous and systematic violations of labour laws at construction sites. Human Rights Law Network reports that independent investigations have discovered more than 70 cases where workers have died in accidents at construction sites since work began. Although official numbers have not been released, it is estimated that over 415,000 contract daily wage workers are working on Games projects. Unskilled workers are paid ₹85 (90.8¢ US) to ₹100 (US$1.10) per day while skilled workers are paid ₹120 (US$1.30) to ₹130 (US$1.40) INR per day for eight hours of work. Workers also state that they are paid ₹134 (US$1.40) to ₹150 (US$1.60) for 12 hours of work (eight hours plus four hours of overtime). Both these wages contravene the stipulated Delhi state minimum wage of ₹152 (US$1.60) for eight hours of work. Nearly 50 construction workers have died in the past two years while employed on Games projects.

These represent violations of the Minimum Wages Act, 1948; Interstate Migrant Workmen (Regulation of Employment and Condition of Services) Act 1979, and the constitutionally enshrined fundamental rights per the 1982 Supreme Court of India judgement on Asiad workers. The public have been banned from the camps where workers live and work – a situation which human rights campaigners say prevents the garnering of information regarding labour conditions and number of workers.

There have been documented instances of the presence of young children at hazardous construction sites, due to a lack of child care facilities for women workers living and working in the labour camp style work sites. Furthermore, workers on the site of the main Commonwealth stadium have reportedly been issued with hard hats, yet most work in open-toed sandals and live in cramped tin tenements in which illnesses are rife. The High Court of Delhi is presently hearing a public interest petition relating to employers not paying employees for overtime and it has appointed a four-member committee to submit a report on the alleged violations of workers rights.

During the construction of the Games Village, there was controversy over financial mismanagement, profiteering by the Delhi Development Authority and private real estate companies, and inhumane working conditions.

==== Child labour ====
CNN India discovered evidence of children, as young as seven, being used in the construction of the game's infrastructures. According to Siddharth Kara, who provided CNN with the evidence, he documented 14 cases of child labor within a few days. In reply to a question whether it could have been just a case of kids being present at the construction site along with their parents, he replied: "It's not just kids playing in the dirt or using a hammer as a toy." He further stated about the kids: "They're told to do the work and they just do the work. They don't know that they should be in school or that they should be playing."

Even though the New Delhi then chief minister Sheila Dikshit claimed that nobody had approached her, according to CNN, they had tried to contact her as far back as 23 July 2010. In spite of repeated attempts, according to them, no official reply was ever made.

=== Urban changes ===
Amita Baviskar, a professor of sociology from the Institute of Economic Growth, University of Delhi argues that mega-events, like the Olympics and Commonwealth Games, are used to advance narrow agendas of urban reform that cater to the middle and rich class. She focuses on how, in preparation for the Commonwealth Games, the city's slums were bulldozed in order to make room for shopping malls and expensive real estate.

=== Sex slavery and prostitution boom ===
There has been a boom in the number of young girls, mostly from impoverished parts of India, coming to Delhi after being offered jobs by disguised criminals, only to be taken prisoner and forced into sex slavery. The number of victims is believed to be in the hundreds. Many brothels have been running English courses for sex workers and upgrading their facilities in anticipation of a business upturn during the games. The local government also expected that thousands of prostitutes from other countries would come to Delhi disguised as tourists and practice their profession discreetly during the Games. One anti-trafficking NGO has claimed that there are reports of 40,000 women being brought in from northeastern India alone. A spokesperson said that recruits from that part of India were favoured because of their lighter skin. It has been reported that over 3,000 bar girls in Mumbai disappeared; some local sources blamed on an exodus to Delhi in a focus for the Commonwealth Games.

== Organisational failure ==
=== Vigilance-related irregularities and over-invoicing ===
On 28 July 2010, the Central Vigilance Commission, an Indian government body created to address governmental corruption, released a series of reports and documents showing the irregularities in 14 CWG projects. As per official reports, in total 129 works in 71 organisations have been inspected. The detailed preliminary findings included the award of work contracts at higher prices, poor quality assurance and management, and work contracts awarded to ineligible agencies.

There are also allegations of widespread corruption in various aspects of organising the games including procurement and awarding contracts for constructing the games infrastructures. The Commonwealth Games Organising Committee on 5 August 2010 suspended joint directors T S Darbari and M Jayachandran following the reports of the three-member panel which was probing the financial irregularities related to the Queen's Baton Relay.

During the audit process, the Organising Committee treasurer Anil Khanna resigned from the post in the wake of allegations that his son's firm had secured a contract for laying the tennis courts. The GlobalPost news agency reports that scandals have come to light, such as "shadowy off-shore firms, forged emails, inexplicable payments to bogus companies and inflated bills – for every purchase from toilet paper to treadmills." Among the alleged corruption and defrauding of the games budget, toilet paper rolls valued at $2 were costed at $80, $2 soap dispensers at $60, $98 mirrors at $220, $11,830 altitude training simulators at $250,190.

=== Delays in the works ===
In September 2009, CGF chief Mike Fennell reported that the games were at risk of falling behind schedule and that it was "reasonable to conclude that the current situation poses a serious risk to the Commonwealth Games in 2010". A report by the Indian Government released several months prior found that construction work on 13 out of the 19 sports venues was very low and behind schedule.

The secretary-general of the Indian Olympic Association (IOA) Randhir Singh has also expressed his concerns regarding the current state of affairs. Singh has called for the revamp of the Organising Committee commenting that India now has to "retrieve the games". Other Indian officials have also expressed dismay at the ongoing delays but they have stated that they are confident that India will successfully host the games and do so on time.

As the Times of India reports, all CWG projects were to be completed by May 2009 and until the Games they had to be available for the trial events. The newspaper further reports that the first stadium was handed over for trial runs in July 2010, three months before the Games. To put the delays in perspective, Beijing National Stadium was completed in 2006, two years before the 2008 Summer Olympics, while the venues for 2012 Summer Olympics in London are scheduled to be delivered one year before the games and the construction of the venues were a very behind of the schedule.

In August 2010, the Cabinet Secretariat took a decision to appoint 10 officers of the rank of Joint and Additional Secretaries to oversee the progress of the construction of the venues. Each officer is allocated to a venue and given the responsibility to ensure that the work completes in time for the games.

=== Mass volunteer walkouts ===
Around 10,000 of the 22,000 selected volunteers quit, less than a week before the event. This has been blamed on a lack of training for personnel, or dissatisfaction with assignments. Australian media reported that a large portion of this group did not even return their uniforms as a form of protest.

=== Poor ticket sales and attendance ===
During the first days of the Games was normal to observe that several competitions were held with practically empty arenas. The only exception was the opening ceremony, which was held in a packed stadium. In a press conference, organising chairman Suresh Kalmadi admitted that there were problems, and blamed empty venues on ticket booths not being set up outside stadiums. Commonwealth Games chief Mike Fennell admitted that many venues had been nearly empty on the opening day of the Games, saying "A number of venues do not have lots of spectators. It is one area which causes us concern". On the second day of competition, less than 100 people filled the hockey venue–the 19,000-seat MDC Stadium. Less than 20 people watched the first tennis match of the tournament in the 5,000-seat tennis stadium, and just 58 watched the netball opening rounds matches.

One Indian athlete tried to buy tickets for relatives online, only to be informed by the website that tickets were sold out. When he arrived to the venue, he found the venue to be empty.This was also reported during the athletics street events and cycling road races.

=== Incidents during the opening ceremonies ===
==== Speech of Suresh Kalmadi ====
During his speech at the opening ceremony, the president of the Organizing Committee, Suresh Kalmadi, faced a public embarrassment, when he was booed by spectators at the start of his welcome speech to 80,000 spectators. Kalmadi came under further another strain when he "thanked" the late Princess Diana for attending the opening ceremony of the games. The chairman made the blunder at a press conference saying 'Yes, Princess Diana was there,’ after which he immediately corrected himself by saying 'Prince Charles and (Camilla) the Duchess of Cornwall.

==== Parade of Nations ====
Australia's chef de mission Steve Moneghetti expressed the frustration of the delegation over the opening ceremony, in which there were claims that the athletes and delegation support staff were "treated like cattle" and subjected to "disgraceful" and unbearable conditions. Moneghetti also complained about the athletes being trapped in "absolute cauldron conditions" under the main stadium before marching for the opening ceremony. The Australians were stuck in a tunnel, where Moneghetti described the temperature as exceeding 40 °C (104 °F) due to a lack of air-conditioning and ventilation. When attempting to move out, the Australian delegation was stopped by staff. When the athletes were finally able to move out into the arena as the first delegation, they were described as being emotionally affected.

== Racism allegations ==
Some African countries' representatives complained that they received second-class treatment from the Games organisers, in spite of them offering India a hand in the preparation of the Games. These delegations alleged that accommodation given to them was inferior compared to the accommodation provided to the Australian and New Zealand teams. They went on to state that India was complaining about being victims of racial bias in the reporting of the Games, while simultaneously perpetrating the same kind of racism against the African countries.

== Infrastructure issues ==
=== Transport infrastructure ===
The Delhi Airport Metro Express built by Reliance Infrastructure and CAF missed its deadline of 31 July 2010 and the private consortium was fined Rs 112.5 million.

=== Village conditions ===
Less than two weeks before the opening ceremony, Fennell wrote to the Indian cabinet secretary, urging action in response to the village being "seriously compromised." He said that though team officials were impressed with the international zone and main dining area, they were "shocked" by the state of the accommodation. "The village is the cornerstone of any Games and the athletes deserve the best possible environment to prepare for their competition." The BBC published photographs of the village taken two days before 23 September showing unfinished living quarters.

New Zealand, Canada, Scotland and Northern Ireland have expressed concern about unliveable conditions. The Times of India newspaper reports that the leaders of the Scottish delegation apparently submitted a photograph of a dog defecating on a bed in the games village. The chef of Scottish mission said that there was "excrement in places it shouldn't be" in the athletes' quarters and that members of visiting delegations had to clean up the unsanitary things. The BBC released images of bathrooms with brown-coloured paan stains on the walls and floor, liquor on the floor, and brown paw prints on athletes' beds. Lalit Bhanot, the secretary general of the Organising Committee, rejected the complaint that sanitation was poor by saying that, due to cultural differences, there are different standards about cleanliness in India and the western world, a statement for which he was widely ridiculed in all over the world. Bhanot went on to say of the athletes' village that, "This is a world-class village, probably one of the best ever."

Meanwhile, Pakistan also made reservations over the condition of the athletes' village and asked for an alternate accommodation to be made available to its contingent while preparation was still in progress. The Pakistan Olympic Association president Syed Arif Hasan remarked: "We want the CGF to ensure that the athletes' village is in good condition. Athletes cannot stay at a substandard place." Hasan however added that there were no doubts over Pakistan's participation and the contingent would leave as planned.

On the other hand, England's Chef de mission Craig Hunter praised the Games Village, remarking that "the Commonwealth Games Village here [in New Delhi] is better than the 2008 Beijing Summer Olympics". He added that the arrangements at the Games Village is much better than that at the 2008 Summer Olympics.

Canada's sports minister also supported the Games, saying that big events always face issues, and the media often exaggerates them, as Canada found during the 2010 Winter Olympics. He added that "We are coming in full force."

=== Problems with functionality of equipment and infrastructure during events ===
On the first night of swimming events, debris landed in the swimming pool, causing delays ahead of a race. It is believed that part of the ceiling or its paint had fallen off.

Before the last night of swimming finals, the water filtration system broke down and the pool was turbid and murky during the warm-up session and the finals; it was described as the least clear ever seen for a swimming competition until the 2016 Summer Olympics. A disproportionate number of swimmers from Australia and Malaysia fell ill with intestinal infections, leading to concerns over the cleanliness and sanitation of the pool. Early suspicions rested on the quality of water in the swimming pools of the SPM Pools Complex, but other competing teams, including South Africa, reported no such illness. Daily water quality tests were being carried out on the water of the pools, as mandated by the event standards. Additional tests were ordered after news of the illnesses, but they also did not find anything amiss. The Australian team's chief doctor, Peter Harcourt, ruled that the "chances of the [Delhi] pool being the cause of the problem is very remote" and praised the hygiene and food quality in the Delhi Games Village. He suggested that it could be a common case of Traveler's diarrhea (locally called Delhi belly), or the Australian swimmers could have contracted the stomach virus during their training camp in Kuala Lumpur, Malaysia. English Olympic and Commonwealth gold-medalist swimmer Rebecca Adlington said that the water quality was absolutely fine.

During the opening ceremony, some areas of the Jawaharlal Nehru Stadium field suffered damage. Some areas of the lawn and parts of the track and also the walls needed to be replaced. During the dismantling of the temporary structures, the affected areas were renovated and the lawn was replanted.

== Vandalism of Games village by athletes ==
=== Condoms and toilet blockages ===
An Indian newspaper during the games reported that used condoms flushed down the toilets in the athlete's village had caused some drains to become blocked, necessitating action by plumbers to clear the pipes.

=== Athletes under investigation for trashing apartments ===
Australian athletes were accused of vandalizing the towers of the athletes' village they were staying in by breaking furniture and electrical fittings. Delhi Police did not press the case after the Organizing Committee refused to file a complaint while Indian external affairs minister S. M. Krishna dismissed it as a one-off incident.

A washing machine was hurled from the eighth floor of the same tower. Nobody on the ground was hit, but it is unclear who the culprit was. Indian newspapers reported that the Australian Commonwealth Games Authority agreed to pay for the damages and apologised for the incident. The Australian High Commissioner rejected the claim, stating that the incident was the result of partying and celebrations. Later comments by Australian officials contradicted claims by Lalit Bhanot that they had admitted responsibility. Perry Crosswhite said that it was still unclear if athletes from other nations present in the tower at the time had been responsible.

== Safety and security concerns ==
Small monkeys roam Delhi's streets and prefer heavily urbanized areas with plenty of living space among the buildings and cannot be killed because many Indians see them as sacred. A larger, domesticated species of monkey, the langur, was brought to the Games Village to scare away the smaller monkeys.

On the second day of the games, three Ugandan delegates were injured by a malfunctioning security barrier at the games' village. The officials had cuts and bruises and were hospitalized overnight for observation. A senior official from Uganda raised allegations of discrimination by Indian officials. Uganda's sports minister lashed out at Indian officials and demanded an apology for the accident. The chairman of the Games' Organising Committee, Suresh Kalmadi, apologized to the Ugandan High Commissioner to India for the incident.

=== Infrastructural failures ===
On 21 September 2010, a footbridge under construction for the Games near the Jawaharlal Nehru Stadium collapsed, injuring at least 23 people who were working at the structure, mainly workers, underscoring fears of poor workmanship. Commenting on the incident, the then Chief Minister of Delhi Sheila Dikshit controversially remarked that the footbridge was only meant for spectators and not for athletes. Following the collapse, Fennell expressed again the concerns that conditions at the Games Village, which had "shocked the majority", would seriously compromise the entire event. The company that was building the foot bridge, P&R Infraprojects, was subsequently blacklisted by the Delhi Government and was not allowed to get government contracts.

Reportedly, progress was still slow and four or five towers at the Games village were unfinished, lacking facilities such as wireless internet, fitted toilets and plumbing. In addition, rubble, unused masonry and discarded bricks littered the unfinished gardens. According to sports historian Boria Majumdar, author of the Sellotape Legacy: Delhi and the Commonwealth Games, India "may have to pull a miracle." The father of Australian track cyclist Kaarle McCulloch visited his daughter at the Olympic village. A builder in Australia, Grahame McCulloch criticised the structural soundness of the village; he said "those buildings are the dodgiest things I have ever seen...so substandard". He told his daughter not to use the balcony, fearing that it was collapsible.

The next day after the catwalk fell, part of the drop ceiling of the Commonwealth Games weightlifting collapsed.

Also on the same day, Indian bantamweight boxer Akhil Kumar's bed in the Games village collapsed when he sat on it. "I sat down on my bed to rest but suddenly it gave way. After that I noticed that part of it has no plywood", he said

On 27 September 2010, the South African delegation reported that a snake was present in an athlete room in the Games Village. A day earlier, animal authorities had to be called in to evacuate a king cobra from the tennis arena's sewage system.

On 7 October, during the Games day 4, the scoreboard at the Delhi University Stadium crashed to the ground when a supporting chain snapped. As the competition would start a week after the incident, there was no harm to the athletes or the event.

=== Terrorist threats ===
Following the 2008 Mumbai attacks, some athletes and their representative bodies expressed security fears during the games. In April 2010, during the Indian Premier League, two low intensity bombs went off outside the M. Chinnaswamy Stadium in Bangalore. Although there were no casualties, this postponed the start of the game by an hour. Following this attack, foreign cricketers like Kevin Pietersen expressed fears for their safety and questions were raised regarding the safety of athletes during the Commonwealth Games. Although cricket was not on this Game's program, UK and Canadian authorities also warned about potential attacks on commercial targets in Delhi ahead of the games.

==== Jama Masjid Mosque incident ====
On 19 September 2010, unknown gunmen on a motorbike opened fire with an automatic pistol on a tourist bus outside the Jama Masjid Mosque in Delhi. The attacks, which came a fortnight before the start of the games, injured two Taiwanese tourists. Two hours later, a Maruti car exploded in the vicinity, reportedly from a deliberate low-intensity pressure cooker bomb which had been assembled inside. No fatalities or major damages were reported. The incidents, which were purportedly claimed by the Indian Mujahideen group, provoked fears about lack of security in the city for the upcoming games. However, police in Delhi initially denied the role of any organised terror group and instead blamed the attacks on "disgruntled youths and local criminal gangs." Officials suggested that a possible motive of the strike was to instill fear in people ahead of the Commonwealth Games.

=== Fear of a dengue outbreak ===
In 2010, the heaviest monsoon rains in 15 years was recorded in India, along with large quantities of standing water on CWG construction sites as well as in tanks and ponds, this situation raised concerns over increased levels of Aedes aegypti larvae and mosquitoes in Delhi. In the run-up to the games it was reported that 65-70 cases of dengue fever were being diagnosed each day in the city, with the number of cases "likely to hit the 3,000 mark" at the opening ceremonies day in 3 October.

=== Water related Illness ===
Many swimmers were reported to have fallen ill. Initially, concerns were raised over the quality of water in the swimming pools of the SPM Swimming Pool Complex. It was said that more than 20 percent of the English team's swimmers – about eight to 10 competitors – had been struck down with a stomach virus. The Australian team also reported that at least six of its swimmers had been sick, including Andrew Lauterstein, who had to withdraw from the 50-meter butterfly. Commonwealth Games Federation president Mike Fennell said officials would conduct tests to make sure the pools were not the source of the illness. "If there is something unsafe, you cannot swim in that water. It is a matter we have to deal with a great deal of urgency," he said.

However, other competing teams, including South Africa, reported no such illness. Daily water quality tests were being carried out on the water of the pools, as mandated by the event standards. Additional tests were ordered after news of the illnesses, but they also did not find anything amiss. The Australian team's chief doctor, Peter Harcourt, ruled that the "chances of the [Delhi] pool being the cause of the problem is very remote" and praised the hygiene and food quality in the Delhi Games Village. He suggested that it could be a common case of Traveler's diarrhea (locally called Delhi belly), or the Australian swimmers could have contracted the stomach virus during their training camp in Kuala Lumpur, Malaysia. English Olympic and Commonwealth gold-medalist swimmer Rebecca Adlington said that the water quality was absolutely fine.

== Boycotts ==
Following the withdrawal of Dani Samuels, the then women's world discus champion, because "[her] safety [was] more important to them than a medal," Australia's Minister for Sport, Mark Arbib, said CWG officials expected more competitors to follow suit.

The departure of last part of the Scottish delegation ended up being delayed for 48 hours, and also the Welsh team set a deadline of 22 September to receive reassurances that the venues would be fit for purpose. The first group of English athletes, which included the lawn bowls team and a men's hockey squad, said the organisers were not making nearly enough progress just a day before they were to leave. The Guardian suggested a mass walkout remained an option with the "point of no return" less than a week before the opening ceremonies; they claimed the "main competing countries would be likely to act in concert."They also suggested the games were on the verge of "descending into farce."

Michael Cavanagh, the chairman of Commonwealth Games Scotland, said a decision to stay away would be a joint one, as he insisted a possible knock on effects for the 2014 Commonwealth Games in Glasgow would not be a factor. He said "In terms of withdrawal we don't see this as simply a Team Scotland decision, any decision to withdraw we would see as being a collective decision amongst the countries who are already there and already concerned. We can't allow ourselves to be influenced by thoughts of how it may impact on 2014, not when we have something as important as the safety of our athletes to consider." Phillips Idowu, the then world triple jump champion, also withdrew from the Games.

=== Calls for boycott ===
Amidst allegations of blatant corruption, shoddy construction work at venues and security concerns for participating athletes, the 2010 Commonwealth Games have faced numerous boycott calls from individuals in India, England and Australia.

Within India, there were calls for boycott. A group of celebrities also called a boycott. This group included former Indian cricket captain and spin bowler Bishan Singh Bedi and bestselling Indian author Chetan Bhagat. Bedi said the "CWG organisers have taken the country for a ride" and urged international athletes to boycott the "embarrassing" Delhi games. Bhagat, who is considered a youth icon in India with a huge fan following, called the Commonwealth games the "biggest and most blatant exercise in mass corruption since the country won their independence six decades ago." Bhagat, who has sold more than 4 million books in India, also urged his readers to boycott the games event and not to watch them on TV, thereby using the "golden chance" to "put the corrupt and insensitive government to shame."

The Jat community seeking reservation under the OBC quota have also planned to use the Commonwealth games as a platform and force the Indian government to relent to their needs.

Other associations also threatened to boycott the games. Considering the potential impact of a terror threat and other security concerns, rumors arose about a boycott of the Delhi Commonwealth Games by major participating nations including Scotland, England and New Zealand. However, the rumors were soon put to rest by Commonwealth games committees in each of these countries who expressed a general level of satisfaction with the security arrangements.

Australian quadruple Olympic gold medal-winning swimmer Dawn Fraser called for Australia to boycott the games event, citing fears of a tragedy similar to that which unfolded in the 1972 Summer Olympics. Fraser pronounced that reports of missed construction deadlines and other irregularities in games planning meant Indian authorities' "word for providing security should not be taken at its face value." However, the Australian Commonwealth Games Association was quick to dismiss Fraser's fears with ACGA chief executive, Perry Crosswhite saying he believed there will be no security issues during the games event. John Coates, Australian Olympic Committee president, came down hard on the organisers, alleging teams were being forced to temporary accommodation at hotels. "I don't think it is a cultural thing. When you agree to host [the Games], you are required to provide the basics in terms of health and hygiene for the athletes. The Games shouldn't have been awarded to Delhi in hindsight."

== Sporting controversies ==
=== Doping ===
Just before the Games, the Indian team suffered seven casualties when four wrestlers, two swimmers and a shot putter were cut from the team as a result of positive tests for methylhexaneamine. Four others, who were not picked for the Games, also failed drug tests conducted at the various training camps across the country.

The same substance was recorded in the examination of Nigerian runner Oludamola Osayomi who won the women's 100 meters on athletics in an event hit by another big controversy. Another Nigerian athlete, hurdler Samuel Okon who placed sixth in the 110 metres hurdles, was reported to have tested positive for the same drug.

In July 2011, three of the four women from India's gold medal-winning 400-metre-relay team tested positive for performance-enhancing drugs. Two of the racers, Sini Jose and Jauna Murmu, tested positive for the anabolic steroid methandienone, and Tiana Mary Thomas tested positive for epi-methandienone.

=== Audience behavior during some events ===
==== Archery ====
While the audience's behaviour at the archery event provoked criticism from the English team, the silver medalist, Alison Williamson, praised it on the other hand. Earlier reports held that the English team was upset because the loud chant of the crowd during the women's recurve event had distracted the archers. In an action condemned in the Indian media, an English archery official allegedly abused an Indian coach, telling him to "f*** off." The comment came after the Indian team registered a one-point win over England to claim the gold medal. The Indian archery head coach, Limba Ram, walked over to shake hands with officials of the rival team. In response, an English official showed his elbow in a gesture before uttering the remarks. Britain's archery team leader said she was unaware of the incident and added, "[the Indian coach] must find out whether the person was one among us. If he was not wearing a red jersey, he would not be part of the side. I will speak to the Indian coach about it." Limba Ram said that he failed to identify the person as he had chosen to ignore the one-off incident. There have also been accusations that Ram was called a monkey on two different occasions by an English official.

=== Athletics ===
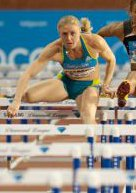
Pearson won the 100m sprint before being disqualified.

During the Final of the Women's 100m sprint final, a controversy was caused by the eventual disqualification of Sally Pearson of Australia. She had won the race on the third attempted start after one start was delayed because of excessive crowd noise and the second due to a false start by Laura Turner of England. Pearson was disqualified because she was deemed to have false-started in the second attempted restart along with Turner. This was as a direct result of a protest lodged by Team England. The controversy was caused as only Turner was disqualified from the race during the race because of a false start and not Pearson. Turner ran the race under protest. Pearson and other athletes were not informed of the protest until four hours after the race, as they were waiting to begin the medal presentation for the race. Commonwealth Games Federation president Mike Fennell called Pearson's treatment "unsatisfactory" and that the whole situation was caused by an "unacceptable communications blunder".

=== Boxing weigh-in ===
During the weigh-in for the boxing competition, the scales were giving inaccurate readings with athletes recording higher body weights on the official scales. The scales were deemed to be broken and the weigh-in was delayed 24 hours to find and calibrate new scales. The initial wrong measurements led to angry shouting between coaches, athletes and organisers. During the boxing competition there have been claims made by various teams including England and Botswana that jabs were not being scored by judges. This was attributed to the removal of a white scoring zone placed on the boxers gloves which is usually present in amateur boxing events. The BBC commentating team also claimed there to be a bias in judges scores towards Indian competitors.

=== Cycling ===
During the final of the Men's Keirin, Malaysian Azizulhasni Awang was disqualified for aggressive interference when he forced his way past two competitors. Race winner Josiah Ng said he was "mystified" over Awang's disqualification. In the semi-final round of the keirin, Australia's Shane Perkins was disqualified for dangerous riding with the official reason not being made clear. Perkins subsequently won the classification race and was described by Chris Boardman from the BBC to "have aimed an angry V-sign at officials"; he gestured to the judges with his index and middle finger held together. No subsequent action was taken against Perkins who later said, "the officials need to go back to school", referencing poor decisions he felt had been made in the sprint and keirin events.

=== Swimming ===
On another occasion, South African swimmer Roland Schoeman came under criticism when he referred to the crowd at the swimming as "going on like monkeys" in a post-race poolside interview. Schoeman's remarks came after he narrowly avoided being disqualified as he and England's Simon Burnett fell in at the start of the 50m freestyle when distracted by the crowd noise. The swimming has been persistently affected by Indian spectators ignoring etiquette and shouting out while the competitors were preparing for the start. His comment was regarded as possibly being a racial ethnic slur, although he later said that the word was commonly used in South Africa to refer to mischievous behaviour. At an official press conference, organising committee secretary-general Lalit Bhanot took the complaints about monkeys literally. Not being aware of the complaints, Bhanot felt Delhi's wildlife was at issue: "We know especially at the swimming pool there are a lot of monkeys and we have made efforts to keep them away from the swimming pool."

=== Wrestling ===
Australian wrestler Hassene Fkiri was ejected from the 96 kg Greco-Roman competition and stripped of the silver medal after making an obscene gesture at the international FILA judges during the final. According to an Australian official, Fkiri was furious at his Indian rival Anil Kumar, who he accused of breaking the rules a number of times in the first period by holding Fkiri around the neck and head with two hands. The Australian received his first warning after he made a comment to the referee as he walked off the mat at the end of the two-minute period; when Kumar repeated the same move in the next round, Fkiri headbutted him and was issued a second warning. He then proceeded to swing his arms uncontrollably afterwards, which resulted in his third warning and eventual disqualification. After losing, Fkiri refused to shake hands with the victor.

== Reactions and responses ==
Responding to media concerns, the organisers said there were 48 hours to save the Games after warnings of a pull out.

Numerous Bollywood actors also expressed their dismay at the state of the Games.

Four days before the start of the games, tickets for the opening, closing ceremonies, and the 100 m athletics were still not sold out.

The Sydney Morning Herald wrote that despite Kalmadi's "blind optimism", the games were not going to be the best ever. Instead, it wrote that it was "probably the most interesting."

The opening ceremony played a key role in improving the image of the Games. As athletes arrived and competitions started, many earlier critics changed their view. The Australian Sports Minister said that India could now aim for the Olympics, and the President of the International Olympic Committee, Jacques Rogge, said that India had made a good foundation for a future Olympics bid. As the Games concluded, many observers remarked that they began on an apprehensive note, but were an exceptional experience with a largely positive ending. Some observers accused sections of the media of bias, unfair expectations, and negative reporting.

Within India, the Games saw criticism due to the Games' origins as a celebration of the British Empire, with Arindam Chaudhuri arguing for India's disassociation from the "slavish games" which he viewed as a "celebration of racial discrimination, colonialism [and] imperialism".

=== Criticism by Mani Shankar Aiyar ===
Mani Shankar Aiyar, a senior member of the ruling Indian National Congress party and former Minister of Youth and Sports Affairs was an early whistleblower from the Indian Union Cabinet who expressed concern over extensive delays in preparation leading to unplanned expenses which he said, could have been utilized for "ensuring a better sporting future for Indian children by providing them sports training". Aiyar also said that he would be "unhappy" if the Games were a success and wished for the "Commonwealth Games to be spoiled."

Aiyar's frank media admission proved a public embarrassment for Commonwealth Games Organising Committee chairman Suresh Kalmadi who labelled him "anti national" for wishing that the Commonwealth Games are "spoilt." Kalmadi's remark received extensive criticism in Indian media.

Aiyar also told an Australian TV channel that India is "probably the poorest country of the Commonwealth". Bangladesh, among other countries, has a lower GDP per capita/purchasing power parity.

== Allegations of corruption and financial irregularities ==
The day after the conclusion of the Games, the Indian Government announced formation of a special committee to probe the allegations of corruption and mismanagement against the Organizing Committee (OC). The probe committee was led by former Comptroller and Auditor General of India V. K. Shunglu. This probe was in addition to the Directorate General of Income Tax Investigation, Central Bureau of Investigation (CBI), Enforcement Directorate, and Central Vigilance Commission (CVC) investigations already underway. The then Prime Minister, Dr. Manmohan Singh, had promised in mid-August, when reports of the bungling first surfaced, that corrupt officials will be given "severe and exemplary" punishment after the Games. The committee was given three months time to submit its report.

A total of 53 corruption cases were being examined by the CVC. As of September 2012, 28 of them were still in different stages of investigation, 13 were referred to CBI for further investigation and 12 were closed.

=== Timing-Scoring-Result (TSR) case ===
This case relates to allegations of corruption in awarding TSR system contract to a Swiss firm

==== CBI investigation and chargesheet ====
On 25 April 2011, CBI arrested former CWG Organising Committee (OC) chairman Suresh Kalmadi in the Timing-Scoring-Result (TSR) case. He was arrested under Sections 120 B (criminal conspiracy) and 420 (cheating) of the Indian Penal Code.

On 20 May 2011, CBI filed the first chargesheet in a special CBI court against Kalmadi. The CBI alleged that he was the main accused in awarding TSR system contract to a Swiss firm. The chargesheet said, "Kalmadi is the main accused as he was the person with all supreme powers. He had the supreme over-riding powers in the Organising Committee of the CWG, 2010." In addition to Kalmadi, the CBI named two companies and eight persons including OC former Secretary General Lalit Bhanot and former Director General VK Verma as accused.

The accused were charged under various provisions of the Indian Penal Code sections dealing with criminal conspiracy, forging documents and using fake documents as genuine, Section 13 (1) (d) of the Prevention of Corruption Act.

According to the charge sheet, the accused allegedly awarded the lucrative contract to the Swiss firm to install a TSR system for the Commonwealth Games at an excessive cost, causing a loss of over ₹900 million (US$9.6 million) to the exchequer. The investigation revealed that officials of the OC had conspired with private persons for awarding the contract at an excessive net cost of about ₹1,576 million (US$17 million) as compared to a net bid of Spain-based company for approximately ₹620 million (US$6.6 million). This resulted in a loss of about ₹956 million (US$10 million) by wrongly eliminating all competitors of Swiss-based company. Two bids were received for TSR contract from Swiss Timing and MSL Spain and they were opened on 4 November 2009. However, much before that, on 12 October 2009, Kalmadi and Verma had announced that the contract would be awarded to Swiss Timing.

==== Trial ====
On 4 February 2013, the court of special CBI judge Ravinder Kaur found sufficient prima facie evidence and ordered framing of charges against all the accused. The charges framed were: cheating, forgery, criminal conspiracy and causing a loss of over Rs 900 million under the Prevention of Corruption Act. As the accused pleaded not guilty, the court ordered that daily Criminal trial (for 5 days a week) began from 20 February.

=== Queen's Baton Relay (QBR) case ===
The QBR event was held on 29 October 2009. The allegation was that, the Organising Committee (OC) awarded the work of transportation in QBR event to AM Car and Van Hire Ltd at excessively high rates without following a standard tender process.

After completing investigations, CBI filed its second charge-sheet (after the charge-sheet in TSR case) in a special CBI court in Delhi. The CBI named OC officials T S Darbari, Sanjay Mohindroo, Jeychandran and London-based businessman Ashish Patel and his two companies AM Car n Van Hire and AM Films. The chargesheet alleged that OC members conspired to award contracts of local transportation and others to Patel's companies at excessive rates during the event held in London in 2009.

The accused were charged under Indian Penal Code sections relating to criminal conspiracy to cheat and forgery along with violations of Prevention of Corruption Act.

=== Venue development support case ===
A Swiss company was awarded a contract of over ₹700 million (US$7.5 million) for providing venue development support services to the Organising Committee (OC). However, it was alleged that Prime Minister appointed VK Shunglu Committee found serious cases of forgery and irregularity with the contract. The committee said that, "Undue pressure was brought within the OC for engaging the company for the contract" and recommended that CBI or ED should take up the case for appropriate action.

Based on Shunglu Committee's findings, CBI registered an FIR against Suresh Kalmadi, Lalit Bhanot and AK Mattoo on 23 August 2012.

On 23 March 2014, the Hindustan Times reported that "...the investigation into the alleged irregularities committed is stumbling with the CBI having closed its FIR related to grant of two contracts to a Swiss firm for lack of evidence."

=== Other cases ===
CBI sources revealed in July 2012 that the probe against alleged corruption in construction of Barapullah Flyover and grant of Bail-out Package to EMAAR MGF is likely to be closed in the absence of substantiating evidence.

== See also ==
- List of scandals in India
- Concerns and controversies over the 2008 Summer Olympics
- Concerns and controversies over the 2010 Winter Olympics
- Contractor Mafias — construction mafias, part of the Mafia Raj in India
- Corruption in India
- Indian political scandals
- The Lokpal Bill, 2011
- Jan Lokpal Bill
- 1992 Indian stock market scam
- NSE co-location scam
