= The Caravan =

Indian monthly magazine

- February 2024 issue of The Caravan
- Editor: Paresh Nath (editor-in-chief); Anant Nath (editor); Vinod K. Jose (executive editor; 2009–2023); Hartosh Singh Bal (executive editor from 2023)
- Categories: Politics, culture
- Frequency: Monthly
- Circulation: 40,000 (2010)
- Publisher: Paresh Nath
- Founder: Vishwa Nath
- Founded: 1940; 86 years ago
- Company: Delhi Press
- Country: India
- Based in: Delhi
- Language: English
- Website: caravanmagazine.in
- ISSN: 0008-6150

The Caravan is an Indian English-language, long-form narrative journalism magazine covering politics and culture. It was initially launched in 1940 by Vishwa Nath, becoming a prominent monthly magazine before ceasing publication in 1988. The magazine was revived in 2009 by Anant Nath, who aimed to create a platform for South Asia's literary talents with an emphasis on politics, art, and culture. Since then, it has received multiple awards, including the Louis M. Lyons Award for Integrity in Journalism.

Caravan has faced numerous defamation lawsuits, which are both costly and lengthy. In 2011, it was sued by IIPM for ₹50 crore, leading to a court-ordered takedown of an article, which was later republished in 2018. The magazine faced legal action in 2015 from Essar Group over claims that the company had given gifts to influential individuals. In 2019, Ajit Doval's son Vivek Doval filed a criminal defamation case against the Indian National Congress leader Jairam Ramesh and Caravan Magazine for their alleged defamatory statements and article against him. Jairam Ramesh tendered an apology to Vivek Doval before a Delhi court. The magazine and several of its editors were also charged with sedition in 2021 for their reporting on a farmer's death during the Indian farmers' Republic Day protest.

== History ==
In 1940, Vishwa Nath launched Caravan as the first magazine from the Delhi Press; it went on to establish itself as a leading monthly but closed in 1988.

It was again revived in 2009 by Anant Nath, the grand son of Vishwa Nath; Nath was deeply impressed by publications like The Atlantic, Mother Jones etc. during his graduation from Columbia University and sought for The Caravan to be a home for South Asia's rich literary talents. In Nath's words, "the idea was [] to have a magazine on politics, art, and culture, with a liberal bend of mind." A few months later, Vinod Jose was roped in as the executive editor; drawing inspiration from long-form American magazines such as Harper's and The New Yorker, he designed the magazine as the home for New Journalism in India. The establishment was successful and its earliest issues featured a host of South Asian Anglophone writers — Pankaj Mishra, Arundhati Roy, and Fatima Bhutto among others.

Gradually, both Nath and Jose planned to cover stories that were ignored by mainstream media — Siddhartha Deb notes the magazine to have simultaneously carried traits of being a newsweekly, book review forum, and a litzine, during those days. By 2010, the journal had become a monthly and the print-circulation exceeded 40,000; Jonathan Shainin joined the same year as an associate editor. Beginning 2014, with the rise of Narendra Modi in national politics, the magazine has become almost exclusively focused on politics — Nath explains this as a product of mainstream media's increasing reticence to be critical of the government.

As of 2020, the magazine employs 38 people and the website gets about 1.5 million pageviews per month.

== Reception ==
Jose's profile of Narendra Modi in the March 2012 issue won international acclaim and was referenced by The Washington Post, The Wall Street Journal, The Guardian, Le Monde, and The New York Times. Dexter Filkins, writing for The New Yorker in 2019, noted that The Caravan provided generally critical coverage of the incumbent Bharatiya Janata Party government, notwithstanding state intimidation.

In summer 2020, Virginia Quarterly Review commissioned a feature on the magazine, which introducing it as a publication committed to "protecting India's tradition of democracy and religious pluralism", reiterated Filkin's observation and emphasized the relevance of the publication at a time when the traditional mainstream media had all but buckled before the government. That The Caravan did not receive advertisements from the government, it was not possible for the government to use the traditional "carrot and stick" approach.

=== Awards ===
==== Individual journalists ====
Multiple journalists have received awards for their reportage published in The Caravan.

In 2010, Mehboob Jeelani won a Ramnath Goenka Award for his profile of Syed Ali Geelani. In 2011, Jose won a Ramnath Goenka Award for his profiles of Prime Minister Manmohan Singh and DMK patriarch M. Karunanidhi; two years later, he was conferred with the Osborn Elliott Prize by the Asia Society for two articles — one on the rebranding of Narendra Modi after the Gujarat Riots, and the other on media ethics. In 2011, Christophe Jaffrelot had also won the Ramnath Goenka Award for a series of op-eds. In 2012, Samanth Subramanian was conferred with Red Ink Award in the category of political reporting as well as media reporting by the Mumbai Press Club for his profiles of Subramanian Swamy and Samir Jain respectively.

In 2014, the publication swept Red Ink Awards — Dinesh Narayanan won two in the category of political reporting for a profile of Mohan Bhagwat and in the category of business reporting for a profile of Jignesh Shah, Leena Gita Reghunath won the one in the category of crime reporting for a profile of Swami Aseemanand, Salil Tripathi won the one in the category of human rights reporting for a discussion of the 1971 war-crimes in Bangladesh, Nikita Saxena won the one in the category of health reporting, and Rahul Bhatia won the one in the category of sports reporting for a profile of N. Srinivasan. Bhatia also won a Ramnath Goenka Award for the same article.

In 2018, Nileena M S won the ACJ Journalism Award in the category of investigative reporting for detailing the rampant corruption in the allocation of coal-blocks in Chhattisgarh and Rajasthan. The same year, Reghunath won a Red Ink Award for her reporting of gender-biases in Malayalam television under the women empowerment category while Aruna Chandrasekhar won another in the environment category for reporting on the tribal opposition to bauxite mining in Orissa. In 2019, Sagar won Red Ink Award in the category of political reporting for investigative reporting on the Rafale scam while Zishaan A Latif won a Ramnath Goenka Award for documenting the struggles of inclusion in NRC. In 2020, Prabhjit Singh and Arshu John's probings into the Delhi riots won them the ACJ Journalism Award in the category of investigative reporting. In 2021, Sagar won Red Ink Award in the category of crime reporting for his fact-checking of claims made by Central Bureau of Investigation in the context of Muzaffarpur shelter case.

==== Publication ====
In 2021, the publication was conferred with the Louis M. Lyons Award for Conscience and Integrity in Journalism by the Nieman Foundation for Journalism's class of the year at Harvard University; the citation highlighted Caravan's "commitment to conscience and integrity" notwithstanding intimidatory tactics by the state.

== Legal issues ==
In addition to receiving threatening messages, the magazine has been sued repeatedly for alleged defamation. These lawsuits are costly and typically take years to fight in court. In 2011, the magazine was the subject of a ₹50 crore (equivalent to ₹103 crore or US$11 million in 2023) defamation suit by the Indian Institute of Planning and Management after it featured a profile of its head, Arindam Chaudhuri. The court awarded an interim injunction to Chaudhuri, ordering the magazine to take the article off its website. In 2018, the Delhi High Court vacated the injunction, allowing the magazine to re-publish the article.

The magazine was issued legal notices in April 2013 regarding its May cover story about Attorney General Goolam Essaji Vahanvati but the top three editors decided to continue with its publication.

In 2015, The Caravan was served a legal notice by the Essar Group because the magazine described the business and the family that runs it unfavorably, including evidence that the business gave iPads to 195 journalists, government employees, and politicians. Essar later filed a ₹250 crore (equivalent to ₹377 crore or US$39 million in 2023) civil defamation suit against the magazine; the business did not deny any of the facts presented in the magazine article.

In 2016, following the Indian government's demonetization of ₹500 and ₹1,000 notes, The Caravan published an article claiming that Vivek Doval, son of National Security Adviser Ajit Doval, was involved with a hedge fund in the Cayman Islands. In January 2019, Vivek Doval filed a defamation complaint against the magazine and Congress leader Jairam Ramesh for allegedly repeating these defamatory claims. Ramesh had highlighted the article's content during a press conference, which led Doval to assert that the statements were false and damaged his reputation. In December 2020, Ramesh apologized in court, admitting that his remarks were based on the article and recognizing the need for fact verification. The court accepted the apology, closing the case against Ramesh, while the defamation proceedings against The Caravan are ongoing.

In 2021, many journalists and politicians who reported the death of Navreet Singh during the 2021 Farmers' Republic Day parade were charged with sedition by the Delhi Police and the police departments of three Bharatiya Janata Party–ruled states. The police cases were filed against editor and founder Paresh Nath, editor Anant Nath, executive editor Vinod K. Jose and one unnamed person for filing fake news about the cause of death of the farmer. Those charged also included Congress MP Shashi Tharoor, India Today journalist Rajdeep Sardesai, National Herald senior consulting editor Mrinal Pande and Qaumi Awaz editor Zafar Agha. Varadarajan has called the police FIR "malicious prosecution". The Press Club of India (PCI), the Editors Guild of India, the Press Association, the Indian Women's Press Corps (IWPC), the Delhi Union of Journalists and the Indian Journalists Union in a joint press conference asked the sedition law to be scrapped. The Editors Guild of India spoke against invoking of the sedition charge on journalists. The guild termed the FIRs as an "attempt to intimidate, harass, browbeat and stifle the media".

In March 2023, The Caravan was accused of plagiarism after Netherlands-based artist Tijana claimed her artwork of featuring External Affairs Minister, S. Jaishankar was used on the magazine's cover without permission. The magazine later issued an apology, attributing the incident to a freelance artist and adding credit to Tijana with her consent.

In February 2024, The Caravan published a piece, "Screams from the Army Post", alleging that members of the Indian army had tortured civilians in Jammu and Kashmir. The Indian government ordered them to take down the story under the Information Technology Act.

== Criticism ==
In 2019, following the Pulwama attack, The Caravan published an article analyzing the caste composition of the 40 personnel killed, noting that most were from OBC, SC, and ST backgrounds with limited upper-caste representation. The article drew sharp criticism from figures including CRPF's chief spokesperson, Moses Dhinakaran, who called it "divisive", and Union Minister Rajnath Singh, who emphasized that forces should not be viewed through caste or religious lines. Former Jammu and Kashmir Chief Minister Mehbooba Mufti and others echoed similar concerns, while some defended the article, citing ongoing caste influences in the armed forces.
