= Chalapati =

Chalapati or Chalapathi is an Indian masculine given name.

Notable people with this name are:

- Jonnalagedda Chalapati, officer in the Indian Air Force
- I. V. Chalapati Rao, Indian scholar, public speaker, and teacher
- Pappala Chalapathirao, Indian politician
- Gudlavalleti Chalapati Rao, Indian writer and philosopher
- T. Chalapathi Rao, Indian music composer who worked in Telugu cinema
- Chalapathi Rao, Indian actor and producer known for comedy and villainous roles in Telugu cinema
- Manikonda Chalapathi Rau, Indian journalist
