= The UnReal Times =

- Website type: News Satire
- Available in: English
- Creators: Karthik Laxman and C.S. Krishna
- Website: theunrealtimes.com
- Commercial: No
- Launched: 14 April 2011; 15 years ago
- Current status: Inactive

"The UnReal Times" was an Indian satire, spoof, parody and humour portal featuring satirical articles on politics, entertainment, cricket, media, international affairs and society. Founded in 2011, the portal publishes fake news reports, comic strips, mock transcripts, fake Facebook and Twitter conversations among other formats, combining irreverent humour with biting satire in its commentary on current events. The Unreal Times has been referred to as The Onion of India (after American satire portal The Onion), most notably by tech blog makeuseof.com. The Unreal Times shut down in November, 2016 for unknown reasons.

== History ==
The UnReal Times was initiated on 14 April 2011, when the founders CS Krishna and Karthik Laxman wrote an article titled "Government mulls direct cash transfers by dropping money bags from the sky" jibing the government's direct cash transfer schemes. After the article's positive reception, the founders booked the domain name www.theunrealtimes.com, created the first version of The UnReal Times and began to publish one satirical article per day.

Through social media websites, Facebook and Twitter, the website began to gain traction and grew in popularity, aided from time to time by viral articles such as "Manmohan Singham", "BCG hires McKinsey to advise it on how to become number 1", "Journalist mistakenly interviews Bollywood actor Imran Khan instead of Pakistani cricket legend", and "Stunning Revelation: West Indies' Cricket captain, Darren Sammy, is a Tamil Brahmin!". The website became inactive on 30 November 2016 shortly after the 2016 United States Presidential Election and the 2016 Indian banknote demonetisation.

In 2017, URT columnist Ashwin Kumar launched a weekly satire series titled Unreal Missions that ran for ten episodes.

== Features and columnists ==
The UnReal Times features a variety of article formats including fake news reports, mock transcripts of cabinet meetings and cricket dressing room conversations, picture series, fake Facebook wall snippets, fake Tweet series and videos. The picture series format is particularly popular among readers, and the columnist responsible for its popularity, Ashwin Kumar, is regarded as one of the top writers in this genre. Other popular columnists are Ajayendar Reddy, whose article on Dr. Raghuram Rajan was referenced in mainstream media, Anand Walunjkar, Divya Srikanth, Lokesh Bahety, Pankaj Vaidya, Pritam Chatterjee, and Srini Chandra. Some columnists write under pen names, among them are D-MAN, Hitler Swamy, MedWarrior and Insane Insaan. The editors write under the pen name UnReal Mama.

== Media coverage ==
The UnReal Times has been mentioned in mainstream media several times:

- Outlook magazine, in one of its articles, said, "...on the other hand, it has also inspired some brilliant satire in web magazines like The UnReal Times which almost daily brings out rollicking spoofs on the Gandhis and Congress luminaries..."
- India Today in a feature on The UnReal Times says, "Do we have the ability to laugh at ourselves? Two IIMA graduates are testing our humour quotient with a website that pokes fun at all and sundry, especially politicians..."
- Firstpost based one of its articles on an UnReal Times spoof titled "Kejriwal widens attacks, demands thorough probe into how Priyanka Gandhi could fall for a chap like Vadra".
- The Economist cited articles from The Unreal Times in its article on political satire in India

The UnReal Times or its articles have also been featured or linked to in DNA, Sydney Morning Herald, Bloomberg and New York Times.

== Controversies ==
In August 2011, The UnReal Times released a video titled Manmohan Singham, featuring Prime Minister Dr. Manmohan Singh (morphed over Singham protagonist Ajay Devgn) as an action hero fighting evils such as inflation, corruption, terrorism and so on. The video went viral on Facebook and Twitter, and was also shared by Ajay Devgn on his Twitter and Facebook page. However, Congress party workers in some states filed complaints with cyber crime cells of their respective states.

In early 2013, an UnReal Times article on IIPM founder Arindam Chaudhuri titled "Dare to think beyond Google: Arindam Chaudhuri launches Ponytail Search" was blocked by the Department of Telecom along with over 70 other URLs on the basis of a court order after Arindam Chaudhari sought legal action against pages critical of his organization.

== Books ==
In April 2014, the founders of The UnReal Times launched Unreal Elections a satirical novel published by Penguin Random House. The book traces key political events in the year leading to General Elections 2014 with imaginative and fictitious accounts of backroom machinations, eventually resulting in an unexpected climax towards the end. The book received positive reviews in mainstream media - Business Standard wrote that the book "will leave you breathless with waves of irresistible and uncontrollable laughter". Mid-day.com wrote: "Be prepared to laugh a lot at the humorous proceedings but also to feel a tinge of sadness about the murkiness of politics".

In 2016, a second novel titled UnReal Aliens was released. The book was a satirical take on aliens visiting India.

== See also ==
- List of satirical magazines
- List of satirical news websites
- List of satirical television news programs
