= Iyyanki =

Iyyanki (Telugu: అయ్యంకి) is a Telugu surname. Notable people with the surname include:

- Iyyanki Venkata Ramanayya (1890–1979), Indian librarian and activist
- Iyyanki Venkata Chalapati Rao (1923–2016), Indian scholar, public speaker, teacher and editor
