= Rupa Gulab =

Indian writer

Rupa Gulab is an Indian author and columnist. She has written eight books, predominantly chick lit, young adult and children's literature. Her articles have frequently appeared in Deccan Chronicles, Asian Age, National Herald and Kochi Post.

== Popularity and reception as an author ==
Despite the initial mixed reception, Gulab's debut Girl Alone has been noted as one of the pioneering chick lit novels in Indian English fiction. Her sophomore novel Chip of the Old Blockhead was recommended by IBBY's magazine as a "frothing and light" depiction of "adult world of double standards, marital estrangement and divorce."

Critics have highlighted the sensitive exploration of subjects such as adoption, modern parenting and post-divorce childhood in her novels.

Daddy Come Lately was included in 101 Indian Children's Novels We Love! In 2017, Hot Chocolate is Thicker than Blood was shortlisted for Crossword Jury Award.

== Works ==
• Girl Alone (2005)

• Chip of the Old Blockhead (2006)

• The Great Depression of 40s (2010)

• I Kissed a Frog (2013)

• Daddy Come Lately (2013)

• Simmi's Mum's Diary (2015)

• Hot Chocolate is Thicker than Blood (2016)

• Sandy to the Rescue (2016)
