= Zafar Agha =

Indian journalist (1954–2024)

- Born: 1954; Allahabad, Uttar Pradesh, India
- Died: 22 March 2024 (aged 69–70); Fortis Hospital, New Delhi, India
- Education: University of Allahabad
- Occupations: Journalist and columnist
- Known for: Chief Editor of Qaumi Awaz, Navjivan

Zafar Agha (1954 – 2024, Urdu: ظفر آغا) was an Indian journalist and columnist. He was the editor of Urdu Newspaper Qaumi Awaz, Navjivan and former editor of the National Herald.

== Early life and background ==
Agha was born in 1954 in Allahabad, attended Yadgar E Hussaini Intermediate College and Allahabad University. While studying English literature, he became involved in the progressive student movement at Allahabad University. He maintained his allegiance to left and democratic politics for the rest of his life.

== Career ==
Zafar Agha embarked on his journalism journey in 1979 with the Link magazine, dedicating over 45 years to the profession. Throughout his career, he contributed to publications such as the Patriot and the Business and Political Observer, served as political editor at India Today, and worked with ETV and the Inquilab Daily. Agha's last role was with the National Herald group, initially as the editor of the Qaumi Awaz and subsequently as the editor-in-chief of the National Herald.

Furthermore, Agha actively participated in the Delhi Union of Journalists and held positions as a member and later as the officiating chairman of the National Commission for Minority Educational Institutions until 2017.

== Death ==
Agha died in New Delhi on Friday morning, 22 March 2024, in Fortis Hospital, Vasant Kunj, of a cardiac arrest.
