= Vinod Jose =

Indian investigative journalist and editor

Vinod K. Jose
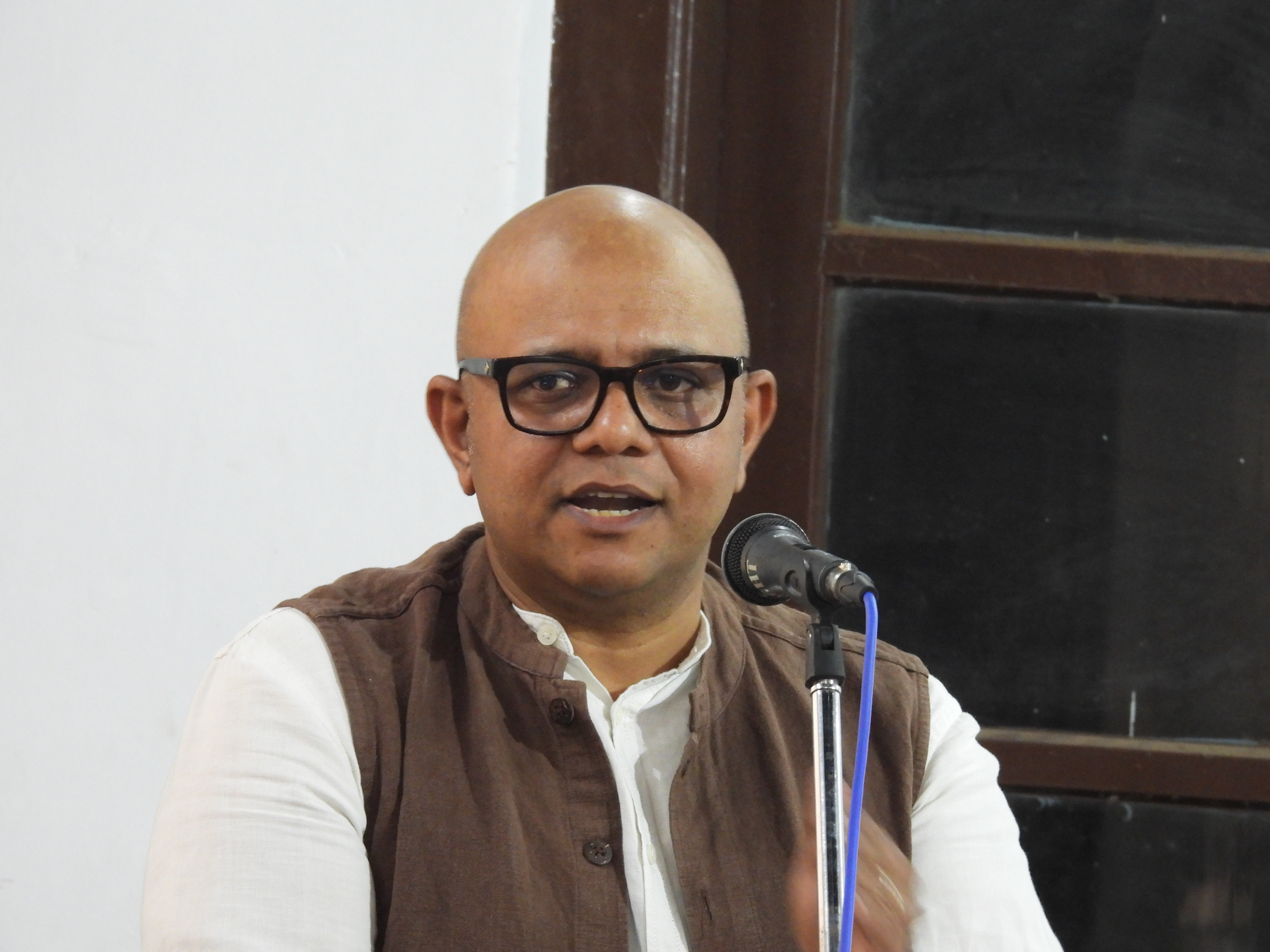
- Born: Vinod Kizhakkeparambil Joseph; Kerala, India
- Education: Manipal University, MA; Columbia University, MA; Jamia Millia Islamia, PhD; Harvard University, Radcliffe Fellow
- Occupations: Journalist, editor, magazine founder
- Years active: 2001–present
- Employer(s): Caravan Magazine (Delhi Press), since 2009; Free Press, 2003–2006; Radio Pacifica, 2002–2007; Indian Express, 2001
- Known for: his narrative journalism style and interviews
- Awards: Asia Society

Vinod K. Jose, or Vinod Kizhakkeparambil Joseph, (born 1980) is a journalist, editor, and magazine founder from India. In 2009, Jose was hired by Delhi Press to re-launch the company's 70-year-old title The Caravan, which was discontinued in 1988. He was the executive editor of The Caravan from 2009 to 2023, which calls itself "India's only narrative journalism magazine" and is published in the English-language in New Delhi. Earlier, he was the founding editor of the Malayalam-language publication Free Press. Jose's contributions to Indian journalism are in the area of narrative or literary journalism, similar to the style of Granta, The New Yorker, The Atlantic and Mother Jones. He has won several national and international awards for his work. Since he left The Caravan, Jose has been working on an investigative book on how political and economic power works in India. Jose is also the founder and director of the Wayanad Literature Festival, India's first and the largest rurally-held literature festival.

== Education ==
Vinod Jose Graduated with a degree in Communications from Manipal University in 2001. In 2008, he graduated with an MA from Columbia Journalism School, Columbia University, New York, where he was a Bollinger Presidential Fellow. He was awarded his PhD in Sociology in 2012 from Jamia Millia Islamia in New Delhi, India. Jose was also a Radcliffe Fellow at Harvard University.

== Career ==
Vinod K. Jose started as a city reporter with the Indian Express in New Delhi in 2001. From 2002 to 2007, Vinod Jose covered South Asia for public radio networks such as Pacifica Radio, NPR, Radio Australia and Asia Calling. Jose was also the founding editor of Free Press, a long-form investigative magazine published between 2003 and 2006 in the Malayalam language. At 23, Jose became one of the youngest editors of any current affairs registered magazine in India when he started Free Press (Office of the Registrar of Newspapers for India). After his journalism education in Columbia Journalism School, in 2009, Jose was hired by India's leading publisher Delhi Press to re-launch the company's 70-year-old title The Caravan, which had been discontinued in 1988.

In defence of narrative journalism, The Caravan ads a long-term perspective that it says other magazines are not providing. Jose told The Hindu,

Magazines are being unable to take advantage of the seven-day cycle. After watching 200 hours of results [in TV], news and analysis of UP elections, what is it that I gain by having five magazines on my desk at the end of the week? Editorial leadership is not being able to address this core issue, and advertisers can see it.

== Notable works of journalism ==
Vinod K. Jose first received attention for his reporting about those accused and those convicted in the 2001 Indian Parliament attack. As a reporter, he covered the attack the day of the attack, but he said his story was not published in 2001 because he had found so many contradictions. In 2005, Jose, who was at the time editing the Free Press, was questioned by the Crime Branch in New Delhi about articles that he had written about SAR Geelani, who had been accused and acquitted in the 2001 Indian Parliament attack. In 2006, Radio Pacifica correspondent Jose conducted an exclusive interview with Mulakat Afzal Guru while the convict awaited his execution inside the Tihar Jail. Later in 2006, he published a response on behalf of the Society for the Protection of Detainees' and Prisoners' Rights, which was seeking clemency for Afzal Guru. His original interview with Afzal was reprinted multiple times between 2006 and 2013, translated into 11 south Asian languages and other European languages such as Italian, and included in an edited book about the attack.

In the course of his reporting for Caravan, Jose filed a "Right to Information" application to make public the holdings of Kalanithi Maran's private holdings, which was eventually supported by the Central Information Commission in 2012. Maran's brother is former Telecom Minister Dayanidhi Maran, and India's Ministry of Information and Broadcasting initially denied the request until the CIC reversed the decision. The issue was reported widely at the time saying the CIC decision on the appeal was landmark by setting a precedent in India for opening up the private sector to public scrutiny.

In September 2012, The Washington Post published a correction that said its India bureau chief Simon Denyer had not sourced two statements from Vinod K. Jose's article about Prime Minister Manmohan Singh that first appeared in The Caravan. Sanjaya Baru, Singh's media advisor, said, "Simon Denyer quotes me in Washington Post without talking to me. He has merely rehashed what I told Caravan last year." Denyer did respond that he had failed to adequately give attribution to Jose's article. According to FirstPost, the ethical issue was that Denyer's article made it appear that Singh's representatives had told him something that he had actually told Vinod K. Jose of The Caravan in 2011.

Under Vinod Jose's leadership The Caravan became India's leading investigative journalism newsroom. The magazine brought out the 2010 Commonwealth Games scam in Delhi; a multi-billion coal allocation scam in 2011; a 2-year old investigation on Swamy Aseemanand, the Hindu priest who plotted five terrorist attacks in India that killed 117 people; the mysterious death of Judge Loya who in a murder case had refused to take a $15 million bribe offer to acquit the principal accused Amit Shah, who is Prime Minister Narendra Modi’s three-decade-long chief lieutenant; the credit benefits extended by public banks to Amit Shah's son; National Security Advisor Ajit Doval's son operating a company from the tax haven; payoffs amounting to over Rs 1,800 crore to the BJP’s national leaders, its central committee, and judges and advocates; the MeToo charge against the Chief Justice of India, Ranjan Gogoi etc. The investigations on the judicial corruption led to the start of the first ever impeachment process against the Chief Justice of India, Dipak Misra. In 2023, Vinod Jose announced leaving The Caravan after heading the newsroom for fourteen years.

== Selected works ==
- Vinod K. Jose, "Maoist India: The Search for Economic Justice," Pacifica Radio, 2006; Free Speech Radio News, 2009. (29 minutes) Jose's 2006 radio piece on Mao rebels was featured as an "encore presentation" three years later.
- Vinod K. Jose, "Falling Man: Manmohan Singh at the centre of the storm," Caravan Magazine, 1 October 2011. This 2011 story about Prime Minister Manmohan Singh was selected for the series "100 Great Stories" by the faculty and judges from stories by alumni from Columbia University's journalism school. The article was translated into French and reprinted in Le Monde. A reporter from The Washington Post failed in 2012 to source Jose's article and was criticised for an ethical lapse while the newspaper printed a correction.
- Vinod K. Jose, "The Emperor Uncrowned: The rise of Narendra Modi," Caravan Magazine, 1 March 2012 In the article, Jose provides a historical perspective on his subject Narendra Modi: "The transformation of Modi's image has been powered by a sophisticated public relations campaign, but the embellishments rest on a foundation of genuine accomplishment." Several journalists incorporated parts of Vinod Jose's article, including Simon Denyer's controversial use in The Washington Post and its attributed use by Shoma Chaudhury in a profile on Modi in Tehelka Magazine. A writer from the Wall Street Journal recommended the article and noted, "The piece coincides with the tenth anniversary of the bloody religious riots in the state, which left an indelible stain on the legacy of the chief minister." Ananya Vajpeyi, the author of Righteous Republic: The Political Foundations of Modern India, called Jose's profile on Modi "courageous". The Guardian considered Jose's profile on Modi a "carefully researched article", Le Monde called it "an uncompromising profile", while the New York Times India blog called it "exhaustive". A writer from News Laundry wrote, "Vinod K Jose's Caravan piece was undoubtedly far more exhaustive, informative and readable than the Wikipedia-with-colour story by Jyoti Thottam in Time."

== Awards ==
In 2014, Vinod K. Jose won the Ramnath Goenka Award for his profile on Prime Minister Manmohan Singh, titled "Falling Man".

In 2008, he had won a Foreign Press Association award from Carl Bernstein, awarded annually for young journalists in the United States for their outstanding academic and professional achievement.

In 2021, under Vinod's editorial leadership, The Caravan, won the prestigious Louis M. Lyons Award for Conscience and Integrity in Journalism. The Award, administered by Harvard University, said that the award was in recognition of the "unique and uncompromising coverage of the erosion of human rights, social justice, and democracy in India." " His work "River Deep, Mountain High", about espionage and lost plutonium in the Nanda Devi, was acknowledged with an "honorable mention" at the 2011 Kurt Schork Awards in International Journalism, Institute for War & Peace Reporting.

He was presented with an award for excellence in reporting by the Asia Society in 2013. Two articles from Jose were listed in the citation: "The Emperor Uncrowned: The Rise of Narendra Modi," which about how Modi reformed his reputation from the days of 2002 Gujarat violence into a prominent investment booster for Gujarat, India, and "On the Success of Ethics," which is about the changing relationship between public relations and traditional journalism and the possible role of ethics. Another magazine asked if it were ethical for a journalist writing about ethics begin the story by recounting his eavesdropping of the private communication of a public relations representative.
