= Mithya (2008 film) =

- Directed by: Rajat Kapoor
- Written by: Rajat Kapoor; Saurabh Shukla
- Produced by: Arindam Chaudhuri
- Starring: Ranvir Shorey; Neha Dhupia; Naseeruddin Shah; Vinay Pathak
- Cinematography: Rafey Mehmood
- Edited by: Suresh Pai
- Music by: Sagar Desai
- Release date: 8 February 2008
- Running time: 110 minutes
- Country: India
- Language: Hindi

Mithya (English: Illusion) is a 2008 Indian Hindi-language black comedy film co-written and directed by Rajat Kapoor and produced by Planman Motion Pictures. It stars Ranvir Shorey, Neha Dhupia, Naseeruddin Shah, and Vinay Pathak in pivotal roles. The score and soundtrack were composed by Sagar Desai. It was released on 8 February 2008, opening to good reviews.

== Plot ==
An extra (Ranvir Shourie) in Bollywood gets caught up with the wrong people because his face is identical to the underworld don, 'Raje' bhai (a slang for underworld don in Mumbai). An opposing gang seeing the opportunity plans to murder the don and replace him with the actor, who will sit at the helm of the don's empire and act as their puppet to help them take over the empire. The plan falls apart when the actor suffers a head injury during an accident and experiences amnesia.

Amidst the turmoil he starts believing the don's family and enemies to be his own and starts eliminating the rival gang. Will the opposing gang reveal his secret and ruin their own plan or will he take over the business and keep believing the illusion that he was accidentally introduced to?

Now the big question: if our "memory" stored in the "hippocampus" part of the brain is our "identity", who are we really?

== Cast ==
- Ranvir Shorey as VK/Rajendranath "Raje Bhai"
- Naseeruddin Shah as Gawde, Shetty's right hand
- Neha Dhupia as Sonam, VK's love interest
- Saurabh Shukla as Shetty, opposite gang leader
- Harsh Chhaya as Manu, Raje's brother
- Vinay Pathak as Ram, Shetty's henchman
- Brijendra Kala as Shyam, Shetty's henchman
- Manu Rishi as Nayak, Shetty's mole in Raje's gang
- Ikhlaq Khan as Abbas
- Iravati R Mayadev as Revati, Raje's wife
- Tinu Anand as Kuku Tola, Bollywood film producer
- Perin Malde as Tilak
- Pankaj Tripathi
- Rohit Pathak

== Production ==
It was first reported in August 2006 that Arindam Chaudhuri's Planman Motion Pictures was working on a new film. Actor-director Rajat Kapoor was to direct this venture that was to have criminal underworld as its basic premise. Naseeruddin Shah, Neha Dhupia and Ranvir Shourie were reported as its cast. Shooting for the film began in July 2006.

Sanchita Bhattacharya, the winner of 2006 singing reality show Sa Re Ga Ma Pa L'il Champs, made her singing debut in the Hindi cinema industry through this film. Director Kapoor and music director were quite convinced about her singing abilities. The producers hoped to use Bhattacharya's recent success while promoting the soundtrack.

Actress Neha Dhupia immediately accepted Kapoor's offer for the film. She considered Mithya to be among her best performances. Though it was evident from the initial media reports, some found her presence in the film rather surprising. By being good friends with director Kapoor, actor Ranvir Shorey found it better to work with him in this film.

== Release and reception ==
Mithya was first screened at the 9th Osian's Cinefan Festival of Asian and Arab Cinema. Although it was to feature at the 2007 Cannes Film Festival, the film was not complete by the nomination deadline. The organizers did not want to compromise on the quality of post-production by rushing through it.

The film's commercial release was on 8 February 2008. Having arrived at the box office with no expectations, Mithya didn't have a favorable opening in the initial days. Slowly the collections showed signs of improvement based on the word of mouth. Based on this, the trade analysts felt that the film would be able to recover its shoestring budget. By the end of the first week, it had a decent profit. Due to the film's offbeat nature, it did quite well mainly in Mumbai and New Delhi with collections exceeding Rs. 7.5 million (approximately US$167,000) and Rs. 6 million respectively.

In the subsequent two weeks, huge budget films such as Jodhaa Akbar caused a corresponding drop of 65% and 50% in the film's box office collections. However, by the fifth week, it had Rs. 52.5 million as its cumulative box office earnings. Trade analysts even called Mithya the dark horse of the first quarter of 2008.

While rating 4 out of 5 in his review, noted critic Rajeev Masand spoke highly about Rajat Kapoor's directorial abilities. He said that the film was a "brave, mature effort by a discerning director." Masand wrote highly about Ranvir Shorey by saying that the actor's performance "merits an impromptu ovation." In her review, well-known critic Nikhat Kazmi liked Kapoor's unconventional approach to the usual storyline. Besides appreciating Shorey for his performance, she had high regard for Neha Dhupia and rest of the ensemble cast. Other movie critics such as Taran Adarsh, Anupama Chopra and Raja Sen wrote generally good reviews for the film.
