= M. Chalapathi Rau =

Indian journalist and author

- Born: Manikonda Chalapathi Rau; 1908 or 1910; Visakhapatnam district, Madras Presidency, British India (present-day Andhra Pradesh, India)
- Died: 25 March 1983 (aged 73 or 75); Delhi, India
- Other names: M.C., Magnus
- Occupations: Journalist; Editor; Author
- Known for: Nehruvian thought

Manikonda Chalapathi Rau (1908 or 1910 – 25 March 1983) was an Indian journalist and author who served as the Editor-in-chief of the English daily National Herald from 1946 to 1978. He is regarded as one of the greatest editors in the history of Indian journalism. He worked as an assistant editor of Hindustan Times early in his career and his weekly column under the pseudonym 'Magnus' was one of the most widely read in the country. During the independence struggle he was a part of the underground press movement. He was also the author of several books on Indian journalism, politics, and personalities. He was awarded the Padma Bhushan, India's third-highest civilian award in 1968, but refused to accept it.

Chalapathi Rau was closely associated with the development of several press institutions in independent India. He was instrumental in the formation of Indian Federation of Working Journalists (IFWJ) and served as its first president from 1950 to 1955. He was a member of the Initiating Committee of the International Press Institute in 1950. He was also a member of the Government of India's goodwill mission to China in 1952. He was a friend and long-time associate of Jawaharlal Nehru and was the leader of the Indian Press Delegation, which accompanied Nehru on his historic 1955 tour of the USSR, Poland and Yugoslavia. He was a member of the UNESCO Press Experts Commission in 1956 and also worked on various UNESCO Commissions. He represented India in the United Nations General Assembly in 1958. Harinder Srivastava wrote a book on him titled "Magnus and the Muses''.

== Early life ==
Manikonda Chalapathi Rau was born in a Telugu-speaking Kapu family in Visakhapatnam district of present-day Andhra Pradesh. His birth year is variously given as either 1908 or 1910. His father was a police officer. Chalapathi Rau had his early education in Visakhapatnam district. He completed his M. A. degree in English Language and Literature from Presidency College, Madras in 1929. Later, he earned a law degree from Madras Law College.

== Career ==
=== Early career ===
After an apprenticeship under Pappu Somasundaram, a leader of the Madras Bar, Chalapathi Rau enrolled as an advocate in 1932. He shifted to Visakhapatnam and practised there for a short time. He organised a literary cultural association called Atheneum with Sarvepalli Radhakrishnan as President and himself as Secretary. He soon realised that his real interest was in literature and journalism, rather than in law or government service.

=== Journalistic career ===
in 1936, Chalapathi Rau joined as an Assistant Editor and leader-writer in The People’s Voice under K. Iswara Dutt in Madras. The People’s Voice was an organ of the People’s Party founded by the Maharaja of Pithapuram. After the paper ceased publication in 1937, he was invited by Dutt to Prayagraj, where he started a journal named The Week End. During this time, Chalapathi Rau also wrote for Triveni Quarterly, contributing reviews, translations and articles of literary and political interest.

Chalapathi Rau's political articles brought him to the attention of Jawaharlal Nehru. When Nehru founded National Herald in Lucknow in 1938 with K. Rama Rao as Editor, Chalapathi Rau joined its staff as an Assistant Editor and leader-writer. National Herald was considered the voice of India during the country’s fight for independence. As per Dasu Krishnamoorty, Rama Rao and Chalapathi Rau together made a formidable force in unearthing British conspiracies to deny independence to India. National Herald heeded to Mahatma Gandhi's call during the Quit India movement for newspapers to not censor themselves and voluntarily closed in 1942.

People think it is my paper. It really is Chalapathi Rau’s paper; he has made it what it is. He is the ablest journalist in India today.

— Jawaharlal Nehru at the Silver Jubilee function of National Herald.

Chalapathi Rau then moved to Delhi as one of the Assistant Editors of Hindustan Times under the editorship of Devdas Gandhi. Along with editorials, he wrote a weekly column titled 'Off the Record' under the pseudonym Magnus. Avadhanam Sita Raman, former editor of The Illustrated Weekly of India noted, "His column in Hindustan Times which he wrote every week under the pseudonym "Magnus" was the most widely read column in the country". While working for Hindustan Times, Devdas Gandhi once offered him a large salary hike. Chalapathi Rau was said to have declined the offer saying, "Devadasji, no, thanks. Don't spoil me".

After the revival of National Herald in November 1945, Chalapathi Rau returned to Lucknow as a Joint Editor, taking over as Editor on 1 July 1946. He continued as an editor at National Herald for 32 years from 1946 till 1978. From 1968 onwards, he worked from Delhi, where the paper had started its new edition. Despite being close to Nehru, he would criticise Nehru's policies in his editorials. He eschewed sensationalism relating to sex, crime, and scandal and emphasised integrity and social vision as journalistic values. He left the newspaper in 1978. After retiring from National Herald, he authored many books.

=== Other work ===
Chalapathi Rau organised the journalistic fraternity on trade union lines for the improvement of its working conditions. He served as the first president of the Indian Federation of Working Journalists (IFWJ) from 1950 to 1955. He also fought for the setting up of the first Press Commission on whose report the Wage Board was appointed which fixed the salaries and service conditions of journalists of all categories.

He was a friend of Nehru and was closely associated with the Nehru Memorial Museum & Library and the Nehru Foundation for the International Awards for Peace and Friendship. He was also associated with other publications as an Editor including The Gandhi Commemoration Volume (Gandhi Abhinandan Granth) and the Volume on Gurazada. A few weeks prior to his death, he joined as the Chief Editor of Meredian International, a non-political monthly in Delhi.

== Personal life ==
Chalapathi Rau was a bachelor. He had a simple lifestyle. He was known for his love for the English language and literature, Carnatic music, and Andhra pickles. He died of a heart attack in Delhi on 25 March 1983.

== Legacy ==
Rau was close to the prime minister and accompanied him on most important foreign visits as a representative of the newspaper, but he didn't crave a government position or sinecure. He held no post in the party, nor did he push for a nomination to the Upper House like many editors today.

— Shubhabrata Bhattacharya, former editor of National Herald on Chalapathi Rau in 2012.

Chalapathi Rau is regarded as one of the greatest editors in the history of Indian journalism.

Dasu Krishnamoorty wrote of him, "His reclusion, his integrity and learning and contempt for revenue-centred journalism explained why editors of his time had high regard for him." YV Ramakotaiah noted about him, "Manikonda Chalapathi Rau known for his fearless, unbiased and forceful writing remains the greatest Editor that English journalism in India has seen".

S. R. Nath called him 'India's greatest living editor' in 1966 and remarked as follows, "His articles on the Second World War created a sensation in those days; even to-day they serve as a textbook to aspirants in journalism. Being steeped in classics, Rau manifests a literary style which is individualistic; he converts journalism into literature."

== Bibliography ==
- Chalapathi Rau, M. Fragments of a revolution; essays on Indian problems. Oxford, New York, Pergamon Press [1965] [1st ed.]
- Chalapathi Rau, M. Gandhi and Nehru. Bombay, New York, Allied Publishers [1967]
- Govind Ballabh Pant, his life and times / M. Chalapathi Rau. New Delhi : Allied, 1981.
- India : portrait of a people / produced by India Tourism Development Corporation; commentary by M. Chalapathi Rau; design and picture editing by Zehra Tyabji and T. S. Nagarajan. New Delhi : Ministry of External Affairs, Govt. of India, c1976.
- Jawaharlal Nehru [by] M. Chalapathi Rau. [New Delhi] Publications Division, Ministry of Information and Broadcasting, Govt. of India [1973]
- Journalism and politics / M. Chalapathi Rau. New Delhi : Vikas, c1984.
- Magnus & muses : "off the record" musings of 'MC' (M. Chalapathi Rau) / compiled and edited by Harindra Srivastava. Gurgaon : Academic Press, 1980.
- The press / M. Chalapathi Rau. New Delhi : National Book Trust, India, 1974.
- The press in India [by] M. Chalapathi Rau. Bombay, New York, Allied Publishers [1968]
- Selected works of Jawaharlal Nehru. [Advisory board: M. Chalapathi N. Y. Sharada Prasad, and B. R. Nanda;general editor: S. Gopal. New Delhi, Orient Longman [1972-
- Twenty-five years of Indian independence. Edited by Jag Mohan. Contributors: M. Chalapathi Rau [and others], Delhi, Vikas Pub. House [1973]
