= Simon Denyer =

British journalist

Simon Denyer is a British journalist, author, and wildlife conservationist. He served as a foreign correspondent and bureau chief for the Washington Post and for Reuters, including in Beijing, New Delhi, Washington, Islamabad, Nairobi, New York and London.

== Education ==
Denyer graduated from Lancing College in 1983. He earned a master of arts degree in economics from Trinity College, Cambridge in 1987.

== Career ==
Denyer joined Reuters as a journalist in London in 1992, later becoming bureau chief in Washington, New Delhi, Islamabad and Kabul; also serving as a correspondent in Nairobi, New York and London. He later joined the Washington Post as bureau chief in India, also serving as president of the Foreign Correspondents' Club of South Asia (2011-2013), later transitioning to China's bureau chief (2013-2018), and finally to Japan and the Koreas (2018-2021). Denyer had initially planned a departure from the Washington Post in July 2021, but was requested to stay an additional 2 months to cover the Tokyo Olympics.

Denyer joined WildAid, an environmental organization, as its Africa programme manager in October 2021.

=== Criticism of Manmohan Singh ===
Denyer faced criticism in 2012 for his article "India's “silent” prime minister becomes a tragic figure", in which he criticized former Indian Prime Minister Manmohan Singh. Singh’s media advisor, Pankaj Pachauri, posted in the online comments section after the article was posted, claiming Denyer did not get in contact with the Prime Minister’s Office to get their side of the story. Denyer countered, saying he had requested an interview with the PM three times and wanted to meet senior PMO officials but his requests were ignored or declined. Two quotes from the article first appeared in a 2011 article published by the Indian magazine The Caravan. The quotes appeared without citation on Denyer's article. Former media advisor Sanjaya Baru and Tushar Poddar, an economist from Goldman Sachs, distanced themselves from the attributed comments.

Denyer admitted that his quotes came from The Caravan but claimed that he spoke to Baru, who gave him permission to use the quotes. The Washington Post printed a correction.

=== Felicia Sonmez lawsuit ===
In August 2021, an accusation of sexual harassment against Denyer was made public by The Daily Beast in its coverage of Felicia Sonmez's lawsuit against the Post. Sonmez accused the newspaper of managerial hypocrisy for having barred her from covering stories on sexual assault because she had come out as a sexual assault survivor, while allowing an unnamed journalist, reported to be Denyer, to continue coverage of such stories despite the past accusation against him. A female reporter accused Denyer of having once sent her an unsolicited photo of his underwear-covered crotch. The Washington Post opened an investigation on Denyer and ruled no professional wrongdoing on Denyer's part that warranted dismissal and instead issued him a warning. The lawsuit was dismissed with prejudice in March 2022.

== Bibliography ==
- Foreign Correspondent: Fifty Years of Reporting South Asia (2008)
- Rogue Elephant: Harnessing the Power of India's Unruly Democracy (2014)

== Awards ==
In 2016, Denyer won the Hong Kong Human Rights Press Award for best English spot news story.

In 2017, Denyer, Emily Rauhala and Elizabeth Dwoskin shared the Overseas Press Club’s Bob Considine Award for best newspaper, news service or digital coverage of international affairs for a series called “Behind the Firewall”, detailing China’s system of censorship and digital surveillance.

In 2019, Denyer shared a merit award with Annie Gowen and Jasu Hu in the multimedia category at the Hong Kong Human Rights Press Awards for an article titled “Too Many Men", an examination of the effects of the gender imbalance in China and India.

Denyer was part of a Washington Post team who won the 2020 Pulitzer Prize for Explanatory Reporting for a series titled "2°C: Beyond The Limit".

== See also ==
- Me Too movement
