= Jonathan Shainin =

British journalist

- Employers: The Guardian; The New Yorker
- Known for: Editor of The Long Read at The Guardian (2014-19)

Jonathan Shainin is a journalist and former editor of the Guardian long read. For several years, he was at The New Yorker as a staff writer and fact-checker. Between 2010 and 2013, he acted as senior editor at The Caravan in Delhi before returning to The New Yorker to take up a position as news editor. Shainin was the editor of the Long Read from its inception in 2014. As editor of the Long Read at The Guardian, Shainin expanded the section and helped to bring back the long form article into a large British newspaper. Shainin has said that 'longform stories tend to defy the theory of short attention spans online.'

In 2002, Shainin co-authored The Other Israel: Voices of Refusal and Dissent, with Roane Carey and Tom Segev. It was published by The New Press.

Media offices
Preceded by unknown	Staff writer, The New Yorker; 2008-10	Succeeded by unknown
Preceded by unknown	Senior Editor, The Caravan; 2010-13	Succeeded by unknown
Preceded by None	Editor, The Guardian long read 2014-19	Succeeded by Unknown
