= Gudlavalleti Chalapati Rao =

Gudlavalleti Venkata Chalapati Rao
- G.V.Chalapati Rao
- Born: 10 February 1915; Gudlavalleru, Andhra Pradesh, India
- Died: 30 October 1987 (aged 72); Machilipatnam
- Occupations: Deputy Collector, author, philosopher
- Parent(s): Venkata Ramaih Gudlavalleti and Suryakantham Gudlavalleti

Gudlavalleti Chalapati Rao or Gudlavalleti Venkata Chalapati Rao (వేంకట చలపతి రావు) was a noted writer, philosopher and an ex Deputy commissioner of Endowments Department in the Government of Andhra Pradesh. He was born in 1915 at Gudlavalleru, Krishna District, Andhra Pradesh to Venkata Ramaih Gudlavalleti and Suryakantham Gudlavalleti. He graduated from Andhra University (Bachelor of Arts) and also took a law degree from Madras University (Bachelor of Law). After his education, he served in the Revenue, Employment & Training and Endowments Departments, finally retired as Selection Grade Deputy Collector, finally settling down at Machilipatnam, Andhra Pradesh. He was married to Krishnaveni amma Gudlavalleti and has three sons and a daughter.

He authored several books on Temples of Srikakulam, Vishaka (including Vizianagaram), East and West Godavari Districts of Andhra Pradesh.

He also rendered Adhyatma Ramayanam from Sanskrit into Telugu and Sri Rama Charita Manas of Tulasidas from Hindi to Telugu. The Andhra Pradesh Sahitya Academy recognized his contribution and gave a cash grant for his "Adhyatma Ramayanam and his famous poem is."

== Works and Publications ==
- Ramadas of Bhadrachalam, released on 18 October 1980
- Sri Rama Charita Manas of Tulasidas, translated from Hindi into Telugu
- Adhyatma Ramayanam, rendered from Sanskrit into Telugu
- Sri Venkatachala, its glory, Tirumalai-Tirupati Devasthanam, 1983
- Temples of Vizianagaram District
- Temples of East and West Godavari District
- Temples of Srikakulam District
