= K. Rama Rao =

Kotamaraju Rama Rao
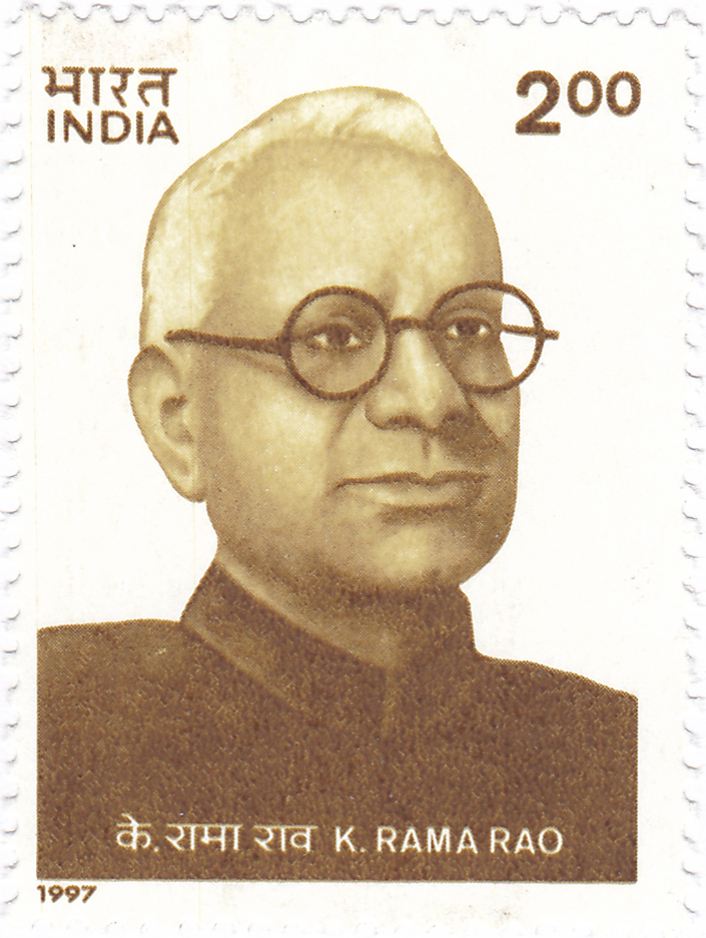
- Born: 9 November 1896; Chirala in present-day Bapatla district, Andhra Pradesh
- Died: 3 March 1961 (aged 64)
- Known for: National Herald

Kotamaraju Rama Rao (9 November 1896 – 3 March 1961) was an Indian journalist, editor, and freedom fighter. He was the first editor of National Herald, the English-language newspaper established by Jawaharlal Nehru. He was elected to the first Rajya Sabha as a Congress nominee from the undivided state of Madras in 1952. He was the first-ever advisor on 'Plan Publicity' to the Nehru government in 1956 and also served as a member of the Press Council of India and Vice-Chairman of Working Journalists Union.

Rama Rao worked in Lala Lajpat Rai's publication 'The People' and over 25 newspapers in various cities of pre-independence India, including Lahore and Karachi. He was jailed in August 1942 for six months by the British government for criticizing the torture of Satyagrahis in Lucknow camp jail. National Herald was banned in 1942 by the British during the Quit India movement and was revived in 1945. Rama Rao was the editor of it from 1938 to 1942, and from 1945 to 1946. He died on 3 March 1961.

Mahatma Gandhi called him a "fighting-editor" when he was working with him in Sevagram ashram. Atal Bihari Vajpayee called him the "Dronacharya of Indian Journalism". India Post issued a stamp in 1997 to celebrate his birth centenary. His autobiography was titled The Pen As My Sword. A statue of Rama Rao was installed at Bapatla in July 2019.
