= Arindam Chaudhuri =

Indian businessman, founder of a diploma mill

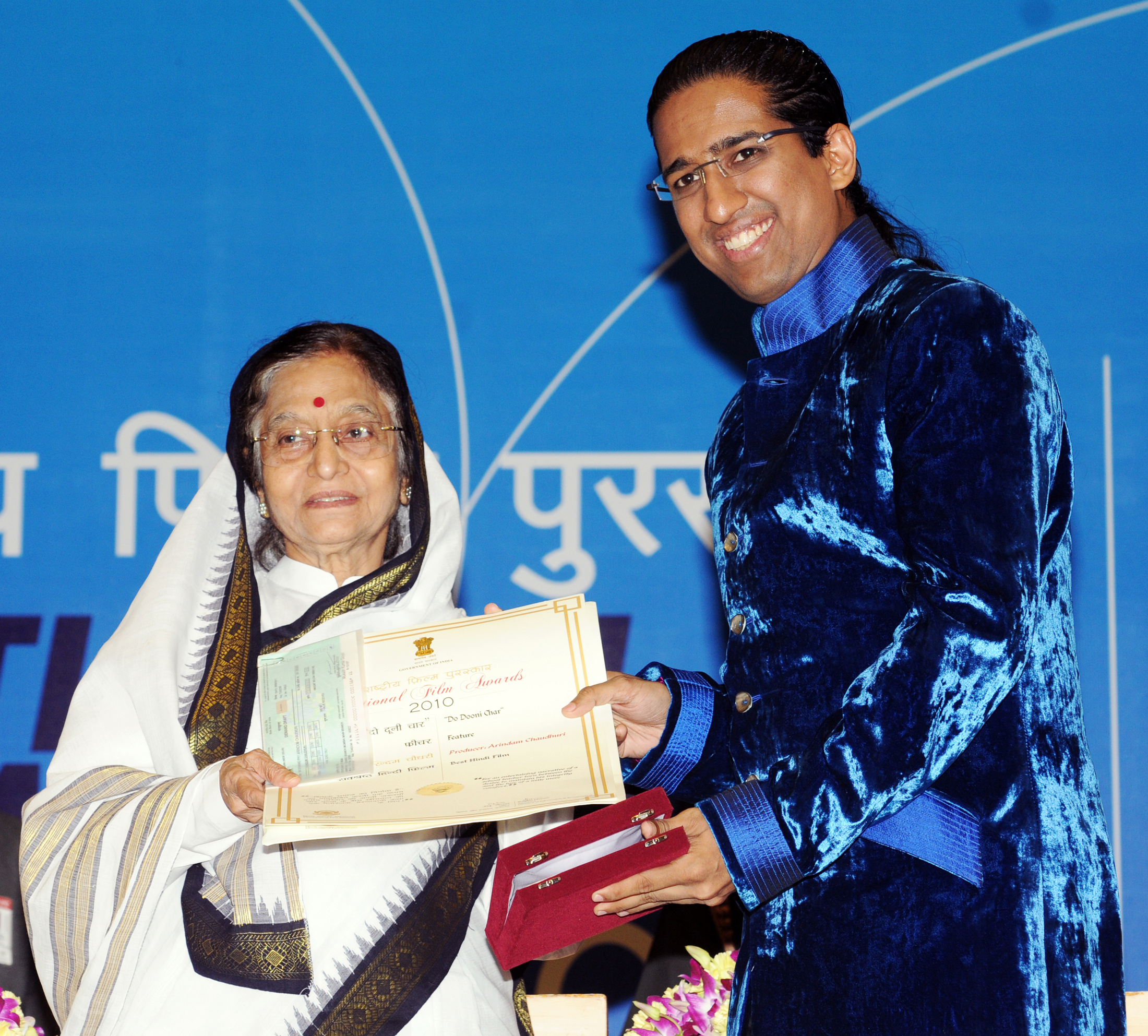
- Arindam Chaudhuri (right)
- Born: 8 December 1971 (age 54)
- Education: Indian Institute of Planning and Management
- Spouse: Rajita Chaudhuri
- Parent: Malay Chaudhuri

Arindam Chaudhuri is an Indian national best known for his involvement with the now-defunct Indian Institute of Planning and Management, an unaccredited institute that was previously headquartered in New Delhi and had 18 branches across India. The institute has been widely criticized for false advertisements and fraudulent practices. On 23 August 2020, Chaudhuri was arrested for tax evasion of ₹230 million (US$2.5 million).

== Biography ==
Arindam is the son of Malayendra Kisor Chaudhuri, who founded the Indian Institute of Planning and Management (IIPM) in 1973. He received his post graduate diploma in Planning and Entrepreneurship from the now defunct IIPM in 1992 He later became the Honorary Dean for the IIPM Centre for Economic Research and Advanced Studies. Also in 2004, Arindam Chaudhuri was appointed as a member (social and agricultural sector) of the Consultative Committee for the Planning Commission, Government of India. He is the founder of Planman Consulting and Great Indian Dream Foundation, a social sector organisation. He is also the owner of the Delhi franchise of the i1 Super Series motor sports league.

The film Rok Sako To Rok Lo saw Arindam debut as a movie producer and director. Planman Motion Pictures went on to produce Bengali movies Sanjhbatir Rupkathara (2002), Dosar (2006) and the National Film Award winner Faltu (2006). Planman also produced two more Hindi movies Mithya (2008), starring Ranvir Shorey, Neha Dhupia, Naseeruddin Shah and Vinay Pathak. Another movie produced by them, The Last Lear was awarded the National Film Award for Best Film in English in the year 2009 by the Government of India.

== Court cases ==
=== Found to be awarding MBA degrees under false pretences ===
In September 2014, acting on a public interest litigation, high court censured IIPM and Arindam Chaudhuri for misleading students. The court noted that IIPM was promoting an impression that it had recognition from a foreign management institute—International Management Institute (IMI), Belgium. The court found that in fact IMI had been set up by Arindam Chaudhuri and his father Malay Chaudhuri and was not even recognized by the laws of Belgium.

In July 2015, IIPM announced that it will stop offering education programmes directly, and shut down all its campuses outside Delhi. It will operate only as a research and training institute in Delhi.

=== Student sues for refund for unaccredited degree ===
On 4 June 2013 a case was registered against Arindam Chaudhuri and five other persons at Hazratganj police station of Lucknow. IPC sections 418, 420, 465, 471 and 506 had been pressed against six people.

=== Lawsuits against Caravan, Google, Penguin ===
In February 2011, a book excerpt on Arindam Chaudhuri published in the Caravan magazine and the chapter from the book (The Great Gatsby: A Rich Man in India) on which the excerpt was based, were removed following a preliminary injunction order by a court against Caravan, author Siddhartha Deb and the book publisher Penguin Books, in response to a lawsuit citing "grave harassment and injury". On 15 Feb 2013 Chaudhari was able to get 73 URLs which were critical of Indian Institute of Planning and Management (IIPM) blocked by a court order in India, including that of University Grants Commission (UGC) page with guidelines on IIPM, links carrying such content on newspaper, consumer forum and satire websites, as well as online news portals. The UGC page included a public notice stating that IIPM was not a university recognized by it, and that it could not confer or grant degrees. In January 2013, a court in Gwalior ordered the Department of Telecommunications to block several URLs of several with content critical of IIPM. The blocked webpages included the public notice on the UGC website. Other blocked URLs included content from The Indian Express, The Economic Times, The Times of India, The Wall Street Journal, Outlook Magazine, FirstPost, Rediff, The Caravan Magazine, as well as satirical websites such as Faking News and The UnReal Times. Chaudhuri had earlier obtained an injunction from a court in Silchar against the publishing of an article about him and the IIPM in Caravan magazine. This censorship was called a clear abuse of the judicial process by legal experts in the media, and led to outrage in traditional as well as social media. The online community responded with a counter-offensive against IIPM and Chaudhuri, calling attention worldwide to what the institute wanted purged. Chaudhuri defended the legal action against UGC and the media, saying that the UGC and AICTE are "full of bribe-seeking corrupt officials". The Dabra court near Gwalior ordered the unblocking of the links which were blocked previously on the basis of the review petition filled by the Department of Telecommunications.

== Awards ==
- Best Hindi Film for Do Dooni Chaar, National Film Awards, 2011.
- Best Feature Film in English for The Last Lear, National Film Awards, 2007.
- Best Film on Family Welfare for Faltu, National Film Awards, 2006.
- The Priyadarshini Memorial Award for Excellent contribution to Management from the Priyadarshini Academy, Mumbai in 2006
- Example to Youth award from the District Rotaract Council, a part of Rotary International, in 2004
