= Qaumi Awaz =

Urdu newspaper

- Founder: Jawaharlal Nehru
- Publisher: The Associated Journals Limited
- Editor-in-chief: Zafar Agha (till death)
- Founded: November 1937
- Ceased publication: 2008
- Language: Urdu
- Sister newspapers: The National Herald, Navjivan
- Website: http://www.qaumiawaz.com/

Qaumi Awaz (transl. voice of the nation) was an Urdu language newspaper published in India by Associated Journals Limited, which was started by Jawaharlal Nehru in November 1937. It was shut down in 2008 because the company was incurring losses. Its sister publications are the National Herald newspaper in English and Navjivan in Hindi. On 21 January 2016 the AJL in its meeting in Lucknow decided to relaunch the three dailies. In August 2017 Qaumi Awaz Digital Edition was launched.

Zafar Agha was the last chief editor of Qaumi Awaz.

== Lawsuits ==
In 2021, many journalists and politicians who reported about the death of Navreet Singh during the 2021 Farmers' Republic Day parade were charged with sedition by the Delhi police and 3 state police. The police cases were filed across three BJP-ruled states against journalists including Qaumi Awaz editor Zafar Agha. Varadarajan has called the police FIR "malicious prosecution". Press Club of India (PCI), the Editors’ Guild of India, the Press Association, the Indian Women's Press Corps (IWPC), the Delhi Union of Journalists and the Indian Journalists Union in a joint press conference asked the sedition law to be scrapped. Editors Guild of India spoke against invoking of the sedition charge on journalists. The guild termed the FIRs as an "attempt to intimidate, harass, browbeat and stifle the media".
