= Navjivan (newspaper) =

Indian newspaper

Navjivan India
- Type: Daily Newspaper
- Owner: The Associated Journal Limited
- Editor: Zafar Agha
- Founded: 1 November 1947; 78 years ago
- Relaunched: 1 June 2017
- Language: Hindi
- Headquarters: New Delhi
- City: New Delhi
- Country: India
- Sister newspapers: Qaumi Awaz (Urdu) and National Herald (English)
- Website: www.navjivanindia.com

Navjivan India (Hindi: lit. 'new life' India) is an Indian newspaper published by The Associated Journals Ltd who have been publishing the daily Navjivan since 1 November 1947. Prior to this, a newspaper called Navjivan was published by Indian activist and leader Mahatma Gandhi, and The Associate Journals started publishing Navjivan with his permission.

Similar to publications like the National Herald and Qaumi Awaz, Navajivan was also started with the intention to promote the principles of Mahatma Gandhi's Indian independence movement and Jawaharlal Nehru’s vision of modern India. The main objective of the newspaper was to inform and influence readers who supported the creation of democratic, liberal, and modern India. The aim of the newspaper was to speed up the propagation of the values of Gandhi: the interest in modernization, democracy, justice reform, liberal social harmony of the independence movement.

== History ==
The newspaper, Navajivan, the de facto precursor to Navjivan India was originally founded and published by Mahatma Gandhi and Jawaharlal Nehru. In the early 20th century, the daily Navajivan and the Urdu newspaper Quami Awaz gave voice to the efforts of their influential leaders to create a nation that was determined to meet the world peace, scientific and logical criterion. In 1920, Navajivan also published a detailed operating procedure, outlining management of the Spanish flu pandemic, written by Mahatma Gandhi himself.

== Official re-launch ==
In March 2016, The Associated Journals Ltd. decided to revive the media outlet in digital form. On 1 October 2016, it announced the appointment of Neelabh Mishra as the editor in chief of the National Herald Group.
