= I. V. Chalapati Rao =

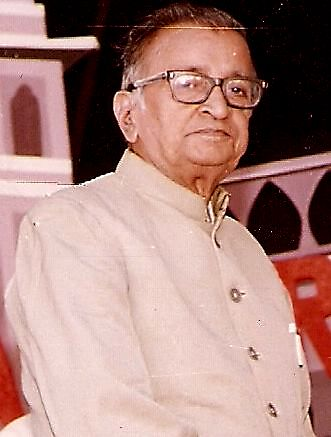
- Born: Iyyanki Venkata Chalapati Rao; 25 April 1923; Kakinada, Andhra Pradesh, India
- Died: 27 April 2016 (aged 93); Hyderabad, India
- Occupations: Educationist, writer, editor
- Awards: Pratibha Rajiv Award – 2009 for Outstanding Contribution to the Field of Education

Iyyanki Venkata Chalapati Rao, better known as I. V. Chalapati Rao, (25 April 1923 – 27 April 2016) was an Indian scholar, public speaker, teacher and editor. He authored over 25 books on education, communication, management and biography. He also reviewed and wrote prefaces and forewords to over one hundred books of well-known writers in English and Telugu.

He was a visiting faculty for many universities, national training institutions and academic staff colleges across the country. He specialized in communication skills, Indian ethos and culture, purpose of life, personality development and related topics.

== Early life ==
Chalapati Rao was born to a well-to-do family in 1923; he lost his father when he was 15. He graduated from Pithapuram Rajah College Kakinada, Andhra Pradesh, India. After graduation, he moved to Nagpur (Maharashtra, India) to pursue his dream of postgraduate study in English Literature.

== Professional life ==
He began his career as a lecturer in 1946 and subsequently went on to become the Head of the Department of English in both private and government colleges. From 1960 to 1971 he was principal of S.R.R. College, Karimnagar and P. R. College, Kakinada (Andhra Pradesh, India), both government degree colleges. In 1971 he became the Deputy Director of Public Instruction, Deputy Director of Higher Education, and later worked as Professor and Director of State Council of Educational Research and Training at Hyderabad.

== Positions held ==
He authored 28 books on education, management, culture and other varied subjects.

He served in various positions for several prestigious institutions. They include: Registrar of Central Institute of English and Foreign Languages (CIEFL), Hyderabad, Co-ordinator, Association of Indian Universities (Regional Centre), Director, Vivekananda School of Management, accredited to Newport University, California (United States), Consultant, Commissionerate of Higher Education, Member Secretary of the committee to advise Government in forming State Council of Higher Education, Member, Andhra Mahila Sabha, Hyderabad Member, Standing Board of Inquiry, Sri Venkateswara University, Tirupati (Andhra Pradesh, India).

He was a visiting professor and resource person for Academic Staff Colleges of Osmania University(India), University of Hyderabad (India), Sri Venkateswara University (India), Andhra University (India) and Jawaharlal Nehru Technological University, Indian Airlines (Management Training Center), Bharat Dynamics Limited (Hyderabad, India), Survey of India, Commissioner of Collegiate and Intermediate Education and Ramakrishna Math, Vivekananda Institute of Human Excellence, Hyderabad (India). He was the chairman of forum for higher education.

He was the Chief Editor of Triveni – a Literary and Cultural Quarterly of India published since 1927 and Editor, "Twilight Life" – Organ of the Association for the care of the Elderly.

== Awards ==
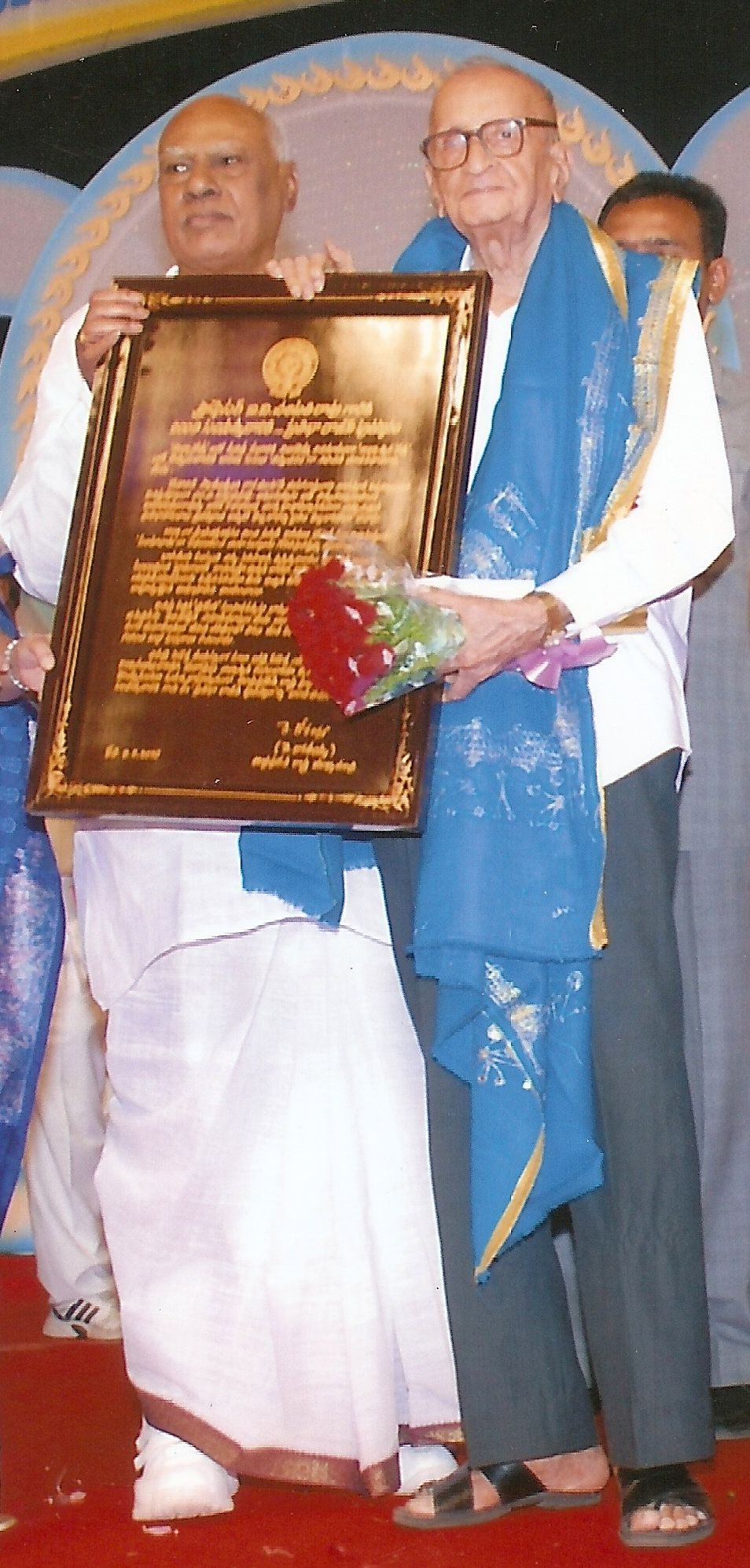
I.V.Chalapati Rao receiving the Pratibha Rajiv Award – 2009 from the then Chief Minister of Andhra Pradesh, K. Rosaiah

- In 2010, I.V.Chalapati Rao was awarded the Pratibha Rajiv Award for his Outstanding Contribution to the Field of Education, by the then Chief Minister of Andhra Pradesh, K. Rosaiah.
- He was felicitated, as noted Educationist and Author by P. V. Narasimha Rao in 1992 (The then Prime Minister of India)
- T. Anjaiah in 1981, N.T.Rama Rao in 1984 and 1987, K. Rosaiah in 2010 (Former Chief Ministers of Andhra Pradesh, India)
- Kumud Ben Joshi in 1989, Krishna Kant in 1990 (Former Governors of Andhra Pradesh, India) and Raghunatha Reddy in 1998 (Former Governor of West Bengal, India) Chairman, University Grants Commission, New Delhi

== List of works ==
Books in English

1. Life of Mahatma Gandhi (1969, Published by Government of Andhra Pradesh)
2. Lives of Great Men (1969, Published by Government of Andhra Pradesh)
3. Lecture Methods and Auxiliary Means of Higher Education (1973, Government Press)
4. Use of Library as Enrichment to Teaching ( Monograph) (1974, Government Press)
5. Examinations in Higher Education (Monograph) (1974, Government Press)
6. Rhythms in Teaching Culture (1978)
7. Nerella Venu Madhav – Mono Acting and Mimicry (1978, Trust Publisher)
8. Our Centres of Learning (1978, Lalitha and co.)
9. Rhythms in the Teaching Culture of Higher Education(1981, Bhasha Kuteeram)
10. Durgabai Deshmukh (1984, Published by Department of Information and Cultural Affairs )
11. The Fifth Estate (1984)
12. R.V.K.M.Surya Rau Bahadur – Maharaja of Pithapuram (1987, Published by Telugu University)-Awarded as "The Best Biography of the Year"
13. Andhra Ratna Duggirala Gopalakrishnaiah (1988, Published by Telugu University)
14. From Farm House to Rashtrapati Bhavan (Biography of President N. Sanjiva Reddy) (1989, Book Links Corp)
15. Sankara (1992, Published by International Centre of Telugu University)
16. College Teachers and Administrators (1992, Book Links Corp)
17. Tanguturi Prakasam, The Journey of My Life – An Autobiography (Tr)(Released by Former Prime Minister P. V. Narasimha Rao) (1992, Book Links Corp)
18. Let's be Worthy of Our Gandhi (1994)
19. Serving the Society Through Industry – Life of K V K Raju (1995, Published by Nagarjuna Group)
20. Great Lives (1996, Published by Andhra Pradesh Open University)
21. Madduri Annapoornayya (1999)
22. My Life is My Message – Sathya Sai Baba (1999)
23. Communication and Leadership (1999, Book Links Corp)
24. Culture Capsules – Art of Living (2002, Yabaluri Raghaviah Memorial Trust)
25. Ancient Wisdom and Modern Insights (2003, Yabaluri Raghaviah Memorial Trust)
26. Indian Renaissance (2004, Yabaluri)
27. Living Through Changing Times (2007, Yabaluri)
28. Vidya Rangamulo Samasyalu (Telugu) (Telugu Vidyardhi)

Translations into English

1. Thyagaraja's Kritis
2. Ramadasu's Kirtanas
3. Kshetrayya Padas
4. Rayaprolu Subba Rao's poem
5. Write up on Annamacharya

== Articles ==
From 1992, I.V.Chalapati Rao has been the editor of the 83 years old "Triveni", a Literary and Cultural Quarterly of India, published by Triveni Foundation. He has published several editorials in "Triveni" including:

1. Culture Inversions and Vanishing values
2. Long Life and Immortality
3. Sweet are the Uses of Adversity
4. Aspiring Writers! Persistence Pays!
5. Information Technology (IT) in the New Millennium
6. Downsizing Bureaucracy
7. Sands of Time/Time Management
8. Kundanlal Saigal
9. Creativity and Intuition
10. Is memory God's gift?
11. Interesting Facts about Famous Writers and Artists
12. Mohammad Rafi – The Magician of the Voice
13. The Vanishing Art of Letter Writing
14. Meditation – Yoga
15. Is not Happiness Within Us?
16. Spicy Bits of Scientist's Lives
17. A Wreath for Teachers
18. Heroism of the Soldiers of the Minority Communities
19. Get back to Gradualness
20. We Should give a Boost to Football
21. Need for Inter-faith Understanding – Jesus Christ
22. A Case for a Return of the Hero
23. Money, Money, Money
24. British /Scholars who Loved and Propagated Indian Wisdom
25. Importance of English in the Present Globalised Scenario
26. Remembering Princess Diana
27. Women on the March
28. Tamasoma Jyotirgamaya
29. Adversity Cannot Stop Excellence
30. Are Religion and Pycho-therapy on the Same Wave Length?
31. Gandhi, "The Only Man in the East With a Sense of Humour"
32. Super Technology-Boon or Bane?
33. Music – its Myriad Faces
34. "My Life is My Message"-Gandhiji
35. Universal Message of the Vedas
36. The Death Defying Philosophy of Socrates
37. Is Not Happiness Within us?
38. English on Tap but Not on Top
39. Art of Ageing Youthfully
40. Pursuit of Happiness
41. Dare to be Different From the Crowd
42. A Galaxy of Great Editors
