= Indian Institute of Planning and Management =

Former business school headquartered in Delhi, India

- Motto: "Dare to think beyond"
- Established: 1973
- Director: Malayendra Kisor Chaudhuri
- Key people: Arindam Chaudhuri (Honorary Dean)
- Location: Delhi, NCT Delhi, India
- Coordinates: 28.615°N 77.366°E
- Interactive map of Indian Institute of Planning and Management
- Website: www.iipm.edu
- Dissolved: 2015

The Indian Institute of Planning and Management (IIPM) was an unaccredited institute headquartered in Delhi, which previously had 18 branches across India. IIPM was shut down after multiple allegations and lawsuits concerning the institute's use of false advertisements and fraudulent practices. After several controversies, the school's Honorary Dean Arindam Chaudhuri decided to shut down all campuses across India, except the one in Delhi. Founded in 1973, the institute used to offer undergraduate, postgraduate and doctoral programmes in national economic planning and entrepreneurship, and international and fellowship programmes. Its executive education programmes include non-credit courses and visits to foreign business schools. IIPM is not accredited by UGC or All India Council for Technical Education (AICTE), and is not affiliated with the public Indian Institutes of Management.

IIPM has been involved in controversies about its advertising. The University Grants Commission (UGC) – a government organisation responsible for the standards of university education in India – and the All India Council for Technical Education (AICTE) have repeatedly issued public notices stating that they do not recognise IIPM, and that they deem its technical programmes invalid. IIPM has responded by stating that it does not issue degrees and that it is not a university. In September 2014 Delhi High Court censured IIPM for misleading students and restrained it from using words like MBA, BBA, management course, and B-school to describe the programs it offered.

In July 2015, IIPM announced that it would stop offering education programmes directly, and shut down all its campuses outside Delhi. As of 2024, IIPM operates only as a research and training institute in Delhi.

== History ==
IIPM was founded in 1973 in Delhi. According to the institute its first residential, full-time, post-graduate diploma programme began in 1974. IIPM had 18 branches across India; in Delhi, Mumbai, Gurgaon, Noida, Bangalore, Chennai, Ahmedabad, Kolkata, Chandigarh, Hyderabad, Pune, Lucknow, Indore, Bhubaneshwar, Bhopal, Jaipur, Dehradun, and Cochin.

IIPM was barred by the UGC from offering among other degrees, MBA or BBA programs after irregularities surfaced on its claims and functioning. IIPM then closed all its branches save for a research and training institute in Delhi. A UGC notice marks IIPM Delhi as unrecognized. The founding director of IIPM is Dr. M. K. Chaudhuri, and the honorary dean is Arindam Chaudhuri.

== Facilities and faculty ==
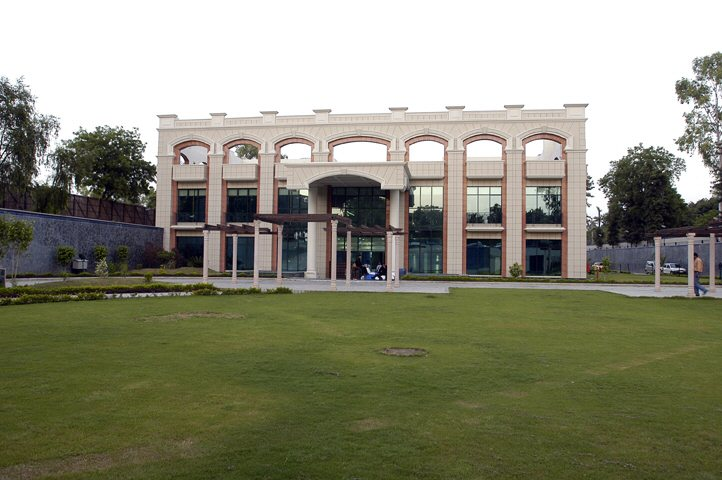
IIPM Campus, Delhi

IIPM has a three-acre campus in Delhi. The facilities at the branches vary but are usually less extensive compared to the main campus. The teaching faculty of the institute mostly comprises its own alumni and visiting professors. About 20% of the faculty have doctoral degrees. According to the Financial Times, IIPM has recruited many international professors to teach in India. The institute has built up its teaching faculty by recruiting its own alumni. Under the Global Outreach Programme, IIPM invites faculty members from business schools to its campuses to teach its students.

== Academics ==
=== Offered programmes ===
IIPM is an academic partner of Manonmaniam Sundaranar University, which issues degrees to IIPM students. According to the institute, it offers international programmes and programmes under its School of Business and Economy. These include undergraduate programs in planning and entrepreneurship lasting three years and postgraduate programs in the same subject lasting two years. A one-year postgraduate course is available for working executives with at least two years of past work experience. The institute also offers PhD and Fellowship programmes for postgraduates. The institute does not award BBA or MBA degrees; it awards certificates for its students who can then apply for degrees from allied institutions. Since 2010, IIPM students can get MBA and BBA degrees from Manonmaniam Sundaranar University.

=== Courses ===
Under its programmes in planning and entrepreneurship, the institute offers certificate courses aimed at making students eligible for degree courses. The IIPM course lasts 22 months and includes 1,944 hours of teaching. The postgraduate programme has 1,920 contact hours. The institute tries to give its students a "hands on" approach to learning, assigning them to work on consulting projects in major firms. In the first year, core subjects include marketing, accounting, finance, economics and organizational behaviour. In the second year, marketing and IT courses are compulsory and students choose a major in human resource or finance. The institute also offers courses that take unconventional approaches to business management. There is a focus on developing executive communication.

All students of the institute attend a 21-day compulsory trip to Europe as part of its Global Opportunities and Threat Analysis (GOTA) programme. The programme arranges visits to multinational firms and political organisations. Since 2008, students have visited Africa and Australia under the GOTA programme.

=== Relationships with educational institutions ===
In 2006, IIPM collaborated with Stanford University's Center for Professional Development to organise a strategy workshop in Delhi. In 2008, professors from the National University of Singapore (NUS) conducted a seven-week course on investment banking at the institute for its top 100 students, leading to a joint certification in investment banking. In the same year, IIPM launched a global executive management programme with Chicago GSB and the Haas School of Business associated with it. As of 2009, NUS was conducting workshops on business-related topics in Singapore for IIPM students. Between 2009 and 2012, Singapore's Nanyang Technological University sent students to the institute for a four-week course about Indian culture and economy.

As of January 2012, IIPM claimed that its global partners were: NYU Stern (for International Residency), Imperial College (participating B-school), Haas School of Business (Strategic Marketing Programme), McCombs School of Business (Affiliate B-school), Cornell University ILR School (Participating school for GOTA), National University of Singapore (Wealth management programme) and Nanyang Technological University. IIPM lists Judge School of Business (Cambridge University), Darden School of Business (University of Virginia) and SDA Bocconi School of Management as past partner institutions. The Mercator School of Management of Duisburg-Essen University has a formal partnership with IIPM for exchanging students and faculty, and jointly conducting research.

== Relationship with accreditation organisations ==
The certifications offered directly by IIPM are not accredited by AICTE – a regulating body for technical education in India whose accreditation is a voluntary process. According to IIPM, its courses do not come under the purview of AIU, AICTE, UGC and similar government-established regulatory bodies. The Supreme Court of India agreed in 2019 that AICTE has no jurisdiction over MBA education.

=== History ===
In 2005, the acting chairman of UGC, Prof V N Rajshekharan Pillai, said that IIPM's advertisements could be misleading. In June 2008, the Delhi High Court advised the UGC and IIPM to settle the matter amicably through an out-of-court settlement. According to the institute, it had not sought de jure recognition from any statutory body or accrediting authority. UGC and AICTE listed IIPM as a "fake university" and said it was not permitted to confer MBA and BBA degrees or authorised to operate as a university in India. IIPM filed a lawsuit in response. In June 2008, UGC and IIPM reached an agreement in the Delhi High Court. UGC agreed to remove IIPM's name from its list of fake universities and IIPM agreed to clarify that it offers only "certificate courses".

The institute says it is an academically independent and autonomous body without affiliation to any university and its programs do not fall under the purview of AIU, AICTE, UGC, or similar government-established regulatory bodies. The Uttarakhand University Registrar in February 2010 said that IIPM was running MBA and BBA degree programs without UGC and AICTE affiliations and that IIPM's continuing operation would be detrimental to institutions that operate with affiliations.

In July 2010, UGC issued a notice to IIPM after the Andhra Pradesh State Council of Higher Education questioned IIPM on the authenticity of its courses at its Hyderabad campus. UGC Chairman Ved Prakash said that IIPM was advertising its programs using the names of UGC, HRD Ministry and AICTE, and that "it is indulging in cheating." IIPM Group President for Corporate Affairs Amit Saxena said the institute was not a university, was not empowered to award degrees on its own and was doing neither, and that IIPM was "on-site academic partner of Manonmaniam Sundaranar University which grants its degrees to IIPM students." Saxena also said that IIPM had made representations to UGC and Andhra Pradesh State Council of Higher Education to clarify its position and that the subject was sub judice at the Delhi High Court. The registrar of Manonmaniam Sundaranar University confirmed that IIPM was authorized to offer Manonmaniam Sundaranar University's MBA/BBA programs in all of IIPM's 18 branches. Students of IIPM's Indian School of Business and Economics (ISBE) were informed by Manonmaniam Sundaranar University that theirs is a distance-learning degree arrangement.

In July 2019, the Supreme Court of India decided that AICTE has no jurisdiction over MBA education and that IIPM can conduct MBA education without AICTE's permission.

== Controversies ==
IIPM has been involved in controversies related to its claims about infrastructure, job placements and affiliation with international institutes. Journalists and independent bloggers have investigated IIPM's claims in its newspaper advertising. IIPM denies these charges and has filed legal cases against some journalists. In February 2013, a district court in Gwalior passed an order asking India's Department of Telecommunications to block access to 78 URLs critical of IIPM, which led to online protests. The Hindu's editor wrote that an IIPM advertisement which stated that The Hindu had called the institute "the B-School with a Human Face" was "illegal and unethical", and said that the quotation was the headline of a paid advertisement and The Hindu has not endorsed IIPM in any way. In December 2013, the Delhi High Court barred IIPM from publishing any TV, print or online advertisements without first obtaining the court's approval, given that past IIPM advertisements had potentially misled the public.

=== Conflicts with journalists ===
In 2005, Outlook – whose 2003 rankings IIPM had used in its advertisements – issued a statement withdrawing all rankings awarded to the institute, saying IIPM misguides students through unethical advertising practices and does not fully and truthfully disclose facts. According to Arindam Chaudhuri, this was done after he said that Outlook used the perception of qualitative rankings to influence business school rankings. IIPM responded with legal action against Outlook.

In June 2005, an Indian online magazine called Just Another Magazine (JAM) published an article accusing IIPM of misleading students and the public with its advertisements by using institutional rankings published in 2003 which were no longer valid. The article said that the IIPM is not accredited by UGC or AICTE. After a court ruling, the article was removed from the internet. JAM's editor Rashmi Bansal later published similar content in her blog. In response, IIPM called JAM's statements an attempt to spread baseless rumours and filed a lawsuit against Bansal. In a court ruling in June 2010, Bansal was ordered to take down her blog article. Gaurav Sabnis, an IBM employee at that time, was forced to resign from his post after IIPM threatened to burn IBM laptops in front of IBM's Delhi office.

Later, the magazine Careers 360 – published by Maheshwar Peri – investigated the case. IIPM again went to court against Peri and his publications Outlook and Careers 360 on defamation charges. In 2010, Uttarakhand High Court quashed the case. Another magazine, The Caravan, published an article critical of IIPM in 2011 and is facing a legal challenge. In 2016, IIPM withdrew all remaining cases against Peri.

In 2009, Mahesh Sarma wrote in Careers 360 that for the class of 2008, three companies mentioned in IIPM advertisements as participants in campus placement said that although some freshers of the institute may have been working for them, the companies had never participated in the institute's campus recruitment process. Sarma profiled a sample of jobs that IIPM said its students obtained abroad in the Persian Gulf countries. As of June 2010, according to The Pioneer, Standard Chartered and Barclays were offering jobs to IIPM students.

In 2009, according to Sarma's article, Judge Business School (University of Cambridge), Darden Graduate School of Business Administration (University of Virginia) and Haas School of Business hosted IIPM's non-credit Executive Education program participants and conducted sessions for them. Sarma wrote that McCombs School of Business was not aware of a relationship with IIPM, and that IIPM may have a relationship with another University of Texas-Austin college. Judge Business School told Sarma that they were delivering a "five-day non-degree executive education program" to IIPM students at the University of Cambridge, and that "there are no university qualifications awarded from Cambridge University or Judge Business School. The only certificate is a certificate of attendance which is what we provide to participants on all our programs." Darden Business School told Sarma that "along with Cambridge (Judge) and UC Berkeley (Haas)", University of Virginia's Darden School of Business was providing a series of week-long Executive Education non-credit programs for IIPM. Darden also said it had no partnership agreement with IIPM. Haas Business School confirmed the existence of a contract with IIPM and said that IIPM "may represent itself as a business school participating with the Haas School of Business", and that Haas faculty will teach courses in the IIPM program.

Sarma also reported that the University of Buckingham had told him that although they were in talks with IIPM, there was no formal agreement yet and that until IIPM's programs are formally accredited by the QAA, IIPM does not have consent to mention the University of Buckingham in its advertisements. According to Sarma, after Careers360 published its article, IIPM removed the name of University of Buckingham from its advertisements.

Sarma said NVAO – the accreditation organization for Netherlands and Flanders – said that IMI "is not a recognized higher education institution in the Dutch or French speaking part of Belgium" and cannot award recognized degrees. According to Careers 360, the Uttarakhand government appointed the registrar of Uttarakhand Technical University to conduct an inquiry; the registrar recommended banning IIPM.

=== Wikipedia conflicts ===
The IIPM reportedly used paid editors to doctor its article and those of its critics on the English Wikipedia, for promotional purposes. A Wikipedia user identified by the username "Wifione" was highly involved in such activity, monitoring the IIPM article to remove content that was critical of the institute. After gaining the trust of users, Wifione was also promoted to the position of administrator, and used this new influence to continue these activities. It was also found that Wifione had used at least 60 "sockpuppet" accounts on the website to influence discussions in favor of modifications to the page that reflected the opinion of the IIPM. The effects of these strategies were magnified by the introduction of the Wikipedia Zero program, which offers free access to Wikipedia content on mobile phones in developing countries—including India. This program thus allowed users to discover the institute's biased article. In February 2015, Wifione was banned from Wikipedia by the Arbitration Committee (ArbCom) for these actions.

== Litigation ==
=== 2009 ===
IIPM filed a criminal defamation charge against Careers 360. However, all proceedings in the criminal complaint filed by IIPM against Careers360 was quashed by the Uttarakhand High Court by its judgement dated 8 October 2010. The Court noted that "the sole purpose of the article was to caution gullible students. This court does not find anything defamatory in the article", and that IIPM could show "no proof of their claim that they grant degree from Buckingham University!"

=== 2013 ===
In December 2013, Livemint.com reported that public-interest litigation filed in 2010 by Mahesh Sarma, the editor of Careers 360, led to the Delhi High Court barring IIPM from publishing any TV, print or online advertisements without first obtaining the court's approval, given that past IIPM advertisements had potentially misled the public. According to Livemint.com, the interim court order was based on an affidavit by the University Grants Commission (UGC), which stated that IIPM advertisements had the potential to "mislead innocent students and public at large"; a UGC committee investigating the issue had found that the "practice of issuing such dubious advertisements by IIPM to attract students deceptively should be stopped forthwith". Portions of the UGC document were quoted in the interim court order.

=== 2014 ===
In September 2014, the Delhi High Court censured IIPM and its founder Arindam Chaudhuri for misleading students. A division bench restrained IIPM and its management with immediate effect from using the words "MBA, BBA, management course, management school, business school or b-school" in relation to the courses offered by it as well as in representations made to the public. The court noted that IIPM was promoting an impression that it had recognition from a foreign management institute, International Management Institute (IMI), Belgium. The court found that IMI had in fact been set up by Arindam Chaudhuri and his father Malay Chaudhuri, and was not even recognized by the laws of Belgium. The institute was also "directed to prominently display on the website of IIPM that they are not recognized by any statutory body/authority" and clarify the status of the foreign institutions from which students enrolling in IIPM would be getting a degree or certification

=== 2016 ===
In January 2016, IIPM withdrew all cases against Peri, chairman and chief executive of Careers360 when Peri sought to get all cases transferred to Supreme Court. In another setback to IIPM, University Grants Commission issued a notice on their website informing general public that IIPM is not a university and is not entitled to confer various educational degrees.

=== 2019 ===
In September 2019, Kolkata High Court was hearing of a petition of two students who claimed to have been impressed by the IIPM ads featuring actor Shahrukh Khan giving them an impression of IIPM as a trustworthy institution. Following this the court has asked the actor for an explanation on his relationship and business dealings with IIPM. In response the actor's lawyer denied claims in the petition and mentioned the actor had simply appeared in some ads for the institute. Meanwhile, the High court also questioned state government on why should the case have a CBI probe.

=== Trade practices ===
In May 2007, The Monopolies and Restrictive Trade Practices Commission (MRTPC) – an anti-monopoly watchdog – initiated a probe into IIPM's advertisements. They suspected that IIPM recovers the cost of GOTA tours and laptops, both advertised as free, from students later on. In October 2007, MRTPC announced that it would not be processing inquiries against business schools because of staff shortages.

=== Tax issues ===
In May 2007, S.S. Palanimanickam, Minister of State for Finance, answered a question in the Rajya Sabha raised by Dharam Pal Sabharwal, another Rajya Sabha member. Palanimanickam said, "IIPM has not paid income tax during the assessment years 2005–06 and 2006–07, claiming exemption under section 10(23C) (vi) of the Income-tax Act, 1961." The ministry also said that IIPM had paid no service tax in the preceding two years. Under a query raised through the Right to Information Act on the institute, the Central Board of Direct Taxes said that the ministry received a "tax evasion complaint in respect of wrong claims of exemption under Section 10(23C) of the Income Tax Act, 1961." In April 2009, the Indian government stated that there were "no pending tax claims against IIPM" and the case had been closed after due enquiry.

== Notable alumni ==
- Abhishek Banerjee (politician)

== See also ==
- Capitation fee
