= National Herald =

Indian newspaper published by The Associated Journals Limited

- Freedom is in Peril, Defend it with All Your Might
- Type: Daily newspaper
- Owner(s): Associated Journals Limited, Shiva Publications
- Founder: Jawaharlal Nehru
- Publisher: The Associated Journals Limited
- Editor-in-chief: Rajesh Jha
- Founded: 9 September 1938; 88 years ago
- Relaunched: 1 June 2017
- Political alignment: Indian National Congress
- Language: English
- Headquarters: New Delhi
- City: New Delhi and Lucknow
- Country: India
- Sister newspapers: Qaumi Awaz (Urdu) and Navjivan (Hindi)
- Website: nationalheraldindia.com

The National Herald is an Indian English-language newspaper published by The Associated Journals Ltd, and owned by Young India Limited, a company by Rahul Gandhi and Sonia Gandhi, and Shiva Publications, a partnership firm by Vishnu Goyal and Rekha Goyal.

It was founded by India's first prime minister Jawaharlal Nehru in 1938 as a tool to win independence. It was banned by British government in 1942 during the Quit India Movement. It was one of the major English language newspapers in India after the end of the British Raj, and occasionally published op-eds authored by Nehru. The newspaper ceased operations in 2008 for financial reasons. In 2016, it was relaunched as a digital publication. The newspaper has been linked to and controlled by members of the Indian National Congress political party.

The newspaper is an accused in the National Herald corruption case along with Sonia Gandhi and her son Rahul Gandhi.

== History ==
National Herald was established in Lucknow on 9 September 1938 by Jawaharlal Nehru. The paper carried on its masthead the words 'Freedom is in Peril, Defend it with All Your Might' taken from a cartoon by Gabriel from Brentford, Middlesex that Indira Gandhi had forwarded to Nehru. Jawaharlal Nehru was an early editor of the newspaper and until his appointment as prime minister was the chairman of the Herald's board of directors. In 1938, Kotamraju Rama Rao was appointed the paper's first editor. Following the Quit India Resolution of August 1942, the British Raj clamped down on the Indian press and the paper was shut between 1942 and 1945. The Herald reopened in 1945 and from 1946 to 1950, Feroze Gandhi served as the paper's Managing Director, helping restore its financial health. From 1946 to 1978, Manikonda Chalapathi Rau served as its editor.

Nehru had served as the paper's international correspondent for a while and after becoming prime minister was able to use the paper to espouse unpopular views and to sidestep the press corps in conveying his thoughts on various issues to the reading public as in 1954 when he wrote a scathing piece on the Bikini Atoll nuclear tests titled 'The Death-dealer'. The paper had editions from Lucknow and New Delhi, the latter begun in 1968. In Delhi, the paper was based out of Herald House on Bahadur Shah Zafar Marg, known as Delhi's Fleet Street while in Lucknow it was based out of the Nehru Bhawan and Nehru Manzil buildings. The National Herald also had Hindi and Urdu editions named Navjeevan and Qaumi Awaz.

In January 2008 discussions about closure began. On 1 April 2008 the paper's editorial (of its sole remaining edition, New Delhi) announced that it was temporarily suspending operations. The paper had failed to modernise its print technology and had not computerised at the time of suspending operations and had been making losses for several years owing to lack of advertising revenues and overstaffing. At the time of its closure T V Venkitachalam was its editor-in-chief.

== Indore Edition ==
Mumbai based businessman Vishnu Goyal said his involvement with the National Herald dates back to 1998, when Shiva Publications (a partnership firm) bought rights to publishing the National Herald in Indore & Mumbai. Goyal launched the Indore edition in 2009, months after The Associated Journals decided to shut the Herald’s publication subsequent to settling dues of the staff. Designated as Chief Editor of National Herald & Global Herald Newspapers, Goyal is also the Chairman & Managing Director of Alpha Vision Overseas India Ltd, a company listed on the BSE.

== Plans for revival ==
National Herald, before its closure was being run by Associated Journals. There were reports that the paper was being revived under journalist Suman Dubey, technocrat Sam Pitroda and the newly incorporated Young India Company headquartered at Herald House. However, Rahul Gandhi, a member on the board of Young Indian Company denied of such movement and mentioned that it is a not-for-profit company and cannot have any profitable business.

In March 2016, The Associated Journals Ltd. decided to revive the media outlet in digital form. On 1 October 2016, it announced the appointment of Neelabh Mishra as the Editor in Chief of the National Herald Group. On 14 November 2016, an English website was launched. Simultaneously, it also announced that the print publications under suspension, namely National Herald in English, Navjivan in Hindi and Quami Awaz in Urdu, would be revived in due course. In its press release dated 14 November 2016 the National Herald group pledged its commitment to furthering the editorial vision and principles of its founder Pt. Jawaharlal Nehru and India’s Freedom Movement – that of building a modern, democratic, just, equitable, liberal and socially harmonious nation.

== Official re-launch ==
On 12 June 2017, Rahul Gandhi re-launched National Herald at an event in Bengaluru. Vice President of India Hamid Ansari was the chief guest and said, "The duty of the state is clear - free media is necessary for free society. When faced with unjust restrictions, censorship in the media can aid covering of abuses."

== Commemorative edition ==
The commemorative edition of National Herald was launched on 1 July 2017, by the then President of India Pranab Mukherjee.

== Controversies ==
The National Herald corruption case is an ongoing case in a Delhi court filed by Indian economist and politician Subramanian Swamy against politicians Sonia Gandhi and Rahul Gandhi, their companies and associated persons. As per the complaint filed in the court of the Metropolitan Magistrate, Associated Journals Limited (AJL) took an interest-free loan of ₹90.25 crore (US$9.4 million) from Indian National Congress. It is alleged that the loan was not repaid. A closely held company, Young Indian, was incorporated in November 2010 with a capital of ₹50 lakh (US$52,000) and it acquired almost all the shareholding of AJL and all its properties (alleged to be worth ₹5,000 crore (US$520 million)).

A defamation suit of Rs 5000 crore was filed by Reliance Group, against National Herald claiming an article published by it regarding the Rafale fighter jet deal was "libellous and derogatory".
