= Assisted suicide in the United States =

Medically induced suicide with help from another person

State laws regarding Medical Aid in Dying in the United States Assisted dying is legal Pending legislation to legalize assisted dying

In the United States, the term "assisted suicide" is typically used to describe what proponents refer to as "medical aid in dying" (MAID), in which a terminally ill adult is prescribed, and self-administers, barbiturates if they feel that they are suffering significantly. The term is often used interchangeably with "physician-assisted suicide" (PAS), "physician-assisted dying", "physician-assisted death", and "assisted death".

Assisted suicide is similar to, but distinct from, euthanasia (sometimes called "mercy killing"). In cases of euthanasia, another party acts to bring about the person's death, in order to end ongoing suffering. In cases of assisted suicide, a second person provides the means through which the individual is able to voluntarily end their own life, but they do not directly cause the individual's death.

As of 2026, physician-assisted suicide, or "medical aid in dying", is legal in fourteen US jurisdictions: Illinois, California, Colorado, Delaware, the District of Columbia, Hawaii, Montana, Maine, New Jersey, New York, New Mexico, Oregon, Vermont, and Washington. These laws (excluding Montana, where there is no explicit legislation) state that "actions taken in accordance with [the Act] shall not, for any purpose, constitute suicide, assisted suicide, mercy killing, or homicide, under the law". This distinguishes the legal act of "medical aid in dying" from the act of helping someone die by suicide, which is prohibited by statute in 42 states, and prohibited by common law in an additional six states and the District of Columbia. A 2018 poll by Gallup displayed that a majority of Americans, with 72 percent in favor, support laws allowing patients to seek the assistance of a physician in ending their life. Nevertheless, assisted suicide remains illegal in a majority of states across the nation.

In 2022, the state of Oregon ruled it unconstitutional to refuse assisted suicide to people from other states who are willing to travel to Oregon to die that way, effectively giving out-of-state residents the opportunity to die by physician-assisted suicide. Before someone travels to Oregon to die by physician assisted suicide, those helping the patient travel to Oregon might be prosecuted for assisting a suicide. After the barbiturates are acquired, if the patient returns to their home state, those assisting with mixing the fatal dose of barbiturates may be prosecuted for assisting a suicide. Vermont removed its residency requirement for people to take advantage of its medically assisted suicide law in 2023, to settle a lawsuit.

The punishment for participating in physician-assisted death varies throughout the other states. The state of Wyoming does not "recognize common law crimes, and does not have a statute specifically prohibiting physician-assisted suicide". In Florida, "every person deliberately assisting another in the commission of self-murder shall be guilty of manslaughter, a felony of the second degree".

== History ==
=== Early movements ===
The first significant drive to legalize assisted suicide in the United States arose in the early twentieth century. In a 2004 article in the Bulletin of the History of Medicine, Brown University historian Jacob M. Appel documented extensive political debate over legislation to legalize physician-assisted death in Iowa and Ohio in 1906.

In Ohio, the legislation was inspired by the campaign of heiress Anna Sophina Hall, whose mother had died a long, drawn-out, painful death from liver cancer. Despite Hall's efforts, the bill was rejected by the Ohio legislature by a vote of 79 to 23.

=== Washington v. Glucksberg ===
Dr. Harold Glucksberg, in 1994, along with four other physicians, three terminally ill patients, and Compassion and Dying, brought a case against the state of Washington for banning assisted suicide. The case was filed in District Court in 1994.

Following a series of appeals, the U.S. Supreme Court decided in 1997 in a unanimous decision to uphold Washington's ban. They cited the Due Process Clause and argued that assisted suicide is not guaranteed as a fundamental liberty protected by due process. The case allowed individual states to decide independently on the medical aid-in-dying issue. It set the stage for legislative efforts on the state level to either permit or ban physician-assisted suicide.

=== Jack Kevorkian ===
Assisted suicide in the United States was brought to public attention in the 1990s with the highly publicized case of Dr. Jack Kevorkian. Kevorkian assisted over 40 people in dying by suicide in Michigan. His first public assisted suicide was in 1990, of Janet Adkins, a 54-year-old woman diagnosed with early-onset Alzheimer's disease in 1989. He was charged with murder, but charges were dropped on December 13, 1990, because there were no Michigan laws outlawing suicide or the medical assistance of it so he was not in violation of a law.

In 1998, Kevorkian videotaped himself giving a man a lethal injection, with the patient's consent, and aired the tape on 60 Minutes. This was significantly different from previous cases, where it was always the patients themselves who reportedly completed the suicide process. He was found guilty of second-degree murder and served eight years of a 10–25 year sentence. He was released in 2007, and died on June 3, 2011.

=== Legalization by states ===
Physician-assisted dying was first legalized by the 1994 Oregon Death with Dignity Act, with effect delayed by lawsuits until 1997. The Montana Supreme Court ruled in Baxter v. Montana (2009) that it found no state law or public policy reason that would prohibit physician-assisted dying.

It was legalized by Washington in 2008, Vermont in 2013, California and Washington, D.C., and Colorado in 2016, Hawaii in 2018, New Jersey in 2019, Maine in 2020, New Mexico in 2021, and Illinois in 2025 It had also been briefly legal in New Mexico in 2014 and 2015 due to a court decision that was overturned.

=== Brittany Maynard ===
In 2014, the death of Brittany Maynard, an advocate for the legalization of aid in dying, from brain cancer led to renewed debate in the United States over assisted suicide, and was cited as being responsible for bills in several states on the topic. Her home state of California, which she left to reside in Oregon to access its Death With Dignity Act, became the fifth state to authorize aid in dying, in 2015.

== Jurisdictions where assisted suicide is authorized ==
=== California ===
In 1992, the group Californians Against Human Suffering proposed Proposition 161 to allow patients with less than six months to live the right to receive assistance from physicians in dying. This proposition offered more safeguards against abuse by physicians than Washington's Initiative 119, such as special protections for patients in nursing facilities. This measure failed to pass with 46 percent of the vote.

Between 1990 and 1995, physicians became increasingly more receptive to the concept of assisted suicide. Subsequent efforts were tried to pass assisted death legalization through the California State Legislature in 1999, 2005, and 2006, all of which failed. The California legislature passed the California End of Life Option Act, a bill legalizing the practice in September 2015, and the bill was signed into law by Governor Jerry Brown on October 5, 2015, making California the fifth state to authorize medical aid in dying and the second to do so through the legislature. The Act began implementation on June 9, 2016. The law went into effect in June 2016. The bill allows medication to be prescribed by a licensed physician to a patient who is over the age of 18, living with a chronic and life altering condition that is irreversible, and must be of sound mind to make these decisions. The law is commonly referred to as the EOLA.

In May 2018, Judge Daniel A. Ottolia of the Superior Court of Riverside County ruled that the method of enacting the law was unconstitutional, but the law was reinstated by a state appeals court the following month.

The 2016 law as passed was only valid for a period of 10 years and was set to need renewal by 2026. On 5 October 2021, California Governor Gavin Newsom signed on to extend the use of the bill until 1 January 2031. The revised bill also shorted the waiting period of approval from 15 days to 48 hours and required health care providers to publish information regarding end of life care on their website.

As of 2025, the most recent data for California was for 2023 and published in July 2024. In 2023, 1,281 individuals received prescriptions under the EOLA. Of those, 884 (69%) died following their ingestion of the prescribed aid- in-dying drug(s), which included 39 individuals who received their prescription before 2023. Of the 884 individuals, 92.8% were 60 years of age or older, 97.1% had health insurance, and 93.8%were receiving hospice and/or palliative care. Since the law came into effect June 9, 2016, through December 31, 2023, 6,516 individuals have been written prescriptions under the EOLA and 4,287 individuals, or 66%, have died from ingesting the medications. In 2023, 92.7% of individuals who died following ingestion of an Aid-in-Dying drug were over 60 years of age.

=== Colorado ===
Representatives Lois Court and Joann Ginal introduced assisted suicide legislation in 2015 in the Colorado House. The bill was voted down in committee 8–5. In April 2016, Julie Selsberg and Jaren Ducker filed an initiative with the secretary of state seeking to authorize medical aid in dying in November 2016 through the ballot process.On November 8, 2016, Colorado voters passed Proposition 106, the Colorado End of Life Options Act, making assisted death legal among patients with a terminal illness. With 65% voting in favor, Colorado became the third state to legalize medical aid-in-dying by a vote of the people, raising the total to six states.

As of 2025, the most recent data for Colorado was as of 2021. From 2017 (inception) to 2021, the total number of patients prescribed aid-in-dying medication was 777, and the total number of patients to whom aid-in-dying medication was dispensed was 583 (75%). 50.9% of decedents prescribed aid-in-dying medication were Male. 74% of decedents prescribed aid-in-dying medication were aged 65+. 94.6% of decedents prescribed aid-in-dying medication were white. 84.9% of decedents prescribed aid-in-dying medication were under hospice care.

=== District of Columbia ===
In January 2015, D.C. Council member Mary M. Cheh introduced the Death with Dignity Act of 2015. On October 5, 2016, the D.C. Committee on Health and Human Services voted 3–2 for the Death with Dignity Act. On November 1, 2016, the D.C. Council voted 11–2 to advance the Death with Dignity Act. It then went through another vote in the council and the Mayor's office. Mayor Bowser signed the bill on December 23, 2016. After the-30 day U.S. Congress review mandated by the federal Home Rule Act, and following the inability of Congressional Republicans to block the bill, the law went into effect on February 18, 2017, with D.C. becoming the seventh jurisdiction in the U.S. to legalize this.

=== Hawaii ===
Since 2019, Hawaii has legally allowed assisted dying, based on the Oregon and Washington state models. Governor David Ige signed a medical aid-in-dying law on April 5, 2018. The law has safeguards to protect against abuse, including two health care providers being required to confirm a patient's diagnosis, prognosis, his or her ability to make decisions, and that the patient's request is voluntary; as well as a counselor being required to determine that the patient does not have conditions that may interfere with decision-making, such as untreated depression. The law requires that the patient must make two oral requests for the life-ending medication, with a 20-day waiting period in between, and sign a written request witnessed by two people, one of whom cannot be a relative. Criminal penalties apply to anyone attempting to coerce people into obtaining life-ending medication or tampering with said patient's request.

In 2023, there were 91 qualified patients for whom a prescription was written, 76 (84%) of which had died as of July 1, 2024. 73 (80%) of the qualified patients died while enrolled in hospice or other similar palliative care program during 2023. 51 (67%) of qualitied patients that died self-administered the aid-in-dying prescription.

=== Illinois ===
The End-of-Life Options Act (SB 1950), also called Deb's Law, seeks to authorize a qualified patient with a terminal disease to request that a physician prescribe aid-in-dying medication that will allow the patient to end the patient's life in a peaceful manner. It was introduced in the 2025 legislative session by House Majority Leader Robyn Gabel and Assistant Senate Majority Leader Linda Holmes. On May 29, 2025, it was passed by the House in a 63 to 42 vote, sending to the Senate who passed it on October 31, 2025, in a 30 to 27 vote; when polled 71% of Illinois voters supported passing this legislation. On December 12, 2025, Governor JB Pritzker signed SB 1950 into law. The law took effect in September 2026, making Illinois the thirteenth jurisdiction in the U.S. to legalize assisted suicide.

=== Maine ===
The Maine Death with Dignity Act was introduced in the state legislature in 2019 by Representative Patricia Hymanson (D-York). The bill passed in the House by 73 to 72 and in the Senate by 19 to 16. On June 12, 2019, Governor Janet Mills signed the Maine Death with Dignity Act into law making Maine the ninth jurisdiction to legalize assisted suicide in the United States.

In 2023, 80 patients began the process, with 4 of them dying before the request was fulfilled. All 76 remaining patients were deemed eligible for death with dignity. At the time of the 2023 reports' issuance, there were only 9 of the 76 alive, meaning 67 or 88% of all eligible patients were issued a death certificate. Ages ranged from 31 to 98 years old. 47% of patients had a college degree. 53 of the 67, or 79%, died via patient choice. 42 of the cases were related to terminal cancer.

=== Montana ===
Aid in dying is legal in Montana through a state supreme court decision. In Baxter v. Montana (2009) the Montana Supreme Court ruled in a 5–2 decision that state law allows for terminally ill Montanans to request lethal medication from a physician under existing statutes, in 2009. The Attorney General of the state of Montana sought an appeal from the Montana Supreme Court, but the court, by a decision of five to two, affirmed the lower court's ruling on the state law. The Court did, however, limit the scope of the decision by not determining if the state's constitution protected the right.

The extent of the practice of AID in Montana post-Baxter is not known because there is no statute governing the practice. There is no mandated annual collection and reporting of data. Anecdotal evidence reflects that some Montana physicians provide AID. Clinicians consider the practice to be "in the closet", despite the Baxter decision.

=== New Jersey ===
A New Jersey Assembly committee voted in favor of assisted suicide legislation, and the full state Assembly voted on Assemblyman John Burzichelli's bill, known as A 2270, the New Jersey Death with Dignity Act, on November 13, 2014, although the bill failed to receive a vote in the Senate. The bill would have required patients with a terminal disease to first verbally request a prescription from their attending physician, followed by a second verbal request at least 15 days later and one request in writing signed by two witnesses. In addition, the attending physician would have to offer the patient a chance to rescind their request. Governor Chris Christie, at the time the bill was going through a legislative review and voting, vowed to veto any bills related to allowing assisted suicide.

State Senator Nicolas Scutar introduced the Aid in Dying for the Terminally Ill Act in January 2018. The bill was passed on the State Assembly on March 25, 2019, and it was signed by Governor Phil Murphy on April 12, 2019, making New Jersey the 7th state to legalize assisted suicide. The law went into effect on August 1, 2019.

As of December 2024, 287 terminally ill people have used prescription drugs to die since the inception of the bill. In 2023 alone, 101 terminally ill individuals used prescription drugs to die, with 80% being over the age of 65, 57% being female, and 53% having graduated from a four-year college or holding another advanced degree.

On December 10, 2025, the Medical Aid in Dying for the Terminally Ill Act was ruled by the Philadelphia-based 3rd Circuit Court of Appeals to only be applicable for residents of New Jersey. This comes after a Delaware women with Stage 4 Lymphoma challenged the New Jersey resident requirement for doctor assisted suicide. The woman had died before the ruling after oral arguments. U.S. Circuit Court Judge Stephanos Bibas stated, “Many terminally ill patients face a grim reality: imminent, painful death. Some may want to avert that suffering by enlisting a doctor’s help to end their own lives. New Jersey lets its residents make that choice—but only its residents.”

=== New Mexico ===
In January 2014, it seemed as though New Mexico had inched closer to being the fifth state in the United States to legalize physician-assisted suicide via a court ruling. "This court cannot envision a right more fundamental, more private or more integral to the liberty, safety and happiness of a New Mexican than the right of a competent, terminally ill patient to choose aid in dying," wrote Judge Nan G. Nash of the Second District Court in Albuquerque. This decision was overturned on 11 August 2015 by the New Mexico Court of Appeals, in a 2–1 ruling. The Court gave the verdict: "We conclude that aid in dying is not a fundamental liberty interest under the New Mexico Constitution".

On April 8, 2021, Governor Michelle Lujan Grisham signed the Elizabeth Whitefield End-of-Life Options Act into law after the bill passed the New Mexico Legislature, legalizing assisted suicide in the state. The law allows for terminally ill patients with six months or less to live to request lethal medication. Two medical experts are required to agree on the patient's diagnosis and the patient must pass a mental competency screening in order to receive lethal medication. There is a 48-hour waiting period, after which the patient must take the medication themselves. The law took effect on June 18, 2021.

=== New York ===
In 1994, a suit was filed in New York claiming that the anti-assisted suicide statute was a violation of equal protection and liberty guarantees of the Fourteenth Amendment. This claim was rejected by the District Court on the basis that there is no right to assisted suicide given by the U.S. Constitution. In 1996, the U.S. Court of Appeals overturned this ruling with the reasoning that the criminalization of assisted suicide violates the Equal Protection Clause. However, the U.S. Supreme Court unanimously reversed the U.S. Court of Appeals decision in Vacco v. Quill, 521 U.S. 793 (1997).

In February 2015, New York state senators Brad Hoylman and Diane Savino introduced a "Death With Dignity Act" to allow physician-assisted suicide in the state.

On September 7, 2017, in Myers v. Schneiderman, the New York Court of Appeals held that terminally-ill persons did not possess a right to physician-assisted suicide under the New York State Constitution.

In 2025 a bill, New York State Senate Bill S138, that would legalize assisted suicide under certain conditions in the state was passed in the State Senate and House. It was originally unclear if State governor Kathy Hochul would sign it into state law. Hochul later came out in support of it and said she would sign it into law in early 2026, officially signing it into law on February 6, 2026.

=== Oregon ===
Oregon passed the nation's first physician-assisted suicide law when voters approved the Death with Dignity Act (DWDA) by general election in November 1994. The measure was adopted by a narrow margin of 51.3% to 48.7%. Ballot Measure 16, a citizen initiative sponsored by Oregon Right to Die Political Action Committee, asked if terminally ill patients with less than six months to live should be able to receive a prescription for lethal drugs and included many provisions to protect against misuse, such as two oral requests and a written request from the patient. The patient must also be referred to counseling if a mental illness is suspected.

The law went into effect in October 1997 after an injunction delayed implementation. In November 1997, Measure 51 was placed on the general election ballot to repeal the Act. Voters chose to retain the Act by a margin of 60% to 40%.

Oregon requires a physician to prescribe drugs and they must be self-administered. In order to be eligible, the patient must be diagnosed by an attending physician as well as by a consulting physician, with a terminal illness that will cause the death of the individual within six months. The law states that, in order to participate, a patient must be: 1) 18 years of age or older, 2) a resident of Oregon, 3) capable of making and communicating health care decisions for him/herself, and 4) diagnosed with a terminal illness that will lead to death within six months. It is up to the attending physician to determine whether these criteria have been met. It is required the patient orally request the medication at least twice and contribute at least one (1) written request. The physician must notify the patient of alternatives; such as palliative care, hospice and pain management. Lastly the physician is to request but not require the patient to notify their next of kin that they are requesting a prescription for a lethal dose of medication. Assuming all guidelines are met and the patient is deemed competent and completely sure they wish to end their life, the physician will prescribe the drugs.

As of the 2024 report, a total of 4,881 people had DWDA prescriptions written and 3,243 patients had died from ingesting drugs prescribed under the DWDA, representing a rate of 66%. In 2024, 53.2% of all those who died from DWDA prescriptions were male.

==== Challenges ====
===== Lee v. State of Oregon =====
In December 1994, doctors and patients argued that the DWDA violated the U.S. Constitution's first and fourteenth amendments in Lee v. Oregon. U.S. District Court Judge Michael Hogan placed a temporary injunction, that he later made permanent, on the Act.

In February 1997, the Ninth Circuit Court of Appeals ruled to dismiss the challenge to the Death with Dignity Act.

===== Measure 51, Oregon repeal of Death with Dignity =====
In 1997, Measure 51 was placed on the November ballot. It failed, and 60% of Oregon voters, more than the original 1994 vote, expressed their support for the Death with Dignity Act.

===== Oregon v. Ashcroft =====
U.S. Attorney General John Ashcroft issued a directive in 2001 to prevent the Oregon Death With Dignity Act from being implemented. The state of Oregon successfully sued and proceeded with implementation.

=== Vermont ===
In May 2013, the Vermont Legislature passed the Patient Choice and Control at End of Life Act. Governor Peter Shumlin signed it into law. The law is based on, but is less restrictive than, the Oregon model.

Vermont was the first state to pass an assisted death law through the legislative process. In January 2013 the act was introduced to the Senate, and in May 2013 it was passed by both the house and senate.

Vermont residents 18 years old or older who are mentally capable adults with a terminal illness and a prognosis of six months or less to live can make an oral request and obtain a lethal dose of medication from a physician to hasten their death. The bill requires a second opinion, written and oral requests, and other provisions.

In August 2022, a Connecticut resident with end-stage cancer sued Vermont to invalidate the law's residency requirement for medical aid-in-dying, arguing that it was unconstitutional. Vermont settled the case by removing the non-resident requirement, becoming the first state to allow doctors to prescribe lethal medication to non-residents.

From inception to June 2023, only 203 Vermonters sought and qualified for the medication. 153 (75%) of the 203 Vermonters received the medication due to cancer.

=== Washington ===
In Washington, physician-assisted suicide did not become legal until 2008.

In 1991, a ballot question asked if terminally ill adults should be allowed to receive physician aid-in-dying. The initiative failed, receiving 46 percent of the vote.

In 1997, four Washington physicians and three terminally ill patients brought forth a lawsuit that would challenge the ban on medical aid in dying that was in place at the time. This lawsuit was first part of a district court hearing, where it ruled in favor of Glucksberg, which was the group of physicians and terminally ill patients. The lawsuit was then affirmed by the Ninth Circuit. Thus, it was taken to the Supreme Court, and there the Supreme Court decided to grant Washington certiorari. Eventually, the Supreme Court decided, with a unanimous vote, that medical aid in dying was not a protected right under the constitution as of the time of this case.

Washington voters approved the Death with Dignity Act by general election in November 2008 by a margin of 58% to 42%. The ballot summary read: "This measure would permit terminally ill, competent, adult Washington residents medically predicted to die within six months to request and self-administer lethal medication prescribed by a physician. The measure requires two oral and one written request, two physicians to diagnose the patient and determine the patient is competent, a waiting period, and physician verification of an informed patient decision. Physicians, patients, and others acting in good faith compliance would have criminal and civil immunity."

Washington's rules and restrictions are similar, if not exactly the same, as Oregon's. Not only does the patient have to meet the above criteria, they also have to be examined by not one, but two doctors licensed in their state of residence. Both doctors must come to the same conclusion about the patient's prognosis. If one doctor does not see the patient fit for the prescription, then the patient must undergo psychological inspection to tell whether or not the patient is in fact capable and mentally fit to make the decision of assisted death or not.

In 2022, 446 individuals qualified for assisted suicide via medication under the act, with 363 (81%) individuals dying after ingesting the medication and 44 (10%) dying without taking the dosage. 234 (52%) were male.

== Other jurisdictions ==
=== Alaska ===
In 1999, two terminally ill patients, Kevin Sampson and Jane Doe, sued for an order to exempt their physicians from being charged with manslaughter for assisting them in dying. The superior court ruled against them, and they appealed to the Alaska Supreme Court. This court upheld the previous ruling with the reasoning that the Alaska Constitution's right to privacy and liberty does not allow terminally ill patients to be assisted by physicians in dying.

More recently, Representative Harriet Drummond (D-Anchorage) has twice introduced legislation to legalize physician assisted suicide: first in 2015 and again in 2017. In each case, the act was heard in the House Health & Social Services Committee, then was rolled over to the session for the subsequent year. In 2018, the House Health & Social Services Committee passed the bill 3 to 2, with 2 abstentions, sending it to the Judiciary Committee, where it stalled again.

=== Arizona ===
Arizona's state legislature has heard bills to legalize physician assisted suicide and patient-controlled pain medication dosing numerous times since 2003. Each year from 2017 to 2020, companion bills for assisted suicide were simultaneously introduced in the House and Senate, but failed to advance.

In 2017, the legislature passed a related law, SB1439, Prohibition on Discrimination Against Health Care Entities, which prohibits discrimination against medical care providers who opt out of providing assistance in dying, should such care ever be legalized. It was subsequently signed by the Governor on March 24, 2017.

In Arizona, the city of Bisbee became the first municipality in the state to approve an aid in dying resolution, although the vote is not legally binding.

The resolution states that the city of Bisbee:

- Respects the diversity of perspectives of its citizens,
- Supports equal protection within the diversity of perspectives on end-of-life decisions,
- Recognizes the practice of Aid in Dying as a legitimate individual liberty,
- And, while not a legally enforceable document, urges prosecutorial discretion by the Cochise County Attorney in de-prioritizing cases involving prosecution of a person who has supported, been present, or facilitated a loved one to advance the time of his or her imminent death when facing intolerable suffering.

=== Connecticut ===
Legislation to legalize assisted suicide was first introduced in Connecticut in 1995, when Oregon considered its own policy. Similar bills have had a public hearing in seven of the last eight years (2013–2020, excepting 2016), but they consistently died in committee without coming to a vote. HB06425, An Act Concerning Aid In Dying For Terminally Ill Patients, was evaluated by the Connecticut Public Health Committee March 5, 2021 with a 24–9 vote to send to the assembly floor, however was then referred to the Judiciary Committee and subsequently tabled.

=== Florida ===
Krischer v. McIver was a case brought to the Florida Supreme Court in 1997 by the Florida chapter of the Hemlock Society in an attempt to overturn the state's anti-assisted suicide law. The question was if AIDS patient Charles Hall had this right, and the case was appealed to the Florida Supreme Court. This court upheld the constitutionality of Florida's law against assisted suicide.

In 2020, State Senator Kevin Rader (D-29) introduced the first ever Florida bill to legalize physician assisted suicide, SB1800, the Florida Death with Dignity Act. The bill was indefinitely postponed and withdrawn from consideration on March 14, 2020.

=== Maryland ===
The Maryland legislature has considered and rejected bills on physician-assisted death many times, beginning in 1995. From 2015 to 2017, an End of Life Option Act was introduced each year, but each year withdrawn without a vote. In 2019, the reintroduced act was brought to a vote. It passed the House 74–66, but failed in the Senate with a tie 23–23. In 2020, the act was once again introduced but subsequently set aside due to the COVID-19 pandemic. Governor Larry Hogan, whose term in office ended in 2023, has suggested in the past that he would oppose the legislation, but indicated in 2020 that his personal battle with cancer had changed his perspective and that he was now "open to both sides of the issue".

=== Massachusetts ===
Voting results for the 2012 Massachusetts Death with Dignity Initiative

The Massachusetts Death with Dignity Initiative, a ballot measure to legalize aid in dying, was narrowly defeated in the 2012 general election, with 51% of voters against the proposal.

A poll taken by the Boston Globe and the University of New Hampshire between September 21 and 27, 2012, found Massachusetts residents supporting Question 2 68%, with 20% opposed. Another public poll by the University of Massachusetts and YouGov American found similar results as late as October 8 with 65% in support and 19% opposed.

Legislation to legalize physician assisted suicide was introduced numerous times in the Massachusetts House both before and after the ballot initiative, in 1995, 1997, 2009, 2011, 2012, 2013, and 2015. None of these bills moved out of committee.

In 2017, companion bills in the House and Senate were introduced on the issue, with 44 and 11 cosponsors on the respective bills, but died in committee after a joint public hearing. In 2019, a similar pair of bills was introduced by an expanded coalition of 67 cosponsors in the House and Senate. An amended version of these bills, the Massachusetts End of Life Options Act, advanced from the Joint Committee on Public Health on May 29, 2020, to the Joint Committee on Healthcare Financing, where it failed to receive a vote before the end of the 2020 legislative session on December 31.

A 2019 poll of 500 residents conducted by The Boston Globe and Suffolk University, released in 2020, found that 70% of Massachusetts residents agreed that "the terminally ill [should] be permitted to end their own lives with the help of a doctor, also known as medical aid in dying." Support for assisted suicide was similar across broad geographic regions, age brackets, and genders, but varied more by race, with stronger support among White (73%) and Black (64%) respondents, and less support from Hispanic/Latino (50%) and Asian (52%) respondents. The overall margin of error was reported as ±4.4, but higher for smaller subgroups.

In January 2025, Massachusetts Senator Joe Comerford, Representative James J. O’Day, & Representative Edward Philips introduced the End of Life Options Act (H2505/S1486) as a Joint Resolution to the Massachusetts General Court. The Act seeks to authorize a "terminally ill, mentally capable adult with a prognosis of six months or less to live the option to request, obtain and ingest medication — should they choose — to die peacefully in their sleep if their suffering becomes unbearable", and is closely modeled after Oregon's highly successful Death With Dignity Act. In July 2025, the legislation passed favorably out of the Joint Committee on Public Health and is set to be reviewed by other committees, including the Committee on Health Care Financing and Ways & Means, a significant milestone as the bill had previously stalled in these committees.

=== Nevada ===
In May 2017, a bill was passed by the state senate, which sought to legalize physician-assisted suicide. However, when passed to the Nevada Assembly, the Committee on Health and Human Services chose not to advance the bill. Similar legislation was reintroduced at the next legislative session, which took place in 2019. Although it once again passed out of committee, it was not brought to a full Senate vote before the deadline. On March 8, 2023, SB239 was introduced to the Nevada Legislature, which was very similar to the previous failed bills. The bill successfully advanced through committees in both bodies, on April 19 it passed in the Senate by a narrow margin of 11–10, and on May 24 it passed in the House by a margin of 23–19. However the bill did not become law, on June 5 it was vetoed by Governor Joe Lombardo, despite widespread support from the public, and failed to receive the necessary 2/3rd's supermajority vote in the House & Senate to override the governor's veto as required by the Nevada Constitution.

=== Tennessee ===
Tennessee's legislature first debated legalizing assisted suicide in 2015. In the following year, a prominent Tennessee political figure, John Jay Hooker, took the cause to the courts by filing a lawsuit asking for physician assisted suicide. The case was in the appeals process when Hooker died of cancer on January 24, 2016.

A pair of companion bills to legalize the practice were introduced in the Tennessee House and Senate in 2017, but did not advance.

=== Mississippi ===
SB2283, the Mississippi Death With Dignity Act, which sought to legalize physician-assisted suicide, was introduced in the Mississippi Senate in 2017 by Mississippi state senator Robert Jackson. The bill was referred to committee, but did not advance to a hearing.

=== Indiana ===
Indiana House Bill 1011, called the End of Life Options Act, was introduced to the Indiana House of Representatives in January 2025 by Representative Matt Pierce to legalize physician-assisted suicide, the bill is modeled after Oregon's highly successful Death With Dignity Act. The bill died in committee and did not make it to a vote, although Rep. Pierce intends to keep advocating for it. The bill will continue to face stiff opposition, as in 2024 Senator Tyler Johnson introduced Senate Concurrent Resolution 17, which the Indiana Senate passed 39–9, the resolution opposes and condemns physician-assisted death as “a direct threat to human dignity, patient rights, and the disabled”; although it died in the House where it faced considerable criticism.

=== New Hampshire ===
In January 2025, Rep. Bob J. Lynn introduced the New Hampshire End of Life Freedom Act (HB254) to the New Hampshire legislature, which seeks to establish a legal framework for individuals with terminal illnesses to access medical aid-in-dying medication. On March 20 the bill was put on hold to possibly be considered later legislative session, following a 183–182 vote to table the motion, the session ended on June 26 without the bill being picked up again, effectively killing it.

=== Pennsylvania ===
In April 2025, the Pennsylvania legislature introduced the Compassionate Aid in Dying Act (HB1109/SB570), which seeks to amend the Pennsylvania Consolidated Statutes, providing for compassionate aid in dying. HB1109 was referred to the House Judiciary Committee, and SB570 to the Senate Judiciary Committee, as of September 2025 the committees are still gathering data from public hearings and other studies.

=== West Virginia ===
On November 5, 2024, West Virginians voted by a majority of 50.5% to enact a ban on assisted suicide in the state's constitution.

== State power to allow and regulate ==
States have the power to regulate, allow or prohibit assisted suicide.

In 1997, in the cases of Washington v. Glucksberg and Vacco v. Quill, the U.S. Supreme Court ruled unanimously that there is no Constitutional right to assisted suicide, and that states therefore have the right to prohibit it. Advocates of assisted suicide saw this as opening the door for debate on the issue at the state level.

Gonzales v. Oregon was brought to the United States Supreme Court in 2006. The court ruled that the United States Attorney General could not enforce the federal Controlled Substances Act against physicians who prescribed drugs, in compliance with Oregon state law, for the assisted suicide of the terminally ill.

== In practice ==
Health departments in Oregon, Washington D.C, and Washington State publicly report yearly on the use of assisted death; as required in their respective statutes.

A documentary was produced in 2011 called How to Die in Oregon which follows a woman who uses assisted death and interviews her family and interviews opponents of the law.

== Controversy ==
People disagree about what the practice of helping a terminally ill or disabled person die should be called. Proponents call the practice "medical aid in dying" because they do not believe that killing oneself under those circumstances is wrong or unhealthy. Opponents tend to prefer the term "physician-assisted suicide (PAS)", which employs the technical terms for self suicide. They feel that PAS is the most accurate moniker for the act of helping anyone end their own life. Like all heated debates, terms for the latter practice are subject to political framing. Proponents are more likely to use terms like "physician-assisted dying", "physician-assisted death", "aid in dying", "death with dignity", "right to die", "compassionate death", "compassionate dying", "end-of-life choice", and "medical assistance at the end of life". Opponents do not view the latter practice as a legitimate medical procedure, hence they regard the aforementioned labels as euphemisms and use the term "assisted suicide".

Controversy concerning the legalization of this practice typically arises from concerns regarding its intersection with manipulative circumstances or family members; inaccurate prognoses, the accuracy of death certificates, unequal access to healthcare, financial problems, the Werther Effect, advocacy for the practice's expansion to those with disabilities, the deaths of disabled persons in places like Canada that have occurred because of a lack of social support, evidence of abuse in other jurisdictions where PAS is authorized and ableism in general. Opponents view these factors as legitimate reasons to keep physician assisted suicide illegal.

=== Debate over whether assisted suicide/MAiD is suicide ===
Suicide refers to the act of taking one's own life. Opponents feel that this term is appropriate to describe assisted death, because of the social and personal dynamics that can pressure someone into choosing death. Opponents also cite the fact that oncologists and other non-psychiatric physicians responsible for referring patients for counseling are not trained to detect complex, potentially invisible disorders like clinical depression.

Proponents feel that "medical aid in dying" differs from suicide because a patient must be confirmed by two physicians to be terminally ill with a prognosis of 6 months or less to live and must also be confirmed by two physicians to be mentally capable to make medical decisions. That is why proponents support death certificates that list their underlying condition as the cause of death. According to the proponents, suicide is a solitary, unregulated act whereas aid in dying is medically authorized and is intended to allow for the presence of loved ones. Proponents define "suicide" as an irrational act committed in the throes of mental illness. They assert that the latter act is fundamentally distinct from the practice that they are advocating, as it is intended to be a measured act.

In contrast, opponents feel that this characterization of suicide is erroneous. They point out that people commit suicide for political reasons, for the same reasons that proponents cite as rational justifications for assisted death, and that mentally ill people who become terminally ill may experience assisted death as a potential "out" in regard to suicidal ideation that they had previously fought. Moreover, they argue that the highly publicized deaths of assisted death advocates are political acts.

== Assisted suicide versus euthanasia ==
In the United States, assisted suicide is a practice by which a terminally ill person who is believed to be of sound mind and has a prognosis of six months or less requests, obtains and – if they feel their suffering has become unbearable – self-administers barbiturates to end their life.

Euthanasia, which is practiced in some states of Australia, Canada, Belgium, Colombia, Luxembourg, the Netherlands, New Zealand, Portugal and Spain, is a practice in which another person (generally a physician) acts to cause death. Euthanasia is illegal in the United States, whereas assisted suicide is currently authorized in thirteen states and the District of Columbia.

== Public opinion ==
=== Gallup ===
In a May 2020 Gallup poll, 74% of U.S. adults say doctors should be allowed to end the life of a patient with an incurable disease "by some painless means" if the patient and the patient's family requests it."

In a May 2016 Gallup poll, 69% of Americans said they agree that "when a person has a disease that cannot be cured...doctors should be allowed by law to end the patient's life by some painless means if the patient and their family request it." The fact that the caveat in this poll is incurable illness rather than terminal illness represents one of the opponents' primary objections to assisted death.

In a May 2015 Gallup survey, 68% of Americans agreed that "individuals who are terminally ill ... have the right to choose to end their own life."

A 2014 Gallup survey found that 69% of Americans think that doctors should be allowed by law to end the life of a patient who has a disease that cannot be cured "by some painless means if the patient and their family request it."

=== Other surveys ===
In 2014, a Harris Poll found that 74% of Americans agree that "individuals who are terminally ill ... have the right to choose to end their own life."

17,000 U.S. doctors representing 28 medical specialities were surveyed by Medscape on end-of-life issues. The survey found that 54% of doctors believe assisted suicide, or medical aid in dying, should be available as an end-of-life option.

A survey by the Pew Research Center found that in 2025 63% of US adults do not consider physician assisted suicide to be morally wrong (34% found it morally acceptable, 29% did not see it as a moral issue). Medical aid in dying was considered by 35% of adults to be morally wrong. Three quarters of Democrats (and people who lean democratic) and a slight majority of Republicans (and people who lean Republican) had no moral qualms with the practice. Conservative Republicans (or lean Republican) was the only partisan group that had a majority expressing that ending a patient's life with the help of a doctor is morally wrong. A majority of white evangelical Protestants (60%) and black Protestants (52%) saw it as morally wrong, the only religious groups to do so. Only a minority of Catholics thought similarly, despite opposition to medically assisted suicide by the institutional Catholic Church. The religiously unaffiliated, especially agnostics and atheists, are the groups most likely to view medical aid in dying as morally acceptable.

== Advocates ==
=== Religious leaders ===
- George Carey
- Desmond Tutu

=== Actors ===
- Olympia Dukakis
- Elliott Gould
- Florence Henderson
- Leonard Nimoy
- Patrick Stewart
- Montel Williams

=== Public personalities ===
- Jane E. Brody
- Dolores Huerta
- Derek Humphry
- Jack Kevorkian
- Brittany Maynard
- Philip Nitschke
- Jeanne Phillips
- Diane Rehm
- Betty Rollin
- George Will

== Opponents ==
=== Public personalities ===
- Charles Krauthammer

=== Politicians ===
- Victoria Reggie Kennedy
- Ralph Nader
- Denise Provost

=== Lawyers ===
- Harriet McBryde Johnson
- Shain Neumeier
- Wesley J. Smith

=== Doctors ===
- Ira Byock

=== Activists ===
- Ly Xīnzhèn M. Zhǎngsūn Brown
- Dominick Evans
- Marilyn Golden
- Ari Ne'eman
- Corbett O'Toole
- Alice Wong

=== Actors ===
- Liz Carr
- Martin Sheen

=== Academics ===
- Adrienne Asch
- Rosemarie Garland-Thomson
- Paul K. Longmore

== Supportive organizations ==
- American College of Legal Medicine
- American Medical Student Association
- American Medical Women's Association
- American Nurses Association of California
- American Public Health Association
- Coalition for Liberty & Justice
- Compassion and Choices
- Death with Dignity National Center
- End of Life Washington
- GLMA: Health Professionals Advancing LGBT Equality
- National Association of Social Workers
- Older Women's League
- Oregon Hospice and Palliative Hospice Association
- Triage Cancer

== Neutral organizations ==
- American Academy of Hospice and Palliative Medicine
- American Pharmacists Association
- American Psychological Association
- American Society of Health-System Pharmacists
- Coalition for Compassionate Care of California
- California Hospice and Palliative Care Association
- California Medical Association
- Colorado Medical Society
- Hospice and Palliative Care Council of Vermont
- Kokua Mau (Hawaii)
- Missouri Hospice and Palliative Care Association
- Oncology Nursing Association
- Vermont Psychiatric Association
- Washington State Medical Association
- Washington State Psychological Association

== Opposing organizations ==
- ADAPT
- American Association of People with Disabilities
- American College of Physicians
- American Medical Association
- American Nursing Association
- Arc of the United States
- Autistic Women & Nonbinary Network
- Catholic Church
- Disability Rights Education and Defense Fund
- Euthanasia Prevention Coalition
- International Task Force on Euthanasia and Assisted Suicide (Patients Rights Council)
- Islamic Medical Association of North America
- LULAC
- National Council on Disability
- National Council on Independent Living
- National Spinal Cord Injury Association
- Patients Rights Action Fund
- TASH
- World Association of Persons with Disabilities
- World Medical Association

== See also ==
- Baxter v. Montana
- Euthanasia in the United States
- Oregon Death with Dignity Act
- Suicide in the United States
- Washington Death with Dignity Act
