= Kathryn Tucker =

American attorney (born 1959)

- Born: 1959 (age 66–67)
- Education: Hampshire College (BA); Georgetown University (JD)
- Occupation: Attorney

Kathryn Tucker (born 1959) is an American attorney and the executive director of the End of Life Liberty Project, which she founded during her tenure as executive director of the Disability Rights Legal Center. She graduated from Georgetown University Law Center in 1985 and Hampshire College in 1981. Tucker has been an adjunct law professor at Lewis and Clark School of Law, Seattle University the University of Washington, Loyola/LA and Hastings. Beginning in 1990, while an attorney at the Seattle firm of Perkins Coie, she did pro bono work for Washington Citizens for Death with Dignity, which led her into the movement to legalize medical aid in dying (MAID).

As legal director of Compassion & Choices in 1997 Tucker argued Washington v. Glucksberg before the U.S. Supreme Court, seeking to establish a federal constitutional right to choose medical aid in dying, but the Supreme Court concluded that MAID is not a protected liberty interest under the US Constitution. Whether to legalize PAS was left up to each individual state. Tucker successfully defended the Oregon Death with Dignity Act in Oregon v. Gonzales. In that case, the Supreme Court ruled that the Controlled Substances Act does not allow the Attorney General to prohibit doctors from proscribing regulated drugs for use in MAID under state law that permitted it.

Tucker was a lead author of a California law requiring pain management education for physicians, which passed in 2001. Tucker defends physicians who face prosecution for adequate pain management. She has published numerous articles on end-of-life issues in law, medicine and health policy journals.

== Publications ==
- "Psychedelic Medicine: Galvanizing Changes in Law and Policy to Allow Access for Patients Suffering Anxiety Associated with Terminal Illness", __ Quinnipiac Health L. J. ___(2018, in press)
- "A Nadir of State Constitutional Jurisprudence: Failing to Protect Terminally Ill Patients' Choice for a More Peaceful Death in New Mexico" __UNM L. Rev. __(2018, in press)
- "New Vision of Health Demands New Vision of Dying", Health21 Magazine, August 17, 2017. http://health21magazine.com/article/new-vision-of-health-demands-new-vision-of-dying/
- "Building Bridges Between the Civil Rights Movements of People with Disabilities and Those with Terminal Illness", 78 Pitt. L. Rev. 329–350(2107)
- "End of Life Liberty in California", JURIST, Feb. 21, 2017, http://jurist.org/professional/2016/12/kathryn-tucker-end-of-life-liberty-in-california.php.
- "End of Life Liberty in DC", JURIST, Dec. 15, 2016, http://jurist.org/professional/2016/12/kathryn-tucker-end-of-life-liberty.php
- "Litigating for the Right to Die", 2015 New Zealand Law Journal 172(2015)
- "Vermont's Patient Choice at the End of Life Act: A Historic "Next Generation" Law Governing Aid in Dying", 38 VT L. Rev. 687–699 (2014)
- "Give Me Liberty at My Death: Expanding End-Of-Life Choice in Massachusetts," 58 N.Y. L.Sch. L. Rev., pp 349–366(2014)
- "Aid in Dying: an End-of-Life Option Governed by Best Practices," Journal of Health & Biomedical Law, vol. 8, pp 9–26 (2012)
- "Aid in Dying: Guidance for an Emerging End-of-Life Practice," CHEST Journal, vol. 142, no. 1, pp 218–224 (2012)
- "When Dying Takes Too Long: Activism for Social Change to Protect and Expand Choice at the End of Life," 33 Whittier Law Review pp 109–160 ( 2011)
- "Elder Law: Counseling Clients Who Are Terminally Ill," 37 William Mitchell L. Rev (no.1) pp 118–131 (2010)
- "Aid in Dying: A Matter of Elder Justice and Civil Rights," End-of-Life Choices: Who Decides? Older Women's League Mother's Day Report, pp 33–39 (2010)
- "End-of-life Care in Idaho: Law, Medicine, Policy and Geography" the crit: a critical studies journal, vol. 3, issue 2, pp 1–19 (2010)
- "The Need for More Accurate Terminology in Discussing End-of-Life Options," Archives of Internal Medicine, vol. 170, no.3, p 307 (Feb. 8, 2010)
- "Final Acts: Death, Dying, and the Choices We Make, Chapter Author:Empowering Patients at the End of Life: Law, Advocacy, Policy" Rutgers University Press (2009)
- "The Campaign to Deny Terminally Ill Patients Information and Choices at the End of Life" 30 Journal of Legal Medicine 495 (2009)
- "Empowering Terminally Ill Cancer Patients with the Option of Aid in Dying" Oncology Issues pp. 8–11(November–December (2009)
- "State of Washington, Third State to Permit Aid in Dying" Journal of Palliative Medicine Vol. 12, No 7, pp 583–584(2009)
- "At the Very End of Life: The Emergence of Policy Supporting Aid in Dying Among Mainstream Medical and Health Policy Associations" Harvard Health Policy Review Vol. 10, No. 1, pp. 45–47 (2009)
- "Ensuring Informed End-of-Life Decisions" Journal of Palliative Medicine Vol. 12, No 2., pp 119–120 (2009)
- "The Washington State Death with Dignity Act" National Academy of Elder Law Attorneys Journal Volume 21, Issue 1, pp 12–17 (2009)
- "The "Medical Right": Impact on End-of-Life Care" SSRN, available at: http://ssrn.com/abstract=1168043 (2008)
- "In the Laboratory of the States: The Progress of Glucksberg's Invitation to States to Address End of Life Choice," Michigan Law Review (2008)
- "Patient Choice at the End of Life: Getting the Language Right," 28 Journal of Legal Medicine 305–325 (2007)
- "Privacy and Dignity at the End of Life: Protecting the Right of Montanans to Choose Aid in Dying," 68 Montana Law Review 317–333 (2007)
- "U.S. Supreme Court Ruling Preserves Oregon's Landmark Death with Dignity Law," NAELA Journal, Volume II, No. II, pp 291–301 (2006)
- "Federalism in the Context of Assisted Dying: Time for the Laboratory to Extend beyond Oregon, to the Neighboring State of California". Willamette Law Review. 41: 863. 2005.
- "Medico-Legal Case Report and Commentary: Inadequate Pain Management in the Context of Terminal Cancer – The Case of Lester Tomlinson," 5 Pain Medicine 214–217 (June 2004)
- "End of Life Care, a Human Rights Issue," 30 Human Rights 11 (2003)
- "A Piece of the Puzzle: Bringing Accountability to Failure to Treat Pain Adequately," 6 Journal of Palliative Medicine 615–617 (2003)
- "A New Risk Emerges: Provider Accountability for Inadequate Treatment of Pain," 9 Annals of Long-Term Care 52–56 (2001)
- "Improving Pain Care: A Safe Harbor is Not Enough," 11 Health Law 15 (1999)
- "Treatment of Pain in Dying Patients," 338 New England Journal of Medicine 1231 (1998); 339 New England Journal of Medicine 705 (1998)
- "The Death with Dignity Movement: Protecting Rights and Expanding Options after Glucksberg and Quill," 82 Minnesota Law Review 923 (1998)
