= Act 39 =

Vermont law legalizing assisted suicide

Act 39 of 2013 established the U.S. state of Vermont's Patient Choice and Control at End of Life Act (Vermont Statutes Annotated Sec. 1. 18 V.S.A. chapter 113), which legalizes medical aid in dying (commonly referred to as physician-assisted suicide) with certain restrictions. Vermont was the first state to enact this Law through legislative action; it permits some terminally ill patients to determine the time of their own death.

The measure was passed by both House and Senate and signed into law by Vermont Governor Peter Shumlin on May 8, 2013.

== The law ==
Under the law, a competent adult Vermont resident who has been diagnosed, by a physician, with a terminal illness that will kill the patient within six months, may request in writing, from his or her physician, a prescription for a lethal dose of medication for the purpose of ending the patient's life. Exercise of the option under this law is voluntary and the patient must initiate the request. A patient who obtains a prescription for the intended purpose of hastening death may change his or her mind at any time. Any physician, pharmacist or healthcare provider who has moral objections may refuse to participate.

The request must be confirmed by two witnesses, at least one of whom is not related to the patient, is not entitled to any portion of the patient's estate, is not the patient's physician, and is not employed by a healthcare facility caring for the patient. The prescribing physician must refer the patient to a second physician for medical confirmation of the diagnosis, prognosis, and a determination that the patient is capable, is acting voluntarily, and is making an informed decision. After the request is made, another physician must examine the patient's medical records and confirm the diagnosis. The patient must be determined to be free of a mental condition impairing judgment. If the request is authorized, the patient must wait at least fifteen days and make a second oral request before the prescription may be written. The patient has a right to rescind the request at any time. Should either physician have concerns about the patient's ability to make an informed decision, or feel the patient's request may be motivated by depression or coercion, the patient must be referred for a psychological evaluation.

The law protects doctors from liability for providing a lethal prescription for a terminally ill, competent adult in compliance with the statute's restrictions. Participation by physicians, pharmacists and health care providers is voluntary.

== The process ==
A physician may prescribe medication to a terminally ill adult patient that will be self-administered for the purpose of hastening the patient's death. In order to comply with Vermont law, the physician must:

- Determine that the patient is suffering from a terminal condition, with a life expectancy of 6 months or fewer, based on the physician's physical examination of the patient and review of the patient's relevant medical records.
- Determine that the patient is capable of making a health care decision.
- Determine that the patient is making an informed decision.
- Determine that the patient is a Vermont resident.
- Determine that the patient is making a voluntary request for medication to hasten his or her death.
- Determine that the patient is able to self-administer the medication requested to hasten death.
- Inform the patient in person, both verbally and in writing of:
1. the medical diagnosis consisting of the prognosis, including an acknowledgment that this is a prediction of life expectancy and an estimate based on the physician's best medical judgment; that this is not a guarantee of the actual time remaining in the patient's life and that the patient could live longer than the time predicted;
2. provide the range of treatment options appropriate for the patient's diagnosis;
3. if the patient is not enrolled in hospice care, all feasible end-of-life services, including palliative care, comfort care, hospice care and pain control;
4. the range of possible results, including potential risks associated with taking the prescribed medication;
5. The probable result of taking the prescribed medication.
- Refer the patient to a second physician for medical confirmation of the diagnosis, prognosis, and a determination that the patient is capable, is acting voluntarily, and is making an informed decision.
- Either verify that the patient did not have impaired judgment, or refer the patient for an evaluation by a psychiatrist, psychologist, or clinical social worker licensed in Vermont for confirmation that the patient is capable and does not have impaired judgment.
- Consult with the patient's primary care physician, with the patient's consent, if applicable.
- Inform the patient of the right to rescind his or her request at the time that the second oral request is made (which can be no fewer than 15 days after the first oral request).
- Ensure that all the required steps were carried out in accordance with the law and confirm, immediately prior to writing the prescription, that the patient was making an informed decision.
- Write the prescription no fewer than 48 hours after the patient's written request for medication to hasten death, the patient's second oral request (which can be no fewer than 15 days after the first oral request); or the physician offering the patient an opportunity to rescind the request.
- Dispense the medication directly (if the physician is licensed to dispense medication in Vermont); or contact a pharmacist (with the patient's consent) and inform the pharmacist of the prescription, and deliver the written prescription personally, by mail or by fax to the pharmacist.
- After writing the prescription, promptly file a report with the Department of Health documenting completion of all of the requirements under this statute.

== History ==
Dick and Ginny Walters, founders of Patient Choices Vermont (PCV) began working to pass Vermont's Act 39 in 2002, based on the Oregon Death with Dignity Act. They were both 77 years old and had no idea that it would take eleven years to pass the bill and another two years to solidify it. They began by studying the Vermont legislative process, and based on numerous meetings in their living room a small group formed a 501(c)(4) corporation. Their daughter, Betsy Walkerman, an attorney who is now President of PCV, drafted the first Vermont bill following the pattern of the Oregon Death with Dignity Act. Their daughter Nancy Hawley set up PCV's first website.

To find sponsors in the legislature, Dick contacted representatives and senators who were likely to be in favor of right-to-die legislation. Early on, thirty-nine representatives and a number of senators agreed to co-sponsor the proposed DWD bill.

PCV enlisted the assistance of national organizations to make use of their experience. Both Death with Dignity National Center and Compassion and Choices helped with advice, telephoning, funding, and connections to Oregon people who flew in to testify in legislative committee hearings. Among them were a rabbi, the head of the state hospice organization, and a researcher from Oregon Health & Science University who worked extensively on the statistics in Oregon.

From the beginning, PCV's Board of Directors included professors and medical doctors. All were committed to the mission and worked persistently through many years, enabling the group to become close-knit. Early in the process, Dick and Ginny were introduced to the lobbying firm of Sirotkin and Necrason (now the Necrason Group), with whom PCV developed a close and lasting relationship. Their steadfast dedication, invaluable expertise and guidance in strategic planning was critical to the organization's success.

In 2004, at the request of the legislature, the Vermont Legislative Counsel studied Oregon's Death with Dignity law and published a report detailing its efficacy and positive outcomes. Through 2009, legislation was proposed in the Vermont House and Senate, and committees in both chambers conducted extensive hearings. PCV organized written and verbal testimony by a wide range of people, including people experienced with the adoption and implementation of the law in Oregon, and numerous individuals with deeply personal and family stories. The underlying theme was freedom to choose. Repeatedly, independent polls showed Vermonters favored the bill by two to one, across political parties and religions. Many individuals with disabilities testified in favor of the legislation because people with disabilities, like everyone else, want to control their own medical decisions when diagnosed with a terminal illness. Opposition was strong and vocal, raising a number of concerns. PCV persistently presented the facts from Oregon.

PCV worked strategically through the years to build knowledge and support among legislators and legislative leadership. It took time and citizen action to educate representatives about freedom of choice at the end of life. Throughout Vermont, the proposed legislation gained attention and supporters because of letters to the editor and media accounts.

Some PCV Board members spoke at Rotary Clubs, at gatherings at the homes of supporters and at professional meetings of healthcare providers. PCV expanded its database of supporters by setting up DWD displays and collecting signatures at Town Meetings, which take place every year throughout Vermont in the month of March. Among PCV's thousands of supporters were activists who contacted legislators, wrote letters to the editor, and contributed to the campaign. During the most active part of the campaign, PCV engaged a grassroots organizing firm to activate a database by organizing telephone trees, continually updating the website, posting on social media, using email and snail mail and setting up TV ads.

Although the Vermont Medical Association testified that Act 39 was not needed, PCV developed a list of 200 supporting physicians. They understood that for the terminally ill patient, just knowing that it's legal to avoid a protracted painful dying process brings peace of mind.

By 2013, Vermont had a Governor who was a committed advocate for DWD. The Speaker of the House, a strong and determined leader, also was eager to see the legislation passed. To achieve a majority vote in the Senate, a compromise consisting of a “sunset” provision that would have allowed most of the safeguards to disappear in 2016 was necessary. PCV celebrated passage but was concerned that weakening the required safeguards would make the law vulnerable to repeal.

In 2015, Act 39 was revised to remove the sunset provision, and the final bill was signed on May 20, 2015, thereby solidifying Vermont's Act 39. The Governor, the House Speaker, legislators and thousands of ordinary Vermonters came together to establish the Patient Choice at End of Life Act.

== Impact ==
Twenty-four prescriptions have been written within the first three years after inception of Vermont's Act 39. Sixteen of them were written in 2016, showing a careful, steady utilization increase.

== Opposition ==
In July, 2016 the Vermont Alliance for Ethical Healthcare and Tennessee-based Christian Medical and Dental Association filed a lawsuit against the State of Vermont. The groups claim both Act 39 and Vermont's Patient Rights law violate the plaintiffs’ religious rights by requiring doctors to discuss all end-of-life care options with their patients.

During the first hearing in the case on Nov. 8, the plaintiffs’ attorneys suggested his physician clients would be willing to “…tell a patient that they can Google assisted suicide on their cell phone and that's a reasonably available source of information…”

“The notion that doctors could fulfill their professional duty to ensure patients can make fully-informed decisions by Googling to learn about their end-of-life care options is the height of irresponsibility,” said Linda Waite-Simpson, Vermont state director for Compassion & Choices. “It would be tantamount to doctors abandoning their patients at the most vulnerable time of their lives, especially given the danger of them Googling -- and relying upon -- fake news posted online.”

U.S. District Court Judge Geoffrey W. Crawford has granted a motion by Compassion & Choices, Patient Choices Vermont and two terminally ill Vermonters that allows them to argue in court against a lawsuit brought by religious groups to undermine Vermont's End-of-Life Choice Act (Act 39). In granting the motion to allow Compassion & Choices and Patient Choices Vermont to intervene in the case, Judge Crawford wrote: “As people potentially eligible for consideration under Act 39, both individual (patient) intervenors have strong personal reasons for resisting the type of silence or boycott which Plaintiffs seek to preserve for themselves on an issue of patient choice … the intervenor organizations (Compassion & Choices and Patient Choices Vermont) appear to have considerable experience in the field. The court welcomes their advice and expertise…”

“The Vermont law respects everyone’s personal beliefs because it allows any person or healthcare professional to refuse to directly participate in medical aid in dying,” said Kevin Díaz, national director of legal advocacy for Compassion & Choices. “But these doctors contend their personal beliefs should trump their patients’ rights when it comes to simply referring them to a healthcare professional to advise them about all their end-of-life care options. It should send shivers down the spine of every patient.”

“This case is about a patient’s right to know what their options are at the end of life,” said Betsy Walkerman, President of Patient Choices Vermont. “Physicians should not impose their personal religious values on their patients by preventing them from receiving information about all of their end-of-life care options.”

On April 5, 2017, U.S. District Court Judge Geoffrey Crawford ruled that two medical organizations failed to show that their members — two doctors, a nurse and a pharmacist who oppose the law for religious and ethical reasons — faced any harm and dismissed their legal challenge of Vermont's 2013 end-of-life law.

== See also ==
- Assisted suicide in the United States
- Medical aid in dying
- California End of Life Option Act
- Compassion & Choices, providing medical consultation and direct service for persons eligible for the Vermont Death with Dignity law.
- Death with Dignity National Center, an organization founded to pass and support the law.
- Oregon Ballot Measure 16 (1994)
- Oregon Death with Dignity Act, Vermont's Act 39 was modelled after Oregon's law
- Washington Death with Dignity Act, passed in November 2008 in the state of Washington
- Massachusetts Death with Dignity Initiative
- Baxter v. Montana, a court decision legalizing aid in dying in Montana
- Gonzales v. Oregon
- Washington v. Glucksberg
- Voluntary Assisted Dying Act 2017 (Victoria)
