= 2016 Colorado Proposition 106 =

Ballot measure legalizing assisted dying in Colorado

- November 8, 2016
- Access to Medical Aid in Dying Initiative

Results
Choice	Votes	%
Yes	1,765,786	64.87%
No	956,263	35.13%
Total votes	2,722,049	100.00%
County results
Yes
80–90%
70–80%
60–70%
50–60%
No
60–70%
50–60%

Proposition 106, the Access to Medical Aid in Dying Initiative, was an initiated state statute that appeared on the November 8, 2016, ballot in the state of Colorado. The measure enacted the End of Life Options Act, legalizing assisted dying for patients with a terminal illness who are expected to die within six months.

The proposition was approved by nearly 65% of Colorado voters, making Colorado the sixth U.S. state to legalize assisted dying. Led by assisted dying advocacy group Compassion & Choices, proponents of Proposition 106 included then-governor John Hickenlooper and a number of Democratic state lawmakers. The measure faced opposition from religious organizations, including the Church of Jesus Christ of Latter-day Saints, as well as some disability rights advocates, who criticized the measure's lack of safeguards against coercion.

Following the proposition's approval, nearly one-third of Colorado hospitals and some of the state's largest healthcare providers chose not to facilitate assisted dying, resulting in disputes over the implementation of the law. In 2019, a terminally ill patient and his physician sued Catholic/Adventist healthcare provider Centura Health for refusing to prescribe aid-in-dying medication. A separate federal lawsuit filed in 2025 challenged the law's Colorado residency requirement on constitutional grounds, but was voluntarily dismissed later that year following the plaintiff's death.

== Background ==
=== Legislative efforts ===
Democratic legislators Lois Court and Joann Ginal first introduced assisted suicide legislation in February 2015 to the Colorado House of Representatives, with the bill failing 8–5 in the relevant committee. In 2016, Court and Ginal proposed similar legislation, but withdrew the bill the morning it was due to be voted on after realizing they had insufficient support from colleagues.

That same year, the Access to Medical Aid in Dying Initiative was certified for the November 2016 ballot after returning 160,000 voter signatures of support to the Colorado secretary of state. The wording of the proposition was modeled on Oregon's Measure 16, which legalized assisted dying in the state in 1994.

=== Effect ===
Before the End of Life Options Act went into effect on December 16, 2016, aiding another person in ending their life was a crime of felony manslaughter in Colorado, with assisted dying legalized in only five states. (Note: California, Montana, Oregon, Vermont, and Washington.) After Proposition 106 went into effect, aiding the assisting dying process was decriminalized, though patients must self-administer the aid-in-dying medication after receiving a prescription from a doctor. (Note: In 2024, the legislation was updated to expand the ability to evaluate terminally ill patients and prescribe aid-in-dying medication to advanced practice registered nurses.)

Proposition 106 permits terminally ill patients with a life expectancy of six months or less (Note: Must be agreed upon by two separate physicians.) to self-administer drugs in order to voluntarily end their lives. Patients must be over 18, mentally capable, able to make an informed decision, and able to self-administer and ingest the drugs. To be eligible for assisted dying, a patient must write one written request with two witnesses present, as well as two verbal requests. Legally, patients must be informed that they can opt out of taking aid-in-dying medication after they receive it.

The proposition also allows terminally ill patients to have aid-in-dying medication directly prescribed to them by a physician, rather than go through a health system. Health providers and facilities are not legally required by Proposition 106 to prescribe or dispense aid-in-dying medication. The End of Life Options Act also criminalized coercing a terminally ill patient into requesting aid-in-dying drugs, though hospital staff and physicians "acting in good faith" under the act were granted immunity from civil and criminal liability.

== Campaign ==
=== Support ===
Compassion & Choices, which advocates for the legalization of assisted dying, raised over $5 million in support of Proposition 106. The organization argued that patients facing an "agonizing, painful death" should have the right to end their lives. Prominent individual donors included author T. A. Barron, art collector Hester Diamond, and philanthropist Eleanor Caulkins.

Speaking to Colorado Public Radio in September 2016, then-governor John Hickenlooper expressed support for Proposition 106 and said that "maybe it's the Libertarian streak in me, but ... [terminally ill patients should] have the final say themselves". Hickenlooper noted his disagreement with the use of the word 'suicide' by opponents of the proposition, saying "these people are going to die anyway".

Julie Selsberg, one of the two citizens who started the initiative to put the End of Life Options Act on the ballot, told Westword she had begun to advocate for medical aid-in-dying after her terminally ill father was unable to receive aid-in-dying drugs before his death. Selsberg's father requested she write to state legislators to persuade them into introducing assisted dying for Colorado residents, despite knowing he would not live long enough to take advantage of his proposal. Her father also asked legislators to introduce assisted dying bills in an opinion piece for The Denver Post titled "Please, I want to die", prompting his local state representative Lois Court to reply promising to legislate for assisted dying medication. Court's response was read by Selsberg to her father shortly before he died by choosing to stop taking any nutrition in the absence of aid-in-dying drugs. Court and fellow representative Joann Ginal went on to unsuccessfully propose assisted dying legislation for multiple years before Selsberg had the opportunity to propose a citizen-initiated ballot measure, which both legislators quickly endorsed.

=== Opposition ===
Proposition 106 received widespread opposition from religious groups, including both local and national archdioceses and the Church of Jesus Christ of Latter-day Saints. The Archdiocese of Denver donated more than $1.6 million to a committee campaigning against Proposition 106, while evangelical organization Focus on the Family donated $20,000. Business executive Richard D. McCormick and Nebraska governor Pete Ricketts donated $10,000 each, making them the largest individual donors against Proposition 106. Colorado Christian University and the Archdiocese of Denver described the proposition as "fatally flawed", arguing that the measure lacked wording to prohibit patients from doctor shopping to receive a prescription for aid-in-dying drugs.

Thomas S. Monson, the then-president of the LDS Church, and his counselors issued a letter to Colorado's Mormon community urging them to "let their voices be heard in opposition to measures that would legalize physician-assisted suicide." The letter noted that while Mormons are permitted discretion regarding end-of-life decisions for their relatives, the church's policy guide Handbook 2 explicitly discourages ending a life "even when the person may be suffering from an incurable condition or disease."

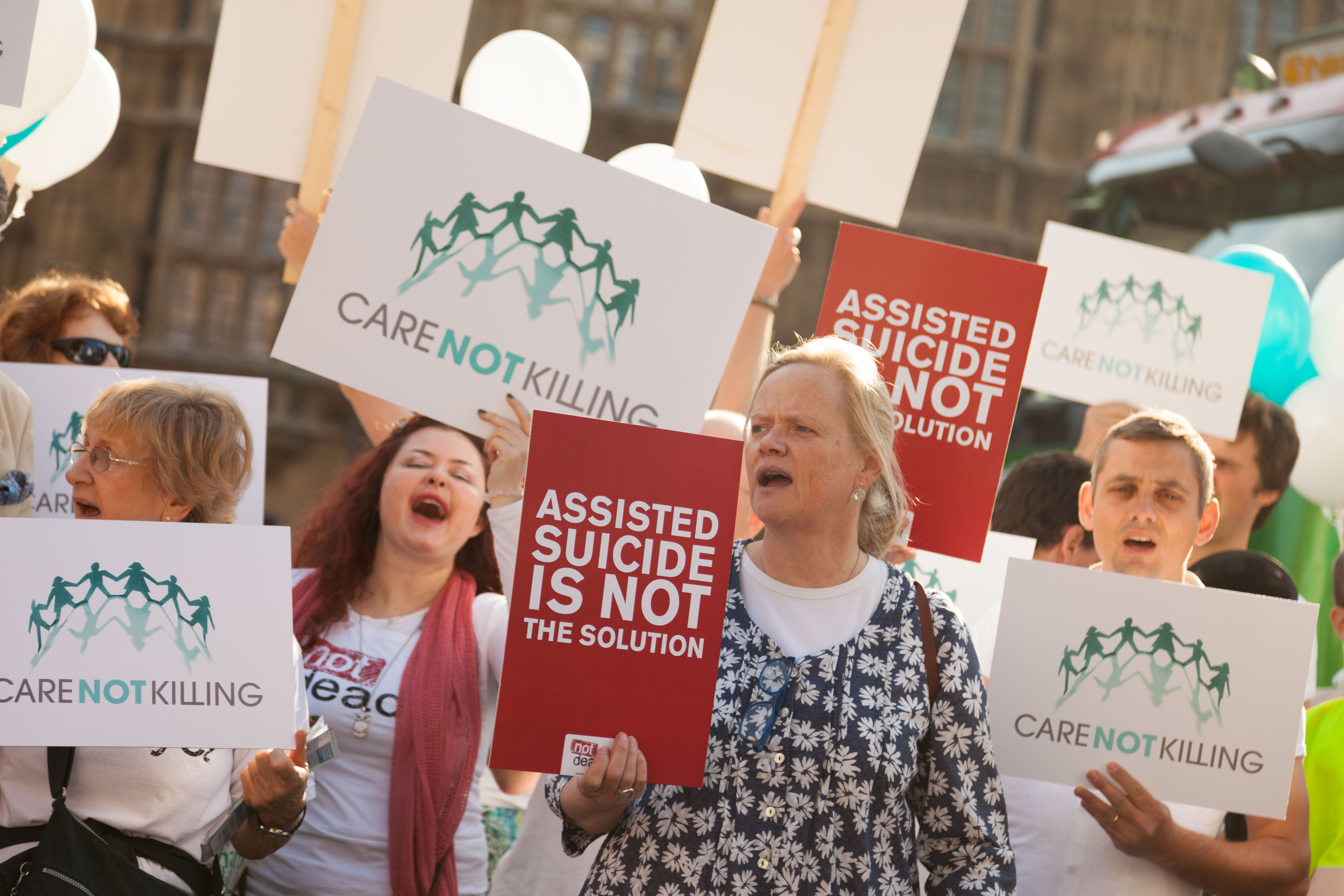
Not Dead Yet activists protesting against assisted dying in 2015

Disability rights group Not Dead Yet opposed Proposition 106. Carrie Ann Lucas, a member of Not Dead Yet Colorado, said that the End of Life Options Act lacks safeguards to prevent terminally ill patients from being pressured into taking aid-in-dying medication. Lucas also criticized the bill for not requiring an unaffiliated witness to be present while the patient self-administers the medication.

Some opponents of Proposition 106 believed legalizing assisted dying would worsen Colorado's suicide rates, which were the seventh highest in the nation at the time. The Colorado Springs Gazette opposed the proposition in an editorial piece, calling suicide a "crisis" that would be worsened by the legalization of assisted dying, while The Denver Post said Proposition 106 "lacks proper safeguards" to prevent misuse and could increase the state's suicide rates. Similarly, leading Catholic bishops criticized supporters for "promot[ing] and/or facilitat[ing] suicide ... while recognizing suicide as a serious statewide public health concern", in reference to a statewide zero-suicide initiative introduced two years prior.

== Endorsements ==
Yes

Statewide officials

- John Hickenlooper, governor of Colorado (2011–2019) (Democratic) (Note: Since 2021, Hickenlooper has represented Colorado in the U.S. Senate.)
- Cary Kennedy, former state treasurer of Colorado (2007–2011) (Democratic)
- J.D. MacFarlane, former attorney general of Colorado (1975–1983) (Democratic)

State legislators

- Greg Brophy, former state senator from the 1st district (2005–2015) (Republican)
- Joann Ginal, state representative from the 52nd district (2013–2019) (Democratic)
- Lois Court, state representative from the 6th district (2009–2017) (Democratic)
- Lucía Guzmán, state senator from the 34th district (2010–2019) (Democratic)
- Michael Merrifield, state senator from the 11th district (2015–2019) (Democratic)

Individuals

- Dan Diaz, consultant and widower of Brittany Maynard

Political parties

- Libertarian Party of Colorado

Organizations

- ACLU of Colorado
- Compassion & Choices
- Denver Medical Society
- ProgressNow
- NARAL Pro-Choice

Newspapers

- Aurora Sentinel
- Coloradoan
- Colorado Springs Independent
- Greeley Tribune
- The Pueblo Chieftain
- The Durango Herald
No

U.S. representatives

- Bob Beauprez, former CO-07 (2003–2007) (Republican)
- Doug Lamborn, CO-05 (2007–2025) (Republican)

Statewide officials

- Pete Ricketts, governor of Nebraska (2015–2023) (Republican)

State legislators

- Larry Crowder, state senator from the 35th district (2013–2021) (Republican)

Individuals

- Thomas S. Monson, president of the Church of Jesus Christ of Latter-day Saints (2008–2018)
- Henry B. Eyring, first counselor in the First Presidency of the LDS (2008–2018)
- Dieter F. Uchtdorf, second counselor in the First Presidency of the LDS (2008–2018)

Organizations

- Archdiocese of Denver
- Archdiocese of Kansas City
- Archdiocese of Colorado Springs
- Colorado Christian University
- Colson Center
- Focus on the Family
- The Church of Jesus Christ of Latter-day Saints

Newspapers

- Colorado Springs Gazette
- The Denver Post
- Longmont Times-Call
- Loveland Reporter-Herald
Declined to endorse

Labor unions

- AFL-CIO Colorado

Organizations

- Colorado Medical Society

== Polling ==
Poll source	Date(s) administered	Sample size (Note: Key: A – all adults RV – registered voters LV – likely voters V – unclear)	Margin of error	Yes	No	Undecided
Franklin & Marshall-Colorado Mesa University	September 14–18, 2016	540 (RV)	± 5.10%	70%	22%	8%

== Results ==
Proposition 106
Choice	Votes	%
For	1,765,786	64.87
Against	956,263	35.13
Total	2,722,049	100.00
Source: Colorado Secretary of State

=== By county ===
County	For		Against		Total votes cast
County	#	%	#	%	Total votes cast
Adams	116,982	62.48%	70,236	37.52%	187,218
Alamosa	3,924	57.16%	2,941	42.84%	6,865
Arapahoe	191,899	64.39%	106,120	35.61%	298,019
Archuleta	4,442	62.59%	2,655	37.41%	7,097
Baca	789	37.77%	1,300	62.23%	2,089
Bent	854	45.38%	1,028	54.62%	1,882
Boulder	144,331	79.43%	37,380	20.57%	181,711
Broomfield	25,392	68.23%	11,823	31.77%	37,215
Chaffee	7,462	66.81%	3,707	33.19%	11,169
Cheyenne	398	36.58%	690	63.42%	1,088
Clear Creek	4,281	74.01%	1,503	25.99%	5,784
Conejos	1,492	37.73%	2,462	62.27%	3,954
Costilla	935	52.74%	838	47.26%	1,773
Crowley	681	45.43%	818	54.57%	1,499
Custer	1,674	54.92%	1,374	45.08%	3,048
Delta	9,328	56.15%	7,286	43.85%	16,614
Denver	241,720	74.70%	81,884	25.30%	323,604
Dolores	688	56.86%	522	43.14%	1,210
Douglas	113,661	61.41%	71,419	38.59%	185,080
Eagle	18,878	77.04%	5,626	22.96%	24,504
El Paso	173,136	55.39%	139,437	44.61%	312,573
Elbert	8,916	56.39%	6,896	43.61%	15,812
Fremont	12,051	55.57%	9,636	44.43%	21,687
Garfield	17,844	68.69%	8,134	31.31%	25,978
Gilpin	2,681	76.10%	842	23.90%	3,523
Grand	5,874	68.77%	2,668	31.23%	8,542
Gunnison	7,163	77.04%	2,135	22.96%	9,298
Hinsdale	389	65.38%	206	34.62%	595
Huerfano	2,215	59.69%	1,496	40.31%	3,711
Jackson	536	64.58%	294	35.42%	830
Jefferson	215,340	66.31%	109,384	33.69%	324,724
Kiowa	333	40.46%	490	59.54%	823
Kit Carson	1,662	46.10%	1,943	53.90%	3,605
La Plata	22,134	74.16%	7,713	25.84%	29,847
Lake	2,182	69.76%	946	30.24%	3,128
Larimer	128,051	67.00%	63,057	33.00%	191,108
Las Animas	3,530	53.36%	3,085	46.64%	6,615
Lincoln	1,146	47.99%	1,242	52.01%	2,388
Logan	4,615	48.33%	4,934	51.67%	9,549
Mesa	45,877	60.37%	30,118	39.63%	75,995
Mineral	440	68.54%	202	31.46%	642
Moffat	3,569	56.14%	2,788	43.86%	6,357
Montezuma	7,425	59.30%	5,097	40.70%	12,522
Montrose	11,874	57.06%	8,934	42.94%	20,808
Morgan	5,955	50.74%	5,782	49.26%	11,737
Otero	3,970	46.74%	4,523	53.26%	8,493
Ouray	2,421	74.47%	830	25.53%	3,251
Park	6,841	66.54%	3,440	33.46%	10,281
Phillips	903	39.43%	1,387	60.57%	2,290
Pitkin	8,565	85.47%	1,456	14.53%	10,021
Prowers	2,152	43.84%	2,757	56.16%	4,909
Pueblo	45,025	57.60%	33,137	42.40%	78,162
Rio Blanco	1,819	54.31%	1,530	45.69%	3,349
Rio Grande	2,838	51.02%	2,725	48.98%	5,563
Routt	10,633	77.29%	3,124	22.71%	13,757
Saguache	1,732	63.21%	1,008	36.79%	2,740
San Juan	367	77.26%	108	22.73%	475
San Miguel	3,576	85.80%	592	14.20%	4,168
Sedgwick	694	51.60%	651	48.40%	1,345
Summit	12,283	77.91%	3,483	22.08%	15,766
Teller	7,868	55.72%	6,252	44.28%	14,120
Washington	1,063	39.58%	1,623	60.42%	2,686
Weld	76,285	57.73%	55,858	42.27%	132,143
Yuma	2,002	42.51%	2,708	57.49%	4,710
Total	1,765,786	64.87%	956,263	35.13%	2,722,049

=== Analysis ===
Almost four-fifths of Colorado's 64 counties supported Proposition 106, with 13 of the 14 counties in opposition to the proposition being in Eastern Colorado. Every county that voted against Proposition 106 concurrently voted for Donald Trump in the 2016 presidential election, while all counties that supported Hillary Clinton also supported the proposition. 28 counties voted for Trump while approving Proposition 106.

Conejos County, which has a 45% Mormon population, rejected Proposition 106 by a 24-point margin. Quin Monson, a professor of political science at Brigham Young University, said before the election that public opposition to Proposition 106 from Church leaders would have a significant impact on the way Colorado's 145,000 Mormons would vote, stating that "[w]e have a lot of direct evidence that these messages work."

== Aftermath ==
From 2017 to 2021, a total of 777 Colorado residents were prescribed aid-in-dying drugs, with 583 of those prescriptions dispensed. Almost 75% of those prescribed aid-in-dying medication were over 65 years old, while 85% were in hospice care.

As of 2017, around two thirds of Colorado hospitals have chosen to offer medical aid-in-dying, including Denver Health. Health systems Centura Health, SCL Health, and HealthOne chose not to change their practices after Proposition 106, while UCHealth and Kaiser Permanente Colorado began to adopt medical aid-in-dying.

After over 30 Colorado hospitals announced they would not offer medical aid-in-dying, supporters of the End of Life Options Act warned that hospitals cannot prohibit doctors from writing prescriptions for aid-in-dying drugs that patients would self-administer at home. A spokesperson for Compassion & Choices said that "it's quite frankly despicable that a hospital would hedge their bet on whether a terminally ill person wants to wage a legal battle in the last few months of their life," foreseeing that patients would file a lawsuit to force non-participating hospitals to prescribe them aid-in-dying drugs.

=== Legal challenges ===
In August 2019, a terminally ill patient, Cornelius "Neil" Mahoney, and his doctor, Barbara Morris, filed a lawsuit against Centura Health for prohibiting Morris from prescribing aid-in-dying medication to Mahoney. Morris worked for a Centura hospital and personally supported Mahoney's right to end his life, but was overruled by her employer – a Catholic hospital which has described assisted dying as "intrinsically evil" and "morally unacceptable". Mahoney and Morris asked the court to prohibit Centura Health from penalizing any doctor who prescribes aid-in-dying medication, and Morris was subsequently fired by the hospital. In their response, the hospital claimed that they were protected under the First Amendment and that prescribing patients with aid-in-dying medication would violate the Hippocratic Oath.

Mahoney ended his life in November 2019 after being prescribed aid-in-dying drugs by a family physician, and the following month, Centura Health filed a counterclaim asking a judge to declare that a healthcare organization cannot be forced to allow its employees to support or carry out provisions of the End of Life Options Act. While a district court sided with Centura Health, Morris appealed the decision and the Colorado Court of Appeals chose to reverse the lower court's ruling in April 2023. Eight months later, the Supreme Court of Colorado denied Centura Health's application for a writ of certiorari and declined to review the decision made in the Court of Appeals; the case was later settled.

In May 2025, advocacy group Compassion & Choices filed a federal lawsuit on behalf of a Minnesota resident and two Colorado physicians – including Barbara Morris – arguing that a requirement in Colorado's law that a patient seeking aid-in-dying medication must reside in the state violates the United States Constitution's guarantee of equal treatment. In November of the same year, Compassion & Choices voluntarily dismissed the case after the Minnesota-based patient died.

=== Further debate and legislation ===
In 2022, Denver-based doctor Jennifer Gaudiani published a case study in which she revealed she had helped three patients with anorexia nervosa access aid-in-dying medication. The paper also advocated for legalizing assisted dying for patients dying of anorexia, a position criticized by the director of the eating disorders program at Johns Hopkins Hospital as "alarming" and "fraught with problems." In an opinion piece with the National Review, philosopher Wesley J. Smith called the case study "awful" and accused Gaudiani of abandoning her patients.

==== Senate Bill 68 ====
In early 2024, assisted dying supporters began to advocate for new legislation to increase access to aid-in-dying drugs. Writing for The Colorado Sun, one advocate referenced Proposition 106's passing by saying that "statewide support for the option of medical aid-in-dying does not equate to reasonable access to the resources needed to obtain it", while criticizing the state's 15-day waiting period between the two mandatory verbal requests required to be eligible for aid-in-dying drugs as "unnecessary red tape".

In January 2024, Ginal, now a member of the Colorado Senate, and state representative Kyle Brown sponsored Senate Bill 68, which sought to expand access to assisted dying by reducing the waiting period from 15 days to a week. The bill, which was approved by both chambers of the Colorado state legislature before being signed into law on June 5, 2024, also allows advanced practice registered nurses to approve aid-in-dying medication and permits physicians to waive the waiting period in cases where a patient is unlikely to survive more than 48 hours but meets the other qualifications for eligibility.

== See also ==
- 1994 Oregon Ballot Measure 16
- 2012 Massachusetts Question 2
- Washington Death with Dignity Act
