= Death with Dignity Act =

Death with Dignity Act may refer to:

- California End of Life Option Act, 2016
- Oregon Death with Dignity Act, 1994
- Washington Death with Dignity Act, 2008
- Advance Directives Act, Texas law passed in 1999

== See also ==
- Assisted suicide in the United States
- Death with dignity (disambiguation)
- End-of-life care
- Euthanasia
- Carrie & Lowell, a track on a music album
