= George Eighmey =

American politician

Member of the Oregon House of Representatives from the 14th district
- In office 1993–1999

Personal details
- Born: May 3, 1941 (age 85) Chicago, Illinois
- Party: Democratic
- Education: University of Illinois
- Profession: Attorney
- Husband: Peter Livingston

George V. Eighmey (pronounced /ˈeɪmi/; born May 3, 1941), is an American politician who was a member of the Oregon House of Representatives. He served from 1993 to 1999. During his time in the Oregon House, he was an advocate for the Death with Dignity Act, which was passed in 1994 after a statewide vote. Eighmey was also the first openly gay man elected to the Oregon Legislature when he won election in 1994. He is a former director of Compassion & Choices of Oregon and a current board member with the Death with Dignity National Center.

Eighmey attended the University of Illinois, earning Bachelor of Science and juris doctor degrees. He is an attorney by profession and also served in the United States Air Force briefly in the 1960s. He retired in 2010.
