= Death with dignity (disambiguation) =

Death with dignity may refer to:

- Dignified death – Ethical concept about the end of life
- Euthanasia – Intentionally ending a life to relieve pain and suffering
- Death with Dignity Act (disambiguation)
- Death with Dignity National Center – US nonprofit organization

See also

- Dignity in Dying – UK pro-euthanasia organisation
- "Death with Dignity" – 2015 Sufjan Stevens album
