= Washington Death with Dignity Act =

Referendum legalizing some assisted suicide

Initiative 1000
- Washington Death with Dignity Act

Results
Choice	Votes	%
Yes	1,715,219	57.82%
No	1,251,255	42.18%
Total votes	3,071,587	100.00%

Yes:
50–60%
60–70%
70–80%
No:
50–60%

Initiative 1000 (I-1000) of 2008 established the U.S. state of Washington's Death with Dignity Act (RCW 70.245), which legalizes medical aid in dying with certain restrictions. Passage of this initiative made Washington the second U.S. state to permit some terminally ill patients to determine the time of their own death. The effort was headed by former Governor Booth Gardner.

The measure was approved in the November 4, 2008 general election. 1,715,219 votes (57.82%) were cast in favor, 1,251,255 votes (42.18%) against. There were 2,966,474 votes total. 30 of the state's 39 counties voted in favor of the initiative.

In 1991, the similar initiative 119 was rejected by Washington voters by a margin of 54 percent to 46 percent. I-119 would have allowed doctors to prescribe a lethal dosage of medication, and also to administer it if the terminally ill patient could not self-administer. Unlike that initiative, I-1000 requires the patient to ingest the medication unassisted.

The initiative is based on Oregon Measure 16, which Oregon voters passed in 1994 but was not implemented until 1997. At that time, Oregon was the only other state to have enacted a medical aid in dying law. As of 2026, 13 states and Washington, D.C. have enacted similar legislation.

== Specific provisions in the initiative ==
The official ballot summary for the measure, slightly amended following a February 2008 court challenge, is, "This measure would permit terminally ill, competent, adult Washington residents medically predicted to die within six months to request and self-administer lethal medication prescribed by a physician. The measure requires two oral and one written request, two physicians to diagnose the patient and determine the patient is competent, a waiting period, and physician verification of an informed patient decision. Physicians, patients and others acting in good faith compliance would have criminal and civil immunity."

Provisions in the law include:

- The patient must be an adult (18 or over) resident of the state of Washington
- The patient must be mentally competent, verified by two health care providers (or referred to a mental health evaluation). While the original language of the Death with Dignity Act required patients to be evaluated by two physicians, the law was amended in 2023 to allow advanced practice registered nurses and physician assistants to serve as a patient's attending and/or consulting provider
- The patient must be terminally ill with less than 6 months to live, verified by two providers
- The patient must make voluntary requests, without coercion, verified by two providers
- The patient must be informed of all other options including palliative and hospice care
- There is a 7-day waiting period between the first oral request and a written request. Originally a 15-day waiting period, this provision was amended in 2023
- There was previously a 48-hour waiting period between the written request and the writing of the prescription; this was repealed in 2023
- The written request must be signed by two independent witnesses, at least one of whom is not related to the patient or employed by the health care facility
- The patient is encouraged to discuss with family (not required because of confidentiality laws)
- The patient may change their mind at any time and rescind the request
- The attending provider may sign the patient's death certificate which must list the underlying terminal disease as the cause of death

== Supporters ==
The campaign was run by a coalition that includes former Washington governor, Booth Gardner. aid-in-dying advocates from Oregon, the Death with Dignity National Center, Compassion & Choices, Compassion & Choices of Washington, Compassion & Choices of Oregon. The name of the official political advocacy group working on the campaign was changed from "It's My Decision" to "YES on 1000".

State Senator Darlene Fairley, who chairs the Death with Dignity Disabilities Caucus, said that "as a matter of personal control and autonomy, it makes sense to let patients themselves decide what kind of medical care they want to receive and how long they want to suffer with a terminal illness."

State Representative Jamie Pedersen, chair of LGBT for 1000, said, "people facing terminal illnesses gain peace of mind from knowing that their end-of-life choices will be respected. Everyone deserves that respect and can appreciate its importance." Organizations that supported I-1000 include the American Medical Student Association, the American Medical Women's Association, the Lifelong AIDS Association, the ACLU, the National Women's Law Center, the Washington Chapter of the National Association of Social Workers, and the Washington State Public Health Association.

The Washington State Psychology Association was neutral on I-1000, but found that "patients choose aid in dying because of a desire for autonomy and the wish to avoid loss of dignity and control, not because of a poor mental state, lack of resources or social support," and "the law has had a positive effect in terms of significant improvements in palliative care."

The Newcastle News endorsed the measure in an October 7, 2008, editorial. "Some opponents of I-1000 will refer to the life-death option as assisted suicide, but this has no resemblance to suicide. It is a humane end to a life that is already ending," the editorial said.

== Opposition ==
The Coalition Against Assisted Suicide opposed the measure. It included doctors and nurses, disability rights advocates and organizations, hospice workers, minorities, right-to-life organizations, the Catholic Church and other Christian organizations, and politicians.

The organization held that the danger of making doctors the agents of a patient's death far outweighed any advantages to assisted suicide, or safeguards in the initiative's text. They felt that legalization of assisted suicide would put pressure on minorities, the disabled, and the poor.

Actor Martin Sheen appeared in television ads opposing Initiative 1000. There has been some debate over one of Sheen's statements: persons with depression can be given a lethal dose without prior professional assessment. According to the Washington Death with Dignity act, "Medication to end a patient's life in a humane and dignified manner shall not be prescribed until the person performing the counseling determines that the patient is not suffering from a psychiatric or psychological disorder or depression causing impaired judgment." This issue has been explored in the field of medical ethics.

== Results ==
Washington Initiative 1000 (Approved)
Choice	Votes	%
For	1,715,219	57.82
Against	1,251,255	42.18
Total	2,966,474	100.00
Registered voters/turnout	3,630,118	84.61

=== By county ===
County results
County	Yes		No		Margin		Total votes
County	#	%	#	%	#	%	Total votes
Adams	2,008	44.35%	2,520	55.65%	-512	-11.31%	4,528
Asotin	5,391	55.92%	4,249	44.08%	1,142	11.85%	9,640
Benton	35,493	49.30%	36,499	50.70%	-1,006	-1.40%	71,992
Chelan	16,226	51.59%	15,225	48.41%	1,001	3.18%	31,451
Clallam	22,976	60.67%	14,894	39.33%	8,082	21.34%	37,870
Clark	101,043	56.44%	77,975	43.56%	23,068	12.89%	179,018
Columbia	1,172	53.08%	1,036	46.92%	136	6.16%	2,208
Cowlitz	24,675	55.77%	19,573	44.23%	5,102	11.53%	44,248
Douglas	7,231	48.06%	7,816	51.94%	-585	-3.89%	15,047
Ferry	1,914	56.01%	1,503	43.99%	411	12.03%	3,417
Franklin	8,329	42.97%	11,054	57.03%	-2,725	-14.06%	19,383
Garfield	591	44.04%	751	55.96%	-160	-11.92%	1,342
Grant	12,408	45.69%	14,749	54.31%	-2,341	-8.62%	27,157
Grays Harbor	17,553	60.52%	11,450	39.48%	6,103	21.04%	29,003
Island	24,338	58.80%	17,052	41.20%	7,286	17.60%	41,390
Jefferson	14,242	72.15%	5,497	27.85%	8,745	44.30%	19,739
King	572,504	64.54%	314,576	35.46%	257,928	29.08%	887,080
Kitsap	71,474	58.17%	51,407	41.83%	20,067	16.33%	122,881
Kittitas	9,834	56.10%	7,695	43.90%	2,139	12.20%	17,529
Klickitat	5,917	59.52%	4,025	40.48%	1,892	19.03%	9,942
Lewis	17,413	50.70%	16,933	49.30%	480	1.40%	34,346
Lincoln	2,828	48.42%	3,013	51.58%	-185	-3.17%	5,841
Mason	17,122	61.05%	10,923	38.95%	6,199	22.10%	28,045
Okanogan	9,274	56.20%	7,227	43.80%	2,047	12.41%	16,501
Pacific	6,888	64.12%	3,854	35.88%	3,034	28.24%	10,742
Pend Oreille	3,359	51.80%	3,125	48.20%	234	3.61%	6,484
Pierce	173,531	53.54%	150,571	46.46%	22,960	7.08%	324,102
San Juan	7,742	75.32%	2,537	24.68%	5,205	50.64%	10,279
Skagit	31,636	57.20%	23,670	42.80%	7,966	14.40%	55,306
Skamania	3,354	62.43%	2,018	37.57%	1,336	24.87%	5,372
Snohomish	174,968	55.82%	138,504	44.18%	36,464	11.63%	313,472
Spokane	112,164	51.70%	104,796	48.30%	7,368	3.40%	216,960
Stevens	10,868	49.19%	11,227	50.81%	-359	-1.62%	22,095
Thurston	76,939	61.70%	47,752	38.30%	29,187	23.41%	124,691
Wahkiakum	1,410	62.20%	857	37.80%	553	24.39%	2,267
Walla Walla	12,349	50.80%	11,958	49.20%	391	1.61%	24,307
Whatcom	56,354	57.62%	41,452	42.38%	14,902	15.24%	97,806
Whitman	9,664	56.00%	7,593	44.00%	2,071	12.00%	17,257
Yakima	32,037	42.30%	43,699	57.70%	-11,662	-15.40%	75,736
Totals	1,715,219	57.82%	1,251,255	42.18%	463,964	15.64%	2,966,474

== See also ==
- Act 39 in Vermont, the first state to pass a death with dignity law by legislative action
- California End of Life Option Act
- 1994 Oregon Ballot Measure 16, a ballot initiative passed in 1994 in the neighboring state of Oregon
- Baxter v. Montana, a court decision legalizing aid in dying in Montana.
- Washington v. Glucksberg, a 1997 Supreme Court decision upholding the State of Washington's Natural Death Act of 1979, a ban on assisted dying that the Death with Dignity Act repealed.
- 2012 Massachusetts Question 2
- 2016 Colorado Proposition 106
- Assisted suicide in the United States
- Compassion and Choices
- Voluntary Assisted Dying Act 2017 (Victoria)
