= Euthanasia Prevention Coalition =

Non-profit organization opposing euthanasia

Euthanasia Prevention Coalition (EPC) is a non-profit organization that opposes euthanasia and assisted suicide in the world. It was founded by Alex Schadenberg, Dr. Barrie DeVeber and Jean Echlin in July 1998. Its headquarters are in London, Ontario, Canada.

== Legal cases ==
Euthanasia Prevention Coalition intervened for the first time following the attempted euthanasia of a disabled child in Niagara Falls in 2001. EPC organized petitions against the following bills: Bill C-407 in 2005; Bill C-562 in 2008; and Bill C-384 in 2009. EPC was granted the ability to intervene in three court cases in Canada: Hawryluck v. Scardoni in 2004; Rasouli v. Sunnybrook Health Services Center in 2011; and Carter v Canada (AG) in 2012.

== See also ==
- Euthanasia in Canada
- Euthanasia in the United States
- Euthanasia and the slippery slope
- Assisted suicide
- Assisted suicide in the United States
- Groningen Protocol
