= Timothy E. Quill =

American physician

Timothy E. Quill is an American physician specialising in palliative care at the University of Rochester Medical Center in Rochester, New York. He is also a board member of the Death with Dignity National Center in Portland, Oregon. Quill was the lead plaintiff in a case that eventually reached the Supreme Court of the United States in 1997, Vacco v. Quill, in which the Court decided that a state law against physician-assisted suicide was constitutional.

Quill earned his undergraduate degree from Amherst College in 1971, and his M.D. from the University of Rochester School of Medicine and Dentistry in 1976.

In 1991, Quill published an article in The New England Journal of Medicine describing how he assisted in the suicide of Patricia Diane Trumbull, a 45-year-old leukemia patient referred to in the article as "Diane". The report describes how Patricia, a long-time patient of Quill's with an extensive medical history including vaginal cancer, alcoholism and other issues was diagnosed with leukemia but refused chemotherapy. She shortly thereafter decided that she wanted to kill herself rather than have a "lingering death" which doctors had told her may be a matter of weeks or months away. Quill describes in the article how he referred her to the Hemlock Society and a week later she requested barbiturates to help with "insomnia". He gave her a prescription and told her the amount required to treat both insomnia and the dose required to bring about death. Some time after getting the prescription, she said her final goodbyes to Quill and her family and took the barbiturates alone. Patricia's husband reported the death to Quill who reported the cause of death as acute leukemia but left off mention of the suicide in reporting it to the medical examiner. When interviewed by the New York Times in 1991, Quill stated that he had not helped anyone else to die before or since. No charges or indictments were brought against Quill. The publication of this story has been considered to have "made history" and to have "stunned the medical community".

Quill has subsequently been active in arguing for legalization of physician-assisted suicide, including during the controversial trials of Jack Kevorkian, and regarding the case of Terri Schiavo. Quill has argued against the principle of double effect in bioethics.

In 2013, the American Academy of Hospice and Palliative Medicine included Quill on a list of 'Hospice and Palliative Medicine Visionaries'.
