= California End of Life Option Act =

California law

California End of Life Option Act is a law enacted in June 2016 by the California State Legislature which allows terminally ill adult residents in the state of California to access medical aid in dying by self-administering lethal drugs, provided specific circumstances are met. The law was signed in by California governor Jerry Brown in October 2015, making California the fifth state to allow physicians to prescribe drugs to end the life of a terminally ill patient, often referred to as physician-assisted suicide.

In May 2018, a state trial court ruled that the law was unconstitutionally enacted, but the following month, the law was reinstated by a state appeals court; the law was affirmed by the California Supreme Court.

== History ==
Previous similar bills have been rejected on at least four other occasions in the state of California and residents voted against a proposal in a ballot in 1992, however a report published by Compassion and Choices collating more recent regional and national independent opinion polls on the right to die issue shows that the US public consistently supports or strongly supports medical aid in dying. Criticism has also come from Life Legal Defense Foundation who have stated that there is no way to tell whether the process is voluntary or whether some degree of persuasion may be involved.

In January 2015, Senate Bill 128 was introduced by Democratic Senators Lois Wolk and Bill Monning, eventually becoming PART 1.85. End of Life Option Act added to Division 1 of the California Health and Safety Code. The act includes definitions and procedures which must be fulfilled, a statement of request for aid-in-dying drugs which must be signed and witnessed and a final attestation of intent signed 48 hours before self-administering the drug. The bill was initially revealed by the family of right to die advocate Brittany Maynard, the 29-year-old terminally ill campaigner who had exercised her right to die in the state of Oregon in November of the previous year, and who had partnered with Compassion and Choices to become the public face of the right to die campaign. Maynard had been a resident of California, her family pointing out she would have preferred to die at home.

The bill was modeled on Oregon's Ballot Measure 16 Death with Dignity Act which has been in force since 1994, after the California Medical Association, which represents physicians in the state, withdrew its longstanding opposition on May 20, 2015, by the recommendation of its Council of Ethical Affairs.

In the run up to its enactment the bill received considerable opposition from religious organizations including the Catholic archdiocese and in July 2015 the bill was held up as it did not receive the required number of votes to proceed to the assembly health committee.

The California End of Life Option Act was signed into law by Governor Jerry Brown on October 5, 2015, with Brown taking the unusual step of releasing a personal statement in which he indicated his dilemma regarding the consideration of the ethical issues involved and that he felt unable to deny the right of choice to others.

The law went into effect on June 9, 2016, making California the fifth state to have a law enabling some of its residents to die of their own volition at a time of their choosing, after Oregon, Washington, Montana, and Vermont. Because the bill was passed during a special session, it did not take effect until June 2016. By the end of 2016, 250 people had exercised the right to begin the process, 191 received a prescription for the medication, of whom it is known 111 took their own lives, 21 dying of natural causes.

== Procedure ==
The law requires that an individual must be over the age of 18 and possessing full capacity to make an independent decision to end their own life, as well as be able to administer the drugs themself. Participation in all aspects of the bill is voluntary for all involved and the application must be made to both an attending and consulting physician with a gap of no fewer than 48 hours. The patient must also be certified by the physician as having a life limiting illness with estimated less than 6 months to live and other palliative care options must have been previously discussed and considered. The law does not specify which drugs must be prescribed.

Under the provisions of the law, if a person chooses to die in this manner, their death certificate only lists their underlying illness as the cause of death; no mention is made of the act or of suicide. According to CNN, this is done to protect patient confidentiality, in addition to avoiding potential legal complications regarding the decedent's estate and life insurance that may arise when a death is registered as a suicide.

== Reception ==
California residents who have spoken to the media to publicize the law and are known to have exercised their right to die include: ex-Peace Corps and homeless charity worker Robert Stone, former Marine and insurance broker Tom House, right-to-die campaigner Brittany Maynard who moved to Oregon to be able to fulfill her right to die, retired psychologist Tom Minor who initially failed to find a doctor to support him, actor René Auberjonois, Democratic politician Warren Church. and folksinger and political activist Barbara Dane.

It has been suggested that the bill may exclude Californians based on income and medical care coverage, with Medicare and other insurers not covering the cost of barbiturates to end life. Death With Dignity estimates the cost can reach $5,000 as of 2017.

Given that the cost for such drugs per individual runs between $1.50 and $50 compared to the inordinate cost of treatment for complex, life-threatening diseases like cancer, other critics express concern about disenfranchised Californians choosing assisted death because other options are too expensive. The law nevertheless makes overt coercion or deception of patients a felony.

In 2023, a coalition of disability rights groups began a lawsuit to have the Act repealed.

== See also ==
- Act 39 in Vermont
- Assisted suicide in the United States
- Baxter v. Montana
- Compassion and Choices
- Death with Dignity National Center
- Final Exit Network
- Medical aid in dying in the United States
- Oregon Death with Dignity Act
- Washington Death with Dignity Act
- Euthanasia in Australia
- Voluntary Assisted Dying Act 2017 (Victoria)
