= 1994 Oregon Ballot Measure 16 =

Referendum on medical aid in dying

Measure 16
- November 8, 1994
- Death with Dignity Act: Allows Terminally Ill Adults to Obtain Prescription for Lethal Drugs

Results
Choice	Votes	%
Yes	627,980	51.31%
No	596,018	48.69%
- County results Yes: 50–60% 60–70% No: 50–60% 60–70%

Measure 51
- November 4, 1997
- Would have repealed Measure 16 if successful; referred by legislature

Results
Choice	Votes	%
Yes	445,830	40.09%
No	666,275	59.91%
- County results Yes: 50-60% No: 50–60% 60–70%

Measure 16 of 1994 established the U.S. state of Oregon's Death with Dignity Act (ORS 127.800–995), which legalizes medical aid in dying (commonly referred to as physician-assisted suicide) with certain restrictions. Passage of this initiative made Oregon the first U.S. state and one of the first jurisdictions in the world to permit some terminally ill patients to determine the time of their own death.

The measure was narrowly approved in the November 8, 1994, general election. 627,980 votes (51.3%) were cast in favor, 596,018 votes (48.7%) against. An injunction delayed implementation of the Act until it was lifted on October 27, 1997. Measure 51, referred in the wake of the US Supreme Court's 1997 ruling in Washington v. Glucksberg by the state legislature in November 1997, sought to repeal the Death with Dignity Act, but was rejected by nearly 60% of voters. The act was challenged by the George W. Bush administration, but was upheld by the Supreme Court of the United States in Gonzales v. Oregon in 2006. Measure 16 Results by County:

County	Yes	Votes	No	Votes	Total
Baker	42.02	2,779	57.98	3,835	6,614
Benton	50.57	16,376	49.43	16,006	32,382
Clackamas	51.39	66,807	48.61	63,191	129,998
Clatsop	52.55	7,241	47.45	6,539	13,780
Columbia	52.29	8,454	47.71	7,714	16,168
Coos	49.99	12,270	50.01	12,273	24,543
Crook	45.66	2,932	54.34	3,489	6,421
Curry	55.81	5,107	44.19	4,044	9,151
Deschutes	51.12	19,245	48.88	18,405	37,650
Douglas	44.74	17,560	55.26	21,693	39,253
Gilliam	52.49	474	47.51	429	903
Grant	45.65	1,552	54.35	1,848	3,400
Harney	43.12	1,225	56.88	1,616	2,841
Hood River	49.73	3,356	50.27	3,393	6,749
Jackson	51.58	33,191	48.42	31,163	64,354
Jefferson	45.44	2,312	54.56	2,776	5,088
Josephine	50.04	13,672	49.96	13,648	27,320
Klamath	45.04	9,430	54.96	11,508	20,938
Lake	42.14	1,364	57.86	1,873	3,237
Lane	56.32	69,578	43.68	53,955	123,533
Lincoln	60.56	10,920	39.44	7,112	18,032
Linn	44.55	16,737	55.45	20,835	37,572
Malheur	35.75	3,032	64.25	5,448	8,480
Marion	44.80	43,284	55.20	53,330	96,614
Morrow	41.04	1,202	58.96	1,727	2,929
Multnomah	56.87	138,257	43.13	104,844	243,101
Polk	43.60	10,070	56.40	13,028	23,098
Sherman	50.52	483	49.48	473	956
Tillamook	53.20	5,298	46.80	4,660	9,958
Umatilla	42.65	7,987	57.35	10,741	18,728
Union	47.19	4,690	52.81	5,249	9,939
Wallowa	45.48	1,609	54.52	1,929	3,538
Wasco	46.70	4,281	53.30	4,887	9,168
Washington	52.25	72,268	47.75	66,047	138,315
Wheeler	39.78	290	60.22	439	729
Yamhill	44.16	12,197	55.84	15,421	27,618

Measure 51 Results by County:

County	No	Votes	Yes	Votes	Total
Baker	52.82	3,232	47.18	2,887	6,119
Benton	62.61	17,039	37.39	10,174	27,213
Clackamas	59.39	70,470	40.61	48,189	118,659
Clatsop	61.55	7,826	38.45	4,888	12,714
Columbia	60.11	9,900	39.89	6,569	16,469
Coos	60.59	13,960	39.41	9,079	23,039
Crook	55.61	3,370	44.39	2,690	6,060
Curry	65.99	5,674	34.01	2,923	8,597
Deschutes	61.43	23,475	38.57	14,737	38,212
Douglas	53.88	18,598	46.12	15,920	34,518
Gilliam	58.56	496	41.44	351	847
Grant	49.74	1,554	50.26	1,570	3,124
Harney	49.92	1,301	50.08	1,305	2,606
Hood River	57.96	3,702	42.04	2,685	6,387
Jackson	58.72	34,099	41.28	23,976	58,075
Jefferson	56.98	2,834	43.02	2,140	4,974
Josephine	57.99	14,955	42.01	10,833	25,788
Klamath	55.44	10,348	44.56	8,318	18,666
Lake	51.20	1,433	48.80	1,366	2,799
Lane	63.82	67,860	36.18	29,389	106,331
Lincoln	69.58	11,936	30.42	5,219	17,155
Linn	52.26	17,080	47.74	15,604	32,684
Malheur	42.58	3,431	57.42	4,626	8,057
Marion	54.00	47,227	46.00	40,229	87,456
Morrow	50.63	1,336	49.37	1,303	2,639
Multnomah	65.56	142,197	34.44	74.687	216,884
Polk	53.74	10,783	46.26	9,281	20,064
Sherman	60.72	507	39.28	328	835
Tillamook	64.20	6,045	35.80	3,371	9,416
Umatilla	55.57	9,669	44.43	7,730	17,399
Union	58.06	5,462	41.94	3,945	9,407
Wallowa	52.64	1,742	47.36	1,567	3,309
Wasco	56.85	4,978	43.15	3,779	8,757
Washington	59.42	76,381	40.58	52,172	128,553
Wheeler	50.36	352	49.64	347	699
Yamhill	54.45	15,023	45.55	12,568	27,591

== The law ==
Under the law, any competent adult who has been diagnosed, by a physician, with a terminal illness that will kill the patient within six months may request in writing, from his or her physician, a prescription for a lethal dose of medication for the purpose of ending the patient's life. Exercise of the option under this law is voluntary and the patient must initiate the request. Any physician, pharmacist, or other healthcare provider who has moral objections has the right to refuse to participate.

The request must be confirmed by two witnesses, at least one of whom is not related to the patient, is not entitled to any portion of the patient's estate, is not the patient's physician, and is not employed by a health care facility caring for the patient. After the request is made, another physician must examine the patient's medical records and confirm the diagnosis. The patient must be determined to be free of a mental condition impairing judgment. If the request is authorized, the patient must wait at least fifteen days and make a second oral request before the prescription may be written; since 2020, the patient's attending physician has been allowed to waive this waiting period if the patient "will, within reasonable medical judgment, die within 15 days after making the initial oral request." The patient has a right to rescind the request at any time. Should either physician have concerns about the patient's ability to make an informed decision, or feel the patient's request may be motivated by depression or coercion, the patient must be referred for a psychological evaluation.

The law protects doctors from liability for providing a lethal prescription for a terminally ill, competent adult in compliance with the statute's restrictions. Participation by physicians, pharmacists, and health care providers is voluntary. The law also specifies a patient's decision to end his or her life shall not "have an effect upon a life, health, or accident insurance or annuity policy."

== Impact ==
From the beginning of 1999 through the end of 2024, a total of 4,881 people have had prescriptions written and 3,243 patients have died from ingesting medications prescribed under the act.

The median age of the 3,243 patients who died from ingesting medication was 73; 69.2 percent of patients had malignant neoplasms (cancer). Of the 3,243, 53.1% were male (46.9% female); 45.1% had a Baccalaureate degree or higher; 45.2% were married; primary end of life concerns were loss of autonomy (90.1%), inability to make life enjoyable (89.4%), and loss of dignity (69.4%).

An independent study published in the October 2007 issue of the Journal of Medical Ethics reports there was "no evidence of heightened risk for the elderly, women, the uninsured, people with low educational status, the poor, the physically disabled or chronically ill, minors, people with psychiatric illnesses including depression, or racial or ethnic minorities, compared with background populations."

The Death with Dignity Act was the basis of the Washington Death with Dignity Act in 2008. In 2011 the documentary film How to Die in Oregon was released. It won the Grand Jury prize for documentary film at the 27th Sundance Film Festival.

According to Dignity in Dying, Lord Falconer's Assisted Dying Bill, first tabled in the House of Lords in June 2014, "draws on the experience" of the Death with Dignity Act.

== Attempts to repeal ==
In addition to arguments against physician-assisted dying, opponents feared that terminally ill people throughout the nation would flock to Oregon to take advantage of the law. This fear has not been realized, largely because drafters of the law limited its use to Oregon residents. Despite the measure's passage, implementation was tied up in the courts for several years.

In 1997, the Oregon Legislative Assembly referred Measure 51, which would have repealed the act, to the ballot.

Proponents of Measure 51 argued that the Death with Dignity Act lacked a mandatory counseling provision, a family notification provision, strong reporting requirements, or a strong residency requirement. Measure 51 opponents argued that sending the measure back to voters was disrespectful considering they had already passed Measure 16 via the initiative process. They also felt that the safeguards in the Death with Dignity Act were adequate.

Measure 51 was defeated in the November 4, 1997, special election with 445,830 votes in favor, and 666,275 votes against.

Some members of the United States Congress, notably Senator Don Nickles of Oklahoma, tried to block implementation of Measure 16, but failed.

In 2002, federal judge Robert E. Jones blocked a move by United States Attorney General John Ashcroft to suspend the license for prescribing drugs covered in the Controlled Substances Act of doctors who prescribed life-ending medications under the Oregon law. The Ninth Circuit Court of Appeals affirmed the block, stating that the "Attorney General lacked Congress' requisite authorization".

In October 2005, the U.S. Supreme Court heard arguments in the case of Gonzales v. Oregon to determine the fate of the Death with Dignity law. Arguing on behalf of the state was Oregon Senior Assistant Attorney General Robert Atkinson. Oregon's five Democratic members of Congress also filed a brief in support of the State's position. United States Solicitor General Paul Clement argued on behalf of the Bush administration, which challenged Oregon's right to regulate the practice of medicine when that practice entails prescribing federally controlled substances. On January 17, 2006, the court ruled 6–3 in favor of Oregon, upholding the law.

== See also ==
- Act 39 in Vermont, the first state to pass a death with dignity law by legislative action
- Assisted suicide in the United States
- List of Oregon ballot measures
- California End of Life Option Act
- Compassion & Choices of Oregon, providing medical consultation and direct service for persons eligible for the Oregon Death with Dignity law
- Death with Dignity, song by Sufjan Stevens
- Death with Dignity Act, disambiguation page that lists similar laws
- Death with Dignity National Center, an organization founded to pass and support the law
- Massachusetts Death with Dignity Initiative
- Washington Death with Dignity Act, a similar measure passed in November 2008 in the state of Washington
- Baxter v. Montana, a court decision legalizing aid in dying in Montana
- Gonzales v. Oregon
- Washington v. Glucksberg
- Euthanasia in Australia
- Voluntary Assisted Dying Act 2017 (Victoria)
