= National Spinal Cord Injury Association =

The National Spinal Cord Injury Association was a U.S. medical charity that stated its mission was to "is to provide active-lifestyle information, peer support and advocacy that empowers people living with spinal cord injuries and disorders (SCI/D) to achieve their highest potential." Disability.gov said the association "provides local and national training, information and resources for individuals with spinal cord injuries, their family members and professionals".

In 1984, the association opened a toll-free telephone hotline.

The Association has closed, and its membership was integrated into the United Spinal Association.
