= Death with Dignity National Center =

US advocacy group for assisted dying laws

- Formation: December 30, 1994; 31 years ago
- Type: Education, defense, and advocacy
- Tax ID no.: 93-1162366
- Legal status: 501(c)(3) nonprofit organization
- Purpose: To promote death with dignity laws based on model legislation, the Oregon Death with Dignity Act, both to provide an option for dying individuals and to stimulate nationwide improvements in end-of-life care.
- Headquarters: Portland, Oregon
- Coordinates: 45.519913°N 122.677953°W
- President, Board of Directors: George Eighmey, JD
- Executive Director: Peg Sandeen, PhD, MSW
- Revenue: $799,581 (2017)
- Expenses: $674,979 (2017)
- Endowment: $62,577 _{(2017)}
- Employees: 6 (2016)
- Volunteers: 10 (2016)
- Website: deathwithdignity.org
- Formerly called: The Oregon Death with Dignity Legal Defense and Education Center

Death with Dignity National Center is a 501(c)(3) nonpartisan nonprofit organization, headquartered in Portland, Oregon, that has led the legal defense of and education about Death with Dignity laws throughout the United States for more than 25 years. The Death with Dignity National Center helped write and defend in courts the nation's first successful assisted dying law, the Oregon Death with Dignity Act, protecting the right of persons with terminal illness to control their own death. The Death with Dignity National Center is affiliated with the Death with Dignity Political Fund, a distinct and separately incorporated 501(c)(4) organization responsible for the promotion of death with dignity legislation in other states around the U.S. where medically assisted death has become the law in 9 states and the capital: Washington, D.C., California, Colorado, Hawaii, Maine, New Jersey, New Mexico, Oregon, Vermont, and, Washington.

== Mission ==
The mission of the Death with Dignity National Center is to promote death with dignity laws based on our model legislation, the Oregon Death with Dignity Act, both to provide an option for dying individuals and to stimulate nationwide improvements in end-of-life care.

== History ==
In 1993 Oregon Right to Die, a political action committee, was founded to draft and pass Oregon's Death with Dignity ballot measure 16. The following year the Oregon Right to Die PAC (ORDPAC) campaigned successfully for the passage of Measure 16 in Oregon; 51% of Oregon voters approved the death with dignity ballot initiative, which created the Oregon Death With Dignity Act allowing those who are terminally ill to hasten death in consultation with their physician and under strict safeguards, making Oregon the first U.S. state and one of the first jurisdictions in the world to officially do so. Subsequently, the Oregon Death with Dignity Legal Defense and Education Center (ODLDEC), the forerunner to the Death with Dignity National Center, a 501(c)(3) organization, was founded to defend the voter-approved law. In 1997, Oregon Right to Die Political Action Committee successfully defeated Measure 51, an attempt to ban death with dignity in Oregon, by a margin of 60% to 40%.

In 1997, three of the organizations in the Death with Dignity Alliance—Oregon Death with Dignity, Oregon Death with Dignity Legal Defense and Education Center, and Death with Dignity National Center—merged and became Death with Dignity National Center and Oregon Death with Dignity Political Action Fund in 2004. Another alliance member, Compassion in Dying, later merged with End-of-Life Choices (formerly the Hemlock Society) and became Compassion and Choices.

In 2000, Death with Dignity National Center led the effort on Question 1, the death with dignity campaign in Maine. The measure lost by a narrow margin, 51% to 49%, with only a 6,000 vote difference statewide. In 2001 Death with Dignity National Center partnered with activists in Vermont to establish death with dignity Vermont, and in 2002 Death with Dignity National Center launched an effort in Hawaii to pass death with dignity legislation through the legislative process. In 2003 ODLDEC is renamed the Death with Dignity National Center.

From 2001 to 2006, Death with Dignity National Center defended Oregon's Death with Dignity Act against U.S. Attorney General John Ashcroft and his successor Alberto Gonzales who attempted to block DWD by authorizing federal drug agents to prosecute doctors who helped terminally ill patients die. In January 2006, the US Supreme Court ruled 6–3 in the case of Gonzales v. Oregon, that former Attorney General John Ashcroft overstepped his authority in attempting to prosecute Oregon's physicians and pharmacists.

In 2008, Death with Dignity National Center successfully led the coalition for Yes on I-1000, Washington State's death with dignity campaign, to a 58%to 42% win. Washington's Death with Dignity law went into effect in March 2009.

In 2011, Death with Dignity National Center partnered with Patient Choices Vermont to help pass Death with Dignity legislation through the legislature. Vermont Governor Shumlin signed the Vermont Patient Choice and Control at End of Life into law in 2013. In the meantime, Death with Dignity National Center established Dignity 2012 to pass death with dignity legislation in Massachusetts. The issue made it on the November ballot and was narrowly (51% to 49%) defeated.

== Organization ==
Death with Dignity National Center is a 501(c)(3) organization governed by a board of directors. Current members include:

- George Eighmey
- Carol Pratt
- Eli D. Stutsman
- Midge Levy
- Lisa Vigil Schattinger
- Deborah Ziegler
- David J. Mayo

Prominent former board members include:

- Betty Rollin
- Timothy E. Quill

== Political activism ==
Through its different organizational structures over the years, Death with Dignity National Center has played a central role in defending and upholding Oregon's Death with Dignity law, culminating in the Supreme Court case Gonzales v. Oregon.

The organization has assisted with efforts to pass death with dignity laws in other states such as Maine in 2000, Hawaii in 2002, and Massachusetts in 2012.

The most recent successful efforts led to the voter approved Washington Death with Dignity Act in 2008, the first-ever death with dignity law passed through a state legislature, in Vermont, the California End of Life Option Act in 2015, the Washington, D.C. Death with Dignity Act in 2016–2017, the Hawaii Our Care, Our Choice Act in 2018, the Maine Death with Dignity Act in 2019, and the Illinois End-of-Life Options for Terminally Ill Patients Act, also known as "Deb's Law" in 2025, which was signed by Governor J.B. Pritzker and goes into effect in late 2026.

== See also ==
- Act 39 in Vermont, the first state to pass a death with dignity law by legislative action
- California End of Life Option Act
- Oregon Death with Dignity Act
- Washington Death with Dignity Act
- Final Exit Network
