= Brittany Maynard =

American assisted suicide activist (1984–2014)

- Born: Brittany Lauren Maynard; November 19, 1984; Anaheim, California, U.S.
- Died: November 1, 2014 (aged 29); Portland, Oregon, U.S.
- Cause of death: Physician assisted suicide (Note: This is the technical cause of death (COD).); Brain tumor (Note: This is the official COD noted on Maynard's death certificate.)
- Known for: Advocate for the "Right to Die"
- Spouse: Daniel Esteban Diaz (m. 2012)

Brittany Lauren Maynard (November 19, 1984 – November 1, 2014) was an American activist with terminal cancer who decided that she would die "when the time seemed right." She was an advocate for the legalization of assisted suicide for the terminally ill.

== Biography ==
Maynard was born in Anaheim, California, on November 19, 1984. She graduated with a bachelor's degree in psychology in 2006 from the University of California, Berkeley College of Letters and Science. She received a master's degree in education from the University of California, Irvine School of Education in 2010. Interested in international travel since high school, Maynard taught at orphanages in Kathmandu, Nepal and traveled also to Vietnam, Cambodia, and other Southeast Asian countries. She also took frequent trips to Europe and engaged in activities such as trekking, mountain climbing, and bungee jumping. Following her death, Maynard's mother reflected that this risk-taking behavior was likely symptomatic of the brain tumor, which had been growing for a decade.

On January 1, 2014, she was diagnosed with grade 2 astrocytoma, a form of brain cancer, and had a partial craniotomy and a partial resection of her temporal lobe. The cancer returned in April 2014, and her diagnosis was then elevated to grade 4 astrocytoma, also known as glioblastoma, with a prognosis of six months to live.

She moved from California to Oregon to take advantage of Oregon's Death with Dignity Law, saying she had decided that "death with dignity was the best option for me and my family." She partnered with Compassion & Choices to create the Brittany Maynard Fund, which seeks to legalize assisted death in states where it is illegal. She also wrote an opinion piece for CNN titled "My Right to Death with Dignity at 29".

In a video filmed October 13, 2014, she stated that "it doesn't seem like the right time right now" but that she still intended to die at some future point, as her condition was steadily worsening. Maynard chose to die on November 1, 2014, with drugs prescribed by her doctor.

== Personal life ==
Maynard married Daniel Esteban "Dan" Diaz in September 2012, and before she received her diagnosis, they had hoped to have children. In October 2014, she stated that she had visited the Grand Canyon, which was the last thing she wanted to do on her bucket list. By her side at her death were her husband; her mother, Deborah Ziegler; and her stepfather, Gary Holmes.

== Death ==
It was reported on November 2, 2014, by People and other media sources that Maynard had died by assisted suicide on November 1, surrounded by her loved ones. In accordance with Oregon state law regarding death with dignity, a brain tumor is the official cause of death on her death certificate.

== Activism and legacy ==
In the weeks leading up to her death, Maynard was said to have become the face of the United States right-to-die debate, commanding public attention, with over 16 million unique visitors reading her story on People's website. Arthur Caplan, of New York University's Division of Medical ethics, wrote that because Maynard was "young, vivacious, attractive … and a very different kind of person" from the average patient seeking physician-assisted dying, then averaging age 71 in Oregon, she "changed the optics of the debate" and got people in her generation interested in the issue. Marcia Angell, the former editor-in-chief of the New England Journal of Medicine, wrote that Maynard was a "new face" of the assisted dying movement who had "greatly helped future patients who want the same choice." However, some terminally ill individuals publicly criticized Maynard's promotion of assisted suicide. Terminal cancer patients Kara Tippetts and Maggie Karner both sent letters to Maynard asking her to reconsider.

Three days after Maynard's death, a top Catholic church official mentioned her decision to die in the context of reiterating the Catholic Church's position on the right-to-die debate, noting that, "Suicide is not a good thing. It is a bad thing because it is saying no to life and to everything it means with respect to our mission in the world and toward those around us." The National Right to Life Committee (NRLC) asserted that from its perspective, Maynard's chosen non-profit, Compassion & Choices had "exploited the illness of Brittany Maynard to promote legalization of doctor prescribed suicide in the states." Maynard's mother defended her daughter's decision via a letter released by Compassion & Choices, stating "My twenty-nine-year-old daughter's choice to die gently rather than suffer physical and mental degradation and intense pain does not deserve to be labelled as reprehensible by strangers a continent away who do not know her or the particulars of her situation."

At the time of Maynard's death, only three states had death-with-dignity laws, with two others having court rulings protecting physicians who help patients die, and bills having been introduced in seven other states. Polls have found the American public divided on the introduction of such laws. Maynard's activism has been a strong focus of Connecticut's proposed assisted death legislation.

Maynard's family have played video testimony that she recorded for proposed legislative change in her home state of California. On September 11, 2015, California lawmakers gave final approval to Senate Bill (SB 128) End of Life Option Act. A modified version of the bill, ABx2 15, was signed into law by Governor Jerry Brown on October 5, 2015. It went into effect on June 9, 2016. On May 15, 2018, a state judge blocked this law on the grounds that it was improper to consider a right-to-die bill during a special session of the state legislature that was supposed to be focused on health care spending and access issues. The law was reinstated by a state appeals court the following month.

== See also ==
- Lecretia Seales
- Ramón Sampedro
- List of people with brain tumors
