= Dignified death =

Ethical concept about the end of life

Dignified death, death with dignity, dying with dignity or dignity in dying is an ethical concept aimed at avoiding suffering and maintaining control and autonomy in the end-of-life process. In general, it is usually treated as an extension of the concept of dignified life, in which people retain their dignity and freedom until the end of their life.

Although a dignified death can be natural and occur without any type of assistance, the concept is frequently associated with the right to die, as well as with the defense of the legalization of practices such as voluntary euthanasia, physician-assisted suicide, terminal sedation or the refusal of medical assistance. According to its defenders, the possibility of these types of practices would be what would guarantee a dignified death, keeping free decisions until the last moment and avoiding unnecessary agony.

== See also ==
- Assisted dying
- Bodily integrity
- Coup de grâce
- Death with dignity (disambiguation)
- Dignity in Dying, UK organisation
- Euthanasia
- Right to die
