= Coalition for Compassionate Care of California =

The Coalition for Compassionate Care of California (CCCC) is an interdisciplinary collaborative of thought-leaders from healthcare systems and organizations, government agencies, consumer organizations, and the general public. Through advocacy, education, and resource development, it works to ensure organizations and communities have the information, resources, and tools to expand palliative care across the continuum of care.

== History ==
The Coalition for Compassionate Care of California was founded in 1998, and is based in Sacramento. Its most notable accomplishment was spearheading the advocacy for enacting a POLST paradigm in California, in 2008.
