= Washington v. Glucksberg =

- Supreme Court of the United States

Argued January 8, 1997 Decided June 26, 1997
- Full case name: Washington, et al., Petitioners v. Harold Glucksberg, et al.
- Citations: 521 U.S. 702 (more) 117 S. Ct. 2258; 117 S. Ct. 2302; 138 L. Ed. 2d 772; 1997 U.S. LEXIS 4039; 65 U.S.L.W. 4669; 97 Cal. Daily Op. Service 5008; 97 Daily Journal DAR 8150; 11 Fla. L. Weekly Fed. S 190

Case history
- Prior: 850 F. Supp. 1454 (W.D. Wash. 1994); reversed, 49 F.3d 586 (9th Cir. 1995); reversed on rehearing en banc, 79 F.3d 790 (9th Cir. 1996); cert. granted, 518 U.S. 1057 (1996).

Holding
- The Due Process Clause does not protect the right to assistance in committing suicide.

Court membership
- Chief Justice William Rehnquist Associate Justices John P. Stevens · Sandra Day O'Connor; Antonin Scalia · Anthony Kennedy; David Souter · Clarence Thomas; Ruth Bader Ginsburg · Stephen Breyer

Case opinions
- Majority: Rehnquist, joined by O'Connor, Scalia, Kennedy, Thomas
- Concurrence: O'Connor, joined by Ginsburg, Breyer (in part)
- Concurrence: Stevens (in judgment)
- Concurrence: Souter (in judgment)
- Concurrence: Ginsburg (in judgment)
- Concurrence: Breyer (in judgment)

Washington v. Glucksberg, 521 U.S. 702 (1997), is a landmark decision of the U.S. Supreme Court, which unanimously held that a right to assisted suicide was not protected by the Due Process Clause.

== Background ==
Harold Glucksberg, a physician; four other physicians; three terminally ill patients; and the non-profit organization Compassion in Dying challenged Washington's ban against assisted suicide in the Natural Death Act of 1979. They claimed that assisted suicide was a liberty interest protected by the Due Process Clause of the Fourteenth Amendment.

On May 3, 1994, US District Court Judge Barbara Jacobs Rothstein ruled in favor of Glucksberg. On March 9, 1995, the United States Court of Appeals for the Ninth Circuit reversed, with Judge John T. Noonan Jr. joined by Diarmuid O'Scannlain. After rehearing the case en banc, the Ninth Circuit, on May 28, 1996, reversed the earlier panel and affirmed the District Court's decision in an opinion by Judge Stephen Reinhardt.

Washington Attorney General Christine Gregoire petitioned the U.S. Supreme Court for a writ of certiorari, which was granted. The case was argued before the Supreme Court on January 8, 1997. Walter E. Dellinger III, the acting Solicitor General of the United States, appeared as an amicus curiae urging reversal. The question presented was whether the protection of the Due Process Clause included a right to commit suicide and to do so with another's assistance.

== Decision ==
Chief Justice William Rehnquist wrote the majority opinion for the Supreme Court. His decision reversed the Ninth Circuit's decision that the ban on physician-assisted suicide was a violation of the Due Process Clause. The Court held that because assisted suicide is not a fundamental liberty interest, it was not protected under the Fourteenth Amendment. As previously decided in the plurality opinion of Moore v. East Cleveland, liberty interests not "deeply rooted in the nation's history" do not qualify as being a protected liberty interest. The Court found that assisted suicide had been frowned upon for centuries and that the majority of the states had similar bans on assisted suicide. Rehnquist found the English common law penalties associated with assisted suicide particularly significant. For example, at early common law the state confiscated the property of a person who committed suicide. Like Blackmun in Roe v. Wade, Rehnquist used English common law to establish American tradition as a yardstick for determining what rights were "deeply rooted in the nation's history." Rehnquist cited Roe v. Wade and Planned Parenthood v. Casey in his opinion.

The Court felt that the ban was rational in that it furthered such compelling state interests as the preservation of human life and the protection of the mentally ill and the disabled from medical malpractice and coercion. The ban further protected those moved to end their lives because of financial or psychological complications. The Court also felt that declaring physician-assisted suicide a constitutionally protected right would start down the path to voluntary and perhaps involuntary euthanasia. Justice O'Connor concurred, and Justices Souter, Ginsburg, Breyer, and Stevens each wrote opinions concurring in the judgment of the court.

== Legacy ==
In 2008, Washington voters approved 58–42% the Washington Death with Dignity Act, which established guidelines for using the services of a physician to terminate one's life.

In Obergefell v. Hodges (2015), the Court found that Glucksberg's formula that rights had to be "deeply rooted" in history was "inconsistent" with the approach the Court had used in other cases, such as Loving v. Virginia (1967) and Lawrence v. Texas (2003). However, in Dobbs v. Jackson Women's Health Organization (2022), the Court based its argument on the formula in Glucksberg.

== See also ==
- Baxter v. Montana (Mont. 2009)
- Cruzan v. Director, Missouri Department of Health (1990)
- Gonzales v. Oregon (2006)
- List of United States Supreme Court cases
- Lists of United States Supreme Court cases by volume
- List of United States Supreme Court cases, volume 521
- Right to die
- Vacco v. Quill (1997)
- Washington Initiative 1000
