= Baxter v. Montana =

Montana Supreme Court decision ruling physician-assisted dying is not illegal

Baxter, et al., v. Montana, et al.
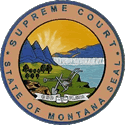
- Court: Montana Supreme Court
- Full case name: Robert Baxter, Stephen Speckart, M.D., C. Paul Loehnen, M.D., Lar Autio, M.D., George Risi Jr., M.D., and Compassion & Choices, Plaintiffs and Appellees, v. State of Montana and Steve Bullock, Defendants and Appellants
- Argued: September 2 2009
- Decided: December 31 2009
- Citation: MT DA 09-0051, 2009 MT 449

Holding
- While the State Constitution did not guarantee a right to physician-assisted suicide, there was "nothing in Montana Supreme Court precedent or Montana statutes indicating that physician aid in dying is against public policy."

Court membership
- Judges sitting: Chief Justice; Mike McGrath (recused); Associate Justices; James C. Nelson, W. William Leaphart, Patricia O. Cotter, James A. Rice, John Warner, Brian Morris; Justice Pro Tem; District Judge Joe L. Hegel (sitting in place of McGrath)

Case opinions
- Majority: Leaphart, joined by Cotter, Warner, Morris
- Dissent: Rice, joined by Hegel

Baxter v. Montana, is a Montana Supreme Court case, argued on September 2, 2009, and decided on December 31, 2009, that addressed the question of whether the state's constitution guaranteed terminally ill patients a right to lethal prescription medication from their physicians. The Montana Supreme Court sidestepped the question of whether medical aid in dying is guaranteed under Montana State Constitution, but it instead ruled, on narrower grounds, that neither legal precedent nor the state's statute deem such assistance to be against public policy or illegal. Montana is one of ten states in which aid in dying is authorized. The others are California, Colorado, Hawaii, Maine, New Jersey, New Mexico, Oregon, Vermont, and Washington; it is authorized in the District of Columbia as well.

== Background of the case ==
The original lawsuit was brought by four Montana physicians (Stephen Speckart, C. Paul Loehnen, Lar Autio, and George Risi, Jr., M.D.s), Compassion & Choices and Robert Baxter, a seventy-six-year-old truck driver from Billings, Montana, who was dying of lymphocytic leukemia. The plaintiffs asked the court to confirm a constitutional right "to receive and provide aid in dying". The state argued that "the Constitution confers no right to aid in ending one’s life." Judge Dorothy McCarter, of Montana's First Judicial District Court, ruled in favor of the plaintiffs on December 5, 2008, stating that the "constitutional rights of individual privacy and human dignity, taken together, encompass the right of a competent terminally-ill patient to die with dignity." Baxter died that same day.

The Montana Attorney General appealed the case to the state supreme court. Oral arguments were heard on September 2, 2009.

Amicus briefs filed on behalf of those asking the court to grant the constitutional right to receive/provide aid in dying include human rights groups, women's rights groups, The American Medical Women's Association/American Medical Students Association, clergy, legal scholars, thirty-one Montana state legislators and bioethicists, among others.

Among the groups filing amicus briefs on behalf of the state were the Alliance Defense Fund on behalf of the Family Research Council, Americans United for Life, the American Association of Pro-Life Obstetricians and Gynecologists, disability rights group Not Dead Yet, and the Catholic Medical Association.

The Montana Medical Association issued a statement opposing physician-assisted suicide, but refused to file an amicus brief in the appeal.

== Opinion ==
On Dec. 31, 2009, the Montana Supreme Court ruled in favor of Baxter. Although they did not address the constitutional question, they ruled on narrower grounds saying that "nothing in Montana Supreme Court precedent or Montana statutes indicating that physician aid in dying is against public policy."

== After Baxter ==
Since the Montana Supreme Court chose only to rule on statutory grounds, groups opposed to medical aid in dying have since tried to overturn the decision at the legislature. Likewise proponents of aid in dying have sought to have the detailed provisions found in other states codified.

In 2013, Montana Doctor Eric Kress, M.D. became the first physician to speak publicly about providing aid in dying for qualified patients who request the medication. In 2015, Erwin Byrnes became the first patient to speak publicly about his plans to take the medication, saying “We have to be kind of the driver of our own bus.”

In 2015, The Journal of Palliative Medicine published the article "Clinical Criteria for Physician Aid in Dying" for doctors to use as guidance in states like Montana, where provisions are not detailed in statute.

== See also ==
- California End of Life Option Act
- Compassion & Choices
- Death with Dignity National Center
