= Compassion & Choices =

U.S. nonprofit organization

- Type: Legal and legislative advocacy, counseling
- Headquarters: Portland, Oregon
- Location: United States
- Staff: 80
- Website: www.compassionandchoices.org

Compassion & Choices is a nonprofit organization in the United States working to improve patient autonomy and individual choice at the end of life, including access to medical aid in dying. Its primary function is advocating for and ensuring access to aid in dying.

== History ==
Compassion & Choices is the successor to the Hemlock Society, and the Compassion in Dying Federation; the organizations merged in 2007. The organization has a staff of 80 people located across the country.

The 2011 Sundance Film Festival Grand Jury Prize winner, How to Die in Oregon, documented the work of Compassion & Choices of Oregon.

== See also ==
- Act 39 in Vermont, the first state to pass a death with dignity law by legislative action
- Barbara Coombs Lee
- Baxter v. Montana
- California End of Life Option Act
- Oregon Death with Dignity Act
- Family Health Care Decisions Act
- Gonzales v. Oregon
- Brittany Maynard
- Vacco v. Quill
- Washington v. Glucksberg
- Washington Death with Dignity Act

== Bibliography ==
- Colt, George Howe (1991). The Enigma of Suicide. New York: Summit Books. ISBN 0671509969.
- Côté, Richard N (2008). In search of gentle death : the fight for your right to die with dignity. Mt. Pleasant, S.C.: Corinthian Books. ISBN 978-1-929175-36-9.
- Cox, Donald W. (April 1, 1993). Hemlock's Cup: The Struggle for Death With Dignity (First ed.). Prometheus Books. ISBN 978-0879758080.
- Dowbiggin, Ian (2003). A Merciful End: The Euthanasia Movement in America. Oxford England; New York, New York: Oxford University Press. ISBN 9780198035152.
- Filene, Peter G. (1998). In The Arms of Others: A Cultural History of the Right-to-Die in America. Chicago, Illinois: Ivan R. Dee. p. 196. ISBN 1-56663-188-2.
- Glick, Henry R. (1992). The Right to Die: Policy Innovation and Its Consequences. New York: Columbia University Press. ISBN 0-231-07638-X.
- Hillyard, Daniel; Dombrink, John (2001). Dying Right: The Death With Dignity Movement. New York, NY: Routledge. ISBN 978-0415927987.
- Farewell to Hemlock: Killed by its name, an essay by Derek Humphry 21 February 2005
- Humphry, Derek (2008). Good Life, Good Death - Memoir of a writer who became a euthanasia advocate. Junction City, Oregon: Norris Lane Press. ISBN 9780976828334.
- Putnam, Constance E. (2002). Hospice or Hemlock? Searching for Heroic Compassion. Westport, Connecticut: Praeger. ISBN 0897899210.
- Wanzer, Sidney, MD; Glenmullen, Joseph, MD (2007). To Die Well. Your Right to Comfort, Calm and Choices in the Last Days of Your Life. Cambridge, Massachusetts: Lifelong Books/Da Capo Press, Merloyd Lawrence Books. ISBN 978-0-7382-1083-4.
