= Gonzales v. Oregon =

- Supreme Court of the United States

Argued October 5, 2005 Decided January 17, 2006
- Full case name: Alberto R. Gonzales, Attorney General, et al., v. Oregon, et al. (Note: The case was initially filed as Oregon v. Ashcroft, with Ashcroft as a nominal defendant by virtue of his status as heading the US Department of Justice. Alberto Gonzales later replaced Ashcroft, which changed the name of the case.)
- Docket no.: 04-623
- Citations: 546 U.S. 243 (more) 126 S.Ct. 904; 163 L. Ed. 2d 748; 2006 U.S. LEXIS 767; 74 U.S.L.W. 4068; 06 Cal. Daily Op. Serv. 433; 2006 Daily Journal D.A.R. 608; 19 Fla. L. Weekly Fed. S 49
- Argument: Oral argument

Case history
- Prior: Summary judgment granted to plaintiffs in part, permanent injunction entered, sub nom. Oregon v. Ashcroft, 192 F. Supp. 2d 1077 (D. Ore. 2002); on appeal, treated as transferred, petitions for review granted, injunction continued, 368 F.3d 1118 (9th Cir. 2003); cert. granted, sub. nom. Gonzales v. Oregon, 543 U.S. 1145 (2005).

Holding
- The Controlled Substances Act does not allow the Attorney General to prohibit doctors from prescribing regulated drugs for use in physician-assisted suicide under state law that permitted the procedure. Ninth Circuit affirmed.

Court membership
- Chief Justice John Roberts Associate Justices John P. Stevens · Sandra Day O'Connor; Antonin Scalia · Anthony Kennedy; David Souter · Clarence Thomas; Ruth Bader Ginsburg · Stephen Breyer

Case opinions
- Majority: Kennedy, joined by Stevens, O'Connor, Souter, Ginsburg, Breyer
- Dissent: Scalia, joined by Roberts, Thomas
- Dissent: Thomas

Laws applied
- Ore. Rev. Stat. § 127.800 et seq. (2003) (Oregon Death With Dignity Act); 21 U.S.C. § 801 et seq. (Controlled Substances Act); 66 Fed. Reg. § 56608 (2001)

Gonzales v. Oregon, 546 U.S. 243 (2006), is a landmark decision of the US Supreme Court which ruled that the United States Attorney General cannot enforce the federal Controlled Substances Act against physicians who prescribed drugs, in compliance with Oregon state law, to terminally ill patients seeking to end their lives, commonly referred to as assisted suicide. It was the first major case heard by the Roberts Court under the new Chief Justice of the United States.

== Background ==
In November 1994, voters in the state of Oregon approved Measure 16, a ballot initiative that established the Oregon Death with Dignity Act, with 51.3% of voters supporting it and 48.7% opposing it. The Act legalized assisted suicide in the state of Oregon. The law permits physicians to prescribe a lethal dose of medication to a competent adult, agreed by two doctors to be within six months of dying from an incurable condition.

As of February 29, 2012, the Oregon Public Health Division reported that since "the law was passed in 1997, a total of 935 people have had DWDA prescriptions written and 596 patients (64% of prescriptions) have died from ingesting medications prescribed under the DWDA."

Opponents of the measure sued, and on December 27, 1994, U.S. District Judge Michael Robert Hogan issued a preliminary injunction forbidding the state from enforcing the statute, then, on August 3, 1995, declared the law unconstitutional under the Equal Protection Clause. However, after the Supreme Court of the United States rejected that reasoning in Washington v. Glucksberg (1997), the measure was allowed to take effect. A 1997 referral to voters by the Oregon Legislative Assembly aimed to repeal the Death with Dignity Act but was defeated by a 60% margin.

Members of Congress next sought to have the federal government prosecute physicians obeying the new Oregon law, and DEA Administrator Thomas A. Constantine told them that he had authority to do so under the Controlled Substances Act (CSA). However, Attorney General Janet Reno rejected that interpretation of the law and determined the federal government had no power to interfere with physicians obeying the Oregon law. Senator John Ashcroft then supported legislation explicitly granting the Attorney General that authority, but the bills failed to pass.

After Senator Ashcroft became United States Attorney General in 2001, he secured a memorandum from the Office of Legal Counsel concluding that physician-assisted suicide violates the CSA. On November 9, 2001, Attorney General Ashcroft published an "Interpretive Rule" that physician-assisted suicide was not a legitimate medical purpose and that any physician administering federally controlled drugs for that purpose would be in violation of the Controlled Substances Act.

Oregon Attorney General Hardy Myers, joined by a physician, a pharmacist, and a group of terminally ill patients, all from Oregon, filed a challenge to Attorney General Ashcroft's interpretation in the United States District Court for the District of Oregon. On April 17, 2002, U.S. District Judge Robert E. Jones granted summary judgment to Oregon and issued a permanent injunction against the enforcement of the Interpretive Rule. On May 26, 2004, that ruling was affirmed by the United States Court of Appeals for the Ninth Circuit, with Judge Richard C. Tallman joined by Senior Circuit Judge Donald P. Lay, over the dissent of Senior Circuit Judge John Clifford Wallace. The circuit panel majority invoked a clear statement rule regarding federalism in the United States to reject Attorney General Ashcroft's interpretation.

The federal government's petition for a writ for certiorari was granted and one hour of oral arguments were heard on October 5, 2005, with Paul Clement, the Solicitor General of the United States, personally appearing.

== Opinion of the Court ==
On January 17, 2006, the Court delivered judgment in favor of Oregon, affirming the lower court by a vote of 6–3. Justice Anthony Kennedy, joined by Justices John Paul Stevens, Sandra Day O'Connor, (Note: Justice O'Connor was in the majority although she had announced her retirement on July 1, 2005, pending confirmation of a successor. She remained on the Court when oral argument was heard and when the case was considered, but her vote would not have counted if her successor was seated before the Court formally announced its decision. Samuel Alito was still pending confirmation by the Senate to replace O'Connor when the ruling was handed down.) David Souter, Ruth Bader Ginsburg, and Stephen Breyer determined that the Controlled Substances Act (CSA) did not give the Attorney General the power to interfere with physicians obeying the state law. The Court did not dispute the power of the federal government to regulate drugs, but it disagreed that the statute in place empowered the attorney general to overrule state laws on the appropriate use of medications allowed.

The Court first determined it did not need to grant substantial deference to the Justice Department's interpretation of its own regulation under Auer v. Robbins (1997) because the regulation merely restated the terms of the CSA. Likewise, the Court found that, although the phrase "legitimate medical purpose" in the statute is ambiguous, the Attorney General's interpretation was not entitled to Chevron deference because the CSA delegated medical judgments to the expertise of the United States Secretary of Health and Human Services, not to the Attorney General. Finally, the Court found the Attorney General's conclusions regarding the phrase unpersuasive under Skidmore v. Swift & Co. (1944) because Congress would have been more explicit if it had intended to empower the Attorney General to unilaterally create new crimes through regulation.

== Dissents ==
=== Justice Scalia ===
Justice Antonin Scalia, joined by Chief Justice John Roberts and Justice Clarence Thomas, dissented. Scalia believed that agency deference should be given to the Attorney General under both Auer and Chevron. Even without granting any agency deference, the Attorney General's interpretation was reasonable because, Scalia argued: "If the term 'legitimate medical purpose' has any meaning, it surely excludes the prescription of drugs to produce death."

=== Justice Thomas ===
Justice Thomas also filed a brief dissent, alone. Thomas made clear that, although he still believes the CSA is not empowered by the Constitution's Interstate Commerce Clause to regulate purely intrastate conduct, if it were, the Attorney General's interpretation of the statute would be reasonable. Thomas argued that the opinion of the Court was inconsistent with the reasoning in Gonzales v. Raich (2005). He also dissented in that decision in which five of the six justices in the majority in Oregon found broad federal authority under the CSA for Congress to forbid the growth of medical marijuana.

Thomas had argued for a more limited congressional power under the Commerce Clause in Raich, which focused on intrastate and interstate commerce. In Oregon, by contrast, the case was a matter of the validity of an executive interpretation of that statute.

== See also ==
- List of United States Supreme Court cases, volume 546
- List of United States Supreme Court cases
