= 2012 Massachusetts Question 2 =

"Death with dignity" ballot initiative

Question 2
- Massachusetts "Death with Dignity" Initiative

Results
Choice	Votes	%
Yes	1,466,866	48.87%
No	1,534,757	51.13%
Valid votes	3,001,623	100.00%
Invalid or blank votes	0	0.00%
Total votes	3,001,623	100.00%

No
80–90%
70–80%
60–70%
50–60%
Yes
80–90%
70–80%
60–70%
50–60%
Other
Tie

The Massachusetts "Death with Dignity" Initiative, also known as Question 2, appeared on the November 6, 2012 general election ballot in the state of Massachusetts as an indirect initiated state statute to allow physician-assisted suicide. The measure was filed with the Massachusetts Attorney General and would establish, according to those who filed the measure, an "Act Relative to Death with Dignity". The petition number for the initiative was 11-12, and was filed by Michael Clarke as "An Initiative Petition for an Act Relative to Death with Dignity".

The proposal was to allow terminally ill patients to be given lethal drugs. A terminally ill patient would be defined as a patient being given six months or fewer to live. The patient requesting the medication must be mentally capable to make medical decisions while consulting their respective doctors. Patients would be required to submit their request orally twice and witnessed in writing, and the initial verbal request must be fifteen days prior to the written request and second oral request. The patient's terminal diagnosis and capability to make health care decisions must be confirmed by a second doctor.

The proposed measure, according to the text, requires substantial compliance with these and other requirements. The text states: "A person who substantially complies in good faith with provisions of this chapter shall be deemed to be in compliance with this chapter."

The proposed act also allows blood relatives to participate in assisting the patient to sign up for the lethal dose, providing that one of the required witnesses on the lethal dose request form not be a patient’s relative by blood, marriage or adoption. Supporters argue that the measure would give terminally ill patients dignity and control over their deaths, and would alleviate suffering. Opponents argue that the measure is morally wrong, and that beneficiaries of terminally ill patients could abuse the provisions presented by the proposal.

Voters blocked the measure by a thin margin in the November 6, 2012 general election, with 49% of voters for and 51% against.

== Text of the measure ==
=== Ballot language ===
The ballot language of the measure reads as follows:

A YES VOTE would enact the proposed law allowing a physician licensed in Massachusetts to prescribe medication, at the request of a terminally-ill patient meeting certain conditions, to end that person’s life. A NO VOTE would make no change in existing laws.

== Support ==
=== Supporters ===
- The main supporters of the measure include The Massachusetts Death with Dignity Coalition.
- The Berkshire Eagle urges its voters to vote YES on question 2.

=== Arguments ===
The following is information obtained from the supporting side of the initiative.

- According to Steve Crawford, spokesman for The Massachusetts Death with Dignity Coalition: "The act gives patients dignity, control, and peace of mind during their final days with their families and loved ones. These are very intimate personal choices that should remain in the hands of the individual not the government."
  - Crawford later stated in a newspaper interview: "This provides people with a choice to request, from their doctor, a medicine that would end their life, when other medical efforts to alleviate their pain and suffering are inadequate." Crawford also responded to Cardinal Sean P. O'Malley's comments against the initiative efforts by saying: "We certainly respect the cardinal's opinion and believe that the people of Massachusetts are ready for the discussion, about how best to provide peace, dignity, and control for terminally ill patients in their final days of life."
  - Crawford later stated about the measure, and the term "suicide" that some reports out of the state have termed it: "It's not suicide in the traditional sense of someone who suffers from depression or despair, and that's the distinction we hope to make in that language."
- Representative Louis Kafka is sponsoring a similar bill, but is not involved in the current initiative effort to place the ballot question on the ballot.
- Marcia Angell, MD, a Senior Lecturer in Social Medicine at Harvard Medical School and former Editor-in-Chief of The New England Journal of Medicine, stated in an opinion piece, "I believe it is wrong to require dying patients, against their wishes, to continue on a downhill path of suffering."
- When circulating the petitions to place the measure on the 2012 ballot, or have it enacted by state legislature, signature gatherer Randee Laikind commented: "I try to be very polite. I say, 'Would you consider signing this petition to put the Death With Dignity Act on the ballot, so Massachusetts citizens can vote on it? I've never had anyone say no. They don't even ask me questions; they just say, 'Where do I sign?'"
- Kristen Bahler, columnist at The Next Great Generation, the measure deserves to be on the ballot, "[Physician-assisted death] certainly shouldn't be considered a crime. The idea that a dying patient—stripped of mobility, strength, and, as the proposal ascertains, dignity—can choose to end his or her suffering on terms undesignated by disease is, quite simply, beautiful. And even if you disagree...Voters should make that decision. Right now, the argument isn't whether physician-assisted suicide should be made legal; it's whether Massachusetts voters should get a say in the matter. Despite efforts to the contrary, we definitely, definitely should."
- According to Tim Kutzmark, a Unitarian-Universalist minister in Reading, "I've really changed...I believe that death is a highly personal experience, and it can be excruciating and drawn out for the individual who is ill and for their families. Sometimes what is best and right for the individual is to claim that moment of death for themselves, knowing they are freeing themselves from...needless pain and suffering."

== Opposition ==
=== Opponents ===
- The main campaign against the measure is called Committee Against Physician Assisted Suicide
- Another opposition to the measure is the disability-rights group called Second Thoughts.
- Another opposition group is Mass Against Assisted Suicide.

=== Arguments ===
The following is information obtained from the opposing side of the initiative:

- A group of disability rights advocates called Second Thoughts came out in opposition to the measure. Disability activist John Kelly leads the group. According to Kelly, when commenting on the measure and Oregon, who administers "Death with Dignity": "Some people may ask why disabled people are speaking out about problems with a proposal that's supposed to be about terminal illness, but when you look at the reasons Oregon reports for giving lethal prescriptions, it's mainly about the social and emotional issues of becoming disabled, like depending on others and feeling like a burden."
- Kristian Mineau, president of the Massachusetts Family Institute, commented on potential initiative petition signers: "Literally, some people will be signing their own death warrants. It's a further erosion of the sanctity of life in our commonwealth. You talk about the slippery slope; this is going off the cliff – morally."
- According to James Driscoll, executive director of the Massachusetts Catholic Conference, "We are in support of any type of palliative care that relieves a patient's pain, but that does not promote a quicker end to life."
- Cardinal Sean P. O'Malley, leader of the Roman Catholic Archdiocese of Boston, stated at a Mass for state lawyers and jurists, without specifically referring to the initiative by name: "We are called upon to defend the gospel of life with courage and resolve. Your very profession invests in all of you a great responsibility to ensure that all laws are just."
  - O'Malley also claimed during the mass: "We hope that the citizens of the commonwealth will not be seduced by the language, 'dignity, mercy, compassion,' which are used to disguise the sheer brutality of helping someone to kill themselves."
  - Reverend J. Bryan Hehir stated about the cardinal's arguments: "The cardinal's point is that the act of suicide is always regarded as tragic...It is tragic in the sense that the act of...intentionally taking innocent human life is something that is always seen as against the good of the human person."
- Jennifer Popik, JD, of the Robert Powell Center for Medical Ethics called the measure a "threat", pointing out five points that make the measure dangerous, according to Popik. Popik stated: "While this ballot initiative poses a real threat to the people of Massachusetts, the same pro-doctor prescribed death lobby has been promoting a nearly identical measure far and wide across the nation for nearly two decades with very limited success...Once several key points about the law are considered, most states have rejected the notion that doctors ought to be able to prescribe death to patients." Read about those five points that Popik writes here.
- According to Massachusetts Against Assisted Suicide, the term "terminal patients" has also been the subject of opponents' arguments. The term, opponents say, does not necessarily mean a patient is dying. Opponents have presented a story of Oregon resident Jeanette Hall, who was diagnosed with cancer and given 6 months to a year to live. She wanted the act of assisted death to be performed, but was persuaded by her doctor to be treated instead. She is still alive 11 years later, according to opponents of the measure.
- Dr. Lynda Young, MD, stated her opposition when she said, "Physician-assisted suicide is fundamentally incompatible with the physician's role as healer. Instead of participating in assisted suicide, physicians must aggressively respond to the needs of patients at the end of life ... in order that these patients continue to receive emotional support, comfort care, adequate pain control, respect for patient autonomy and good communication."
- According to Rabbi Andrew Vogel of Temple Sinai in Brookline, "Ultimately, the moment of death is not for us to decide. That's the gift of the spiritual tradition to say it's ultimately God's choice."
- Needham Board of Health member Jane Fogg stated about the organizations opposition, "We looked really at the practical nature of the law, and came down firmly on the side that we don't see this is written in a way to prevent potential abuse."

=== Returned donation ===
The Committee Against Physician Assisted Suicide returned a $250,000 donation from a conservative Mississippi-based organization with anti-gay views in order to "keep the focus on the ballot question". The American Family Association was the largest single donor to the Committee Against Physician Assisted Suicide with the remainder coming mainly from religious organizations.

== Polls ==
- A poll that was released in early April 2012 by Public Policy Polling showed that those surveyed favored the measure 43% to 37%, with one-fifth of those polled showing they were undecided on the issue.
- A late-May poll was taken by both Western New England University and MassLive.com showing support for the measure 60% to 29%. The survey had a margin of error of +/- 4.4 percentage points and polled 504 likely voters in the state.
- On August 22, 2012, Public Policy Polling released a poll which showed support for the measure 58% to 24%. The survey had a margin of error of +/-2.9% and surveyed 1,115 likely Massachusetts voters.

== Lawsuit ==
=== John Kelly et al vs. Martha Coakley ===
On May 17, 2012, over 60 Massachusetts voters including members of the disability rights group Second Thoughts filed a challenge before the Supreme Judicial Court against the measure, challenging the wording to the measure. On June 4, 2012, the claim was denied by Justice Cordy.

According to John Kelly, director of the Second Thoughts group, and who is listed in the title of the lawsuit, "The ballot language is clearly misleading. We want the voters of Massachusetts to know exactly what they are voting on this November." The petition asks the Supreme Judicial Court to remand the language to Massachusetts Attorney General Martha Coakley and Secretary of State William Galvin with the requirement that they amend the language for clarity and accuracy.
