= Euthanasia and assisted suicide in Australia =

Legal history of euthanasia in Australia

Assisted dying legislation status in Australian states and territories (as of 2026): Voluntary euthanasia and physician-assisted suicide legal Note: Access to voluntary assisted dying in the Northern Territory is not likely to occur until early 2028.

Laws regarding euthanasia or assisted suicide in Australia are matters for state and territory governments. As of 28 August 2026 all Australian states and territories have passed laws establishing schemes that provide assisted suicide and euthanasia for eligible individuals. These laws typically refer to the practices as "voluntary assisted dying".

Voluntary assisted dying schemes have been in effect in the following states and territories; Victoria since 19 June 2019, Western Australia since 1 July 2021, Tasmania since 23 October 2022, Queensland since 1 January 2023, South Australia since 31 January 2023, New South Wales since 28 November 2023 and the Australian Capital Territory since 3 November 2025. The practice was legalised in the Northern Territory on 27 August 2026, though will not be implemented and available until early 2028.

Between 1997 and 2022 federal law prohibited the self-governing territories; Northern Territory, Australian Capital Territory and Norfolk Island, from legislating for assisted dying. This federal ban was in response to the world-first legalisation of euthanasia for a period between 1996 and 1997 in the Northern Territory.

Throughout Australia a patient can elect not to receive any treatment for a terminal illness and can also elect to have their life support turned off. Advance care planning is also available throughout Australia.

== History ==
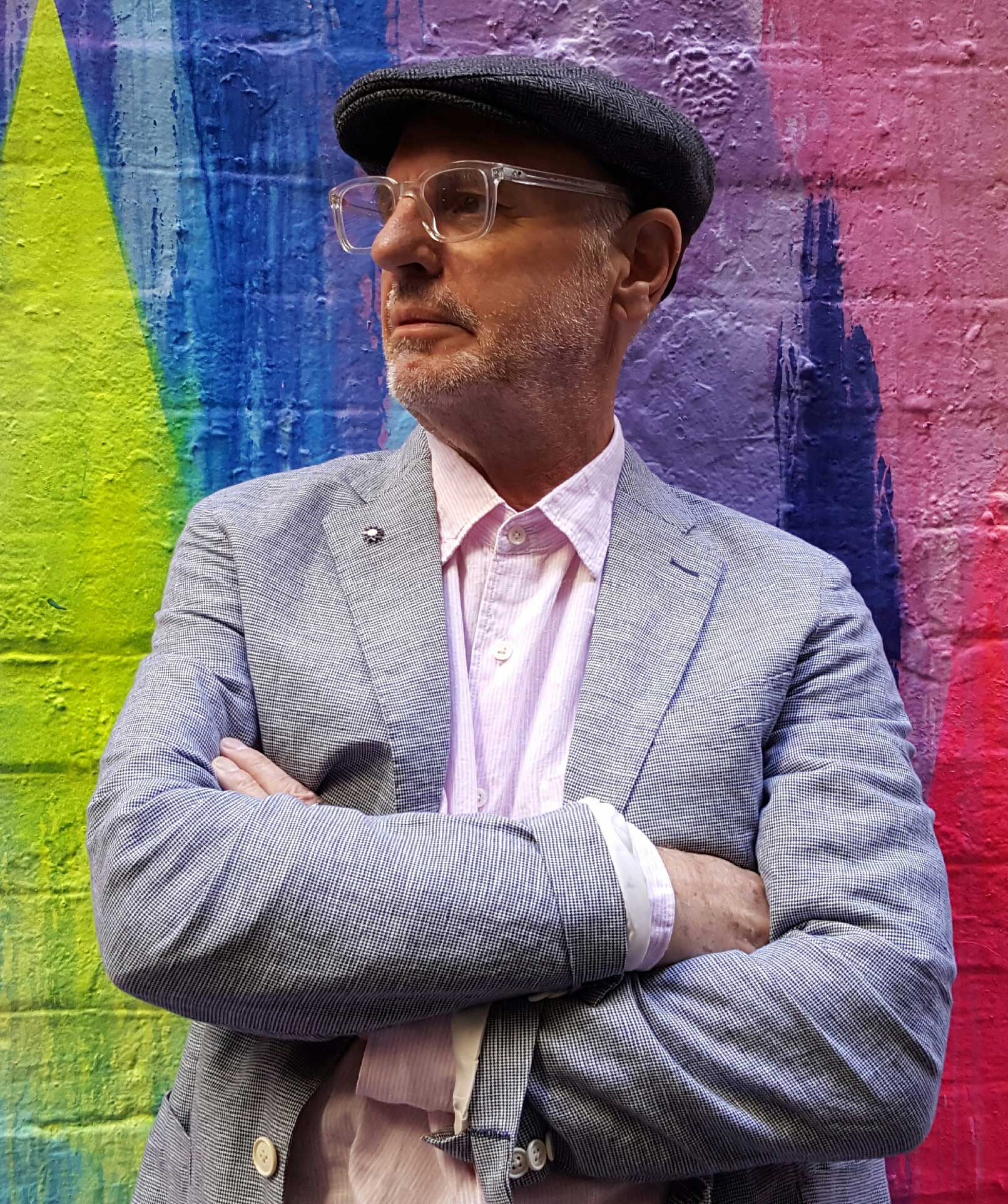
Philip Nitschke, an Australian physician and author, is a prominent international campaigner on euthanasia.

Although historically it was usually a crime to assist in euthanasia and suicide, prosecutions were rare. In 2010, the New South Wales Court of Criminal Appeal quashed a manslaughter conviction of a Sydney woman who had previously been found guilty of killing her partner of 18 years with a euthanasia drug. In 2002, relatives and friends who provided moral support to an elderly woman who committed suicide were extensively investigated by police, but no charges were laid.

In Tasmania in 2005 a nurse was convicted of assisting in the death of her elderly father, who had terminal cancer, and trying to kill her mother, who was in the early stages of dementia. She was sentenced to two and a half years in jail but the judge later suspended the conviction because he believed the community did not want the woman jailed. This sparked debate about decriminalising euthanasia.

In 2009 Shirley Justins and Caren Jennings, were found guilty of manslaughter and accessory to manslaughter respectively for providing Nembutal to former pilot Graeme Wylie in 2006. Justins stated that Wylie wanted to "die with dignity". The prosecution argued that Graeme Wylie did not have the mental capacity to make the crucial decision to end his life, classing it as involuntary euthanasia.

Exit International made TV ads arguing for voluntary euthanasia, which were banned just before they were scheduled to broadcast in September 2010. The following year the Supreme Court of New South Wales gave a two-year suspended sentence to a 66-year-old man who had facilitated the death of his long-term 78-year-old partner by helping her overdose on drugs and suffocating her. The deceased suffered from severe pain arising from a spinal condition. Furthermore, the deceased had expressed a wish to die in a suicide note written prior to her death. The court convicted the man of manslaughter. The court accounted for the accused's substantial impairment at the time the act was committed as well the fact that he voluntarily revealed his involvement in the commission of the offence.

As of November 2014, 29 bills had been presented in Australian parliaments that sought to legalise access to voluntary euthanasia or physician-assisted dying.

An omission to provide life-sustaining medical treatment is lawful in Australia, unless the patient is deemed mentally incapable of consent.

== Federal law ==
As euthanasia is not a legislative power granted to the Federal Parliament under Section 51 of the Constitution of Australia, federal law cannot explicitly legalise or criminalise the practice. The subject is a matter for state parliaments.

=== Euthanasia Laws Act 1997 ===
Despite the power to legislate for euthanasia being held by the states, under Section 122 of the Constitution of Australia the Federal Parliament has the power to override any law passed by a territory parliament. This occurred in 1997, when the Federal Parliament passed the Euthanasia Laws Act 1997, originally introduced as a private member's bill by Liberal MP Kevin Andrews. The legislation passed the Senate by 38 votes to 33 in March 1997, having previously passed the House of Representatives by 88 votes to 35 in December 1996. The law amended the Northern Territory (Self-Government) Act 1978 and Australian Capital Territory (Self-Government) Act 1988 to explicitly prevent the Northern Territory Parliament and Australian Capital Territory Legislative Assembly from legislating to allow euthanasia or assisted suicide. An identical ban was placed into the Norfolk Island Act 1979, which was later repealed as part of the abolition of self-government on Norfolk Island by the Abbott government in 2015. As well as removing the power of those territories to legalise euthanasia, the Act specifically repealed the provisions of the Rights of the Terminally Ill Act 1995 (NT), which had previously been passed by the Northern Territory Parliament and allowed euthanasia to occur in the territory in the intervening period.

Euthanasia Laws Bill 1996 – Third Reading in the House of Representatives
Party	Votes for	Votes against	Abstained/Absent
Liberal (76)	53: Tony Abbott; Neil Andrew; Kevin Andrews; Fran Bailey; Bob Baldwin; Phil Barresi; Kerry Bartlett; Bruce Billson; Bronwyn Bishop; John Bradford; Russell Broadbent; Alan Cadman; Eoin Cameron; Ross Cameron; Bob Charles; Peter Costello; Trish Draper; Kay Elson; Richard Evans; John Fahey; Teresa Gambaro; Joanna Gash; Elizabeth Grace; David Hawker; Joe Hockey; John Howard; Ricky Johnston; David Jull; David Kemp; Lou Lieberman; Peter Lindsay; Jim Lloyd; Stewart McArthur; Judi Moylan; Stephen Mutch; Brendan Nelson; Geoff Prosser; Christopher Pyne; Michael Ronaldson; Peter Slipper; Tony Smith; Warwick Smith; Alex Somlyay; Andrew Southcott; Sharman Stone; Bill Taylor; Andrew Thomson; Danna Vale; Barry Wakelin; Andrea West; Daryl Williams; Trish Worth; Paul Zammit	11: Mal Brough; Nick Dondas; Warren Entsch; Chris Gallus; Petro Georgiou; Gary Hardgrave; Susan Jeanes; Gary Nairn; Peter Nugent; Peter Reith; Wilson Tuckey	12: Bob Halverson (Speaker); Alexander Downer; Jackie Kelly; Graeme McDougall; Ian McLachlan; Chris Miles; John Moore; Philip Ruddock; Kathy Sullivan; Don Randall; Bruce Reid; Michael Wooldridge
Labor (48)	22: Dick Adams; Kim Beazley; Laurie Brereton; Janice Crosio; Martyn Evans; Joel Fitzgibbon; Ted Grace (teller); Michael Hatton; Michael Lee; Robert McClelland; Stephen Martin; Frank Mossfield; Gavan O’Connor; Roger Price; Harry Quick; Bob Sercombe; Stephen Smith; Lindsay Tanner; Andrew Theophanous; Kelvin Thomson; Greg Wilton; Leo McLeay	21: Anthony Albanese; Peter Baldwin; David Beddall; Arch Bevis; Bob Brown; Simon Crean; Annette Ellis; Gareth Evans; Laurie Ferguson; Martin Ferguson; Alan Griffin; Colin Hollis; Harry Jenkins; Duncan Kerr; Carmen Lawrence; Jenny Macklin; Bob McMullan; Allan Morris; Peter Morris; Neil O'Keefe (teller); Rod Sawford (teller)	5: Clyde Holding; Barry Jones; Mark Latham; Daryl Melham; Ralph Willis
National (18)	11: John Anderson; Larry Anthony; Ian Causley; John Forrest; Noel Hicks (teller); Peter McGauran; Paul Neville; Bruce Scott; Ian Sinclair; Warren Truss; Mark Vaile	2: Michael Cobb; Garry Nehl	5: Tim Fischer; Bob Katter; De-Anne Kelly; Paul Marek; John Sharp
Independent (5)	2: Paul Filing; Allan Rocher	1: Peter Andren	2: Pauline Hanson; Graeme Campbell
Vacant (1)	–	–	1: Fraser (by-election)
Total (148)	88	35	25

Euthanasia Laws Bill 1997 – Third Reading in the Senate
Party	Votes for	Votes against	Abstained/Absent
Liberal (29)	21: Eric Abetz; Richard Alston; Paul Calvert; Ian Campbell; Grant Chapman; Helen Coonan; Alan Eggleston; Chris Ellison; Alan Ferguson; Jeannie Ferris; Brian Gibson; Bill Heffernan; John Herron; Rod Kemp; Nick Minchin; Warwick Parer; Kay Patterson; Jim Short; John Tierney; Judith Troeth; John Watson	6: Robert Hill; Sue Knowles; Ian Macdonald; Jocelyn Newman; Margaret Reid; Amanda Vanstone	2: Winston Crane; David MacGibbon
Labor (28)	9: Mark Bishop; Jacinta Collins; Stephen Conroy; Barney Cooney; Michael Forshaw; John Hogg; Belinda Neal; Nick Sherry; Sue West	18: Nick Bolkus; Kim Carr; Bruce Childs; Bob Collins; Peter Cook; Rosemary Crowley; Kay Denman; Chris Evans; John Faulkner; Brenda Gibbs; Kate Lundy; Jim McKiernan; Sue Mackay; Shayne Murphy; Kerry O'Brien; Robert Ray; Margaret Reynolds; Chris Schacht	1: Dominic Foreman
Democrats (7)	1: John Woodley	6: Lyn Allison; Vicki Bourne; Cheryl Kernot; Meg Lees; Natasha Stott Despoja; Andrew Murray	–
National (6)	5: Ron Boswell; David Brownhill; Sandy Macdonald; Julian McGauran; Bill O’Chee	1: Grant Tambling	–
Greens (2)	–	2: Bob Brown; Dee Margetts	–
Independent (2)	2: Mal Colston; Brian Harradine	–	–
Vacant (2)	–	–	2: John Panizza (Died 31 January 1997; seat not filled); Bob Woods (Resigned 13 March 1997; seat not filled)
Total (76)	38	33	4

=== Restoring Territory Rights (Assisted Suicide Legislation) Bill 2015 ===
Over the following 20 years there were nine bills introduced to the parliament to repeal Andrews' legislation, though at no point did any repeal legislation come to a vote on the floor of either chamber of parliament. In 2018 the then Liberal Democratic Party (now called the Libertarian Party) Senator, David Leyonhjelm re-introduced a bill into the Senate to remove the federal ban on the ACT and Northern Territory legislating for euthanasia. Leyonhjelm's bill was given priority in the Senate after he secured the Turnbull government's agreement for a conscience vote in the Senate and possibly the House of Representatives (the question of the government permitting a vote in the House was unresolved), in exchange for his support to reinstate the Australian Building and Construction Commission. The Liberal/National government, opposition Labor Party and several minor party crossbenchers held a conscience vote on the legislation. Despite Leyonhjelm expressing optimism for the bill's prospects, it was defeated in the Senate by 36 votes to 34.

Restoring Territory Rights (Assisted Suicide Legislation) Bill 2015 – Second Reading in the Senate
Party	Votes for	Votes against	Absent (Note: Kimberley Kitching opposed the legislation but was absent from the chamber, so she was paired with Gavin Marshall who favoured the legislation. Lee Rhiannon favoured the legislation but resigned her seat earlier that day, so she was paired with Bridget McKenzie who opposed the legislation. Arthur Sinodinos, whose position on the bill was unknown, was absent from the chamber due to illness and Kim Carr, who favoured the bill was also absent from the chamber.)
Labor (26)	16: Catryna Bilyk; Carol Brown; Doug Cameron; Anthony Chisholm; Kristina Keneally; Sue Lines; Jenny McAllister; Malarndirri McCarthy; Claire Moore; Louise Pratt; Lisa Singh; David Smith; Glenn Sterle; Anne Urquhart (teller); Murray Watt; Penny Wong	7: Jacinta Collins; Pat Dodson; Don Farrell; Alex Gallacher; Chris Ketter (teller); Helen Polley; Deborah O'Neill	3: Kim Carr; Gavin Marshall; Kimberley Kitching
Liberal (25)	3: Simon Birmingham; Ian Macdonald; Marise Payne	21: Eric Abetz; Slade Brockman; David Bushby; Michaelia Cash; Richard Colbeck; Mathias Cormann; Jonathon Duniam; David Fawcett; Concetta Fierravanti-Wells; Mitch Fifield; Lucy Gichuhi; Jane Hume; James McGrath; Jim Molan; James Paterson; Linda Reynolds; Anne Ruston; Scott Ryan; Zed Seselja; Dean Smith; Amanda Stoker	1: Arthur Sinodinos
Greens (9)	8: Sarah Hanson-Young; Nick McKim; Richard Di Natale; Janet Rice; Rachel Siewert; Jordon Steele-John; Peter Whish-Wilson; Andrew Bartlett	–	1: Lee Rhiannon
National (6)	1: Nigel Scullion	4: Matt Canavan; Steve Martin; Barry O'Sullivan; John Williams	1: Bridget McKenzie
One Nation (2)	1: Pauline Hanson	1: Peter Georgiou	–
Centre Alliance (2)	2: Stirling Griff; Rex Patrick	–	–
Australian Conservatives (1)	–	1: Cory Bernardi	–
Katter's Australian (1)	–	1: Fraser Anning	–
Palmer United (1)	–	1: Brian Burston	–
Justice (1)	1: Derryn Hinch	–	–
Liberal Democrats (1)	1: David Leyonhjelm	–	–
Independent (1)	1: Tim Storer	–	–
Total (76)	34	36	6

=== Restoring Territory Rights Act 2022 ===
The Euthanasia Laws Act remained in effect, even as all six state parliaments passed their own versions of assisted dying legislation between 2017 and 2022. The former Morrison government rejected requests by the Australian Capital Territory (ACT) and Northern Territory governments to repeal the law. The Albanese Government, elected in May 2022, endorsed a conscience vote on repeal legislation that was introduced by Labor MPs Luke Gosling and Alicia Payne on 1 August 2022. The bill, titled the Restoring Territory Rights Bill 2022, removed the sections of the federal self-government acts for the ACT and Northern Territory that prevented those legislatures from passing euthanasia laws. It did not restore the Northern Territory's euthanasia law that was nullified by the federal parliament in 1997. Debate of the bill was prioritised by the government, and was approved by 99 votes to 37 in the House of Representatives on 3 August 2022. The bill passed its second reading in the Senate on 24 November 2022 by 41 votes to 25. It passed its third reading in the Senate on 1 December 2022, with no division called. The legislation received royal assent on 13 December 2022 and took immediate effect.

Restoring Territory Rights Bill 2022 – Third Reading in the House of Representatives
Party	Votes for	Votes against	Abstained/Absent
Labor (77)	69: Anthony Albanese; Anne Aly; Michelle Ananda-Rajah; Chris Bowen; Matt Burnell; Linda Burney; Josh Burns; Mark Butler; Alison Byrnes; Jim Chalmers; Andrew Charlton; Lisa Chesters; Jason Clare; Sharon Claydon; Libby Coker; Julie Collins; Pat Conroy; Mark Dreyfus; Justine Elliot; Mike Freelander; Carina Garland; Steve Georganas; Andrew Giles; Patrick Gorman; Luke Gosling; Julian Hill; Ed Husic; Stephen Jones; Ged Kearney; Peter Khalil; Catherine King; Madeleine King; Tania Lawrence; Jerome Laxale; Andrew Leigh; Sam Lim; Kristy McBain; Richard Marles; Zaneta Mascarenhas; Louise Miller-Frost; Brian Mitchell; Rob Mitchell; Peta Murphy; Shayne Neumann; Brendan O'Connor; Clare O'Neil; Alicia Payne; Graham Perrett; Fiona Phillips; Tanya Plibersek; Sam Rae; Gordon Reid; Daniel Repacholi; Amanda Rishworth; Tracey Roberts; Joanne Ryan; Marion Scrymgour; Bill Shorten; Sally Sitou; David Smith (teller); Anne Stanley (teller); Meryl Swanson; Susan Templeman; Matt Thistlethwaite; Kate Thwaites; Tim Watts; Anika Wells; Josh Wilson; Tony Zappia	5: Tony Burke; Cassandra Fernando; Matt Keogh; Emma McBride; Daniel Mulino (teller)	3: Milton Dick (Speaker); Michelle Rowland; Maria Vamvakinou
Liberal (42)	14: Bridget Archer; Angie Bell; Peter Dutton; Warren Entsch; Paul Fletcher; Ian Goodenough; Sussan Ley; Zoe McKenzie; Nola Marino; Gavin Pearce; Melissa Price; James Stevens; Jenny Ware; Jason Wood	21: Russell Broadbent; Scott Buchholz; Garth Hamilton; Andrew Hastie; Alex Hawke; Luke Howarth; Julian Leeser; Scott Morrison; Ted O'Brien; Tony Pasin; Henry Pike; Rowan Ramsey (teller); Stuart Robert; Michael Sukkar; Angus Taylor; Dan Tehan; Alan Tudge; Bert van Manen; Andrew Wallace; Keith Wolahan; Terry Young	7: David Coleman; Melissa McIntosh; Aaron Violi; Rick Wilson; Karen Andrews; Phillip Thompson; Ross Vasta
National (16)	5: Sam Birrell; Darren Chester; Andrew Gee; David Littleproud; Llew O'Brien	10: Colin Boyce; Pat Conaghan; Mark Coulton; David Gillespie; Kevin Hogan; Barnaby Joyce; Michael McCormack; Keith Pitt; Anne Webster; Andrew Willcox	1: Michelle Landry
Greens (4)	3: Adam Bandt; Stephen Bates; Elizabeth Watson-Brown	–	1: Max Chandler-Mather
Katter's Australian (1)	–	1: Bob Katter	–
Centre Alliance (1)	1: Rebekha Sharkie	–	–
Independent (10)	7: Zoe Daniel; Monique Ryan; Sophie Scamps; Allegra Spender; Zali Steggall; Kylea Tink; Andrew Wilkie	–	3: Kate Chaney; Helen Haines; Dai Le
Total (151)	99	37	15

Restoring Territory Rights Bill 2022 – Second Reading in the Senate
Party	Votes for	Votes against	Abstained/Absent
Labor (26)	17: Tim Ayres; Catryna Bilyk; Carol Brown; Katy Gallagher; Nita Green; Karen Grogan; Sue Lines (President); Jenny McAllister; Malarndirri McCarthy; Fatima Payman; Louise Pratt; Marielle Smith; Anne Urquhart (teller); Jess Walsh; Murray Watt; Linda White; Penny Wong	4: Anthony Chisolm; Raff Ciccone; Don Farrell; Helen Polley	5: Pat Dodson; Deborah O'Neill; Tony Sheldon; Glenn Sterle; Jana Stewart
Liberal (26)	6: Simon Birmingham; Andrew Bragg; Richard Colbeck; Jane Hume; Marise Payne; Linda Reynolds	16: Alex Antic; Wendy Askew; Slade Brockman; Michaelia Cash; Claire Chandler; Jonathon Duniam; David Fawcett; Sarah Henderson; Kerrynne Liddle; James McGrath; Andrew McLachlan; Matt O'Sullivan (teller); James Paterson; Gerard Rennick; Paul Scarr; Dean Smith	4: Hollie Hughes; Jim Molan; Anne Ruston; David Van
Greens (12)	12: Penny Allman-Payne; Dorinda Cox; Mehreen Faruqi; Sarah Hanson-Young; Nick McKim; Barbara Pocock; Janet Rice; David Shoebridge; Jordon Steele-John; Lidia Thorpe; Larissa Waters; Peter Whish-Wilson	–	–
National (6)	2: Ross Cadell; Perin Davey	4: Matt Canavan; Susan McDonald; Bridget McKenzie; Jacinta Nampijinpa Price	–
One Nation (2)	1: Pauline Hanson	1: Malcolm Roberts	–
Lambie Network (2)	2: Jacqui Lambie; Tammy Tyrrell		–
Palmer United (1)	–	–	1: Ralph Babet
Independent (1)	1: David Pocock	–	–
Total (76)	41	25	10

=== Telehealth and carriage services ===
The Howard government oversaw the passage of the Criminal Code Amendment (Suicide Related Material Offences) Act 2005, which passed the Federal Parliament in June 2005, and made it a crime to use a telephone, fax, email or internet carriage service to discuss the practicalities of suicide-related material. The law prompted the Victorian Health Minister to recommend doctors discuss voluntary assisted dying exclusively in person with their patients, so they would not run foul of the federal law. Western Australia's assisted dying law explicitly states that voluntary assisted dying is not suicide.

The presence of the federal law and its relationship with state laws that created lawful assisted dying schemes resulted in a legal grey area over whether voluntary assisted dying, as authorised by a state/territory law, constitutes ‘suicide’ within the meaning of the carriage service offences contained in the Commonwealth Criminal Code. In 2023 a Melbourne GP pursued legal action in the Federal Court to clarify the definition of suicide in the federal criminal code and its applicability to state-based assisted dying legislation. In November 2023 the court ruled that the law made it illegal for telehealth consultations concerning assisted dying to be conducted. Justice Wendy Abraham found that the term suicide, as used in the criminal code, applies to the ending of a person's life through voluntary assisted dying. The ruling prompted independent MP Kate Chaney to introduce a bill to federal parliament in February 2024, to amend the Code to make it clear that voluntary assisted dying services are not within the definition of suicide and therefore can be accessed via telehealth and carriage services according to state assisted dying laws. The bill did not proceed to a vote prior to the 2025 election. Prime Minister Anthony Albanese has previously voiced his objection to the notion of assisted dying being captured by telehealth and carriage services. In July 2026 the governing Labor Party, at its National Conference, voted to allow its members of parliament (MPs) to cast a conscience vote on telehealth consultations regarding assisted dying.

== State and territory laws ==
=== Summary of current laws ===
Jurisdiction	Name	Laws passed	Commencement date
Victoria	Voluntary Assisted Dying Act 2017	29 November 2017	19 June 2019
Western Australia	Voluntary Assisted Dying Act 2019	19 December 2019	1 July 2021
Tasmania	End-of-Life Choices (Voluntary Assisted Dying) Act 2021	4 March 2021	23 October 2022
Queensland	Voluntary Assisted Dying Act 2021	16 September 2021	1 January 2023
South Australia	Voluntary Assisted Dying Act 2021	23 June 2021	31 January 2023
New South Wales	Voluntary Assisted Dying Act 2022	19 May 2022	28 November 2023
Australian Capital Territory	Voluntary Assisted Dying Act 2024	5 June 2024	3 November 2025
Northern Territory	Rights of the Terminally Ill Act 2026	27 August 2026	Early 2028

=== Past laws ===
Jurisdiction	Name	Laws passed	Commencement date	Nullified
Northern Territory	Rights of the Terminally Ill Act 1995	25 May 1995	1 July 1996	27 June 1997

=== Australian Capital Territory ===
Australian Capital Territory (ACT) governments had regularly advocated for the right to legalise euthanasia-related schemes between 1997 and 2022, when the federal ban was in practice. Shortly after the federal ban was repealed, the ACT government confirmed it would seek to introduce legislation into the ACT Legislative Assembly in 2023 to permit voluntary assisted dying. A formal consultation period was opened by the government in February 2023, which culminated in a report endorsing the establishment of a voluntary assisted dying scheme, published on 29 June 2023. On 31 October 2023, the Voluntary Assisted Dying Bill 2023 was introduced into the Legislative Assembly. Under the legislation, a person would be eligible for voluntary assisted dying if they are aged over 18, seeking it voluntarily with decision-making capability, intolerably suffering an advanced-progressive condition expected to cause death, and lives local to the ACT for at least 12 months or with a significant Canberra connection. The bill was referred to a select committee for further consultation, which reported back on 29 February 2024. The committee recommended several alterations to the bill including clarifying terms such as ‘advanced’ and ‘last stages of life’. Liberals committee members Leanne Castley and Ed Cocks recommended that the bill not be passed, describing it as “the most ideological and extreme assisted dying legislation in the country”, while Greens member Andrew Braddock supported the bill and recommended it be expanded to include people with dementia who had lost individual decision-making capacity.

The legislation returned for debate in the Assembly and was passed by the chamber on 5 June 2024, with 20 votes in favour and five against. Under the finalised legislation, people will become eligible to begin the process of accessing the scheme if they are at least 18 years old and seeking voluntary assisted dying voluntarily with decision-making capability. Further, they will have to show that they are intolerably suffering an advanced, progressive condition expected to cause death and that they have been local to the ACT for at least 12 months, or have a significant Canberra connection. The individual then accesses a "multi-step request and assessment process", requiring independent assessment by two qualified health professionals. The scheme differs from the tenets of other state-based schemes, namely; patients do not need to have a specific time frame until they are expected to die, one of the two health practitioners who assess someone's eligibility may be a nurse practitioner, and patients who receive treatment in institutions (such as hospitals) that object to voluntary assisted dying will have a greater ability to access it than in the states. The legislation was notified on 19 June 2024 and went into effect on 3 November 2025.

Voluntary Assisted Dying Bill 2023 – Third Reading
Party	Votes for	Votes against
Labor (10)	10: Andrew Barr; Yvette Berry; Joy Burch; Tara Cheyne; Mick Gentleman; Suzanne Orr; Marisa Paterson; Michael Pettersson; Chris Steel; Rachel Stephen-Smith	–
Liberal (9)	4: Leanne Castley; Nicole Lawder; Elizabeth Lee; Mark Parton	5: Peter Cain; Ed Cocks; Jeremy Hanson; James Milligan; Elizabeth Kikkert
Greens (6)	6: Andrew Braddock; Jo Clay; Emma Davidson; Laura Nuttall; Shane Rattenbury; Rebecca Vassarotti	–
Total (25)	20	5

=== New South Wales ===
On 21 September 2017 National Party MLC Trevor Khan introduced the Voluntary Assisted Dying Bill 2017 into the New South Wales Parliament. The Bill was modelled on the Oregon Death With Dignity Act, and was developed by a cross party working group that considered 72 "substantial" submissions. The Bill contained what advocates labelled a "raft of safeguards" including a seven-person oversight board to review all assisted deaths. The upper house debated the bill throughout several sittings in November 2017, and on 16 November the bill was voted down 20 votes to 19.

In October 2021 independent MLA Alex Greenwich introduced the Voluntary Assisted Dying Bill into the lower house of the Parliament. The legislation was subjected to a cross-party conscience vote, after Premier and Liberal Party leader Dominic Perrottet indicated he would grant Liberal members a conscience vote. The legislation was passed in the Legislative Assembly on 26 November 2021 by 52 votes to 32, and proceeded to the Legislative Council. The bill passed the Legislative Council by 23 votes to 15 on 19 May 2022, with amendments attached, that were agreed to by the Assembly that same day. The legislation received royal assent on 27 May 2022, and went into effect 18 months thereafter (i.e: 28 November 2023). New South Wales was the last of the six Australian states to legislate for assisted dying.

Under the provisions of the legislation, a person may make a request for a voluntary assisted death to a specialist doctor, which is lodged with the Voluntary Assisted Dying Board. If the doctor is satisfied that the person has the capacity to make the decision and is doing so voluntarily and determines that the person meets the criteria (i.e: they have a terminal illness that will result in death within six months, or a neurodegenerative condition that will result in death within 12 months, and whose suffering is such that it creates a painful condition that cannot be tolerably relieved), they can approve the request. The same process must then be followed by a second independent doctor. The person may then make a written request declaring their intention to end their life, which must be witnessed by two people and then be submitted to the board. A final request must be made five days later and a review done by the first doctor, who can then apply to the Voluntary Assisted Dying Board to allow access to a substance to end their patient's life. The person may administer the relevant substance themselves or have a health practitioner do it.

=== Northern Territory ===
Euthanasia was legalised in Australia's Northern Territory, by the Rights of the Terminally Ill Act 1995. It passed the Northern Territory Legislative Assembly by a vote of 15 to 10. In August 1996 a repeal bill was brought before the Parliament but was defeated by 14 votes to 11. The law was later voided by the federal Euthanasia Laws Act 1997, which is a federal law that was in effect until 13 December 2022 and prevented parliaments of territories (Specifically the Northern Territory, the Australian Capital Territory and Norfolk Island) from legalising euthanasia or assisted dying. Before the federal override occurred, three people died through physician assisted suicide under the legislation, aided by Dr Philip Nitschke. The first person was a carpenter, Bob Dent, who died on 22 September 1996.

Rights of the Terminally Ill Bill 1995 – Third Reading
Party	Votes for	Votes against
Country Liberal (17)	10: Loraine Braham; Barry Coulter; Fred Finch; Daryl Manzie; Phil Mitchell; Mick Palmer; Marshall Perron; Eric Poole; Mike Reed; Rick Setter	7: Peter Adamson; Tim Baldwin; Denis Burke; Stephen Hatton; Richard Lim; Terry McCarthy (Speaker); Shane Stone
Labor (7)	4: John Bailey; Brian Ede; Maggie Hickey; Wes Lanhupuy	3: Neil Bell; Maurice Rioli; Syd Stirling
Independent (1)	1: Noel Padgham-Purich	–
Total (25)	15	10

Following the repeal of the federal ban on territory-based euthanasia legislation, the Northern Territory Labor government announced the formation of a community consultation process "for developing a framework for voluntary assisted dying", submissions for which closed in May 2024. The process culminated in the release of a report by an independent expert advisory panel, co-chaired by the Hon Vicki O’Halloran AO CVO and Duncan McConnel SC, which recommended a voluntary assisted dying scheme be established in the Northern Territory. No legislation was brought to the parliament prior to the 2024 general election, at which the incumbent Labor government committed to tabling an assisted dying bill in the next parliament and the opposition Country Liberal Party (CLP) was noncommittal on the issue.

In May 2025 the CLP government tasked the Legislative Assembly's Legal and Constitutional Affairs Committee with inquiring into the aforementioned report and a potential assisted dying scheme in the Northern Territory. The committee issued its report in September 2025, and recommended that a voluntary assisted dying scheme similar to the Australian Capital Territory's scheme be implemented. Acting Chief Minister Gerard Maley subsequently confirmed the government would draft legislation to be introduced to the Legislative Assembly at a later date.

The Rights of the Terminally Ill Bill 2026 was introduced to the parliament on 23 July 2026. The legislation allows a terminally ill person with 12 months or less to live to access voluntary assisted dying, provided they initiate an initial request for information from a relevant doctor. Though the legislation was subject to a conscience vote, it was passed with the support of most CLP government lawmakers when the bill was debated in the assembly on 27 August 2026. The legislation diverges from the recommendations of the official parliamentary inquiry report. The report recommended there be no requirement for a prognosis time frame for a person to be eligible for voluntary assisted dying, though voluntary assisted dying can only be accessed by those with 12 months or less to live as part of the laws. The report also recommended against a so-called "gag clause" that would bar doctors from initiating voluntary assisted dying discussions with patients, however, such a clause is in the bill. End-of-life law expert, Ben White, said the gag-clause risks depriving terminally ill people of choice. Attempts by lawmakers to remove the clause were defeated in conscience votes when the legislation passed the assembly. Access to voluntary assisted dying in the Northern Territory is not likely to be available until early 2028.

To be eligible to access voluntary assisted dying in the Northern Territory a person must be 18-years-old or older and have the capacity to make their own decisions about voluntary assisted dying. They must also be "suffering intolerably from a medical condition that is advanced, progressive and expected to cause death within 12 months". Two independent doctors with training on voluntary assisted dying will then assess the case and criteria, which is also overseen by a review board. Health professionals in the Northern Territory can conscientiously object to being involved in voluntary assisted dying but must give patients government-approved information about voluntary assisted dying if they ask about it. The law requires the person to have lived in the Northern Territory for at least 12 months before requesting voluntary assisted dying, with some exceptions.

=== Queensland ===
In November 2018, the Premier of Queensland, Annastacia Palaszczuk, launched an inquiry considering the possible legalisation of voluntary assisted dying in the state. The inquiry also took into account care of the aged, end of life, and palliative care.

In May 2021, Palaszczuk announced that voluntary assisted dying legislation would be introduced to the Queensland Parliament for consideration. The bill would allow euthanasia, if the patient meets the following criteria:

- Has an eligible condition that is advanced and progressive, with the potential for death within the subsequent 12 months;
- Is capable of making a decision with sound mind;
- Is acting voluntarily and without coercion;
- Is at least 18 years old; and
- Is a resident of Australia and has lived in Queensland for at least twelve months.

On 16 September 2021, the Queensland Legislative Assembly passed the Voluntary Assisted Dying Act 2021 with 61 votes in favour and 31 opposed. The legislation was subject to a conscience vote. It received royal assent on 23 September 2021 went into effect on 1 January 2023.

Voluntary Assisted Dying Bill 2021 – Third Reading
Party	Votes for	Votes against	Abstained/Absent
Labor (52)	48: Mark Bailey; Nikki Boyd; Jonty Bush; Glenn Butcher; Craig Crawford; Yvette D'Ath; Mick de Brenni; Cameron Dick; Leeanne Enoch; Di Farmer; Shannon Fentiman; Mark Furner; Julieanne Gilbert; Grace Grace; Aaron Harper; Michael Healy; Stirling Hinchliffe; Jennifer Howard; Jason Hunt; Ali King; Shane King; Brittany Lauga; Leanne Linard; Cynthia Lui; Jim Madden; James Martin; Lance McCallum; Melissa McMahon; Corrine McMillan; Steven Miles; Charis Mullen; Barry O'Rourke; Annastacia Palaszczuk; Jess Pugh; Kim Richards; Peter Russo; Mark Ryan; Bruce Saunders; Meaghan Scanlon; Robert Skelton; Tom Smith; Scott Stewart; Jimmy Sullivan; Adrian Tantari; Les Walker; Chris Whiting; Don Brown (teller); Joan Pease (teller)	3: Joe Kelly; Bart Mellish; Linus Power	1: Curtis Pitt (Speaker)
Liberal National (34)	10: Mark Boothman; Michael Crandon; Michael Hart; Dale Last; Brent Mickelberg; Steve Minnikin; Rob Molhoek; Tim Nicholls; Sam O'Connor; Ray Stevens	23: Ros Bates; Stephen Bennett; Jarrod Bleijie; Colin Boyce; Amanda Camm; David Crisafulli; Deb Frecklington; Laura Gerber; David Janetzki; Jon Krause; Ann Leahy; James Lister; Tim Mander; Jim McDonald; Lachlan Millar; Tony Perrett; Dan Purdie; Mark Robinson; Christian Rowan; Fiona Simpson; Pat Weir; Andrew Powell (teller); Trevor Watts (teller)	1: John-Paul Langbroek (Note: John-Paul Langbroek missed the vote because he was unable to enter the state of Queensland due to COVID-19 internal border closures.)
Katter's Australian (3)	–	3: Nick Dametto; Robbie Katter; Shane Knuth	–
Greens (2)	2: Michael Berkman; Amy MacMahon	–	–
One Nation (1)	–	1: Stephen Andrew	–
Independent (1)	1: Sandy Bolton	–	–
Total (93)	61	30	2

=== South Australia ===
In November 2016, the South Australian House of Assembly narrowly rejected a private member's bill which would have legalised a right to request voluntary euthanasia in circumstances where a person is in unbearable pain and suffering from a terminal illness. The bill was the first ever euthanasia bill to pass a second reading stage (27 votes to 19) though the bill was rejected during the clauses debate of the bill (23 votes all, with the Speaker's casting vote against the bill).

In late June 2021, a voluntary euthanasia bill similar to that of other states passed the Parliament of South Australia. The legislation mirrors most of the provisions of the Victorian law, though also allows private hospitals and individual practitioners to conscientiously object from participating in the scheme, provided they refer patients to a place where they can access the scheme. Residents in aged care and retirement villages can also access the scheme in their own homes or units. The Voluntary Assisted Dying Act 2021 went into effect on 31 January 2023.

Details of 2021 parliamentary votes on legalisation of assisted dying in South Australia

Voluntary Assisted Dying Bill 2021 Third Reading in the Legislative Council
Party	Votes for	Votes against
Liberal (8)	4: Jing Lee; Michelle Lensink; David Ridgway; Stephen Wade	4: Nicola Centofanti; Dennis Hood (teller); Rob Lucas; Terry Stephens
Labor (8)	6: Emily Bourke; Justin Hanson; Ian Hunter; Kyam Maher (teller); Irene Pnevmatikos; Russell Wortley	2: Tung Ngo; Clare Scriven
SA Best (2)	1: Connie Bonaros	1: Frank Pangallo
Greens (2)	2: Tammy Franks; Robert Simms	–
Advance SA (1)	1: John Darley	–
Total (22) (Note: President of the Council and independent MLC John Dawkins did not vote.)	14	7

Voluntary Assisted Dying Bill 2021 Third Reading in the House of Assembly
Party	Votes for	Votes against
Liberal (23)	15: David Basham; Vickie Chapman; Matt Cowdrey; John Gardner; Richard Harvey; Paula Luethen; Steven Marshall; Nick McBride; Stephen Patterson; David Pisoni; Carolyn Power; Rachel Sanderson; Peter Treloar; Tim Whetstone; Corey Wingard	7: Dan Cregan; Stephan Knoll; Steve Murray; Adrian Pederick (teller); David Speirs; Vincent Tarzia; Dan van Holst Pellekaan
Labor (19)	15: Zoe Bettison; Leon Bignell; Blair Boyer; Susan Close; Nat Cook; Jon Gee; Katrine Hildyard; Eddie Hughes; Peter Malinauskas; Stephen Mullighan; Lee Odenwalder; Chris Picton; Jayne Stinson; Joe Szakacs; Dana Wortley	3: Tom Koutsantonis; Andrea Michaels; Tony Piccolo
Independent (5)	3: Frances Bedford; Troy Bell; Fraser Ellis	1: Sam Duluk
Total (47) (Note: Geoff Brock (Independent) and Michael Brown (Labor) were paired and did not vote. Josh Teague (Liberal), the Speaker of the House of Assembly, did not vote.)	33	11

=== Tasmania ===
Tasmania first saw voluntary euthanasia legislation voted on in 2009 when Greens leader Nick McKim's 'Dying with Dignity' bill was voted down on 3 November 2009 by a vote of 15–7 in the House of Assembly. The vote saw all four Greens voting for the bill, six of the Liberals voting against the bill with one absent, and Labor splitting three voting for the bill and nine voted against the bill with two absent.

Tasmania came close to legalising voluntary euthanasia in November 2013, when a Greens-initiated voluntary euthanasia bill was narrowly defeated in the House of Assembly by a vote of 13–12. The bill would have allowed terminally ill Tasmanians to end their lives 10 days after making three separate requests to their doctor. Although both major parties allowed a conscience vote, all ten Liberals voted against the legislation, with Labor splitting seven in favour and three against, and all five Greens voting in favour.

In May 2017, a bill co-sponsored by former Labor Premier Lara Giddings and Greens leader Cassy O'Connor was defeated in the House of Assembly by a vote of 16–6. The bill proposed allowing people with an eligible medical condition to voluntarily end their lives using a lethal drug after being judged to be competent, and having a specialist and two independent doctors sign off on eligibility. Both major parties allowed a conscience vote with Labor splitting four in favour and three against, and the Liberals splitting one in favour and thirteen against, and all three Greens voting in favour. Nic Street became the first Tasmanian Liberal MP to vote in support of legalising voluntary euthanasia legislation.

In December 2019, independent Legislative Council member Mike Gaffney announced he would introduce a private member's bill to legalise voluntary assisted dying the following year. The End of Life Choices (Voluntary Assisted Dying) Bill was introduced to the Council on 27 August and was passed on 10 November 2020, without a formal vote being recorded. It proceeded to the Legislative Assembly, where it was passed with amendments attached on 4 March 2021 by 16 votes to 6. After the Council approved of the Assembly's amendments, the legislation received royal assent on 22 April 2021. The legislation went into effect on 23 October 2022.

Under the provisions of the legislation, in order to access the scheme a person must be at least 18 years of age, have decision-making capacity, be acting voluntarily and be suffering intolerably from a medical condition that is advanced, incurable, irreversible and will cause the person's death in the next six months, or 12 months for neurodegenerative disorders. The person must also be an Australian citizen or have resided in the country for at least three continuous years, and for at least 12 months in Tasmania immediately before making their first request. In total three separate requests must be made to access the scheme, each of which comes with progressively more stringent checks and balances.

End of Life Choices (Voluntary Assisted Dying) Bill 2021 – Third Reading in the House of Assembly
Party	Votes for	Votes against	Abstained/Absent
Liberal (13)	5: Sarah Courtney; Peter Gutwein; Roger Jaensch; Jeremy Rockliff; Nic Street	6: Elise Archer; Guy Barnett; Michael Ferguson; Jacquie Petrusma; John Tucker; Felix Ellis (teller)	2: Sue Hickey (Speaker); Mark Shelton
Labor (9)	8: Shane Broad; Jen Butler; Ella Haddad; David O'Byrne; Michelle O'Byrne; Alison Standen; Rebecca White; Anita Dow (teller)	–	1: Jennifer Houston
Greens (2)	2: Cassy O'Connor; Rosalie Woodruff	–	–
Independent (1)	1: Madeleine Ogilvie	–	–
Total (25)	16	6	3

=== Victoria ===
Since 19 June 2019, Victoria permits assisted dying. On 20 September 2017, the Voluntary Assisted Dying Bill 2017 was introduced into the Victorian Parliament by the Andrews Labor Government, permitting assisted suicide. The bill was modelled on the recommendations of an expert panel chaired by former Australian Medical Association president Professor Brian Owler. The bill passed the parliament, with amendments made in the Legislative Council, on 29 November 2017. The upper house voted in favour 22 votes to 18. The lower house voted in favour 47 votes to 37. In passing the bill, Victoria became the first state to legislate for voluntary assisted dying (VAD). The law received royal assent on 5 December 2017 and came into effect on 19 June 2019. Implementation of the legislation was an ongoing process which took approximately 18 months. Challenges identified with implementation which were by noted by the Medical Journal of Australia included restricting access to those who were eligible, while ensuring it did not unfairly prevent those who were eligible from accessing it and translating the legislation into appropriate clinical practice, as well as supporting and managing doctors with conscientious objections.

Under the provisions of the legislation, assisted suicide (otherwise referred to as voluntary assisted dying) may be available in Victoria under the following conditions:

- A person must be suffering from an incurable, advanced and progressive disease, illness or medical condition, and experiencing intolerable suffering.
- The condition must be assessed by two medical practitioners to be expected to cause death within six months (an exception exists for a person suffering from a neurodegenerative condition, where instead the condition must be expected to cause death within 12 months).
- A person must be over the age of 18 and have lived in Victoria for at least 12 months and have decision-making capacity.
- Though mental illness or disability are not grounds for access, people who meet all other criteria and who have a disability or mental illness will not be denied access to assisted dying.

Other processes and safeguards associated with the scheme are in place. In November 2025 the parliament passed legislation which expanded the eligibility timeframe for all terminal diagnoses from six to 12 months and removed the "gag clause" which forbade doctors from initiating conversations about voluntary assisted dying with patients.

Voluntary Assisted Dying Bill 2017 – Third Reading in Legislative Assembly
Party	Votes for	Votes against	Abstained/Absent
Labor (45)	38: Jacinta Allan; Daniel Andrews; Josh Bull; Ben Carroll; Christine Couzens; Lily D'Ambrosio; Steve Dimopoulos; Luke Donnellan; Paul Edbrooke; Maree Edwards; John Eren; Martin Foley; Jane Garrett; Judith Graley; Danielle Green; Bronwyn Halfpenny (teller); Jill Hennessy; Geoff Howard; Natalie Hutchins; Sonya Kilkenny; Sharon Knight; Telmo Languiller; Hong Lim; Frank McGuire; Lisa Neville; Wade Noonan; Martin Pakula; Tim Pallas; Danny Pearson; Jude Perera; Robin Scott; Ros Spence (teller); Nick Staikos; Mary-Anne Thomas; Marsha Thomson; Vicki Ward; Gabrielle Williams; Richard Wynne	6: Lizzie Blandthorn; Anthony Carbines; Marlene Kairouz; James Merlino; Tim Richardson; Natalie Suleyman	1: Colin Brooks (Speaker)
Liberal (30)	4: Roma Britnell; David Morris; Brian Paynter; Louise Staley	24: Neil Angus; Brad Battin; Gary Blackwood; Neale Burgess; Robert Clark; Martin Dixon; Christine Fyffe; Michael Gidley; Matthew Guy; David Hodgett; Andrew Katos (teller); Cindy McLeish; Michael O'Brien; John Pesutto; Richard Riordan; Dee Ryall; Ryan Smith; Tim Smith; David Southwick; Murray Thompson; Bill Tilley; Nick Wakeling; Graham Watt; Kim Wells	2: Louise Asher; Heidi Victoria
National (7)	1: Emma Kealy	6: Tim Bull; Peter Crisp (teller); Tim McCurdy; Danny O'Brien; Steph Ryan; Peter Walsh	–
Greens (2)	2: Sam Hibbins; Ellen Sandell	–	–
Independent (3)	2: Don Nardella; Suzanna Sheed	1: Russell Northe	–
Vacant (1)	–	–	1: Northcote (by-election)
Total (88)	47	37	4

Voluntary Assisted Dying Bill 2017 – Third Reading in Legislative Council
Party	Votes for	Votes against	Absent
Labor (14)	11: Philip Dalidakis; Khalil Eideh; Mark Gepp; Gavin Jennings; Shaun Leane; Cesar Melhem; Jenny Mikakos; Jaala Pulford; Harriet Shing; Jaclyn Symes; Gayle Tierney	3: Nazih Elasmar; Daniel Mulino; Adem Somyurek	–
Liberal (14)	4: Bruce Atkinson (President); Edward O'Donohue; Simon Ramsay; Mary Wooldridge	10: Georgie Crozier; Richard Dalla-Riva; David Davis; Bernie Finn (teller); Margaret Fitzherbert; Wendy Lovell; Josh Morris; Craig Ondarchie; Inga Peulich (teller); Gordon Rich-Phillips	–
National (2)	–	2: Melina Bath; Luke O'Sullivan	–
Greens (5)	5: Samantha Dunn; Colleen Hartland (teller); Sue Pennicuik; Samantha Ratnam; Nina Springle	–	–
Shooters (2)	–	2: Jeff Bourman; Daniel Young	–
Australian Conservatives (1)	–	1: Rachel Carling-Jenkins	–
Australian Sex Party (1)	1: Fiona Patten	–	–
Vote 1 Local Jobs (1)	1: James Purcell	–	–
Total (40)	22	18	0

=== Western Australia ===
In November 2018 the McGowan Government announced it would introduce an assisted dying bill early in the new year.

On 10 December 2019, the Voluntary Assisted Dying Act 2019 passed the Western Australian Parliament. The legislation had passed the Legislative Council by 24 votes to 11, having previously passed the Legislative Assembly 45 votes to 11. Under the legislation, an eligible person would have to be terminally ill with a condition that is causing intolerable suffering and is likely to cause death within six months, or 12 months for a neurodegenerative condition. The person would have to make two verbal requests and one written request, with each request signed off by two independent doctors. Self-administration of lethal medication is then permitted, though in a departure from the Victorian system, a patient can choose for a medical practitioner to administer the drug. The legislation goes into effect on a day to be fixed by proclamation, though the government has advised of an 18-month implementation period. The law went into effect on 1 July 2021.

== Organisations ==
The euthanasia advocacy group YourLastRight.com is the peak organisation nationally representing the "Dying with Dignity" associations of Queensland, New South Wales, Victoria and Tasmania, as well as the South Australian Voluntary Euthanasia Society (SAVES), the Western Australian Voluntary Euthanasia Society (WAVES) and the Northern Territory Voluntary Euthanasia Society (NTVES).

Exit International is an Australian euthanasia advocacy group founded by Philip Nitschke. Other Australian groups include Christians Supporting Choice for Voluntary Euthanasia and Doctors for Voluntary Euthanasia Choice.

Australian institutions and organisations that oppose the legalisation of euthanasia include the Australian Medical Association, HOPE, Right to Life Australia and the Australian Catholic Church. A contemporary Catholic viewpoint is available in a 2020 moral compass style document, expanding on the theme of the parable of the Good Samaritan.

Decriminalisation of euthanasia in Australia is supported by multiple political parties such as the Australian Greens, the Fusion Party, the Libertarian Party, and Reason Australia. Though it is usually a conscience vote for the major parties such as the Australian Labor Party and the Liberal/National Coalition.

== See also ==
- Health care in Australia
- Philip Nitschke
- Fiona Stewart (author)
- Oregon Death With Dignity Act
- Right to die
- California End of Life Option Act
- Voluntary Assisted Dying Act 2017 (Victoria)
- Voluntary Euthanasia Party
- Euthanasia and assisted suicide in New Zealand
- Voluntary assisted dying in Western Australia
