= Voluntary Euthanasia Party =

- Abbreviation: VEP
- Convenor: Kerry Bromson
- Founders: Corey McCann; Richard Mills; Philip Nitschke
- Founded: 1 June 2013; 12 years ago
- Dissolved: March 2021; 4 years ago
- Preceded by: Independent Voluntary Euthanasia
- Merged into: Reason Australia
- Ideology: Single-issue politics

Website
- http://vep.org.au (defunct)

The Voluntary Euthanasia Party (VEP) was a minor political party in Australia, founded in early 2013 by Corey McCann to advocate for legislative change to allow voluntary euthanasia in Australia. The party's inception was strongly supported by Dr Philip Nitschke, director of Exit International and Richard Mills, then President of Dying with Dignity NSW.

The VEP was registered as a political party from June 2013 to March 2021, and had a federal branch as well as state branches in New South Wales and Victoria. In 2019, the New South Wales branch voted to become the branch of the Reason Party in that state, while the Victorian branch voluntarily de-registered in 2020 following that state's implementation of assisted suicide laws.

== History ==
Before the party was founded and registered, a number of pro-voluntary euthanasia groups contested elections in South Australia. Doug McLaren was an 'Independent for Voluntary Euthanasia' candidate in 1997, before Nitschke led the 'Independent Voluntary Euthanasia' legislative council ticket in 2002.

'Independent Christians for Voluntary Euthanasia' both contested the 2010 election, and 'Independent Legalise Voluntary Euthanasia' ran in 2014.

The party was founded in 2013 to bring attention to the need for voluntary assisted dying law reform and to bring together advocates from the Dying with Dignity and Exit International movements. The immediate goal of the VEP was to make voluntary euthanasia a central issue at the September 2013 Federal election.

In December 2019, the VEP's NSW branch voted overwhelmingly to become the NSW branch of the Reason Party, on the grounds that being a single issue political party was a liability, and the Reason party were established supporters of voluntary euthanasia. Reason party leader Fiona Patten also stated the merger made sense for Reason as they did not have a branch in NSW, where VEP was well established. The Victorian branch was voluntarily de-registered with the Victorian Electoral Commission in July 2020. The federal party was the last to de-register, voluntarily de-registering in March 2021.

== Executive committee ==
Professor Ranjan Ray, former President of the Western Australia Voluntary Euthanasia Society, was the first convenor of the Party, and was succeeded by Kerry Bromson in October 2014. Philip Nitschke, the founder of Exit International, was the Deputy Convenor until October 2016, followed by Kym Buckley (2016–2017), and Shayne Higson (2017–2019). The Party Secretaries have been Corey McCann (2013–2015), Sandi Steep (2015–2016), David Mahoney (2016–2017), Sue Inglis (2018) and Julie Hanley (2018–2019). The Party Treasurers have been Jane Stabb (2013–2015), Justin Templer (2015–2016) and Sandi Steep (2016–2019).

== Definitions ==
There is no universally agreed definition of "voluntary euthanasia". Terms like dying with dignity, physician-assisted dying, physician-assisted suicide and voluntary assisted dying are also used. The VEP regards voluntary euthanasia as involving a request by a terminally or incurably ill person for medical assistance to end his or her life painlessly and peacefully. A doctor may administer the medication or prescribe medication that the patient self-administers.

== Election campaigns ==
The VEP participated in six Australian elections. They did not win any seats, though increased their percentage of votes at each re-contested election.

=== Federal ===
The VEP nominated seven candidates at the 2013 Australian federal election: six candidates for the Senate (two each in New South Wales, South Australia and the Australian Capital Territory); and a candidate for the House of Representatives seat of Solomon in the Northern Territory. Three of the candidates were terminally ill. The VEP received 21,854 first preference votes in the Senate (0.16% of votes), while the sole House of Representatives candidate received 597 votes.

The VEP nominated seven candidates at the 2016 Australian federal election: six candidates for the Senate (two each in New South Wales, South Australia and Victoria); and a candidate for the House of Representatives seat of Menzies in Victoria. The VEP received 23,252 first preference votes in the Senate (0.17% of votes), while the sole House of Representatives candidate received 973 votes.

The VEP did not run any candidates in the 2019 Australian federal election, rather they focused on canvassing the views of major candidates in key electorates.

=== Victorian state elections ===
The VEP fielded ten candidates in five Victorian Legislative Council regions at the 2014 Victorian state election on 29 November 2014. The lead candidate was Dr Fiona Stewart, public health sociologist and co-author of four books about end of life issues including The Peaceful Pill Handbook. The VEP received 16,772 first preference votes (0.49% of votes).

The VEP fielded sixteen candidates in eight Victorian Legislative Council regions at the 2018 Victorian state election on 24 November 2018. The VEP received 42,611 first preference votes (1.19% of votes).

=== New South Wales state elections ===
The VEP stood sixteen candidates for the New South Wales Legislative Council in the 2015 New South Wales state election on 28 March 2015. The lead candidate was Shayne Higson. Higson began advocating for voluntary assisted dying legislation after her mother died from a brain tumour in 2012. The VEP received 40,710 votes (0.94% of votes).

The VEP stood sixteen candidates for the New South Wales Legislative Council in the 2019 New South Wales state election on 23 March 2019. Shayne Higson resumed her role as lead candidate. The VEP received 46,971 votes (1.06% of votes). Higson finished in 26th place out of 364 candidates; seats were awarded to those who finished in the top 21 places.

In 2019, the New South Wales branch voted to become the branch of the Reason Party in that state, while the Victorian branch voluntarily de-registered in 2020 following that state's implementation of assisted suicide laws. In late 2022, the NSW branch of Reason changed its name to the Public Education Party. No explanation was publicly given for the name change.

== See also ==
- Euthanasia in Australia
- Freedom of choice
- Right to die
