= Voluntary assisted dying in Western Australia =

Western Australia was the second Australian state to legalise voluntary assisted dying, after Victoria. The Voluntary Assisted Dying Act 2019 was passed into law on 19 December 2019, and came into effect on 1 July 2021.

== Background ==
An earlier attempt to legalise euthanasia or voluntary assisted dying in Western Australia happened in 2010, when Greens MP Robin Chapple introduced a bill into parliament. The bill was defeated 24 votes to 11 in the Legislative Council after two days of debate.

Prominent campaigners for voluntary assisted dying or euthanasia in Western Australia include Clive Deverall and David Goodall.

Deverall was a prominent euthanasia campaigner who took his own life in March 2017, after suffering from cancer.

Goodall was a Perth-based academic who, in 2018, travelled to Switzerland to end his own life. He was injected with Nembutal, dying aged 104. He decided to end his life due to old age, rather than due to a terminal illness. Critics, including the Australian Medical Association, said that it set a dangerous precedent to end his life on the grounds of old age. Goodall had been a member of the voluntary euthanasia advocacy group Exit International for 20 years, and he spent his final year campaigning for the legalisation of voluntary euthanasia in Western Australia.

The Australian Medical Association is opposed to voluntary assisted dying, seeing it as unethical. AMA (WA) president Andrew Miller said that based on surveys it had conducted, a minority of doctors support voluntary assisted dying. During Victoria's legislative debate on voluntary assisted dying, AMA president Michael Gannon said that "doctors are not trained to kill people. It is deep within our ethics, deep within our training that that's not appropriate."

== Passage through parliament ==
In November 2018, it was announced that Malcolm McCusker, a former Governor of Western Australia, would lead an 11-member panel to write a bill for voluntary assisted dying. Among those on the panel were lawyers, doctors and the wife of Clive Deverall. This report was tabled to the Parliament of Western Australia on 27 June 2019.

The Voluntary Assisted Dying Bill 2019 was introduced to the Parliament of Western Australia on 7 August 2019 by the Minister for Health, Roger Cook.

Labor said that its members of parliament would be allowed a conscience vote.

The Legislative Council (upper house) debated the bill for almost 102 hours. Liberal Party MP Nick Goiran in particular spoke on each of the 186 clauses of the bill, causing sitting hours to be extended. The latest sitting ended at 1:00 am on a Thursday morning. This irritated leader of the upper house Sue Ellery and premier Mark McGowan, who accused Goiran of filibustering, the second time he had done so in 2019. Peter Collier, who was the leader of the opposition in the upper house, defended Goiran, saying "It's democracy at work and I'm very proud of the role of Nick Goiran", and "It's an issue of life and death and this piece of legislation deserves ruthless scrutiny, which it received." The bill had 55 amendments, 25 of which were Goiran's. There were also about 400 amendments rejected.

The bill passed the Legislative Council on 5 December 2019, 24 to 11 and the Legislative Assembly on 10 December. Royal assent was given on 19 December.

== Reactions ==
Critics said it was the most dangerous piece of euthanasia legislation enacted in Australia. Goiran said "It's verifiably the case that this is the most dangerous legislation that's ever passed", and "We know from the other jurisdictions, particularly when self-administration is involved, that there are complications, whether that be regurgitating of the substance, asphyxiating, various complications that have happened including a few stories where people actually fall into a coma and then they come out of it." He also said it was inevitable that pro-euthanasia campaigners would try to expand the law to make other types of cases eligible.

Other Members of Parliament, including Roger Cook, held back tears as the legislation passed. Premier Mark McGowan said on 10 December that it was a historic and important day for the state.

Pro-euthanasia campaigner Philip Nitschke said that Western Australia's laws were too restrictive, and they would force others like David Goodall, who are not sick but want to die for other reasons, to travel to other countries for euthanasia.

In July 2021, an unnamed terminally ill person became the first person to use the voluntary assisted dying laws to end their own life.

== Mechanism ==
The law has over 100 safeguards. To be eligible for assisted dying, a person must be above 18 years old, terminally ill, in severe pain, and likely to die within six months, or a year for neurodegenerative diseases. Two verbal requests and a written request are needed, and two different doctors independent of each other need to sign off the requests.

Self administration of the medication is the preferred method, but a medical practitioner can do it instead, unlike in Victoria, where doctors can only administer the medicine if the patient is physically unable to do it themselves.

Also unlike Victoria, there are no requirements for a specialist doctor to be involved, that patients can administer the medication themselves, and that the medication does not need to be kept in a locked box. This attracted criticism from Goiran.

The law came into effect on 1 July 2021, the 18-month gap time for health providers to prepare.

== See also ==
- Euthanasia in Australia
- Voluntary Assisted Dying Act 2017 (Victoria)
