= Euthanasia Laws Act 1997 =

Act of the Parliament of Australia

Euthanasia Laws Act 1997 (Cth)

Parliament of Australia
- Long title: An Act concerning euthanasia
- Citation: No. 17 of 1997
- Territorial extent: Territories of Australia
- Royal assent: 27 March 1997
- Commenced: 27 March 1997

Legislative history
- Introduced by: Kevin Andrews
- Passed: 24 March 1997

Related legislation
- Rights of the Terminally Ill Act 1995 (NT)
- Status: Repealed

The Euthanasia Laws Act 1997 (Cth) was an act of the Parliament of Australia to amend the Northern Territory (Self-Government) Act 1978, the Australian Capital Territory (Self-Government) Act 1988 and the Norfolk Island Act 1979 to remove the power of the territory Parliaments to legalise euthanasia. The law was enacted in response to the enactment of the Rights of the Terminally Ill Act 1995 (NT) by the Parliament of the Northern Territory which had legalised euthanasia in the Territory. The Act was repealed by the Restoring Territory Rights Act 2022, which was passed by the federal parliament in December 2022.

== Background ==
The Euthanasia Laws Bill 1996 was introduced in the Australian Parliament by Liberal Party backbencher Kevin Andrews as a private member's bill.

== The Act ==
Despite the power to legislate for euthanasia being held by the states, under Section 122 of the Constitution of Australia the Federal Parliament has the power to override any law passed by a territory parliament. This occurred in 1997, when the Federal Parliament passed the Euthanasia Laws Act 1997, originally introduced as a private member's bill by Liberal MP Kevin Andrews.

The legislation passed the Senate by 38 votes to 33 in March 1997, having previously passed the House of Representatives by 88 votes to 35 in December 1996. The law amended the Northern Territory (Self-Government) Act 1978 and Australian Capital Territory (Self-Government) Act 1988 to explicitly prevent the Northern Territory Parliament and Australian Capital Territory Legislative Assembly from legislating to allow euthanasia or assisted suicide. An identical ban was placed into the Norfolk Island Act 1979, which was later repealed as part of the abolition of self-government on Norfolk Island by the Abbott government in 2015.

As well as removing the power of those territories to legalise euthanasia, the Act specifically repealed the provisions of the Rights of the Terminally Ill Act 1995 (NT), which had previously been passed by the Northern Territory Parliament and allowed euthanasia to occur in the territory in the intervening period.

Euthanasia Laws Bill 1996 – Third Reading in the House of Representatives
Party	Votes for	Votes against	Abstained/Absent
Liberal (76)	53: Tony Abbott; Neil Andrew; Kevin Andrews; Fran Bailey; Bob Baldwin; Phil Barresi; Kerry Bartlett; Bruce Billson; Bronwyn Bishop; John Bradford; Russell Broadbent; Alan Cadman; Eoin Cameron; Ross Cameron; Bob Charles; Peter Costello; Trish Draper; Kay Elson; Richard Evans; John Fahey; Teresa Gambaro; Joanna Gash; Elizabeth Grace; David Hawker; Joe Hockey; John Howard; Ricky Johnston; David Jull; David Kemp; Lou Lieberman; Peter Lindsay; Jim Lloyd; Stewart McArthur; Judi Moylan; Stephen Mutch; Brendan Nelson; Geoff Prosser; Christopher Pyne; Michael Ronaldson; Peter Slipper; Tony Smith; Warwick Smith; Alex Somlyay; Andrew Southcott; Sharman Stone; Bill Taylor; Andrew Thomson; Danna Vale; Barry Wakelin; Andrea West; Daryl Williams; Trish Worth; Paul Zammit	11: Mal Brough; Nick Dondas; Warren Entsch; Chris Gallus; Petro Georgiou; Gary Hardgrave; Susan Jeanes; Gary Nairn; Peter Nugent; Peter Reith; Wilson Tuckey	12: Bob Halverson (Speaker); Alexander Downer; Jackie Kelly; Graeme McDougall; Ian McLachlan; Chris Miles; John Moore; Philip Ruddock; Kathy Sullivan; Don Randall; Bruce Reid; Michael Wooldridge
Labor (48)	22: Dick Adams; Kim Beazley; Laurie Brereton; Janice Crosio; Martyn Evans; Joel Fitzgibbon; Ted Grace (teller); Michael Hatton; Michael Lee; Robert McClelland; Stephen Martin; Frank Mossfield; Gavan O'Connor; Roger Price; Harry Quick; Bob Sercombe; Stephen Smith; Lindsay Tanner; Andrew Theophanous; Kelvin Thomson; Greg Wilton; Leo McLeay	21: Anthony Albanese; Peter Baldwin; David Beddall; Arch Bevis; Bob Brown; Simon Crean; Annette Ellis; Gareth Evans; Laurie Ferguson; Martin Ferguson; Alan Griffin; Colin Hollis; Harry Jenkins; Duncan Kerr; Carmen Lawrence; Jenny Macklin; Bob McMullan; Allan Morris; Peter Morris; Neil O'Keefe (teller); Rod Sawford (teller)	5: Clyde Holding; Barry Jones; Mark Latham; Daryl Melham; Ralph Willis
National (18)	11: John Anderson; Larry Anthony; Ian Causley; John Forrest; Noel Hicks (teller); Peter McGauran; Paul Neville; Bruce Scott; Ian Sinclair; Warren Truss; Mark Vaile	2: Michael Cobb; Garry Nehl	5: Tim Fischer; Bob Katter; De-Anne Kelly; Paul Marek; John Sharp
Independent (5)	2: Paul Filing; Allan Rocher	1: Peter Andren	2: Pauline Hanson; Graeme Campbell
Vacant (1)	–	–	1: Fraser (by-election)
Total (148)	88	35	25

Euthanasia Laws Bill 1997 – Third Reading in the Senate
Party	Votes for	Votes against	Abstained/Absent
Liberal (29)	21: Eric Abetz; Richard Alston; Paul Calvert; Ian Campbell; Grant Chapman; Helen Coonan; Alan Eggleston; Chris Ellison; Alan Ferguson; Jeannie Ferris; Brian Gibson; Bill Heffernan; John Herron; Rod Kemp; Nick Minchin; Warwick Parer; Kay Patterson; Jim Short; John Tierney; Judith Troeth; John Watson	6: Robert Hill; Sue Knowles; Ian Macdonald; Jocelyn Newman; Margaret Reid; Amanda Vanstone	2: Winston Crane; David MacGibbon
Labor (28)	9: Mark Bishop; Jacinta Collins; Stephen Conroy; Barney Cooney; Michael Forshaw; John Hogg; Belinda Neal; Nick Sherry; Sue West	18: Nick Bolkus; Kim Carr; Bruce Childs; Bob Collins; Peter Cook; Rosemary Crowley; Kay Denman; Chris Evans; John Faulkner; Brenda Gibbs; Kate Lundy; Jim McKiernan; Sue Mackay; Shayne Murphy; Kerry O'Brien; Robert Ray; Margaret Reynolds; Chris Schacht	1: Dominic Foreman
Democrats (7)	1: John Woodley	6: Lyn Allison; Vicki Bourne; Cheryl Kernot; Meg Lees; Natasha Stott Despoja; Andrew Murray	–
National (6)	5: Ron Boswell; David Brownhill; Sandy Macdonald; Julian McGauran; Bill O'Chee	1: Grant Tambling	–
Greens (2)	–	2: Bob Brown; Dee Margetts	–
Independent (2)	2: Mal Colston; Brian Harradine	–	–
Vacant (2)	–	–	2: John Panizza (Died 31 January 1997; seat not filled); Bob Woods (Resigned 13 March 1997; seat not filled)
Total (76)	38	33	4

== Legacy ==
Over the following 20 years there were nine bills introduced to the parliament to repeal Andrews' legislation, though at no point did any repeal legislation come to a vote on the floor of either chamber of parliament. In 2018 Liberal Democratic Party Senator David Leyonhjelm re-introduced a bill into the Senate to remove the federal ban on the ACT and Northern Territory legislating for euthanasia. Leyonhjelm's bill was given priority in the Senate after he secured the Turnbull government's agreement for a conscience vote in the Senate and possibly the House of Representatives (the question of the government permitting a vote in the House was unresolved), in exchange for his support to reinstate the Australian Building and Construction Commission. The Liberal/National government, opposition Labor Party and several minor party crossbenchers held a conscience vote on the legislation. Despite Leyonhjelm expressing optimism for the bill's prospects, it was defeated in the Senate by 36 votes to 34.

Restoring Territory Rights (Assisted Suicide Legislation) Bill 2015 – Second Reading in the Senate
Party	Votes for	Votes against	Absent (Note: Kimberley Kitching opposed the legislation but was absent from the chamber, so she was paired with Gavin Marshall who favoured the legislation. Lee Rhiannon favoured the legislation but resigned her seat earlier that day, so she was paired with Bridget McKenzie who opposed the legislation. Arthur Sinodinos, whose position on the bill was unknown, was absent from the chamber due to illness and Kim Carr, who favoured the bill was also absent from the chamber.)
Labor (26)	16: Catryna Bilyk; Carol Brown; Doug Cameron; Anthony Chisholm; Kristina Keneally; Sue Lines; Jenny McAllister; Malarndirri McCarthy; Claire Moore; Louise Pratt; Lisa Singh; David Smith; Glenn Sterle; Anne Urquhart (teller); Murray Watt; Penny Wong	7: Jacinta Collins; Pat Dodson; Don Farrell; Alex Gallacher; Chris Ketter (teller); Helen Polley; Deborah O'Neill	3: Kim Carr; Gavin Marshall; Kimberley Kitching
Liberal (25)	3: Simon Birmingham; Ian Macdonald; Marise Payne	21: Eric Abetz; Slade Brockman; David Bushby; Michaelia Cash; Richard Colbeck; Mathias Cormann; Jonathon Duniam; David Fawcett; Concetta Fierravanti-Wells; Mitch Fifield; Lucy Gichuhi; Jane Hume; James McGrath; Jim Molan; James Paterson; Linda Reynolds; Anne Ruston; Scott Ryan; Zed Seselja; Dean Smith; Amanda Stoker	1: Arthur Sinodinos
Greens (9)	8: Sarah Hanson-Young; Nick McKim; Richard Di Natale; Janet Rice; Rachel Siewert; Jordon Steele-John; Peter Whish-Wilson; Andrew Bartlett	–	1: Lee Rhiannon
National (6)	1: Nigel Scullion	4: Matt Canavan; Steve Martin; Barry O'Sullivan; John Williams	1: Bridget McKenzie
One Nation (2)	1: Pauline Hanson	1: Peter Georgiou	–
Centre Alliance (2)	2: Stirling Griff; Rex Patrick	–	–
Australian Conservatives (1)	–	1: Cory Bernardi	–
Katter's Australian (1)	–	1: Fraser Anning	–
United Australia (1)	–	1: Brian Burston	–
Justice (1)	1: Derryn Hinch	–	–
Liberal Democrats (1)	1: David Leyonhjelm	–	–
Independent (1)	1: Tim Storer	–	–
Total (76)	34	36	6

The Euthanasia Laws Act remained in effect, even as all six state parliaments passed their own versions of assisted dying legislation between 2017 and 2022. The former Morrison government rejected requests by the Australian Capital Territory (ACT) and Northern Territory governments to repeal the law. The Albanese Government, elected in May 2022, endorsed a conscience vote on repeal legislation that was introduced by Labor MPs Luke Gosling and Alicia Payne on 1 August 2022. The bill, titled the Restoring Territory Rights Bill 2022, removed the sections of the federal self-government acts for the ACT and Northern Territory that prevented those legislatures from passing euthanasia laws. It did not restore the Northern Territory's euthanasia law that was nullified by the federal parliament in 1997. Debate of the bill was prioritised by the government, and was approved by 99 votes to 37 in the House of Representatives on 3 August 2022. The bill passed its second reading in the Senate on 24 November 2022 by 41 votes to 25. It passed its third reading in the Senate on 1 December 2022, with no division called. The legislation received royal assent on 13 December 2022 and took immediate effect.

Restoring Territory Rights Bill 2022 – Third Reading in the House of Representatives
Party	Votes for	Votes against	Abstained/Absent
Labor (77)	69: Anthony Albanese; Anne Aly; Michelle Ananda-Rajah; Chris Bowen; Matt Burnell; Linda Burney; Josh Burns; Mark Butler; Alison Byrnes; Jim Chalmers; Andrew Charlton; Lisa Chesters; Jason Clare; Sharon Claydon; Libby Coker; Julie Collins; Pat Conroy; Mark Dreyfus; Justine Elliot; Mike Freelander; Carina Garland; Steve Georganas; Andrew Giles; Patrick Gorman; Luke Gosling; Julian Hill; Ed Husic; Stephen Jones; Ged Kearney; Peter Khalil; Catherine King; Madeleine King; Tania Lawrence; Jerome Laxale; Andrew Leigh; Sam Lim; Kristy McBain; Richard Marles; Zaneta Mascarenhas; Louise Miller-Frost; Brian Mitchell; Rob Mitchell; Peta Murphy; Shayne Neumann; Brendan O'Connor; Clare O'Neil; Alicia Payne; Graham Perrett; Fiona Phillips; Tanya Plibersek; Sam Rae; Gordon Reid; Daniel Repacholi; Amanda Rishworth; Tracey Roberts; Joanne Ryan; Marion Scrymgour; Bill Shorten; Sally Sitou; David Smith (teller); Anne Stanley (teller); Meryl Swanson; Susan Templeman; Matt Thistlethwaite; Kate Thwaites; Tim Watts; Anika Wells; Josh Wilson; Tony Zappia	5: Tony Burke; Cassandra Fernando; Matt Keogh; Emma McBride; Daniel Mulino (teller)	3: Milton Dick (Speaker); Michelle Rowland; Maria Vamvakinou
Liberal (42)	14: Bridget Archer; Angie Bell; Peter Dutton; Warren Entsch; Paul Fletcher; Ian Goodenough; Sussan Ley; Zoe McKenzie; Nola Marino; Gavin Pearce; Melissa Price; James Stevens; Jenny Ware; Jason Wood	21: Russell Broadbent; Scott Buchholz; Garth Hamilton; Andrew Hastie; Alex Hawke; Luke Howarth; Julian Leeser; Scott Morrison; Ted O'Brien; Tony Pasin; Henry Pike; Rowan Ramsey (teller); Stuart Robert; Michael Sukkar; Angus Taylor; Dan Tehan; Alan Tudge; Bert van Manen; Andrew Wallace; Keith Wolahan; Terry Young	7: David Coleman; Melissa McIntosh; Aaron Violi; Rick Wilson; Karen Andrews; Phillip Thompson; Ross Vasta
National (16)	5: Sam Birrell; Darren Chester; Andrew Gee; David Littleproud; Llew O'Brien	10: Colin Boyce; Pat Conaghan; Mark Coulton; David Gillespie; Kevin Hogan; Barnaby Joyce; Michael McCormack; Keith Pitt; Anne Webster; Andrew Willcox	1: Michelle Landry
Greens (4)	3: Adam Bandt; Stephen Bates; Elizabeth Watson-Brown	–	1: Max Chandler-Mather
Katter's Australian (1)	–	1: Bob Katter	–
Centre Alliance (1)	1: Rebekha Sharkie	–	–
Independent (10)	7: Zoe Daniel; Monique Ryan; Sophie Scamps; Allegra Spender; Zali Steggall; Kylea Tink; Andrew Wilkie	–	3: Kate Chaney; Helen Haines; Dai Le
Total (151)	99	37	15

Restoring Territory Rights Bill 2022 – Second Reading in the Senate
Party	Votes for	Votes against	Abstained/Absent
Labor (26)	17: Tim Ayres; Catryna Bilyk; Carol Brown; Katy Gallagher; Nita Green; Karen Grogan; Sue Lines (President); Jenny McAllister; Malarndirri McCarthy; Fatima Payman; Louise Pratt; Marielle Smith; Anne Urquhart (teller); Jess Walsh; Murray Watt; Linda White; Penny Wong	4: Anthony Chisholm; Raff Ciccone; Don Farrell; Helen Polley	5: Pat Dodson; Deborah O'Neill; Tony Sheldon; Glenn Sterle; Jana Stewart
Liberal (26)	6: Simon Birmingham; Andrew Bragg; Richard Colbeck; Jane Hume; Marise Payne; Linda Reynolds	16: Alex Antic; Wendy Askew; Slade Brockman; Michaelia Cash; Claire Chandler; Jonathon Duniam; David Fawcett; Sarah Henderson; Kerrynne Liddle; James McGrath; Andrew McLachlan; Matt O'Sullivan (teller); James Paterson; Gerard Rennick; Paul Scarr; Dean Smith	4: Hollie Hughes; Jim Molan; Anne Ruston; David Van
Greens (12)	12: Penny Allman-Payne; Dorinda Cox; Mehreen Faruqi; Sarah Hanson-Young; Nick McKim; Barbara Pocock; Janet Rice; David Shoebridge; Jordon Steele-John; Lidia Thorpe; Larissa Waters; Peter Whish-Wilson	–	–
National (6)	2: Ross Cadell; Perin Davey	4: Matt Canavan; Susan McDonald; Bridget McKenzie; Jacinta Nampijinpa Price	–
One Nation (2)	1: Pauline Hanson	1: Malcolm Roberts	–
Lambie Network (2)	2: Jacqui Lambie; Tammy Tyrrell	–	–
Palmer United (1)	–	–	1: Ralph Babet
Independent (1)	1: David Pocock	–	–
Total (76)	41	25	10
