= YourLastRight.com =

Pro-voluntary euthanasia lobbying group

YourLastRight.com Limited is an Australian national non-profit organisation which lobbies for law reform to permit voluntary euthanasia in restricted circumstances. In August 2012 the West Australian Voluntary euthanasia Society withdrew from the body claiming funding mismanagement and concern over attempts by YourLastRight CEO Neal Francis to initiate defamation proceedings against Exit International and Dr Philip Nitschke for questioning how YourlastRight was spending the Clem Jones bequest funding.

It is the peak body of Australian State and Territory dying with dignity and voluntary euthanasia societies: Dying With Dignity NSW, Dying With Dignity Queensland, Dying With Dignity Tasmania, Dying With Dignity Victoria, Northern Territory Voluntary Euthanasia Society, South Australian Voluntary Euthanasia Society and the West Australian Voluntary Euthanasia Society.

The establishment of YourLastRight.com Limited was led by Dying With Dignity Victoria President Neil Francis, resulting in foundation in mid-2010. The organisation was formally launched in October, 2010 at the World Federation of Right to Die Societies biennial global conference in Melbourne.

Mr Francis serves as Chairman and CEO of the Company and the Board comprises representatives from each member society. Marshall Perron, former Chief Minister of the Northern Territory and the first head of state anywhere in the world to have voluntary euthanasia legalised, and others, serve as special advisors.

YourLastRight.com Limited opposes the public availability of a “peaceful pill”.

== Activities ==
YourLastRight.com planned a TV commercial to communicate its launch. It approached the Australian Commercials Advice Bureau (CAD) which approves all TV commercials in Australia, with a draft TV commercial early in 2010. CAD provisionally approved the commercial. After the commercial was produced, CAD then refused classification. The Company then released the commercial on its YouTube channel.

As the peak body, YourLastRight.com provides coordination, assistance and funding for member societies, leadership for national campaigns, representation to the Federal Parliament and liaison with media and relevant professional bodies.

It is responsible for more than 100 Australians standing as ambassadors for aid-in-dying law reform.

In early 2011 YourLastRight.com published a major opinion piece in support of aid-in-dying, opposite a piece against by Associate Professor Nicholas Tonti-Filippini of the Australian John Paul II Institute, in the Australian Christian Lobby’s quarterly ViewPoint magazine, a publication that is distributed to all federal and state parliamentarians.

In March 2012, it was responsible for voting in the inaugural OurSay.org.au public campaign that resulted in the first question on voluntary euthanasia ever being put directly to a Prime Minister on the floor of the House of Representatives.

== Funding ==
YourLastRight.com is funded in part by grants from the late Clem Jones, former Lord Mayor of Brisbane, who left $5 million in his will towards the movement to legalise euthanasia.

== Controversies ==
In September 2009 YourlastRight commenced defamation action against the pro-euthanasia group Exit International and its director, Dr Philip Nitschke. CEO Neal Francis and the directors of YourlastRight claimed they had been defamed in an editorial piece written by Nitschke in the July 2012 edition of the Exit newsletter "Deliverance". The editorial had questioned the management and funding decisions of YourLastRight and had been prompted after a decision by the Clem Jones Foundation not to support a film project "35 Letters" by filmmaker Janine Hosking. Concern over the question of financial mismanagement led the West Australian Voluntary Euthanasia Society to withdraw from the YourLastRights group in September 2012.
