= Nancy Crick =

Australian suicide

Nancy Crick (1932 – 21 May 2002) was an Australian woman who committed suicide by drinking a solution of Nembutal, while surrounded by 21 voluntary euthanasia supporters and family. Nancy was supported in her decision by euthanasia activist Dr. Philip Nitschke. Nancy's death became highly politicised after her autopsy results were leaked to the media. This was because the autopsy showed that at that the time of her death, Nancy was 'cancer free' but had an inoperable bowel condition that may have been the cause of her suicide-inducing pain.

Critics of her actions seized on this fact, equating 'cancer free' with being 'well'. This was not the case for Nancy. After her cancer surgeries, Nancy found herself with extensive adhesions from the surgery. Adhesions are well known for making a patient's quality of life worse after surgery than before. Critics argue that Nancy Crick committed suicide even though, technically, she had no sign of the bowel cancer. The autopsy makes reference to extremely densely bound adhesions of her large and small bowel. Dr Nitschke said the scar tissue from previous cancer surgery had caused her suffering. "She didn't actually want to die when she had cancer. She wanted to die after she had cancer treatment," he said.

In an interview with the newspaper, 'The Australian', two months before her death, Nancy was quoted as saying: "I don't know what I've got and they don't know what I've got, but whatever it is, it's bloody well there. And they can't find it with their operations and in the end, it comes down to quality of life and I've got none of that now." Nancy Crick committed suicide after she decided that her quality of life post-'successful' cancer surgery was unacceptable to her. She said she was in "too much pain".

According to her Internet diary at nancycrick.com (now defunct), Nancy spent most of her time on the toilet. Melbourne newspaper The Age commented: "What she says she does in there is neither dignified nor pleasant. For these reasons, we can understand why she's had enough".

== Her death ==
Nancy died after drinking a 100ml solution of the drug, Nembutal. She was surrounded by twenty-one family and friends. One of the reasons why so many people were present at her death was to frustrate any prosecutor who might be tempted to lay charges against the observers for assisting with her suicide. Nancy felt strongly that she did not want to die alone. She resented the legal risk that her children might face should they have sat with her when she died. To protect them, Nancy invited supporters from the voluntary euthanasia group, Exit International, to be with her.

The support network "Nancy's Friends" was established by Exit International in 2005 in her memory. Nancy's Friends is a network of trained volunteers who provide support and friendship to people considering their end of life decisions.

Nancy is buried alongside her husband, James, in the Pimpama Uniting Church Cemetery at the Gold Coast.

The story of her death was covered extensively in Killing Me Softly: Voluntary Euthanasia and the Road to the Peaceful Pill by P. Nitschke & F Stewart, Penguin, Sydney, 2005).
