= Clive Deverall =

Australian CEO (1941–2017)

- Born: 1 August 1941; Watford, England
- Died: 11 March 2017 (aged 75); South Perth, Western Australia
- Spouse: Noreen Fynn (m. 1996)

Clive Deverall, AM, HonDLitt (Curtin), (1 August 1941 – 11 March 2017) was the CEO of the Cancer Council of Western Australia from 1977 to 2000. He was educated at Hurstpierpoint College, West Sussex, England.

== Career ==
He worked in Western Australia in the cancer control sector from 1977 to 2000. Following his retirement from Cancer Council Western Australia in 2000, he has represented consumer interests in settings that include the National Health and Medical Research Council, Medical Services Advisory Committee, the Department of Health & Ageing and Cancer Voices. In 2005 he worked with the Australian Senate, assisting in writing the report of its inquiry into cancer services in Australia.

== Honours ==
He was awarded an Honorary Doctors of Letters from the Curtin University in 2000.

He was awarded the Order of Australia on 11 June 2001 for service to community health, particularly through the promotion of cancer awareness programmes and support services of the Cancer Foundation of Western Australia.

The Clive Deverall Society was launched in 2004 by the Cancer Council Western Australia as a way of thanking the insightful people who have included a gift in their will to Cancer Council WA.

== Illness and death ==
Deverall was an advocate for legalising voluntary assisted dying. After years of living with Non-Hodgkin lymphoma and having had a number of mini-strokes, he committed suicide on the day of the Western Australian state election in March 2017.

Deverall's widow, Noreen Fynn, was on a panel that wrote voluntary assisted dying laws for the Western Australian parliament. Voluntary assisted dying was legalised in Western Australia in December 2019, and came into effect in July 2021.

== Personal life ==
An avid squash player, in 2002 Deverall won the Plate in Men's 60-64 Division 2 in Squash at the World Master's Games, held in Melbourne, Australia.
