= Rights of the Terminally Ill Act 1995 =

Law of the Northern Territory, Australia

Rights of the Terminally Ill Act 1995 (NT)

Northern Territory Legislative Assembly
- Long title: An Act to confirm the right of a terminally ill person to request assistance from a medically qualified person to voluntarily terminate his or her life in a humane manner; to allow for such assistance to be given in certain circumstances without legal impediment to the person rendering the assistance; to provide procedural protection against the possibility of abuse of the rights recognised by this Act; and for related purposes
- Citation: No. 12 of 1995
- Territorial extent: Northern Territory
- Assented to: 16 June 1995
- Commenced: 1 July 1996

Legislative history
- Introduced by: Marshall Perron
- First reading: 22 February 1995
- Second reading: 24 May 1995
- Third reading: 25 May 1995
- Passed: 25 May 1995

Repealed by
- Euthanasia Laws Act 1997 (Cth)
- Status: Void

The Rights of the Terminally Ill Act 1995 (NT) was a law legalising euthanasia in the Northern Territory of Australia, which was passed by the territory's Legislative Assembly in 1995. The Act was passed by the Northern Territory Legislative Assembly on 25 May 1995 by a vote of 15 to 10, received the Administrator's assent on 16 June 1995, and entered into force on 1 July 1996. A year later, a repeal bill was brought before the Northern Territory Parliament in August 1996, but was defeated by 14 votes to 11.

The effect of the law was nullified in 1997 by the federal Parliament of Australia which passed the Euthanasia Laws Act 1997. The Act continues on the Territory's statute books, however this was repealed in December 2022 with the passing of Restoring Territory Rights Act. Dr Philip Nitschke founded Exit International in response to the overturning of the Act.

While voluntary euthanasia had previously been condoned officially in the Netherlands and the US state of Oregon, the act was the first time that a legislative assembly passed a law explicitly legalising euthanasia.

== Provisions of Act ==
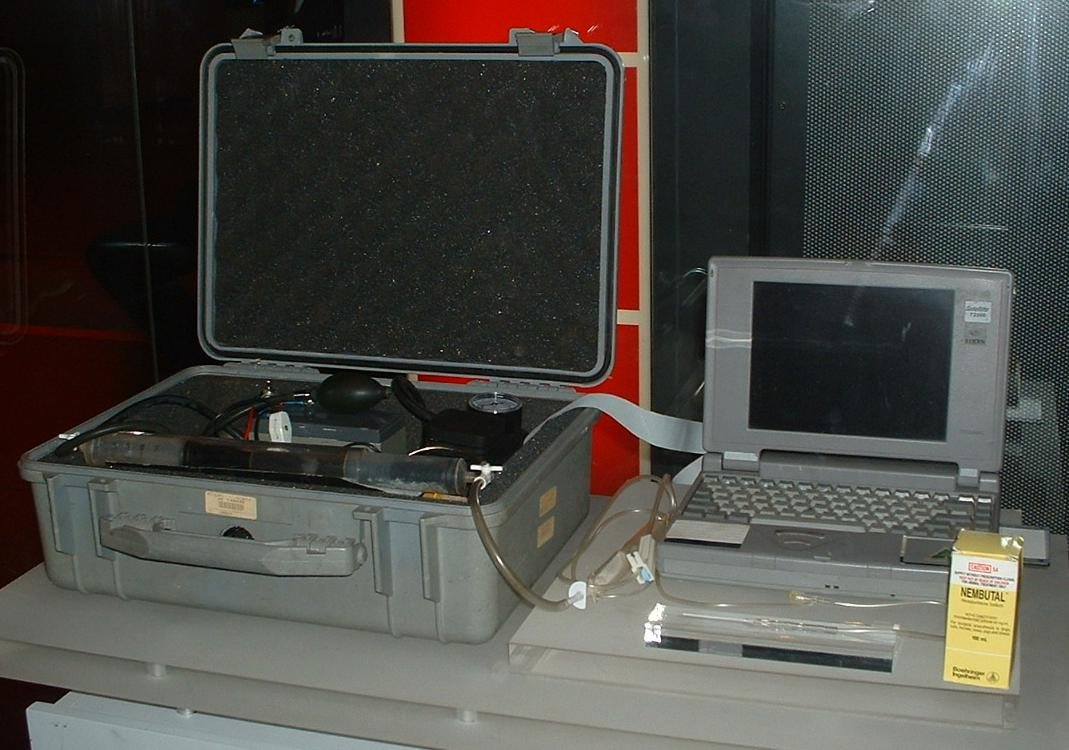
This euthanasia device was invented by Dr Philip Nitschke. Four terminally-ill Australians used it to end their lives with a lethal dose of drugs after they answered "yes" to a series of questions on the lap-top screen. This procedure was legal in Australia's Northern Territory between 1995 and 1997.

The Act allowed a terminally ill patient to end their life with medical assistance, either by the direct involvement of a physician or by procurement of drugs.

The Act set out a somewhat lengthy application process, designed to ensure that a patient was both mentally competent to make the decision and in fact terminally ill. Under the Act:

- a patient had to be over 18 and be mentally and physically competent to request their own death,
- the request had to be supported by three doctors, including a specialist who confirmed that the patient was terminally ill and a psychiatrist who certified that the patient was not suffering from treatable depression,
- once the paperwork was complete, a nine-day "cooling-off period" was required before the death could proceed.

Those who assist in the ending of a person's life under the Act were immune from prosecution or other legal consequences if acting in good faith. (Sections 16 and 20).

Euthanasia was legalised in Australia's Northern Territory, by the Rights of the Terminally Ill Act 1995. It passed the Northern Territory Legislative Assembly by a vote of 15 to 10. In August 1996 a repeal bill was brought before the Parliament but was defeated by 14 votes to 11. The law was later voided by the federal Euthanasia Laws Act 1997, which is a federal law that was in effect until 13 December 2022 and prevented parliaments of territories (Specifically the Northern Territory, the Australian Capital Territory and Norfolk Island) from legalising euthanasia or assisted dying. Before the federal override occurred, three people died through physician assisted suicide under the legislation, aided by Dr Philip Nitschke. The first person was a carpenter, Bob Dent, who died on 22 September 1996.

Rights of the Terminally Ill Bill 1995 – Third Reading
Party	Votes for	Votes against
Country Liberal (17)	10: Loraine Braham; Barry Coulter; Fred Finch; Daryl Manzie; Phil Mitchell; Mick Palmer; Marshall Perron; Eric Poole; Mike Reed; Rick Setter	7: Peter Adamson; Tim Baldwin; Denis Burke; Stephen Hatton; Richard Lim; Terry McCarthy (Speaker); Shane Stone
Labor (7)	4: John Bailey; Brian Ede; Maggie Hickey; Wes Lanhupuy	3: Neil Bell; Maurice Rioli; Syd Stirling
Independent (1)	1: Noel Padgham-Purich	–
Total (25)	15	10

== Reaction to Act ==
The passage of the Bill—one of the first of its kind in the world—provoked a furor in Australia, and indeed in much of the rest of the world. The Act received both widespread support from "death with dignity" and right to die groups who saw it as a model to be followed elsewhere, and widespread condemnation from euthanasia opponents, such as right to life groups, who sought to overturn it.

Opponents also included the Australian Medical Association, and the Bishop of Darwin, Edmund John Patrick Collins.

== Use of Act ==
While the law was in effect, four people undertook euthanasia through its provisions.

The first was carpenter Bob Dent, 66, who died on 22 September 1996. Dent was a prostate cancer sufferer who became Australia's first person to lawfully end his life by means of physician assisted suicide. Dent, who had been suffering from prostate cancer for five years in what he called "a rollercoaster of pain", left an open letter when he died that stated: "If I were to keep a pet animal in the same condition I am in, I would be prosecuted. If you disagree with voluntary euthanasia, then don't use it, but don't deny the right to me to use it." He died with the help of Dr Philip Nitschke.

The law applied to non-residents of the Northern Territory as well, and one non-resident did take advantage of the law. A resident of South Australia, Janet Mills, 52, came to Darwin in December 1996. She had suffered for some 10 years from a rare disease known as mycosis fungoides. She used Nitschke's device to take her life on 2 January 1997.

In addition, an anonymous 69-year-old male cancer patient used the law and Nitschke's device to die on 22 January 1997. A further two people had received approval to use the law when the law was nullified; a proposed amendment to the Voluntary Euthanasia Laws Bill allowing them to proceed did not pass.

== Overturning of the Act ==
While some people in the Northern Territory were unhappy with the Act and campaigned for its repeal, the Northern Territory legislature was unwavering in its support. Views in the rest of Australia were much less supportive, however, and opponents began demanding that the federal parliament overturn the law, which it had the power to do since the Northern Territory does not have the same standing in Australian jurisprudence as the states. The federal parliament could not have overturned an identical state law, since the states are sovereign entities possessing legislative power in their own right. However, self-governing territories like the Northern Territory derive their power by way of a grant from the federal parliament. Consequently, the federal parliament retains the right to legislate for the territory, including the right to territory laws. In practice, it very rarely exercised that right.

On 25 March 1997, the federal parliament passed the Euthanasia Laws Act 1997, which, although not technically repealing the Rights of the Terminally Ill Act, for all practical purposes rendered it of no legal effect. Rather than repeal the Act directly, the law instead amended the Northern Territory (Self-Government) Act 1978, the act under which the Commonwealth Parliament has delegated legislative power to the Northern Territory Parliament—effectively the territory's "constitution" or "charter"—removing the Territory's constitutional power to pass any law permitting euthanasia. The Act technically remains in force in the Territory, but has been essentially made null and void and has no legal effect.

Although passed as a reaction to the situation in the Northern Territory, the Euthanasia Laws Act 1997 made similar amendments with respect to Australia's two other self-governing territories, the Australian Capital Territory and Norfolk Island, also preventing them from passing a law permitting euthanasia. The Euthanasia Laws Act 1997 has no effect on the power of an Australian state to pass any law permitting euthanasia.

=== Current status ===
Following the passage of the Euthanasia Laws Act 1997, several attempts were made to repeal the Act in the federal Parliament. On 1 December 2022, the Restoring Territory Rights Act 2022 was passed, repealing the 1997 Act and returning power to the parliament of the Northern Territory and other self-governing territories to legislate euthanasia laws. In September 2023, Northern Territory chief minister Natasha Fyles formed a panel to take public inquiries regarding euthanasia laws. The panel reported its findings in July 2024.

== See also ==
- Euthanasia device
