= Voluntary Assisted Dying Act 2017 =

Act of Parliament of Victoria, Australia

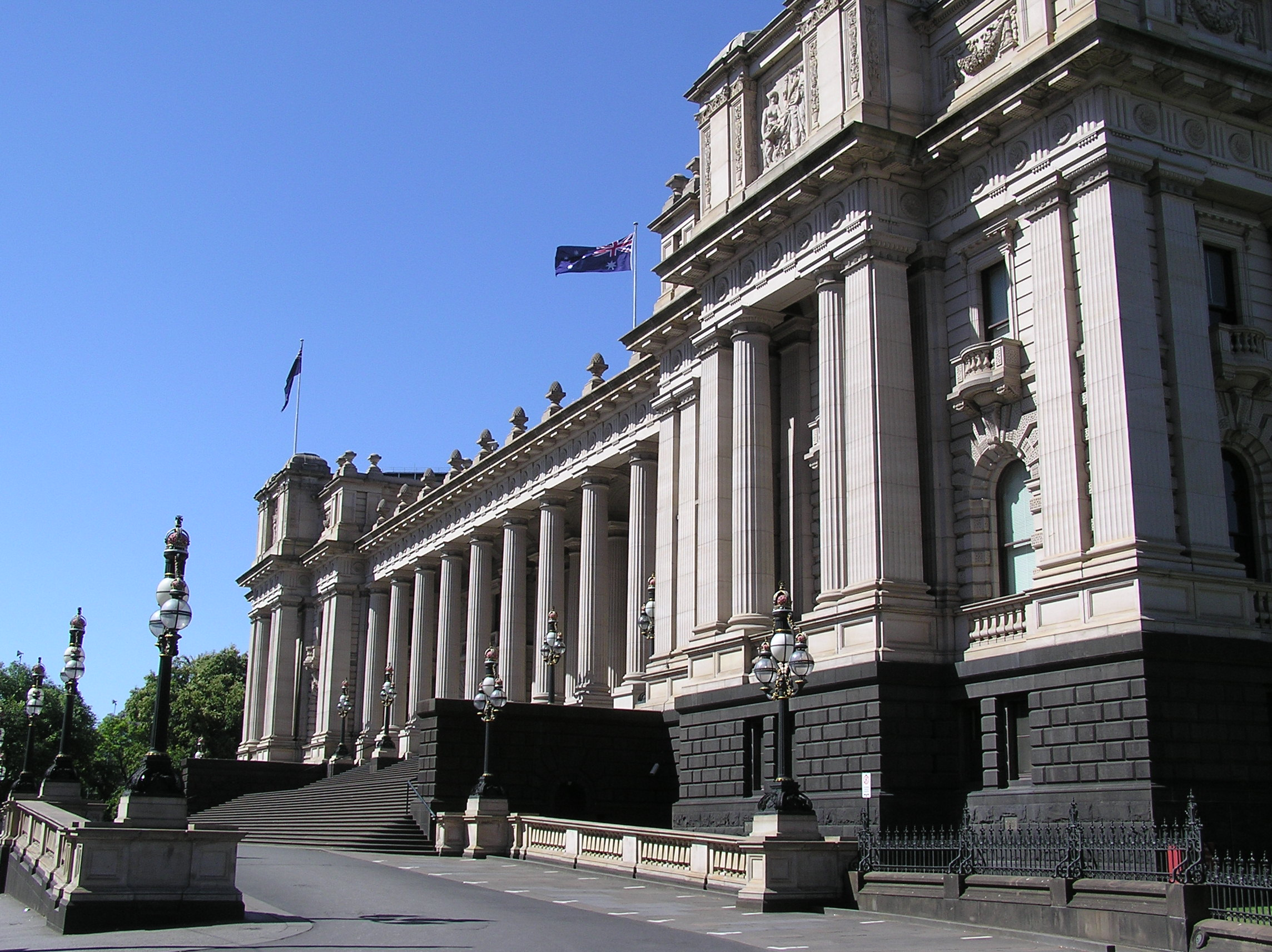

Parliament of Victoria
- Long title: An Act to provide for and regulate access to voluntary assisted dying, to establish the Voluntary Assisted Dying Review Board, to make consequential amendments to the Births, Deaths and Marriages Registration Act 1996, the Coroners Act 2008, the Drugs, Poisons and Controlled Substances Act 1981, the Health Records Act 2001, the Medical Treatment Planning and Decisions Act 2016, the Pharmacy Regulation Act 2010 and other Acts and for other purposes.
- Citation: No. 61 of 2017
- Passed by: Legislative Assembly
- Passed: 20 October 2017
- Passed by: Legislative Council
- Passed: 22 November 2017
- Royal assent: 5 December 2017
- Commenced: 19 June 2019

Legislative history

Initiating chamber: Legislative Assembly
- Bill title: Voluntary Assisted Dying Bill 2017
- Introduced by: Hon. Jill Hennessy MP
- Introduced: 20 September 2017
- First reading: 20 September 2017
- Second reading: 18 October 2017
- Consideration in detail: 19–20 October 2017
- Third reading: 20 October 2017

Revising chamber: Legislative Council
- Bill title: Voluntary Assisted Dying Bill 2017
- Received from the Legislative Assembly: 20 October 2017
- Member(s) in charge: Hon. Gavin Jennings MLC
- First reading: 20 October 2017
- Second reading: 3 November 2017
- Committee of the whole: 14–22 November 2017
- Third reading: 22 November 2017

Final stages
- Legislative Council amendments considered by the Legislative Assembly: 29 November 2017
- Finally passed both chambers: 29 November 2017

Summary
- To provide for and regulate access to voluntary assisted dying

Keywords
- Euthanasia, Right to die
- Status: Amended

On 29 November 2017, Victoria became the first Australian state to pass legislation allowing assisted suicide. The law gives anyone suffering a terminal illness, with less than six months to live, the right to end their life. The Voluntary Assisted Dying Act 2017 (No. 61 of 2017) had an 18-month implementation period, and came into effect on 19 June 2019.

== The bill ==
On 20 September 2017, the Voluntary Assisted Dying Bill 2017 was introduced into the Legislative Assembly of the Victorian Parliament by the Andrews Labor Government. The bill is modelled on the recommendations of an expert panel chaired by former Australian Medical Association president Professor Brian Owler. The proposed legislation was said by proponents to be the most conservative in the world; it contains 68 safeguards including measures designed to protect vulnerable people from coercion and abuse, as well as a Review Board to promote compliance. Labor and Coalition MPs were allowed a conscience vote on the Bill.

The bill was debated in the lower house over three sitting days, passing the assembly without amendment on 20 October 2017 after an emotional and tense debate which lasted more than 24 hours. The bill was passed by 47 votes to 37. The bill moved to the Legislative Council for debate.

Former Prime Minister Paul Keating spoke out against the passing of the bill to the upper house saying "the passage of the Voluntary Assisted Dying Bill through the Victorian lower house is truly a sad moment for the whole country."

The Prime Minister at the time, Malcolm Turnbull, who is also against euthanasia, said:

It is the Victorian parliament's job to do this, I'm not a supporter of euthanasia but I have been following the debate and it would be very interesting to see if their upper house passes it and what follows on from it. ... Federal law prevails over a state law but only in an area that both the Commonwealth and the state parliament have jurisdiction, so you've got to begin with an area where the federal parliament has jurisdiction.

On 14 November 2017, the government agreed to a series of amendments designed to garner further support for the bill in the council. For terminally ill adults in severe pain and with only 12 months to live, the deadline to access lethal drugs was cut to six months, except for sufferers of neurodegenerative conditions such as motor neurone disease and multiple sclerosis. Additionally, an amendment restricting this scheme to people who have lived in Victoria for 12 months was accepted, as was a requirement for a death to be documented as assisted dying, in addition to noting the underlying disease. Funding for palliative care in regional areas was also increased as part of the agreement. On 22 November 2017, the bill in its amended form passed the council by 22 votes to 18, after a marathon sitting lasting more than 28 hours.

The bill returned to the Legislative Assembly for consideration of the council's amendments. The Assembly approved of the council's amendments on 29 November 2017. In passing the legislation, Victoria became the first state to legalise assisted suicide. The law received royal assent on 5 December 2017, and came into effect on 19 June 2019. The 18-month period allowed for implementation of the scheme including establishment of a review board.

== Reactions ==
Kathy Eagar, the executive director of the Australian Palliative Care Outcomes Collaboration, and director of the Australian Health Services Research Institute at the University of Wollongong, has analysed the statistics surrounding euthanasia internationally, and says the law is limited. According to Eagar, the most important reason people choose euthanasia is that they don't want to lose their independence and autonomy. She believes euthanasia is a social issue and not a health issue, and maintains that less than one in five people choose euthanasia due to pain.

They've been very careful and very cautious in the approach, but a lot of the people who've been very strong advocates for euthanasia are not people with a life expectancy of less than 12 months. They are people living with debilitating conditions for many, many years and they won't be eligible for voluntary assisted dying under the legislation... "The conversation about, 'I am doing this because I want to make existential choices about the end of my life', that's a much harder conversation to have as a community, but it is the one we need."

— Kathy Eagar

Lorraine Baker, the Victorian President of the Australian Medical Association, said that the passing of the legislation marked a "significant shift" in medical practice in Victoria, but the conscientious objection provisions contained in the legislation would ensure that doctors would not be forced into taking part in voluntary assisted dying.

The outcome of this parliamentary vote will cause anguish for some members of our profession, as well as the public...(doctors should not be involved in) interventions that have as their primary intention the ending of a person's life

— Lorraine Baker, The Age newspaper 22 November 2017

Euthanasia advocate Philip Nitschke called the law "beg and grovel legislation" because people will only be able to access it as a privilege granted in extremis rather than as a right to be accessed at a time nominated by the patient.

== First use ==
Kerry Robertson was the first person to be granted a permit under the Voluntary Assisted Dying Act 2017. Robertson was diagnosed with breast cancer in 2010 and was declared cancer free after surgery, chemotherapy and radiation treatment. Four years later she developed a tumour in her bones that spread to her lungs and brain. When the cancer spread to her liver Robertson ceased treatment. Her palliative care team was unable to ease the pain. Robertson applied for the permit on the first day the act came into force, 19 June 2019, citing "loss of joy" as her reason. Robertson died on 15 July 2019 at the age of 61 with her two daughters, and best friend by her side.

== Subsequent amendments ==
In October 2025 the government announced the Voluntary Assisted Dying Amendment Bill 2025 in response to the first prescribed five-year independent review into assisted dying. The changes seek to expand the eligibility timeframe for all terminal diagnoses from six to 12 months and remove the so-called "gag clause" which forbade doctors from initiating conversations about voluntary assisted dying with patients. Furthermore registered health practitioners who conscientiously object will be required to provide minimum information to a patient and people with neurodegenerative conditions will no longer need a third prognosis if their expected lifespan is between six and 12 months. The Voluntary Assisted Dying Amendment Act 2025 (No. 50 of 2025) passed the parliament in November 2025.

== See also ==
External videos
- Fact check: Has assisted dying been a legal slippery slope overseas?

- Euthanasia in Australia
- Health care in Australia
- Voluntary assisted dying in Western Australia
- Euthanasia in New Zealand
- Oregon Death With Dignity Act
- California End of Life Option Act
- Assisted suicide
