= Fiona Stewart (author) =

Australian author and activist

Fiona J. Stewart
- Born: 15 May 1966 (age 60); Melbourne, Australia
- Education: Monash University (B.A.); La Trobe University (M.A., Ph.D.); CDU (LL.B)
- Occupation: Author
- Spouse: Philip Nitschke
- Writing career
- Subjects: Generation X, Feminism, Human sexuality
- Website: Exit International

Fiona Stewart is an Australian author and was the executive director of Exit International – an organisation which advocates for the legalisation of voluntary euthanasia and assisted suicide – from 2004 to 2007. She is co-author with her husband, euthanasia advocate Philip Nitschke, of two books about euthanasia. She now vets people for eligibility to join Exit, calling herself "the door bitch".

== Early life and education ==
Fiona Stewart was born in Melbourne and attended at Lauriston Girls' School.

She received her BA from Monash University in 1987 followed by a Graduate Diploma in Public Policy (Melbourne University) in 1992, Master of Policy and Law (La Trobe University) in 1994 and her Ph.D. in health sciences from La Trobe in 1998.

She graduated from Charles Darwin University Law School in 2015. She earned a distinction for her honours research thesis on rational suicide and testamentary capacity, which is "a person's legal and mental capacity to make a valid will".

== Career ==
Stewart authored a series of papers on feminism, gender and human sexuality in the 1990s. She then changed to writing opinion columns for the media on Generation X and feminism.

Stewart worked as an opinion writer for The Age, The Australian, and other Australian papers and media outlets, and as an online learning consultant with Dale Spender.

In 2002, Stewart founded the short-lived consumer complaints website Notgoodenough.org, where she was active in promoting the consumer standpoint and criticising big businesses such as Telstra, the national carrier.

She has participated widely in Australian public debate on varied current affairs issues.

== Euthanasia ==
Steward met euthanasia activist Philip Nitschke at the Brisbane Festival of Ideas in 2001 during the Late Night Live debate "There's no such thing as a new idea".

She worked with Nitschke on The Peaceful Pill eHandbook and in Exit International. She was executive director of the Exit International from 2004 to 2007.

In the 2014 Victorian election she stood for the Upper House for the Voluntary Euthanasia Party but was not elected, with the party receiving only 0.49% of first preference votes.

== Personal life ==
Stewart married Philip Nitschke around 2009.

== Books ==
Stewart is the co-author of three books:

- Internet Communication and Qualitative Research, A Handbook for Researching Online; Sage, 2000 (With Dr Chris Mann)
- Killing Me Softly: Voluntary Euthanasia and the road to the Peaceful Pill; Penguin, 2005
- The Peaceful Pill Handbook series

== See also ==
- Terminal illness
- Right to die
- Euthanasia in Australia
