= OurSay =

- Formation: August 2010; 16 years ago
- Type: Social Enterprise
- Headquarters: Melbourne, Australia
- Region served: Australia
- Website: oursay.org

OurSay is a social media group based in Melbourne, Australia that focuses on participation in public debate. The organization actively reaches 2 million Australians as of September 2016 primarily located in Melbourne, Sydney and Brisbane.

== History ==
OurSay was founded by Eyal Halamish, Matthew Gordon, Gautam Raju, Linh Do and Hedda Ransan-Elliott and launched in Melbourne, Australia in August 2010 during the Australian federal elections where members of the public posted and voted for questions on the OurSay website and political candidates for the federal electorate of Melbourne Adam Bandt and Cath Bowtell responded to the top questions. Then finance minister and federal member for Melbourne Lindsay Tanner resigned from his political career and declined to participate in the OurSay forum.

In November 2010, OurSay executed its second forum in Brunswick, Victoria, where citizens in the electorate of Brunswick, posted and voted for questions to political candidates Jane Garrett, Phil Cleary, and Cyndi Dawes. Citizens were invited to a local pub where the most voted for questions on OurSay were asked and responses were live video recorded and uploaded to the site. This presented the essence of OurSay, integrating online and offline citizen engagement with decision-makers.

From November 2010 to August 2012, OurSay experimented with the execution of its technology and offline engagement. Some experiments included a partnership with Q&A (Australian talk show), where a top question asker posed their question on national television and the Climate Agenda, where a senior reporter at The Sunday Age reported on the most voted for questions about climate change on OurSay for 10 consecutive weeks. OurSay was reviewed by media expert and academic Margaret Simons as a new model for journalism where the audience is driving the content.

In July 2012, OurSay hosted a forum with Prime Minister of Australia Julia Gillard, the first national head of state to participate. OurSay partnered with Google+, Fairfax Media, Deakin University, and the office of the Prime Minister of Australia.

In July 2016, OurSay secured a seed round of capital investment to improve its platform and tailor it specifically for the local government market as a "self-serve" platform for democracy and public engagement.

The current board of directors of OurSay include Eyal Halamish and Matthew Gordon.
