= Anthony Chisholm (politician) =

Australian politician

Senator The Honourable Anthony Chisholm
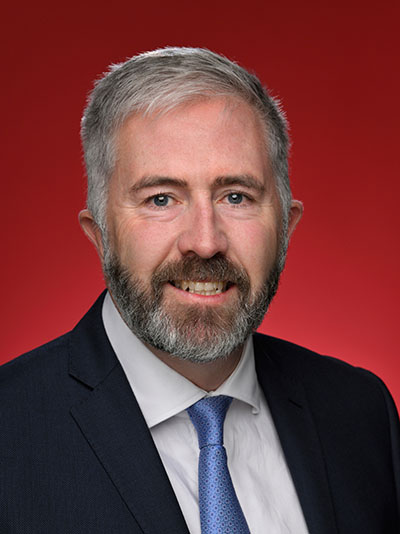

Assistant Minister for Regional Development
- Incumbent
- Assumed office 1 June 2022
- Prime Minister: Anthony Albanese
- Preceded by: Nola Marino

Assistant Minister for Agriculture, Fisheries and Forestry
- Incumbent
- Assumed office 29 July 2024
- Prime Minister: Anthony Albanese
- Preceded by: Jonno Duniam (2022)

Assistant Minister for Resources
- Incumbent
- Assumed office 13 May 2025
- Prime Minister: Anthony Albanese
- Preceded by: Office established

Assistant Minister for Education
- In office 1 June 2022 – 13 May 2025
- Prime Minister: Anthony Albanese
- Preceded by: Simon Birmingham (2015)
- Succeeded by: Julian Hill

Senator for Queensland
- Incumbent
- Assumed office 2 July 2016
- Preceded by: Joe Ludwig

Secretary of the Queensland Labor Party
- In office 9 October 2008 – 12 November 2014
- Leader: Anna Bligh; Annastacia Palaszczuk
- Preceded by: Milton Dick
- Succeeded by: Evan Moorhead

Personal details
- Born: 24 February 1978 (age 48) Brisbane, Queensland, Australia
- Party: Labor
- Spouse: Stella
- Children: 3
- Education: Griffith University
- Occupation: Politician
- Website: www.anthonychisholm.org.au

Anthony David Chisholm (born 24 February 1978) is an Australian politician. He is a member of the Australian Labor Party (ALP) and has been a Senator for Queensland since 2016. He was appointed an assistant minister in the Albanese government following the party's victory at the 2022 federal election. He previously served as the party's state secretary from 2008 to 2014.

== Early life ==
Chisholm was born in Brisbane. He is the youngest of five children born to Marion (née Leary) and Neville Chisholm, who moved from Tasmania to Queensland shortly before he was born. He grew up in the city's northern suburbs and attended Wavell State High School. He later graduated from Griffith University with a Bachelor of Arts majoring in politics and international relations.

== Politics ==
Chisholm joined the ALP in 1995. He was the party's candidate in Warrego at the 2001 Queensland state election, aged 22. He worked as an organiser from 2004 to 2007, initially with the national secretariat and then with the state branch. He then joined the staff of opposition leader Kevin Rudd as an advisor.

Chisholm served as state secretary of the ALP in Queensland from 2008 to 2014. He directed the party's successful campaign at the 2015 state election. Immediately prior to his election to parliament he work for Santos Limited, "providing advice on maintaining mainstream political support amid an ongoing campaign against the coal seam gas (CSG) industry by environmental and landholder groups".

=== Parliament ===
Following the retirement of Senator Joe Ludwig, Chisholm won ALP preselection for the 2016 federal election and was elected to the Senate.

He has served on a number of committees, and in February 2020 was made chair of the Select Committee on Administration of Sports Grants. He was deputy chair on the "Inquiry into the destruction of 46,000 year old caves at the Juukan Gorge in the Pilbara region of Western Australia", which delivered its interim report in December 2020.

Chisholm is a member of the right faction of the Labor Party.

In June 2022, Chisholm was appointed Assistant Minister for Education and Assistant Minister for Regional Development in the Albanese government. In July 2024, he was appointed Assistant Minister for Agriculture, Fisheries and Forestry.

Following the Labor government's re-election at the 2025 Australian federal election, Chisholm continued as Assistant Minister for Regional Development and Assistant Minister for Agriculture, Fisheries and Forestry, was appointed Assistant Minister for Resources, while the post of Assistant Minister for Education was abolished.
