= Norfolk Island Act 1979 =

Australian law

Parliament of Australia
- Long title: An Act to provide for the government of Norfolk Island.
- Citation: Norfolk Island Act 1979 (Cth)
- Royal assent: 30 May 1979

Legislative history
- Introduced by: Bob Ellicott MP
- First reading: 23 November 1978
- Second reading: 5 April 1979
- Third reading: 5 April 1979
- Status: In force

The Norfolk Island Act 1979 is an act of the Parliament of Australia. It acknowledged the sovereign British Possession of Norfolk Islands' powers of self-government in conjunction to standing Australian policy. The Act formally recognised the Norfolk Island Legislative Assembly and the Assembly's powers to pass, amend, and repeal laws, and – subject to the assent of the Administrator of Norfolk Island – executive powers. The Act was made under the powers granted to Parliament in section 122 of the Constitution of Australia.

The Norfolk Island Legislation Amendment Act 2015 passed the Australian Parliament on 14 May 2015 (Assented on 26 May 2015) abolishing self-government on Norfolk Island and transferring Norfolk Island into a council as part of New South Wales law. 1 From July, 2016 Norfolk Island legislation was transferred to New South Wales and subject to NSW legislation.

In February 2016, the Australian Parliament passed the Territories Legislation Amendment Act 2016 (Assented on 23 March 2016) to enhance further political reforms on Norfolk Island.

In December 2020, another round of territories reform legislation (as the “Territories Legislation Amendment Act 2020”) was passed and assented to.
