= Philip Nitschke =

Australian humanist (born 1947)

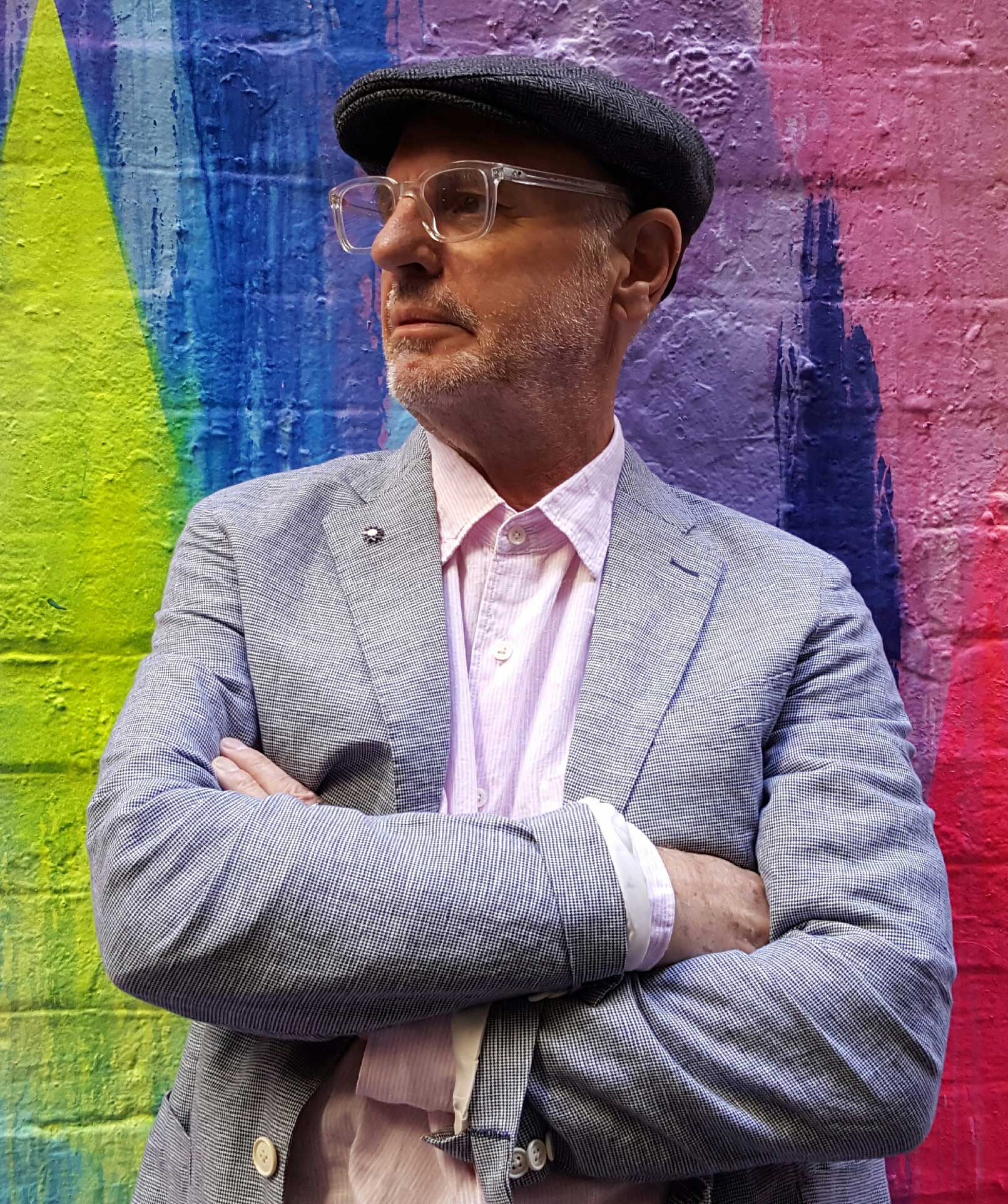
- Nitschke in 2016
- Born: 8 August 1947 (age 79); Ardrossan, South Australia, Australia
- Education: University of Adelaide (BSc); Flinders University (PhD), University of Sydney (M.B.B.S.)
- Occupations: Author and Euthanasia advocate
- Years active: 1988–present
- Organisation: EXIT International
- Known for: Influencing euthanasia debate
- Notable work: The Peaceful Pill Handbook
- Political party: Voluntary Euthanasia Party
- Spouse: Fiona Stewart

Philip Haig Nitschke (/ˈnɪtʃkɪ/; born 8 August 1947) is an Australian humanist, author, former physician, and founder and director of the pro-euthanasia group Exit International. He campaigned successfully to have a legal euthanasia law passed in Australia's Northern Territory and assisted four people in ending their lives before the law was overturned by the Government of Australia. Nitschke was the first doctor in the world to administer a legal, voluntary, lethal injection, after which the patient activated the syringe using a computer.

In 2015, the Medical Board of Australia (AHPRA) permanently suspended Nitschke's registration as a doctor due to "professional misconduct and unprofessional conduct". Nitschke has been referred to in the media as "Dr Death". Former UN medical director Michael Irwin branded him “totally irresponsible” for telling people how to obtain drugs that could help them end their own lives, and relatives of people who took their lives after contact with Exit International have denounced Nitschke, saying their loved ones were not in a rational state of mind at the time.

== Early life and education ==
Nitschke was born in 1947 in Ardrossan, South Australia, the son of school teachers Harold and Gweneth (Gwen) Nitschke.

As described in the partly autobiographical book Killing Me Softly, Nitschke, at age 16, was molested by a couple with whom he was boarding. He took revenge by cutting their dog's throat with a knife.

Nitschke studied physics at the University of Adelaide, gaining a PhD from Flinders University in laser physics in 1972.

Rejecting a career in the sciences, he instead travelled to the Northern Territory to take up work with the Aboriginal land rights activist Vincent Lingiari and the Gurindji at Wave Hill. After the hand-back of land by the prime minister Gough Whitlam, Nitschke became a Northern Territory Parks and Wildlife ranger. However, after badly injuring his subtalar joint, which effectively finished his career as a ranger, he began studying for a medical degree. In addition to having long been interested in studying medicine, he has suffered from hypochondria most of his adult life and futilely hoped with his medical studies to educate himself out of the problem.

Nitschke graduated from the University of Sydney Medical School in 1989.

== Early career ==
After graduating Nitschke worked as an intern at Royal Darwin Hospital, and then as an after-hours general practitioner. When the Northern Territory branch of the Australian Medical Association publicly opposed the proposed Northern Territory legislation to provide for legal euthanasia, Nitschke and a small group of dissenting Territory doctors published a contrary opinion in the NT News under the banner Doctors for change. This put him in a position of an informal spokesperson for the proposed legislation. After the Rights of the Terminally Ill Act (ROTI Act) came into force on 1 July 1996, Nitschke assisted four terminally ill people to end their lives using the Deliverance Machine he developed. This practice was ceased when the ROTI Act was effectively nullified by the Australian Parliament's Euthanasia Laws Act 1997.

In the 1996 Australian federal election, Nitschke ran in the seat of the Northern Territory for the Australian Greens but was unsuccessful.

After the ROTI Act was nullified, Nitschke began providing advice to others about how they can end their lives, leading to the formation of Exit International in 1997. A notable case of Nitschke's was that of Nancy Crick, aged 69. On 22 May 2002, Crick, in the presence of over 20 friends and family (but not Nitschke), took a lethal dose of barbiturates, went quickly to sleep and died within 20 minutes. Nitschke had encouraged Crick to enter palliative care, which she did for a number of days before returning home again. She had undergone multiple surgeries to treat bowel cancer and was left with multiple dense and inoperable bowel adhesions that left her in constant pain and frequently in the toilet with diarrhoea. She was not, however, terminally ill at the time of her death. Nitschke said the scar tissue from previous cancer surgery had caused her suffering. "She didn't actually want to die when she had cancer. She wanted to die after she had cancer treatment," he said.

Nitschke made headlines in New Zealand when he announced plans to accompany eight New Zealanders to Mexico where the drug Nembutal, capable of producing a fatal overdose, can be purchased legally. He also made headlines, even angering some fellow right-to-die advocates, when he presented his plan to launch a "death ship" that would have allowed him to circumvent local laws by euthanising people from around the world in international waters.

In the 2007 Australian federal election, Nitschke ran against the Australian politician Kevin Andrews in the Victorian seat of Menzies but was unsuccessful.

In 2009, Nitschke helped to promote Dignified Departure, a 13-hour, pay-television program on doctor-assisted suicide in Hong Kong and mainland China. The program aired in October in China on the Family Health channel, run by the official China National Radio.

Organisations opposed to euthanasia, as well as some supporting euthanasia, are critical of Nitschke and his methods.

== Suspension of medical licence ==
In February 2014 Nitschke was approached after a workshop by Nigel Brayley, 45. Brayley was facing ongoing questions about the death of his wife, which police were treating as suspected murder. Two other female friends of his had also died, one of whom is still missing. Nitschke recounts that Brayley rebuffed suggestions to seek counselling and had already obtained the drug Nembutal. Brayley then committed suicide in May 2014. Although Nitschke was unaware of the investigation at the time, he now believes that Brayley, whom he described as a "serial killer", had made a rational decision to commit suicide rather than face long imprisonment. Nitschke stated that he does not believe he could have changed Brayley's mind, that Brayley was not his patient, that Brayley was not depressed and did not seek or want Nitschke's advice. The Medical Board of Australia (MBA) and Beyondblue said Nitschke had an obligation to refer the man to a psychologist or psychiatrist.

On 23 July 2014, as a consequence of the Brayley case, the MBA voted to use emergency powers to suspend his practitioner's licence immediately, on the grounds that he presented "a serious risk to public health and safety". Nitschke said he would appeal the suspension, which he claimed was politically motivated, and that the Board "made it clear that what they really object to is the way I think. It's ideas they object to — namely, my belief that people should have a right to suicide, is something they think is contrary to medical practice." The MBA later clarified that the suspension was an interim measure pending the outcome of an inquiry. Nitschke said the suspension will not affect his work for Exit International and that he had not practised medicine for years.

Beyondblue's chairman Jeff Kennett, a supporter of euthanasia for the terminally ill, said Nitschke had damaged the cause of euthanasia for the terminally ill, and welcomed the decision to suspend Nitschke. Kennett said "We cannot allow the debate to start that it's alright for a 16-year-old, or a 45-year-old, simply because they're having an off day, to attempt to take their own life. It is not acceptable. I think [Nitschke] has put his cause back, that is for a very properly defined legislative framework where people who are terminally ill, under certain circumstances when all their dignity has left them, have the right to exit this world, I think he's done that a lot of damage."

Nitschke appealed to an MBA tribunal in Darwin to have his July 2014 suspension from practising medicine overturned. In late 2014 the appeal was rejected on the grounds that, although it was accepted that Brayley was not Nitschke's patient, the controversial concept of rational suicide was inconsistent with the medical profession's code of conduct and that, as a medical practitioner providing advice on suicide, he posed a serious risk because people may elect to commit suicide believing it to be a pathway sanctioned by a medical practitioner and perhaps the medical profession generally. Nitschke then appealed the tribunal's decision to the Darwin Supreme Court.

On 6 July 2015 the Northern Territory supreme court upheld Nitschke's appeal, finding the emergency suspension of his licence by the MBA should not have been upheld by a review tribunal. Justice Hiley's ruling said that the tribunal and board had misconstrued the doctors’ code of conduct, which requires them to "protect and promote the health of individuals", as extending to all doctors and all individuals. "A doctor would constantly need to fear that any interaction with any other individual or community, including an individual who is not and never has been his or her patient, may be in breach of the (code), even if the doctor did nothing in circumstances where there was no other obligation to do something," he said. Nitschke said the MBA's erroneous interpretation was "ludicrous" and flew in the face of common law. Nitschke's lawyer will apply for costs of approximately AU$300,000, which were paid using donations, including $20,000 from Swiss euthanasia organisation Dignitas.

In October 2015 the MBA lifted Nitschke's suspension but drew up a list of 25 conditions under which Nitschke could continue to practise. These conditions included prohibitions on giving advice or information to the public or patients about euthanasia, or Nembutal, or suicide, and forcing him to rescind his endorsement of and involvement with the 'Peaceful Pill' handbook and related videos. In response Nitschke, calling the MBA's actions "a heavy-handed and clumsy attempt to restrict the free flow of information on end-of-life choice", surveyed more than 1,000 members of his advocacy group, Exit International, and received strong support for ending his medical registration. As a consequence of the MBA restrictions and the results of the member survey, Nitschke publicly burned his medical practising certificate and announced the end of his medical career, vowing to continue to promote euthanasia.

Nitschke stated that he will remain a doctor and will legitimately use the title "doctor" (he has a PhD), and will continue to see patients and Exit members in clinics that he runs in Australia and other countries. In the wake of this incident, Nitschke and his partner, Fiona Stewart, decided in 2015 to relocate to the more liberal politico-legal environment of Holland.

== Conflict with police ==
Nitschke states that he and his group are regularly subject to harassment by authorities, including detention and questioning at international airports, and raids on homes and the premises of Exit International.

On 2 May 2009 Nitschke was detained for nine hours by British Immigration officials at Heathrow Airport after arriving for a visit to the UK to lecture on voluntary euthanasia and end-of-life choices. Nitschke said it was a matter of free speech and that his detention said something about changes to British society which were "quite troubling". Nitschke was told that he and his wife, author Fiona Stewart, were detained because the workshops may contravene British law. However, although assisting someone to commit suicide in the UK was illegal, the law did not apply to a person lecturing on the concept of euthanasia, and Nitschke was allowed to enter. Dame Joan Bakewell, the British government's "Voice of Older People", said that the current British law on assisted suicide was "a mess" and that Nitschke should have been made more welcome in the UK.

On 1 August 2014, after euthanasia advocate Max Bromson, 66, who suffered from terminal bone cancer, ended his life with Nembutal in a Glenelg motel room, surrounded by family members, police carried out a three-hour raid on Exit International's Adelaide premises, interrogating Nitschke and seizing Nitschke's phones, computers and other items. Nitschke said he felt violated by the "heavy-handed and unnecessary" police actions and confiscations that would cripple Exit International's activities. In August 2016, after exactly two years of investigation, South Australian police advised that no charges would be laid against anyone over the death. In 2019, Nitschke's phone and computer were finally returned.

In April 2016, British police, acting on an Interpol drug alert, forced entry into the home of a member of Nitschke's organisation, retired professor Dr Avril Henry, aged 81, who was in failing health. Without knocking, police —accompanied by a psychiatrist, GP and social worker— forced their way into Dr Henry's home by smashing her glass front door at 10 pm and questioned her for six hours, confiscating a bottle of imported Nembutal, and leaving at 4 am. They decided Dr Henry "had capacity" and would not be sectioned (detained involuntarily for mental assessment). Worried that the police would return and confiscate her remaining Nembutal, she committed suicide four days later. Dr Nitschke commented that police had made Dr Henry's last days on earth a misery and that “police need to realise that in the UK, suicide is not a crime, and mental health authorities need to recognise that not everyone who seeks to end their life is in need of psychiatric intervention", adding that the police action was "a significant abuse of power against a vulnerable elderly woman".

In May 2018, Australian Federal Police used local police force personnel in different regions of the country to conduct late night raids on the homes of elderly Exit members, demanding to know if they had bought the euthanasia drug Nembutal.

=== Operation Painter ===
In October 2016, New Zealand police, in a "sting" operation code named "Operation Painter", set up roadblocks (checkpoints) outside an Exit International meeting and took down names and addresses of all attendees. Some of the elderly members of the group were later visited at their homes by police with warrants, and searches were conducted. Computers, tablets, cameras, letters and books were seized. Nitschke said police actions were unprecedented and probably in breach of the Bill of Rights, which guaranteed freedom of association. The police operation was the subject of an Independent Police Conduct Authority investigation. Legal action against the police followed. In March 2018, the Independent Police Conduct Authority found Operation Painter to be illegal.

This coincided with another action by New Zealand police in which 76-year old Patsy McGrath, a member of Nitschke's Exit group, had her home raided in 2016 and her store-bought helium balloon cylinder confiscated under warrant. The confiscation of the cylinder was later found to be illegal and it was returned to her in 2018.

== Views on euthanasia ==
=== Dying with dignity ===
On 29 April 2009 Nitschke said: "It seems we demand humans to live with indignity, pain and anguish whereas we are kinder to our pets when their suffering becomes too much. It simply is not logical or mature. Trouble is, we have had too many centuries of religious claptrap." He works mainly with older people from whom he gains inspiration, saying: "You get quite inspired and uplifted by the elderly folk who see this as quite a practical approach".

In July 2009 Nitschke said he no longer believed voluntary euthanasia should only be available to the terminally ill, but that elderly people afraid of getting old and incapacitated should also have a choice.

Nitschke expects that a growing number of people importing their own euthanasia drugs "really don't care if the law is changed or not".

=== Palliative care ===
Palliative care specialists state that many requests for euthanasia arise from fear of physical or psychological distress in the patient's last days, and that widespread and equitable availability of specialist palliative care services will reduce requests for euthanasia. Nitschke is dismissive of this argument. "We have too many people who have the best palliative care in the world and they still want to know that they can put an end to things," he said. "By and large, palliative care have done pretty well out of the argument over the euthanasia issue, because they are the ones that have argued that they just need better funding and then no one will ever want to die – that's a lie."

=== Younger people and suicide ===
In 2010 the Victorian Institute of Forensic Medicine released a report into Australian deaths caused by the drug Nembutal, which Nitschke recommends as a euthanasia drug. Of the 51 deaths studied, 14 were of people between the ages of 20 and 40. Nitschke acknowledged that the information about the drug that was provided online could be accessed by people below the age of 50 who were not terminally ill, but argued that the risk was necessary in order to help the elderly and the seriously ill.

It was alleged that Joe Waterman, 25, had committed suicide after accessing Nitschke's online euthanasia handbook, by misrepresenting his age as over 50. Waterman subsequently imported Nembutal and ended his life. In another case Lucas Taylor, 26, committed suicide in Germany by taking Nembutal after soliciting advice at an Exit International online forum (which, according to Nitschke, he accessed by claiming his age was 65).

=== Individual rights argument ===
Nitschke argues that an individual person has a fundamental right to control their own death just as they have a right to control their own life. He believes in having the "Peaceful Pill" available for every adult of sound mind.

=== Opposition to nitrogen hypoxia execution technique ===
In 2024, Nitschke appeared in an Alabama court as an expert witness to oppose the state's plan to execute convicted killer Kenneth Smith using a mask-and-gas technique incorporating nitrogen. He testified that the mask-and-gas approach had been rejected decades ago because it was unreliable, and that Smith could be "horribly maimed without a complete seal between mask and face" leading to incomplete cerebral hypoxia and a resultant vegetative state. Nitschke said that nitrogen must be delivered correctly to work as intended. He said the Alabama nitrogen hypoxia method was "quick and nasty" and ignored the possibilities of vomiting and air leakage.

== Censorship ==
=== Internet ===
On 22 May 2009 it was disclosed in the press, citing WikiLeaks, that the Australian Government had added the online Peaceful Pill Handbook to the blacklist maintained by the Australian Communications and Media Authority used to filter internet access to citizens of Australia. The Australian Communications Minister, Stephen Conroy, planned to introduce legislation just before the 2010 election to make internet service providers block a blacklist of "refused classification" websites. The blacklist is expected to include Exit's websites and other similar sites. Nitschke said the proposals were the "final nail in the coffin for euthanasia advocacy" in Australia, where people are banned from discussing end-of-life issues over the phone, buying books about it or importing printed material on it. "The one avenue we had open to us was the internet, and now it looks like it will be part of Conroy's grand plan to provide a so-called clean feed to Australia. It's outrageous."

In April 2010 Nitschke began holding a series of "Hacking Masterclasses" to teach people how to circumvent the Australian internet filter. Access to Nitschke's online Peaceful Pill Handbook was blocked during trials of the government's filter. A government spokeswoman said euthanasia would not be targeted by the proposed filter, but confirmed that "The (website) ... for accessing an electronic version of the [Peaceful Pill Handbook] was classified as refused classification" because it provided detailed instruction in "crimes relating to the possession, manufacture and importation of barbiturates".

Nitschke said Exit International would investigate if it could set up its own proxy server or VPN tunnel, so its members had a safe way of accessing its information.

In January 2018, YouTube deleted Nitschke's YouTube channel "Exityourtube". The channel had been operating for 10 years. YouTube gave no reason why the account was deleted without notice.

=== Television ===
On 10 September 2010 Nitschke complained that the Commercials Advice self-regulator of advertising content on Australian commercial television had prevented the television screening of a paid advertisement from Exit International in which an actor depicted a dying man who requested the option of voluntary euthanasia. Commercials Advice reportedly cited Section 2.17.5 of the Commercial Television Code of Practice: Suicide. The advertisement was felt to condone the practice of suicide. Nitschke responded that the acts of Commercials Advice constitute interference with the right to free speech. Similar TV commercials, planned for use during Nitschke's Canadian lecture tour of 2010, were likewise banned by the Television Bureau of Canada, after lobbying by anti-euthanasia pressure groups.

=== Billboards ===
In 2010 Nitschke planned to use billboards in Australia to feature the message "85 per cent of Australians support voluntary euthanasia but our government won't listen". In September 2010, Nitschke's billboard advertising campaign was blocked by Billboards Australia. Billboards Australia cited section of the NSW Crimes Act that outlaws the aiding or abetting of suicide or attempted suicide. Nitschke was told to provide legal advice outlining how his billboard did not break this law, a request Nitschke described as "ludicrous", pointing out that the billboards urge "political change and in no way could be considered to be in breach of the crimes act". Nitschke said he had sought a legal opinion from prominent human rights lawyer Greg Barns. The lawyer was able to convince Billboards Australia to rescind its ruling, in part.

== Euthanasia techniques ==
=== Exit bag and CoGen ===
Nitschke created devices to aid people who want euthanasia, including a product called the "exit bag" (a large plastic bag with a drawstring allowing it to be secured around the neck) and the "CoGen" (or "Co-Genie") device. The CoGen device generates the deadly gas carbon monoxide, which is inhaled with a face mask.

=== Euthanasia device ===
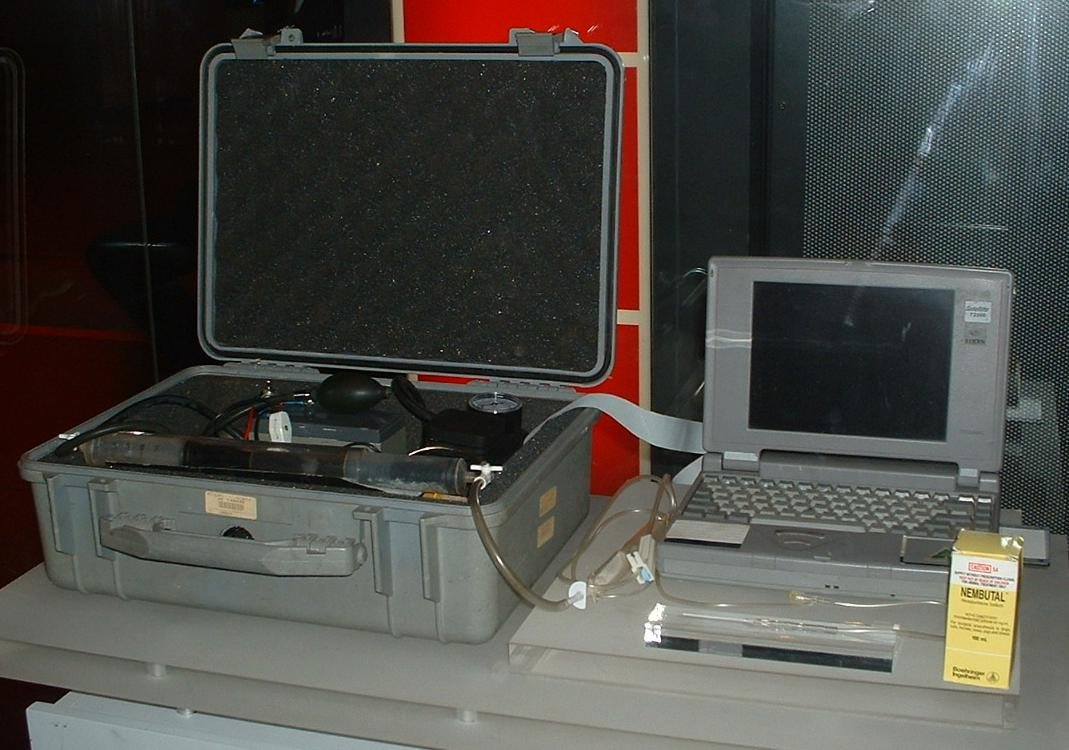
Philip Nitschke's "Deliverance Machine"

In December 2008 Nitschke released to the media details of a euthanasia machine. He called it "flawless" and "undetectable", saying the new process uses ordinary household products including a barbecue gas bottle — available from hardware stores — filled with nitrogen. Nitschke developed a process in which patients lose consciousness immediately and die a few minutes later.

Nitschke said: "So it's extremely quick and there are no drugs. Importantly this doesn't fail – it's reliable, peaceful, available and with the additional benefit of undetectability."

=== Barbiturate testing kit ===
In 2009 Nitschke made a barbiturate testing kit available, initially launched in the UK, then Australia. Nitschke said the kit was made available by Exit International in response to growing demand for something to test the Nembutal obtained from Mexico, often delivered in the post without labels. "They want to be sure they have the right concentration," Nitschke said. The kits have chemicals that change colour when mixed with Nembutal. He was detained for an hour for questioning on arrival at Auckland Airport in New Zealand on a trip to hold public meetings and launch the kit.

=== Pentobarbital long-storage pill ===
In October 2009 Nitschke announced his intention to inform people at his workshops where to obtain a long-storage form of sodium pentobarbital (Nembutal) that manufacturers say can be stored for up to fifty years without degrading. Liquid forms of pentobarbital degrade within a few years, while the solid form (a white, crystalline powder) does not. Nitschke intends to advise people on how to reconstitute the pill into liquid form for ingestion if and when it ever becomes appropriate. He said that he sees it as a way of keeping people accurately informed and allowing them to make viable choices. The provision of this information would be consistent with good medical care, in his view.

=== Nitrogen canisters ===
In 2012 Nitschke started a beer-brewing company (Max Dog Brewing) for the purpose of importing nitrogen canisters. Nitschke stated that the gas cylinders can be used for both brewing and, if required, to end life at a later stage in a "peaceful, reliable [and] totally legal" manner. Nitschke said, "[nitrogen] was undetectable even by autopsy, which was important to some people".

An Australian anti-euthanasia campaigner complained to the Australian Health Practitioner Regulation Agency (AHPRA) about the canisters. AHPRA started an investigation but never issued a report, instead deregistering Nitschke in 2015.

Following a 2013 workshop showcasing Nitschke's nitrogen gas product, the AMA's WA branch president and general practitioner, Richard Choong, said that he was strongly opposed to it, regardless of its technical legality, since "any machine that can help you kill yourself can be abused, misused and maliciously used". Nitschke responded that without such information most elderly people who want to end their lives hang themselves, which is "an embarrassment and shame".

In 2014 Australians Valerie Seeger and Claire Parsons used the Max Dog brewing equipment to commit suicide. Police investigated but decided not to prosecute Nitschke after a two and a half year investigation.

Nitschke, who had previously said he would "not roll over" and cease selling Max Dog nitrogen cylinders, ceased selling them when the police investigation began.

=== Sarco device ===
In 2017, Nitschke invented the 3D-printed suicide capsule, which he named "the Sarco". The Sarco consists of a detachable coffin mounted on a stand containing a nitrogen canister. The first public use of the Sarco by an American woman led to arrests of witnesses and the death of one of the witnesses, Dr Florian Willet.

== Comedian ==
Nitschke began his comedy career at the Edinburgh Fringe Festival in August 2015 with his show Dicing with Dr Death. ThreeWeeks called it "engaging and highly thought-provoking". He performed a newer Australian version of his show, retitled Practising without a License, at the Melbourne International Comedy Festival in April 2016 and again in Darwin in August 2016. The Herald Sun reviewed his performance favorably: "[Nitschke] "presented his case with such measure, warm humour and intelligence that even his puns were excusable".

== Awards and recognition ==
- In 1996, Nitschke received the Rainier Foundation Humanitarian Award
- In 1998, Nitschke was recognised as the Australian Humanist of the Year by the Council of Australian Humanist Societies.
- Nitschke is a nine-time nominee for Australian of the Year (2005, 2006, 2008, 2009, 2010, 2011, 2012, 2013, 2014) and twice a state finalist (2005 & 2006)

== Books ==
Nitschke is the author of three books:

=== Killing Me Softly: Voluntary Euthanasia And The Road To The Peaceful Pill ===
Published 2005. In reviewing the book, bioethicist Michael Cooke wrote "Nitschke's insight has been to recognise that assisted suicide is no longer about compassionate medicine, but about technology. Through his work on the web, he is gradually transforming voluntary euthanasia from a mere philosophy into an open-source internet enterprise."

=== The Peaceful Pill Handbook ===
The Peaceful Pill Handbook print edition was originally published in the U.S. in 2006, written by Nitschke and partner Fiona Stewart; the eHandbook version is updated six times a year. Prohibited or at limited sale in Australia and New Zealand.

In 2008 the on-line version of the handbook was launched. Called The Peaceful Pill eHandbook, it contains video clips on assisted suicide and voluntary euthanasia methods such as barbiturates, over the counter drugs, gases and poisons.

- A German edition of the print book — Die Friedliche Pille — was published in 2011 and is published also online.
- A French edition — La Pilule Paisible — since re-titled Pilule Douce was published in June 2015 and is published also online.
- An Italian edition – La Pillola della Quiete was published in online format in 2017
- A Dutch edition – Handboek De Vredige Pil was published in print and online formats in 2018.

=== Damned If I Do ===
An autobiography (with Peter Corris); published by Melbourne University Press in 2013. Nitschke's personal story from his early days, to his activist student days in Adelaide, to working with Aboriginal land rights groups in Australia's Far North; to his successful campaign to have euthanasia legalised in Australia

== Film and television ==
=== Mademoiselle & the Doctor ===
A 2004 documentary film, Mademoiselle and the Doctor, focused on the quest of a retired Perth professor, Lisette Nigot, a healthy 79-year-old, to seek a successful method of voluntary euthanasia. She sought advice from Nitschke. Nigot took an overdose of medication which she had bought in the United States and died, not long before her 80th birthday. In a note to Nitschke thanking him for his support, she described him as a crusader working for a worthwhile humane cause. "After 80 years of a good life, I have [had] enough of it", she wrote, "I want to stop it before it gets bad."

=== 35 Letters ===
In 2014 Nitschke featured in the documentary 35 Letters about Australian woman Angelique Flowers. Angelique was a young member of Exit International. She was 30 years old when she died of bowel cancer. The film premiered at the Sydney Film Festival in 2014 where it won the Australian Foundation Award.

=== Dignified Departure ===
In 2009 Nitschke helped to promote Dignified Departure, a 13-hour, pay-television program on doctor-assisted suicide in Hong Kong and mainland China. The program aired in October in China on the Family Health channel, run by the official China National Radio.

== See also ==
- Suicide bag
- Euthanasia device
- Terminal illness
- Right to die
- Euthanasia in Australia
- Jack Kevorkian
