= Northern Territory (Self-Government) Act 1978 =

Act of the Parliament of Australia

Parliament of Australia
- Long title: An Act to provide for the Government of the Northern Territory of Australia, and for related purposes
- Citation: Act No. 58 of 1978
- Royal assent: 22 June 1978

Related legislation
- Northern Territory Supreme Court Act 1961
- Status: Current legislation

The Northern Territory (Self-Government) Act 1978 is an Act of the Parliament of Australia that granted limited self-government to the Northern Territory. Although Australian territories can not have Constitutions, the self-government act functions in much the same way as the constitutions of the States.

Before the act was passed, the Northern Territory was governed by the Northern Territory Administration, an arm of the Department of Territories. Legislation passed by the Legislative Assembly can be revoked through amendments to the Northern Territory (Self-Government) Act 1978.

Territory Day is an observance in the territory and on this day, members of the public can use fireworks without a permit or training required.
