= Exit International =

Assisted suicide advocacy group

- Founded: 1997
- Founder: Philip Nitschke
- Purpose: Voluntary euthanasia, assisted suicide
- Location(s): Darwin, Melbourne, Auckland, London, Stroud
- Origins: Voluntary Euthanasia Research Foundation (VERF Inc.)
- Region served: International
- Members: 3,500
- Key people: Philip Nitschke, Fiona Stewart
- Employees: 5
- Website: exitinternational.net

Exit International is an international non-profit organisation advocating legalisation of voluntary euthanasia and assisted suicide. It was previously known as the Voluntary Euthanasia Research Foundation (VERF Inc.).

Exit International was founded by Philip Nitschke in 1997 after the over-turning of the world's first Voluntary Euthanasia law—the Rights of the Terminally Ill (ROTI) Act enacted in the Northern Territory, Australia. During the ROTI Act, Nitschke became the first physician in the world to administer a legal, lethal, voluntary injection.

The organisation had 3,500 members as of 2011. Their average age is 75.

== Activities ==
The Peaceful Pill Handbook, a book setting out information on assisted suicide and voluntary euthanasia, was published by the organisation's US branch in 2006.

In 2011, Exit International unveiled the first pro-euthanasia billboard in Australia on the Hume Highway near Sydney. The plan had previously met with opposition when the Australian Advertising Standards Bureau wrote to Exit International, informing them that the advertisement may be illegal as it would contravene state laws on aiding or abetting suicide. Exit International successfully countered by arguing that the language used on the billboard did not argue for euthanasia, but instead referred only to the public support for the act.

Prior to the billboard, Exit International had developed a pro-voluntary euthanasia television advertisement that was due to screen in 2010. The advertisement was prompted by a The Gruen Transfer segment, where two advertising agencies had been requested to create a pro-euthanasia advertisement to "market the unmarketable". Although the winning entry was not able to be used by Exit International, they employed the successful advertising agency. The resulting advertisement was to screen on 12 September, but was unable to be shown after approval for the advertisement was withdrawn two days prior to screening, legal concerns in regard to the promotion of euthanasia and suicide being cited as the cause.

In 2017, Philip Nitschke announced that Exit International had created a smartphone app that connects to a SCiO infrared spectrometer to allow testing of the purity of Nembutal.

Exit International developed a suicide capsule called Sarco, which was used the first time in 2024 in Switzerland.

On 30 September, 2024 Exit International's Haarlem offices were raided by Dutch police, in connection with an investigation by Swiss authorities after Nitschke's Sarco Pod was used for the first time.

== Exit Action ==
In 2016 Nitschke announced that Exit International would form a subgroup called "Exit Action" that would launch militant direct action campaigns to pressure governments to allow unrestricted adult access to euthanasia. Rather than hope that politicians might take pity and change the law, Exit Action would launch online buyers' clubs for euthanasia drugs, regardless of legislation or permission from the medical profession. Nitschke stated "Exit Action believes that a peaceful death, and access to the best euthanasia drugs, is a right of all competent adults, regardless of sickness or permission from the medical profession."

On 18 January 2018, Exit Action sent out an email describing a suicide method using sodium nitrite and/or sodium azide. The method is said to have been promoted by the Dutch group Cooperative Last Will. In response to an inquiry from Dying With Dignity Victoria, the Dutch Association for Voluntary Euthanasia (NVVE) indicated that there was no proof that death from these compounds is peaceful.

== See also ==
- Euthanasia in Australia
- Euthanasia machine
- Right to die
