= Final Exit Network =

Right to die advocacy group

Final Exit Network, Inc.
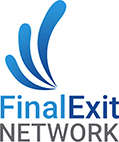
- Predecessor: Hemlock Society
- Formation: 2004; 22 years ago
- Founder: Derek Humphry, Faye Girsh, Ted Goodwin, others
- Tax ID no.: 80-0119137
- Legal status: Active
- Headquarters: Tallahassee, Florida, US (mailing address)
- President: Brian Ruder
- Website: finalexitnetwork.org

Final Exit Network, Inc. (FEN) is an American 501(c)(3) nonprofit right to die advocacy group incorporated under Florida law. It holds that mentally competent adults who suffer from a terminal illness, intractable pain, or irreversible physical (though not necessarily terminal) conditions have a right to voluntarily end their lives. In cases deemed valid, Final Exit Network arranges what it refers to as "self deliverances". Typically, the network assigns two "exit guides" to a client and are present when they die, but the network states, and has proven in court, that it does not provide physical assistance in anyone's death; rather, their role is that of compassionate advisors and witnesses.

Final Exit Network was founded in 2004 by former members of the Hemlock Society, including that organization's co-founders, Derek Humphry and Dr. Faye Girsh. It was named after Humphry's 1991 book of the same name. It is a member of the World Federation of Right to Die Societies.

The organization has occasionally been the subject of controversy and criticism due to its methodology. It favors the inhalation of inert gasses such as helium or nitrogen in conjunction with an "exit hood".

Final Exit Network and individual members have been prosecuted in Arizona, Georgia, and Minnesota. The defenses have largely centered around what constitutes aiding or assisting in suicides. The defendants conceded that while volunteer exit guides give their clients information about how to ensure a swift, pain-free death, they do not physically take part in the suicides, and they maintain that prohibitions against informing clients how to take their lives violate the free speech clause of the First Amendment in the Bill of Rights. The Minnesota case resulted in the first and only conviction of either Final Exit Network or any of its personnel. In the Minnesota trial, it was established that Final Exit Network personnel did not provide any physical assistance in the "suicide" of the "victim." The State openly acknowledged that the corporation (and only the corporation) was convicted solely for communicating "words" that "enabled" a suicide, not for any physical conduct. For its sentence, the corporation was ordered to pay $30,000 in fines and $2,975.63 in restitution. The Minnesota Court of Appeal affirmed the corporation's conviction in December 2016 (confirming there was no physical assistance but rejecting Final Exit Network's free speech argument); the Supreme Court of Minnesota declined to review the conviction in March 2017, and the United States Supreme Court denied certiorari review in October 2017.

== History ==
The Final Exit Network traces its history to the Hemlock Society. It was founded in 1980 primarily by British-born American journalist and author Derek Humphry, his late wife Ann Wickett Humphry, Canadian former Presbyterian minister-turned-skeptic Gerald A. Larue, and psychologist Dr. Faye Girsh. However, in the early 2000s, a faction decided they did not like the Hemlock name. In 2003, the national organization renamed itself End of Life Choices. They later merged with the Compassion in Dying Federation to become Compassion & Choices. Before the merger, Derek Humphry, Faye Girsh, and others founded the Final Exit Network. Where Compassion & Choices' focus is on legislative reform and advocating for and law change, the Final Exit Network concerns itself with what it believes to be the immediate issue of self-deliverance.

== Exit guides ==
Typically, clients' only person-to-person contact with the Final Exit Network is through "exit guides", who are volunteers assigned by case coordinators to meet with clients and attend the death events.

As of 2016, the Network had about 30 guides. Guides provide services including companionship during death, education, advice regarding the discovery of remains and facilitation of conversations with friends and family. Before an applicant is approved for the Final Exit Network's services, a guide visits the applicant's home and conducts an interview with her or him and any family involved to assess if a voluntary and informed choice has been made by the applicant regarding self-deliverance.

In the Minnesota case of Doreen Dunn, the attendant exit guides were determined by the state to have removed the equipment with which she had ended her life.

== Notable legal cases ==
The Final Exit Network and several members have been defendants in three notable prosecutions: the April 12, 2007 death of Jana Van Voorhis of Phoenix, Arizona; the May 30, 2007 death of Doreen Dunn of Apple Valley, Minnesota; and the June 20, 2008 death of John Celmer of Cumming, Georgia.

=== Jana Van Voorhis ===
Jana Van Voorhis was a 58-year-old Phoenix, Arizona woman with a history of mental illness whose suicide was allegedly assisted by the Final Exit Network in 2007. She falsely claimed to have a myriad of physical diseases and expressed a belief that she may have had breast cancer. Two members of the Final Exit Network were charged with aiding in a suicide (which is considered manslaughter under Arizona law) and conspiracy to commit manslaughter. Two others were charged only with conspiracy.

In plea bargains, two of the defendants, senior exit guide Wye Hale-Rowe and case coordinator Roberta Massey, each pleaded guilty to one misdemeanor charge of facilitation to commit manslaughter. Both women were elderly; the pleas ensured they would not run any risk of prison sentences. The trial of the other two began on April 4, 2011. After a two-week trial, Final Exit Network's medical director, Dr. Lawrence Egbert, was acquitted. The jury was unable to reach a verdict on the case against exit guide Frank Langsner. Before his retrial, scheduled for August 4, 2011, Langsner accepted a plea bargain on one misdemeanor count of endangerment and was sentenced to one year probation, following which his record would be expunged.

=== John Celmer ===
On February 25, 2009, four members of the Final Exit Network were arrested on charges of assisting the suicide of a cancer patient, John Celmer, of Cumming, Georgia. Those arrested were Ted Goodwin, Claire Blehr, Dr. Lawrence Egbert, and Nicholas Alec Sheridan. Goodwin and Blehr were arrested in a "sting" operation by the Georgia Bureau of Investigation (GBI); Egbert and Sheridan, who were residents of Baltimore, Maryland, were arrested the same day in Baltimore. They and the organization were also indicted on a charge of racketeering. On April 1, 2010, the five defendants pleaded not guilty.

The defendants moved to dismiss the indictment on grounds that the Georgia statute on aiding in a suicide was facially unconstitutional under the First Amendment. In early 2011, the trial court judge entered an order denying the defendants' motion to dismiss the indictment. The judge entered an order authorizing the defendants to appeal this decision before trial and suspending the prosecution until the appeals court's ruling.

On February 6, 2012, the Supreme Court of Georgia unanimously found the Georgia statute against assisting in a suicide unconstitutional in violation of First Amendment free speech provisions, and struck down the statute in its entirety. All the charges against Goodwin, Blehr, Egbert, and Sheridan were therefore dismissed.

=== Doreen Dunn ===
Doreen Nan Dunn was an Apple Valley, Minnesota, woman who had suffered from intense pain since 1996 following a botched medical procedure. Her husband Mark found her dead at home on May 30, 2007. An autopsy concluded that Dunn died of coronary artery disease.

Minnesota authorities were tipped off by the Georgia Bureau of Investigation, years after her death had been officially recorded as a natural death, when Doreen Dunn's name was found among physical evidence.

In May 2012, Final Exit Network was indicted of assisting in the May 30, 2007 death of Doreen Dunn. Four members: then-medical director Dr. Lawrence Egbert, then-case coordinator Roberta Massey, and exit guides Ted Goodwin and Jerry Dincin (Goodwin's successor as president) were also charged individually in the 17-count indictment, which included felony counts of assisting in a suicide and gross misdemeanors of interfering with a death scene.

District Court Judge Karen Asphaug dismissed all charges against Ted Goodwin on March 22, 2013 on grounds that the allegations against him did not constitute a crime. He was the president of Final Exit Network at the time of the Dunn death but was not alleged to have done anything to implicate him in any crime. She also held that the Minnesota law prohibiting advising a suicide was unconstitutional because the language was too broad; she also dismissed a charge of interfering with a death scene. Jerry Dincin died of prostate cancer four days later. On the eve of trial in 2015, the state filed a motion to sever Lawrence Egbert's trial from that of Final Exit Network, Inc. He was granted immunity over his objection.

Dr. Lawrence Egbert testified that he and Jerry Dincin had gone to Dunn's home to be present with her as she terminated her life, then removed the equipment in order to make it appear as if Dunn had died of natural causes. Final Exit Network's attorney, Robert Rivas, acknowledged that Egbert and Dincin were in Dunn's presence when she died, but he asserted that the state (represented by prosecutor Phil Prokopowicz) had no proof that the men physically assisted in her death. In fact, there was no evidence at trial that any Final Exit Network volunteer assisted in Dunn's death or provided the means. Dr. Egbert testified that they did not.

Although there was a Minnesota statute in effect at the time of Dunn's death which prohibited "advising, encouraging, or assisting" in a "suicide", the state Court of Appeals found the statute to be unconstitutional because it violated the defendants' First Amendment-protected right to freedom of speech. The court ruled in fall 2013 that the statute's prohibitions against advising and encouraging a suicide had to be stricken, but it allowed the state to prosecute Final Exit Network for assisting in a suicide. In an unrelated case before the trial, the Supreme Court of Minnesota ruled that "speech" that "enables" a suicide, standing alone, may constitute a crime under the Minnesota law.

On May 14, 2015, a jury convicted Final Exit Network Inc. of assisting Doreen Dunn's suicide by "speech" that "enabled" the suicide and interfering with the death scene. It marked the first felony conviction against the organization or its personnel and the first time a jury had ever rendered a guilty verdict of any type against the organization or its personnel. It was fined $30,000 by Judge Christian Wilton on the charge of assisting in a suicide and was also required to pay nearly $3,000 in restitution to Dunn's family for funeral expenses. The United States Supreme Court refused to hear the appeal.

In early 2018, after exhausting its appeals from the Minnesota conviction, Final Exit Network, Inc. filed a civil action in the United States District Court for the District of Minnesota seeking a ruling that the Minnesota law under which the corporation was convicted is facially unconstitutional under the First Amendment. After a hearing on the Minnesota attorney general's motion to dismiss the complaint, the judge dismissed Final Exit Network's civil action based on technical jurisdictional grounds.

== Frontline episode ==
The organization and its activities were the subject of a November 13, 2012 episode of the public affairs series Frontline entitled "The Suicide Plan". The episode is available for download on the PBS Frontline website. It was written and directed by Miri Navasky and Karen O'Connor.

It includes interviews with clients, exit guides, and both proponents and opponents of assisted suicide. The Final Exit Network allowed the filmmakers to film part of an exit guide training session. Interviewees include organization founder Derek Humphry, Dr. Timothy E. Quill, and Barbara Coombs Lee of Compassion & Choices. It also features Bruce Brodigan of Massachusetts and Hunt Williams of Connecticut, two men who were charged with assisting in suicides. Brodigan assisted his father George's suicide; charges were later dismissed. He died on April 7, 2012 in Ogunquit, Maine after slipping on rocks and falling into the ocean. Williams assisted his friend John Welles to fatally shoot himself; he was sentenced to one year's probation and accelerated rehabilitation.

In 2016, the legal cases against Final Exit Network were also featured in Season 2, Episode 12 of Vanity Fair Confidential, a series on the Investigation Discovery cable channel.

== See also ==
- Final Exit, book by Derek Humphry
- Assisted suicide
- California End of Life Option Act
- Compassion & Choices
- Death with Dignity National Center
- Dignity in Dying
- Dignitas
- Exit
- Hemlock Society
- World Federation of Right to Die Societies
