= Voluntary euthanasia =

Ending a person's life at their own request

Voluntary euthanasia is the purposeful ending of another person's life at their request, in order to relieve them of suffering. Voluntary euthanasia and physician-assisted suicide (PAS) have been the focus of intense debate in the 21st century, surrounding the idea of a right to die. Some forms of voluntary euthanasia are legal in Australia, Belgium, Canada, Colombia, Luxembourg, the Netherlands, New Zealand, Switzerland, Spain and Uruguay.

Voluntary refusal of food and fluids (VRFF), also called voluntarily stopping eating and drinking (VSED) or patient refusal of nutrition and hydration (PRNH), will similarly result in death. Some authors classify this voluntary action as a form of passive euthanasia, while others treat it separately because it is treated differently from legal point of view, and often perceived as a more ethical option. VRFF is sometimes suggested as a legal alternative to euthanasia in jurisdictions disallowing euthanasia.

== Assisted suicide ==
Assisted suicide is a practice in which a person receives assistance in bringing about their death, typically people suffering from a severe physical illness, in which the final step in the process is actively performed by the person concerned. In physician-assisted suicide (also called physician aid-in-dying or PAD) a physician knowingly provides a competent but suffering patient, upon the patient's request, with the means by which the patient intends to end his or her own life. Assisted suicide is contrasted with "active euthanasia" when the difference between providing the means and actively administering lethal medicine is considered important. For example, Swiss law allows assisted suicide while all forms of active euthanasia (like lethal injection) remain prohibited.

== History ==
Hippocrates mentions euthanasia in the Hippocratic Oath, which was written between 400 and 300 BC. The original Oath states: "To please no one will I prescribe a deadly drug nor give advice which may cause his death." Despite this, the ancient Greeks and Romans generally did not believe that life needed to be preserved at any cost and were, in consequence, tolerant of suicide in cases where no relief could be offered to the dying or, in the case of the Stoics and Epicureans, where a person no longer cared for his life.

English Common Law from the 14th century until the middle of the last century made suicide a criminal act in England and Wales. Assisting others to kill themselves remains illegal in that jurisdiction. However, in the 16th century, Thomas More, considered a saint by Roman Catholics, described a utopian community and envisaged such a community as one that would facilitate the death of those whose lives had become burdensome as a result of "torturing and lingering pain", see Utopia (More book) § Interpretation.

=== Modern ===
Since the 19th century, euthanasia has sparked intermittent debates and activism in Europe and the Americas. According to medical historian Ezekiel Emanuel, it was the availability of anesthesia that ushered in the modern era of euthanasia. In 1828, the first known anti-euthanasia law in the United States was passed in the state of New York, with many other localities and states following suit over a period of several years. After the Civil War, voluntary euthanasia was promoted by advocates, including some doctors. Support peaked around the start of the 20th century in the US and then grew again in the 1930s.

In an article in the Bulletin of the History of Medicine, Brown University historian Jacob M. Appel documented extensive political debate over legislation to legalize physician-assisted suicide in both Iowa and Ohio in 1906. Appel indicates social activist Anna Sophina Hall, a wealthy heiress who had watched her mother die of liver cancer, was the driving force behind this movement. According to historian Ian Dowbiggin, leading public figures, including Clarence Darrow and Jack London, advocated for the legalization of euthanasia.

In 1937, doctor-assisted euthanasia was declared legal in Switzerland as long as the doctor ending the life had nothing to gain. During this same era, US courts tackled cases involving critically ill people who requested physician assistance in dying as well as "mercy killings", such as by parents of their severely disabled children.

=== Post War ===
During the post-war period, prominent proponents of euthanasia included Glanville Williams (The Sanctity of Life and the Criminal Law) and clergyman Joseph Fletcher ("Morals and medicine"). By the 1960s, advocacy for a right-to-die approach to voluntary euthanasia increased.

==== India ====
Since March 2018, passive euthanasia is legal in India under strict guidelines. Patients must consent through a living will, and must be either terminally ill or in a vegetative state.

==== Australia ====
In 1996, the world's first euthanasia legislation, the Rights of the Terminally Ill Act 1996, was passed in the Northern Territory of Australia. Four patients died through assisted suicide under the Act, using a device designed by Dr Philip Nitschke. The legislation was overturned by Australia's Federal Parliament in 1997. In response to the overturning of the Act, Nitschke founded Exit International. In 2009, an Australian quadriplegic was granted the right to refuse sustenance and be allowed to die. The Supreme Court of Western Australia ruled that it was up to Christian Rossiter, aged 49, to decide if he was to continue to receive medical care (tube feeding) and that his carers had to abide by his wishes. Chief Justice Wayne Martin also stipulated that his carers, Brightwater Care, would not be held criminally responsible for following his instructions. Rossiter died on 21 September 2009 following a chest infection.

Voluntary assisted dying schemes have been in effect in the following states; Victoria since 19 June 2019, Western Australia since 1 July 2021, Tasmania since 23 October 2022, Queensland since 1 January 2023, and South Australia since 31 January 2023. New South Wales was the final state to pass legislation for assisted dying in May 2022, which went into effect on 28 November 2023.

==== New Zealand ====
In New Zealand's 2020 general election the country included a binding referendum asking voters if the End of Life Choice Act 2019 should pass. The Act would legalise voluntary euthanasia for patients with a terminal illness and less than six months left to live if approved by two doctors. New Zealand is the first country to put euthanasia legalisation to a referendum. On 17 October 2020, 65.91% of voters supported the passing of the act; a majority. On 21 November 2021, the act was put into place.

==== Colombia ====
On 20 May 1997, the Constitutional Court of Colombia decriminalised piety homicide, for terminally ill patients, stating that "the medical author cannot be held responsible for the assisted suicide of a terminally ill patient" and urged Congress to regulate euthanasia "in the shortest time possible".

On 15 December 2014, the Constitutional Court had given the Ministry of Health and Social Protection 30 days to publish guidelines for the healthcare sector to use in order to guarantee terminated ill patients, with the wish to undergo euthanasia, their right to a dignified death.

On 7 January 2022, Victor Escobar became the first person to undergo voluntary euthanasia without a terminal illness in the country; he had been suffering from chronic obstructive pulmonary disease. Voluntary euthanasia had been legalised in Colombia for people who did not have a terminal illness in July 2021.

==== Europe ====
In 1957 in Britain, Mr Justice Devlin ruled in the trial of Dr John Bodkin Adams that causing death through the administration of lethal drugs to a patient, if the intention is solely to alleviate pain, is not considered murder even if death is a potential or even likely outcome. In 1993, the Netherlands decriminalized doctor-assisted suicide, and in 2002, restrictions were loosened. During that year, physician-assisted suicide was approved in Belgium. Belgium's at the time most famous author Hugo Claus, suffering from Alzheimer's disease, was among those that asked for euthanasia. He died in March 2008, assisted by an Antwerp doctor.

==== United States ====
A key turning point in the debate over voluntary euthanasia (and physician assisted dying), at least in the United States, was the public furor over the Karen Ann Quinlan case. The Quinlan case paved the way for legal protection of voluntary passive euthanasia. In 1977, California legalized living wills and other states soon followed suit.

In 1980 the Hemlock Society USA was founded in Santa Monica by Derek Humphry. It was the first group in the United States to provide information to the terminally ill in case they wanted a hastened death. Hemlock also campaigned and partially financed drives to reform the law. In 2003 Hemlock was merged with End of Life Choices, which changed its name to Compassion and Choices.

In 1990, Dr. Jack Kevorkian, a Michigan physician, became famous for educating and assisting people in committing physician-assisted suicide, which resulted in a Michigan law against the practice in 1992. Kevorkian was tried and convicted in 1999 for a murder displayed on television. Also in 1990, the Supreme Court approved the use of non-active euthanasia.

In 1994, Oregon voters approved the Death with Dignity Act, permitting doctors to assist terminal patients with six months or less to live to end their lives. The U.S. Supreme Court allowed such laws in 1997. The Bush administration failed in its attempt to use drug law to stop Oregon in 2001, in the case Gonzales v. Oregon.

In 2005, amid U.S. government roadblocks and controversy, Terri Schiavo, a Floridian who had been in a vegetative state since 1990, had her feeding tube removed. Her husband had won the right to take her off life support, which he claimed she would want but was difficult to confirm as she had no living will and the rest of her family claimed otherwise.

In November 2008, Washington Initiative 1000 made Washington the second U.S. state to legalize physician-assisted suicide.

==== China and Hong Kong ====
Euthanasia is a criminal offense in China. For example, in Shanghai a 67-year-old man was sentenced to five years in prison when he euthanized his 92-year-old mother when she emerged from a hospital procedure only able to move one finger and one toe. The sentence was considered lenient because he had displayed filial piety toward his mother.

While active euthanasia remains illegal in China, it is gaining increasing acceptance among doctors and the general populace.

Medical practitioners in China support euthanasia laws. A 2006 research emphasised that studies in the 1990s revealed a substantial surge in support for euthanasia, particularly among medical personnel. This is corroborated by a poll conducted by the Chinese Academy of Medical Sciences, which found that 95% of medical staffs approved of the act of euthanasia.

Chinese culture, with its emphasis on filial piety and a taboo surrounding discussions of death, poses significant obstacles to the development of euthanasia. The concept of euthanasia is often seen as pessimistic in this cultural context. However, Buddhism, the predominant religion in China, views euthanasia as a means to achieve a peaceful and suffering-free death, making it more acceptable to some.

In Hong Kong, support for euthanasia among the general public is higher among those who put less importance on religious belief, those who are non-Christian, those who have higher family incomes, those who have more experience in taking care of terminally ill family members, and those who are older.

==== Canada ====
Legislation in Canada is actively evolving and debated. In 2016, Canadian parliament passed legislation allowing eligible adults to request medical assistance in dying (MAiD). Legal access to MAiD was initially limited to persons whose death was "reasonable foreseeable", however the law was amended in 2021 to include persons who had a grievous, irremediable and irreversible medical condition, even if it is not fatal or terminal. An exclusion currently exists for persons whose sole underlying condition is a mental illness.

== Arguments for and against ==
Since World War II, the debate over euthanasia in Western countries has centered on voluntary euthanasia within regulated health care systems. In some cases, judicial decisions, legislation, and regulations have made voluntary euthanasia an explicit option for patients and their guardians.

Proponents of voluntary euthanasia emphasize that choice is a fundamental principle for liberal democracies and free market systems. The pain and suffering a person feels during a disease, even with pain relievers, can be incomprehensible to a person who has not gone through it. Even without considering the physical pain, it is often difficult for patients to overcome the emotional pain of losing their independence. Those who witness others die are "particularly convinced" that the law should be changed to allow assisted death.

Critics argue that voluntary euthanasia could unduly compromise the professional roles of health care employees, especially doctors. They point out that European physicians of previous centuries traditionally swore some variation of the Hippocratic Oath, which in its ancient form excluded euthanasia: "To please no one will I prescribe a deadly drug nor give advice which may cause his death." However, since the 1970s, this oath has largely fallen out of use.

Some people, including many Christians, consider euthanasia of some or all types to be morally unacceptable. This view usually treats euthanasia to be a type of murder and voluntary euthanasia as a type of suicide, the morality of which is the subject of active debate.

If there is some reason to believe the cause of a patient's illness or suffering is or will soon be curable, the correct action is sometimes considered to attempt to bring about a cure or engage in palliative care.

Feasibility of implementation: Euthanasia can only be considered voluntary if a patient is mentally competent to make the decision, i.e., has a rational understanding of options and consequences. Competence can be difficult to determine or even define.

Consent under pressure: Given the economic grounds for voluntary euthanasia, critics of voluntary euthanasia are concerned that patients may experience psychological pressure to consent to voluntary euthanasia rather than be a financial burden on their families. Even where health costs are mostly covered by public money, as in most developed countries, voluntary euthanasia critics are concerned that hospital personnel would have an economic incentive to advise or pressure people toward euthanasia consent.

Non-voluntary euthanasia is sometimes cited as one of the possible outcomes of the slippery slope argument, in which it is claimed that permitting voluntary euthanasia to occur will lead to the support and legalization of non-voluntary and involuntary euthanasia.

== Medical ethics ==
Euthanasia brings about many ethical issues regarding a patient's death. Some physicians say euthanasia is a rational choice for competent patients who wish to die to escape unbearable suffering.

Physicians who are in favor of euthanasia state that to keep euthanasia or physician-assisted suicide (PAS) illegal is a violation of patient freedoms. They believe that any competent terminally-ill patient should have the right to choose death or refuse life-saving treatment. Suicide and assistance from their physician is seen as the only option those patients have. With the suffering and the knowledge from the doctor, this may also suggest that PAS is a humane answer to the excruciating pain.

An argument against PAS is the violation of the Hippocratic oath that some doctors take. The Hippocratic oath states: "I will not give a lethal drug to anyone if I am asked, nor will I advise such a plan."

Another reason for prohibiting PAS and euthanasia is the option of abusing PAS if it were to become legal. Poor or uninsured patients may not have the money or no access to proper care will have limited options, and they could be pressured toward assisted death.

== Legality ==
During the 20th century, efforts to change government policies on euthanasia have met limited success in Western countries. Euthanasia policies have also been developed by a variety of NGOs, most notably medical associations and advocacy organisations.

=== Australia ===
There are a range of eligibility requirements which must be satisfied before a patient can receive VAD treatment. Those that are deemed ineligible are required to wait months for care through the public or private health system and at times at their own financial costs. Furthermore, according to The RAGCP more than $38 billion is spent on people with chronic health conditions a year.

Examples of health conditions that require further assessment before granting the VAD procedure include, respiratory diseases such as cardiovascular disease which is a common cause of death among people over the age of 65. Debilitating chronic pain and disease is heavily assessed when considering patients for assisted dying and for people over the age of 65, even if several medical conditions are present, it does not mean the person is eligible for this procedure. Poor mental health, geriatric syndromes, falls, delirium are underlying conditions that have the potential to exarate one’s pain and suffering in this age group, this also does not guarantee access to assisted dying.

Chronic and acute conditions are common amongst elderly Australians that can range from mild to debilitating pain levels, limiting physical abilities, and taking large mental tolls on individuals. Regardless of personal choice and the complexity of health and medical issues, medical professionals can object to Voluntary Assisted Dying at any point regardless of eligibility should they feel it necessary.

== Religion ==
There are many different religious views on the issue of voluntary euthanasia, although many moral theologians are critical of the procedure.

== Protocols ==
Euthanasia can be accomplished either through an oral, intravenous, or intramuscular administration of drugs, or by oxygen deprivation (anoxia), as in some euthanasia machines. In individuals who are incapable of swallowing lethal doses of medication, an intravenous route is preferred, because it is the most reliable and rapid way to accomplish euthanasia. The following is a Dutch protocol for parenteral (intravenous) administration to obtain euthanasia:

A coma is first induced by intravenous administration of 20 mg/kg sodium thiopental (Nesdonal) in a small volume (10 ml physiological saline). Then a triple intravenous dose of a non-depolarizing neuromuscular muscle relaxant is given, such as 20 mg pancuronium bromide (Pavulon) or 20 mg vecuronium bromide (Norcuron). The muscle relaxant should preferably be given intravenously, in order to ensure optimal availability. Only for pancuronium bromide (Pavulon) are there substantial indications that the agent may also be given intramuscularly in a dosage of 40 mg.

In other jurisdictions (such as Australia and New Zealand), voluntary assisted dying uses 30 mL oral suspensions containing pentobarbital and an anti-emetic to induce a coma leading to respiratory arrest. However, if the person is too ill to administer the medication themselves, a typical surgical anesthesia induction is performed (midazolam + propofol) and then once a coma is achieved, pancuronium or vecuronium is used to paralyse the diaphragm and induce respiratory arrest.

With regards to voluntary euthanasia, many people argue that 'equal access' should apply to access to suicide as well, so therefore disabled people who cannot kill themselves should have access to voluntary euthanasia.

== In popular culture and the arts ==
Apart from The Old Law, a 17th-century tragicomedy written by Thomas Middleton, William Rowley, and Philip Massinger, one of the early books to deal with euthanasia in a fictional context is Anthony Trollope's 1882 dystopian novel, The Fixed Period. Ricarda Huch's novel The Deruga Case (1917) is about a physician who is acquitted after performing euthanasia on his dying ex-wife.

"Quality of Mercy" in The Prosecution Rests is a fable exploring the facets of aging, Alzheimer's disease, and euthanasia. The story line makes no judgement but frees the reader to decide.

The plot of Christopher Buckley's 2007 novel Boomsday involves the use of 'voluntary euthanasia' of seniors as a political ploy to stave off the insolvency of social security as more and more of the aging US population reaches retirement age.

The films Children of Men and Soylent Green depict instances of government-sponsored euthanasia in order to strengthen their dystopian themes. The protagonist of the film Johnny Got His Gun is a brutally mutilated war veteran whose request for euthanasia furthers the work's anti-war message. The recent films Mar Adentro and Million Dollar Baby argue more directly in favor of euthanasia by illustrating the suffering of their protagonists. These films have provoked debate and controversy in their home countries of Spain and the United States respectively.

In March 2010, the PBS Frontline TV program in the United States showed a documentary called "The Suicide Tourist" which told the story of Professor Craig Ewert, his family, and the Swiss group Dignitas, and their decision to help him commit assisted suicide in Switzerland after he was diagnosed and suffering with ALS (Lou Gehrig's Disease).

Thrash metal band Megadeth's 1994 album Youthanasia (the title is a pun on euthanasia) implies that society is euthanizing its youth.

The documentary film How to Die in Oregon follows the lives of select terminally ill individuals who weigh the options of continuing to live and euthanasia. This film employs emotional appeal to the audience on the controversial topic of voluntary euthanasia.

In the House episode "Known Unknowns", Dr. Wilson plans to deliver a speech at a medical conference in which he admits to having euthanized a terminally ill patient. Ultimately, Dr. House delivers the speech using a false identity. In another episode, "The Dig", Dr. Hadley ("Thirteen") reveals that she euthanized her brother who was suffering from Huntington's disease. After learning that Thirteen herself will eventually develop Huntington's, House offers to euthanize her once she is in the advanced stages of the disease.

The 2017 TV program Mary Kills People follows a doctor illegally performing assisted suicides as a side business.

== See also ==
- Arthur Koestler, author, vice-president of EXIT (now the Voluntary Euthanasia Society).
- Bertrand Dawson, 1st Viscount Dawson of Penn – physician to George V, to whom he gave a lethal injection.
- Brittany Maynard
- Chantal Sébire
- George Exoo
- Derek Humphry – Founder of the Hemlock Society, President of ERGO, past-president of the World Federation of Right to Die Societies and author of Final Exit.
- Diane Pretty
- Dignitas (euthanasia group in Switzerland)
- Dr. Death (book by Jonathan Kellerman)
- Euthanasia device, a DIY option for individuals
- Euthanasia: Opposing Viewpoints (2000), listing key sources in an anthology
- Exit (Right-to-Die Organization)
- Final Exit (book)
- Futile medical care
- International Task Force on Euthanasia and Assisted Suicide
- Jack Kevorkian
- John Bodkin Adams, Eastbourne, England doctor, tried for murder in 1957 but claimed euthanasia. Acquitted.
- Kaishakunin – Assists in the Japanese ritual seppuku (suicide)
- Karen Ann Quinlan case and Terri Schiavo case – Cases of persistent vegetative state
- Killick Millard – Founder of the Voluntary Euthanasia Legalisation Society in Great Britain
- Peter Singer – bioethicist, utilitarian
- Philip Nitschke
- Prayopavesa
- Principle of double effect
- Right to die
- Sarco pod
- Self-determination
- Self-ownership
- Senicide
- Suicide tourism
- Terminal sedation
- Terry Wallis
- Ubasute - The concept of an infirm or elderly relative sacrificing themselves in feudal Japan so as not to be a burden on the younger generations.

== Bibliography ==
- Giorgio Agamben (1998). Homo sacer: sovereign power and bare life. Translated by Daniel Heller-Roazen. Stanford, Calif: Stanford University Press. ISBN 978-0-8047-3218-5.
- Appel, Jacob (2007). "A Suicide Right for the Mentally Ill? A Swiss Case Opens a New Debate". Hastings Center Report. 37 (3): 21–23. doi:10.1353/hcr.2007.0035. PMID 17649899. S2CID 28038414.
- Battin, Margaret P., Rhodes, Rosamond, and Silvers, Anita, eds. Physician assisted suicide: expanding the debate. NY: Routledge, 1998.
- Brock, Dan. Life and Death Cambridge University Press, 1993.
- Raphael Cohen-Almagor (2001). The right to die with dignity: an argument in ethics, medicine, and law. New Brunswick, N.J: Rutgers University Press. ISBN 978-0-8135-2986-8.
- Dworkin, R. M. Life's Dominion: An Argument About Abortion, Euthanasia, and Individual Freedom. New York: Knopf, 1993.
- Emanuel, Ezekiel J. 2004. "The history of euthanasia debates in the United States and Britain" in Death and dying: a reader, edited by T. A. Shannon. Lanham, MD: Rowman & Littlefield Publishers.
- Fletcher, Joseph F. 1954. Morals and medicine; the moral problems of: the patient's right to know the truth, contraception, artificial insemination, sterilization, euthanasia. Princeton, N.J.K.: Princeton University Press.
- Dennis J. Horan; David Mall, eds. (1977). Death, dying, and euthanasia. Frederick, MD: University Publications of America. ISBN 978-0-89093-139-4.
- Humphry, Derek; Wickett, Ann (1986). The Right to Die: Understanding Euthanasia (1st ed.). New York, NY: Harper & Row, Publishers, Inc. ISBN 978-0060155780. LCCN 85-45737. OCLC 12942139.
- Humphry, Derek (26 November 2002). Final Exit: The Practicalities of Self-Deliverance and Assisted Suicide for the Dying (3rd ed.). New York, NY: Delta Trade Paperback. ISBN 978-0385336536. LCCN 2002-019403. OCLC 49247323.
- Kamisar, Yale. 1977. Some non-religious views against proposed 'mercy-killing' legislation. In Death, dying, and euthanasia, edited by D. J. Horan and D. Mall. Washington: University Publications of America. Original edition, Minnesota Law Review 42:6 (May 1958).
- Kelly, Gerald. "The duty of using artificial means of preserving life" in Theological Studies (11:203–220), 1950.
- Kopelman, Loretta M., deVille, Kenneth A., eds. Physician-assisted suicide: What are the issues? Dordrecht: Kluwer Academic Publishers, 2001. (E.g., Engelhardt on secular bioethics)
- Magnusson, Roger S. "The sanctity of life and the right to die: social and jurisprudential aspects of the euthanasia debate in Australia and the United States" in Pacific Rim Law & Policy Journal (6:1), January 1997.
- Palmer, "Dr. Adams' Trial for Murder" in The Criminal Law Review. (Reporting on R. v. Adams with Devlin J. at 375f.) 365–377, 1957.
- Panicola, Michael. 2004. Catholic teaching on prolonging life: setting the record straight. In Death and dying: a reader, edited by T. A. Shannon. Lanham, MD: Rowman & Littlefield Publishers.
- Paterson, Craig, "A History of Ideas Concerning Suicide, Assisted Suicide and Euthanasia" (2005). Available at SSRN: http://ssrn.com/abstract=1029229
- Paterson, Craig. Assisted Suicide and Euthanasia: A Natural Law Ethics Approach. Aldershot, Hampshire: Ashgate, 2008.
- PCSEPMBBR, United States. President's Commission for the Study of Ethical Problems in Medicine and Biomedical and Behavioral Research. 1983. Deciding to forego life-sustaining treatment: a report on the ethical, medical, and legal issues in treatment decisions. Washington, DC: President's Commission for the Study of Ethical Problems in Medicine and Biomedical and Behavioral Research: For sale by the Supt. of Docs. U.S. G.P.O.
- Rachels, James. The End of Life: Euthanasia and Morality. New York: Oxford University Press, 1986.
- Robertson, John. 1977. Involuntary euthanasia of defective newborns: a legal analysis. In Death, dying, and euthanasia, edited by D. J. Horan and D. Mall. Washington: University Publications of America. Original edition, Stanford Law Review 27 (1975) 213–269.
- Sacred congregation for the doctrine of the faith. 1980. The declaration on euthanasia. Vatican City: The Vatican.
- Stone, T. Howard, and Winslade, William J. "Physician-assisted suicide and euthanasia in the United States" in Journal of Legal Medicine (16:481–507), December 1995.
- Tassano, Fabian. The Power of Life or Death: Medical Coercion and the Euthanasia Debate. Foreword by Thomas Szasz, MD. London: Duckworth, 1995. Oxford: Oxford Forum, 1999.
