= The Peaceful Pill Handbook =

2006 book by Philip Nitschke and Fiona Stewart

- Australian cover
- Author: Philip Nitschke and Fiona Stewart
- Language: English
- Subject: Euthanasia
- Publisher: Exit International US
- Publication date: July 1, 2006
- Publication place: United States
- Media type: Print and Digital
- Pages: 214
- ISBN: 0-9788788-2-5
- OCLC: 245542475
- Website: http://www.peacefulpillhandbook.com

The Peaceful Pill Handbook is a book that provides information on assisted suicide and voluntary euthanasia. Written by the Australian euthanasia campaigner and former physician Philip Nitschke and author Fiona Stewart, it was originally published in the U.S. in 2006. A German edition of the print book—Die Friedliche Pille—was published in 2011. A French edition—La Pilule Paisible—was published in June 2015. An Italian edition—La pillola della quiete—was published in 2018. A Dutch edition—De vredige pil—was published in 2018.

In 2008, the online handbook—The Peaceful Pill eHandbook—was launched, containing video clips on assisted suicide and voluntary euthanasia methods and related issues. The eHandbook is updated bimonthly.

== Content ==
The book is primarily intended for seniors, people who are seriously ill, and their families and friends. It is also a resource guide for those working in public health and elderly care. The book rates more than a dozen methods of euthanasia according to reliability and peacefulness scales.

Strategies covered by the books include: the use of gases such as nitrogen, poisons such as carbon monoxide, prescription drugs such as insulin and the opiates, and former prescription drugs such as barbiturates, namely pentobarbital. The book details lawful means of obtaining and administering the drugs, and other peripheral issues such as drug storage, shelf life and disposal. The Swiss assisted suicide services are also covered in detail, as are issues such as the writing of wills, advance directives, and issues of determining decision-making capacity.

One of the more controversial aspects of the book is its coverage of the Internet as a source of drugs. To this end, the authors publish a regular neighbourhood watch that warns about Internet scammers and fraudulent websites.

== Use in suicides ==
The Peaceful Pill Handbook has been used in suicides in many countries, including Australia, Canada, Germany, and the United States. In some of these cases, the handbook was used by non-terminally-ill, young people seeking to take their own lives because of depression.

== Reception ==
Although restricted in New Zealand and Australia, the book is available without restriction on Amazon.com, Amazon.co.uk, and from the peacefulpillhandbook.com website in all available languages.

=== Australia ===
While the book was initially granted an 18+ rating in Australia, this was overturned on appeal from the Australian Attorney-General. In early 2007, the publication was refused classification (RC) by the Classification Board. In 2009, the Australian government included the handbook website in its internet filtering plan known as the Clean Feed.

=== New Zealand ===
In 2008, the Society for Promotion of Community Standards objected to the book's publication. This led to its banning in New Zealand on the grounds that it was an objectionable publication. A short time later, the book was republished in redacted form and is available only if sealed, and an indication of the censorship classification is displayed.

== See also ==
- Final Exit by Derek Humphry
- The Complete Manual of Suicide by Wataru Tsurumi
- Suicide
- Suicide methods
- Euthanasia device
- Jack Kevorkian
