= The Complete Manual of Suicide =

1993 Japanese book by Wataru Tsurumi

- First edition cover
- Author: Wataru Tsurumi
- Original title: 完全自殺マニュアル
- Language: Japanese
- Genre: How-to
- Publication date: 1993
- Publication place: Japan
- Media type: Print
- Pages: 198
- ISBN: 978-4-87233-126-4
- OCLC: 845651040

The Complete Manual of Suicide (完全自殺マニュアル, Kanzen Jisatsu Manyuaru, lit. Complete Suicide Manual) is a Japanese book written by Wataru Tsurumi. He is the writer on the problem of "hardness of living" in Japanese society.

It was first published on July 4, 1993, and sold more than one million copies. In the postscript the author says: "To think that at the worst crucial moment, one can escape from the pain by committing suicide, one can live for the moment easier. So by distributing this book, I want to make this stifling society an easier place to live. That is the goal of this book. And I never intend to encourage readers to commit suicide."

Although this book is a manual, the author explains his philosophy throughout and opposes the social pressure to live strong. In every suicide method, he rates different aspect of suicide such as painfulness, gruesomeness of the body, probability of failure and costs in event of failure, and so on. The fact that one can easily identify the least painful and easiest method of suicide was controversial at the time of the publication.

== The book ==
Since the book was intended to be a manual, the author did not spend too much space on discussing the reasons and philosophy behind suicide, although he does rhetorically pose the question "Why must one live?". Wataru simply lays out the methods of suicide one by one and then analyzes each of them in detail.

This 198-page book provides explicit descriptions and analysis on a wide range of suicide methods such as overdosing, hanging, jumping and carbon monoxide poisoning. The book provides matter-of-fact assessment of each method in terms of the pain it causes, effort of preparation required, the appearance of the body and lethality. It covers 11 suicide methods:

1. Overdosing
2. Hanging
3. Self-defenestration
4. Slashing the wrist and carotid artery
5. Collision
6. Gas poisoning
7. Electrocution
8. Drowning
9. Self-immolation
10. Freezing
11. Miscellaneous

Each chapter begins with a graph assessing the method in question in terms of painfulness, time/effort required, the appearance of the body, trouble/inconvenience to others, impact and deadliness. Each of these matters is rated by 1–5 skulls, with 5 skulls indicating the highest rating.

== Public reaction ==
Because the Japanese criminal code censors only graphical depictions of the sexual organs, this book was not censored by the government. Some prefectures designated the book as "books harmful to youth" (Japanese: 有害図書, romanized: yuugaitosho, lit. 'harmful book'), which restricts the sale of books to minors, while some prefectures, such as Tokyo, decided against doing so. There are many suicides where the book was found along with the body, including several cases of the suicides of junior high school students. The book neither encourages nor discourages suicide, and as well does not tell those considering suicide to seek help, though wordings such as "completely painless" and "marvelous experience" are used to indicate that certain methods are less painful and more fatal than others. Moreover, the book shows that certain popular methods of suicide have very low success rates. For this reason, some argue that since its publication the book has made suicide attempts more fatal. Some attribute Japan's high suicide rate not just to the number of people who attempt suicide but also to the fact that people use more fatal methods, though to what extent the book has contributed to this trend is unknown.

After the intense criticism and debate, the author subsequently published the second book, Our Complete Manual of Suicide (僕達の完全自殺マニュアル, Bokutachi no "Kanzen Jisatsu Manyuaru"), ISBN 978-4-87233-153-0, where he published fan letters and hate mail he had received. This second book somewhat helped shift the public attention to the various reasons some people commit suicide, and the controversy died down eventually. The book is still widely available.

== See also ==
- Euthanasia device
- Final Exit by Derek Humphry
- The Peaceful Pill Handbook by Philip Nitschke
