= Suicide bag =

Euthanasia device using inert gas

A suicide bag, also known as an exit bag or hood, is part of a euthanasia device consisting of a large plastic bag with a drawcord used to die by suicide through inert gas asphyxiation. It is usually used in conjunction with a flow of an inert gas that is lighter or less dense than air, like helium or nitrogen. Continuing to breathe expels carbon dioxide and this prevents the panic, sense of suffocation and struggling before unconsciousness, known as the hypercapnic alarm response caused by the presence of high carbon dioxide concentrations in the blood. This method also makes the direct cause of death difficult to trace if the bag and gas canister are removed before the death is investigated. While asphyxiation by helium can be detected at autopsy, there is currently no test that can detect asphyxiation by nitrogen. For this reason, nitrogen is commonly the preferred choice for people who do not want the cause of death established.

== History ==
Self-administered and assisted suicides by asphyxiation using a plastic bag with helium were first recorded in the 1990s. Since the 2000s, guides have spread on the internet, in print and on video and the frequency of suicides by this method has increased.

The suicide bag with inert gas method was originally developed by John Hofsess and the NuTech group, which consisted of Hofsess, Derek Humphry, engineers and physicians.

In the book Final Exit by Derek Humphry, a suicide bag was described as a large plastic bag with an adjustable velcro strip around the neck. Its use with inert gases was mentioned in the Supplement to Final Exit in 2000.

The euthanasia-rights advocacy group Exit Australia distributed a manufactured version of the bag in Australia in 2002, alarming government officials and anti-abortion groups. The Australian chapter of Right to Life expressed concern that they would be used by vulnerable people.

In 2007, The Vancouver Sun cited Russel Ogden, Canadian criminologist and right-to-die advocate, who said that the combination of a suicide bag and helium was "a method of choice" within the right-to-die movement for people who are terminally ill and that its promotion does not appear to cause an increase in the number of suicides. However, he said that he has no way of knowing if the method was being used by people with terminal illnesses or by people who are mentally ill.

In 2008, Ludwig Minelli, founder of Dignitas, filmed four people committing suicide by helium inhalation. Subsequent to this, the method "has been winning supporters both in the USA and in Europe as a reliable, rapid and painless way to die".

In 2009, Philip Nitschke, founder of voluntary euthanasia organisation Exit International, wrote in a member newsletter that nitrogen has a lower risk of an adverse reaction by the body than helium and is also more available than helium in Australia and New Zealand. Nitschke's organisation sells suicide kits that contain nitrogen tanks and regulators. He promotes the use of nitrogen and suicide bags with lectures and films, such as Doing it with Betty – in which an elderly woman describes how to make a plastic 'exit' bag, and with published materials such as workshop handbooks. Nitschke calls the suicide bag death a "hypoxic death", and likens it to pneumonia, the "old person's friend", where hypoxia occurs because pneumonic inflammation stops the lungs extracting sufficient oxygen from the air, and "a peaceful death often results".

In 2015 author and right-to-die advocate Derek Humphry reported that Worthington Industries, the world's largest manufacturer of disposable helium cylinders, had announced that their helium cylinders will guarantee only 80% helium, with up to 20% air, making them inappropriate for use with a suicide bag in Humphry's opinion.

In many countries it has also become increasingly difficult for private individuals to obtain cylinders of nitrogen for possible use with a suicide bag as suppliers have been alerted to this method and there are few other reasons for a private individual to seek to purchase a cylinder of nitrogen.

Dutch psychiatrist Boudewijn Chabot, in his 2015 book Dignified Dying, calls the suicide bag with inert gas method "rapid, painless and safe".

== Legal issues ==
Selling suicide bags is prohibited in some places. In 2011, the FBI raided a small mail-order business in California, which shut down afterwards. In July 2011, this raid caused Oregon to be the first US state to pass legislation prohibiting the sale of kits containing suicide bags or hoods.

Canadian right-to-die advocates stopped shipping suicide bags to Australia in 2001 when the Australian government announced that it would review their importation. In 2002, the Queensland Police in Australia said that suicide bags did not violate any laws at that time and the Australian federal government said it would look into banning them. Exit Australia gave them away to members upon request; they put warning labels on them, written as "exit bags". No instructions were included, in order to circumvent Australian laws against assisting suicide.

== Mechanism ==
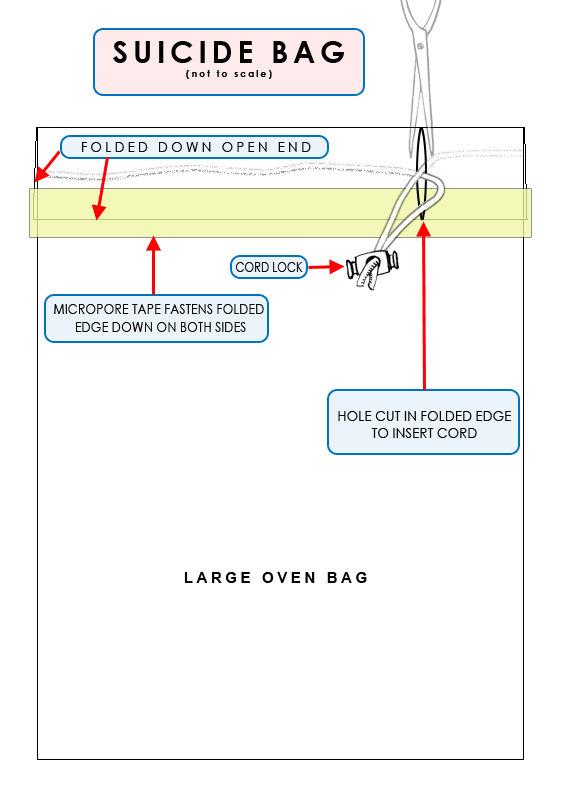
Diagram of a suicide bag; details sourced from the books Final Exit and The Peaceful Pill Handbook

A hypoxic, carbon dioxide-free, metabolically inert gas that is less dense than air is provided for inhalation by confining the continually flowing less dense (than air) gas supply and the head in an impermeable bag which is slightly open at the lower neck, which continuously fills from the closed top down to the slightly open neck. This prevents contamination with oxygen from the surrounding air, and also flushes away any exhaled CO_{2}, minimising the amount of gas required. It will not work with inert gases like argon that are denser/heavier than air as these would just spill out the open neck of the bag and not fill it first from the sealed top downwards. (The same effect could also be reached by flooding any enclosed space with the gas, but much more gas would be needed, and this would be hazardous to a third party entering the space, an effect which is well-known as a cause of industrial fatalities.)

Inhalation of oxygen-deficient or oxygen-free gas not only fails to replenish oxygen used in normal metabolism, but causes the blood passing through the capillaries of the gas exchange regions of the lungs to lose residual oxygen in relation to the concentration difference between the oxygen in the alveolar air and in the blood in the alveolar capillaries. This causes a far quicker drop in blood oxygen level than holding the breath. The deoxygenated blood then passes through the systemic circulation to the vital organs, including the brain, and rapidly lowers oxygen concentrations below the level required to sustain consciousness, and when it is insufficient to keep the heart functioning, cardiac arrest will occur. For the majority of people, an alveolar oxygen tension of less than 30 millimetres of mercury (40 mbar) or 4% by volume at atmospheric pressure is not sufficient to support consciousness.

The urge to breathe, in normal humans, is mainly controlled by blood carbon dioxide concentration and the acidity that it causes. A rise in carbon dioxide concentration caused by the inability to inhale fresh air will cause a strong reflex to breathe, accompanied by increasing distress as the level rises, culminating in panic and a desperate struggle for air. However, if the supplied breathing gas is free of carbon dioxide, the blood carbon dioxide levels will remain low while breathing occurs, and there will be no distress or urge to increase breathing rate, as the sensitivity in normal people to blood oxygen level as a breathing stimulus is very low.

The effect of contamination of the inert gas by air or other source of oxygen is to reduce the effects of oxygen loss and the person exposed may feel weak, tired and confused, but without a strong urge to breathe or the associated respiratory distress. The efficiency of the system for euthanasia requires minimising contamination by oxygen and carbon dioxide. Small amounts of oxygen will not affect the result, but may extend the time taken.

=== Short-term effects ===
Helium and nitrogen are non-toxic and can be breathed with no ill effects over short or long term when oxygen levels are sufficient, and present no health risk to third parties except asphyxiation. The danger lies in that they are undetectable by human senses, and the first warning of their presence in asphyxiant concentrations may be loss of consciousness. Lower concentrations may cause confusion and weakness. Use of a suicide bag in a well ventilated room using either of these gases is unlikely to pose a hazard for other people, and there is no fire hazard.

Propane, butane and natural gas are to varying degrees narcotic, and are a serious fire and explosion hazard, depending on concentration of the gas and of oxygen. They are usually supplied with strong-smelling additives to provide a warning. These additives may be toxic in large doses, but the concentrations which are needed to indicate the presence of the gas are not dangerous over short terms. The unpleasant smell may be a deterrent to more widespread use as a euthanasia agent, but the primary purpose is a warning of fire hazard.

Propane has low toxicity since it is not readily absorbed and is not biologically active. It is heavier than air and may accumulate in low places, particularly if they are poorly ventilated. Non inert gases: Butane is similar to propane, and heavier, and has narcotic effects in large doses. Natural gas is lighter than air and disperses quickly in a well ventilated area.

== Research ==
Suicides using bags or masks and gases are well documented in the literature.

Suicide bags have been used with gases other than inert gases, with varying outcomes. Examples of other gases used are propane-butane, which has narcotic effects, and is commonly adulterated with strong smelling additives to warn of gas leaks, and natural gas.

Suicides using a suicide bag and an inert gas produce no characteristic post-mortem macroscopic or microscopic findings. Forensic death investigations of cause and manner of death may be very difficult when people die by suicide in this manner, provided the apparatus (such as the bag, tank, or tube) is removed by someone after death. Petechiae, which are often considered a marker of asphyxia, are present in only a small minority of cases (3%). Frost reported that of the two cases he studied that featured death from inert gas asphyxiation using a suicide bag, one had "bilateral eyelid petechiae and large amounts of gastric content in the airways and that these findings challenge the assumption that death by this method is painless and without air hunger, as asserted in Final Exit." A review study by Ely and Hirsch (2000) concludes that conjunctival and facial petechiae are the product of purely mechanical vascular phenomena, unrelated to asphyxia or hypoxia, and do not occur unless ligatures were also found around the neck. The authors wrote,

Unless the bag is fastened around the neck by a ligature with sufficient tension to obstruct venous return from the face, in our experience, such persons never have facial or conjunctival petechiae. Persons with tight fastenings around the neck are recognizable instantly by their facial plethora of numerous petechiae. We are aware that some observers may have seen an occasional petechia in rare instances of plastic bag suicide. However, we have not seen detailed descriptions of such observations that permit another person to evaluate the variables that might have produced an isolated petechia in a rare victim. Conversely, in New York City, an average of approximately 15 persons per year accomplish suicide by plastic bag, and we never have observed petechiae in a person who did not tightly fasten the bag around his/her neck

— Ely SF, Hirsch CS, "Asphyxial deaths and petechiae: a review". J. Forensic Sci, (2000)

There are also documented cases of suicide attempts using the suicide bag that failed. A case report study in 2015 discussed the risks associated with failed attempts using this method. The authors wrote, "If the process is interrupted by someone, there is no gas or the tube slips out of the bag, there is a high risk of severe hypoxia of the central nervous system" (in survivors). Brain cells are very sensitive to reduced oxygen levels. Once deprived of oxygen they will begin to die off within five minutes. If hypoxia results in coma, the length of unconsciousness is often indicative of long-term damage. In some cases coma can give the brain an opportunity to heal and regenerate, but, in general, the longer a coma, the greater the likelihood that the person will remain in a vegetative state until death.

== Bioethics ==
Russel Ogden (2002) said that the existence of "how-to" literature involving the suicide bag has been "shown to influence the choice of suicide method but not the overall suicide rate, and that an emerging counterculture of death providers, operating outside of the traditional medicolegal framework of health care, was placing assisted death outside the normative gaze of medicine". In 2010, Ogden and colleagues observed four cases of assisted suicide with helium delivered by face mask. The authors stated that a hood method might be able to play a role in "demedicalising assisted suicide". Ogden views a bag and inert gas as "the quickest way to go; used properly, you're unconscious after the second breath and dead in about 10 minutes".

Clinical psychologist Phillip Kleespies said that Ogden's work calls attention to some of the risks associated with covert assisted suicide using unregulated methods like the suicide bag with inert gas. He does not dispute that the method is "swift, highly lethal and painless", as claimed by Ogden and other right-to-die proponents. However Kleespies feels it is an undignified, impersonal and "hurried" manner of death, which may be used by people who have not had the opportunity for appropriate counseling and that this is largely a result of more dignified methods being made illegal. He concludes by expressing the hope that with improved and more appropriate care during the dying phase of life, there will be less perceived need for these methods of self-deliverance.

A study poses the dilemma for medical ethicists and the general public who "may also want to carefully weigh the unintended adverse consequences of widely disseminated suicide methods likely to appeal to some depressed persons (irrespective of their physical health status or age) against the putative benefits associated with making these methods more widely known and available".

== Characteristics of users ==
Promoters of this suicide method recommend it to terminally ill patients. However, across the world, most people who use suicide bags are physically healthy. Instead of having incurable cancer or other life-threatening physical diseases, most of the users have psychiatric disorders or substance abuse problems that might possibly be addressed through medical and psychological treatment. The demographics of its users varies; in one survey, the method had been used mostly by middle-aged adults in failing health, who were attracted to the relative nonviolence of the method.

This suicide method is also typically used by younger or middle-aged adults, rather than by older adults. In the US, it is more commonly chosen by white males than by women or people of other races.

== See also ==
- Advocacy of suicide
- Charcoal-burning suicide
- Euthanasia device
- Hemlock Society
- Hypercapnia
- Sarco device
