= Orrb =

Wellness device

Overview
- Manufacturer: Tharsus, Engineering: McLaren
- Production: 2002–2019
- Assembly: London, UK
- Designer: Lee McCormack

Body and chassis
- Class: Pod Wellness Device
- Body style: Geometric sphere
- Layout: Single occupant reclining seated configuration
- Platform: Twin wall GRP monocoque
- Doors: Dihedral, 1-door capsule or coupé

Dimensions
- Length: 5 feet 7 in (170.18 cm)
- Width: 3 feet 4 in (101.6 cm)
- Height: 6 feet 4.7 in (194.82 cm)
- Curb weight: 89.81 kg (198 lb)

The Orrb (also known as Oculas or Ovei pod) is a monocoque-structured device fabricated from 100% recyclable glass-fiber reinforced plastic (GFRP). It was originally designed as a relaxation pod for offices, and featured pre-recorded wellness sessions.

== History ==
The Orrb was designed by British designer and innovator Lee McCormack in 2002. In 2005, he worked with McLaren Applied Technologies, producing a prototype called the “Ovei”. The Orrb is equipped with technologies that include surround sound, specific controls for lighting, air quality, and entry and exit.

== Applications ==
McCormack reported in 2005 that he received positive feedback about the device's effectiveness. Orrb has also been used alongside biofeedback therapy to reduce stress among firefighters, and research into in utero hearing.

In 2008, during the CEDIA Expo UK Show, F1 drivers Lewis Hamilton and Damon Hill demonstrated usage of the pods.

The Orrb appeared at the Grand Designs 2009 exhibition at ExCeL London, delivering show information.

The product was commercially released in April 2015.

== See also ==
- Sleep pod – structure to sleep or nap
- Escape pod - safety capsule or craft
- Sarco pod - Euthanasia device
