= Luis Kutner =

American lawyer

- Born: June 9, 1908; Chicago, Illinois
- Died: March 1, 1993 (aged 84); Chicago, Illinois
- Education: University of Chicago Law School, 1927
- Occupations: Lawyer, Author
- Known for: Snitching on Fred Hampton and reporting him to the FBI, leading to Hampton's eventual assassination in Chicago. Development of the living will and advocacy of world habeas corpus

External image
- http://www.corbisimages.com/stock-photo/rights-managed/U1194767INP/attorney-luis-kutner-holding-petition Luis Kutner with petition for United Nations writ of habeas corpus to be filed with the UN Commission on Human Rights on behalf of William N. Oatis, 1952. Corbis Images.

Luis Kutner (June 9, 1908 – March 1, 1993) was a US human rights activist, FBI informant, and lawyer who was on the National Advisory Council of the US branch of Amnesty International during its early years and created the concept of a living will. He was also notable for his advocacy of "world habeas corpus", the development of an international writ of habeas corpus to protect individual human rights. He was a founder of World Habeas Corpus, an organization created to fight for international policies which would protect individuals against unwarranted imprisonment. Kutner's papers are at the Hoover Institution Archives at Stanford University.

== Biography ==
Luis Kutner was born in Chicago to Jewish-Russian immigrants. At the age of 15, he entered the law school of the University of Chicago.

During the late 1940s, Kutner built up his reputation as a human rights lawyer. During his career he also gained the release of over 1,000 people, mainly as they were wrongfully convicted or being held without charge.

Kutner gained national recognition in 1949, when he obtained freedom for a black mechanic from Waukegan, Illinois, James Montgomery, who had served 26 years of a life term sentence for raping an itinerant. A Federal judge described as "a sham" the defendant's 1924 trial in which a vengeful prosecutor withheld vital evidence. He also helped free Hungarian Cardinal József Mindszenty, American fascist poet Ezra Pound, former Congo President Moise Tshombe and represented the Dalai Lama and Tibet. Kutner is widely known as one of the most prominent human-rights attorneys of the twentieth century.

He is also accredited for the first acknowledged federal lawsuit against a prison warden by inmates in 1949. In 1952, Kutner filed a lawsuit on behalf of a Black passenger against Illinois Greyhound Lines, four years prior to the federal Montgomery bus lawsuit Browder v. Gayle.

In 1966, Kutner participated in a lawsuit against George Lincoln Rockwell and the American Nazi Party.

== Intelligence service ==
Declassified records show that Kutner had a history of collusion with the FBI and the CIA. In 1969, he reported Fred Hampton to the FBI in the days leading to Hampton's death at the hands of the Chicago Police. In 1973, he petitioned the CIA for $250k to set up an NGO in Beijing, in return letting the agency "staff it completely with our own people."

== Biographical Chronology ==
1927 J.D., University of Chicago Law School
1930 Admitted to Bar, State of Illinois
1944 Author, The Admiral (biography of George Dewey) (with Laurin Healy)
1948 Author, Fights and Cascades, Moon Splashed, Red Wine and Shadows (poems)
1953 Author, Live in Twelve Minutes (novel) (with W. T. Brannon)
1957 Author, The International Court of Habeas Corpus and the United Nations Writ of Habeas Corpus
1958 Author, World Habeas Corpus: A Proposal for International Court of Habeas Corpus and the United Nations Writ of Habeas Corpus
1961 Co-founded Amnesty International (with Peter Benenson)
1962 Author, World Habeas Corpus
1966 Author, I, the Lawyer
1967 Wrote the first living will
1970 Author, Legal Aspects of Charitable Trusts and Foundations: A Guide for Philanthropoids, The Intelligent Women's Guide to Future Security, also published as How to Be a Wise Widow
1970 Editor, The Human Right to Individual Freedom: A Symposium on World Habeas to Corpus
1972 U.S. congressional nominee for the Nobel Peace Prize
1974 Author, Due Process of Rebellion, How to Be a Wise Widow, and The Trialle of William Shakespeare (three-act play)

== Author of living will ==
Luis Kutner was the first to publish the concept of the living will (which is the oldest form of an advance directive) in 1969. The term living will means that this form of will was to be used while an individual was still alive (but no longer able to make decisions). The term first occurs in the Luis Kutner Papers in a letter of November 15, 1967, in the context of Kutner’s correspondence with the Euthanasia Society of America. Kutner had first addressed the Euthanasia Society in August 1967 in connection with his plans to prepare an international symposium on Euthanasia (“Pro and Con”) which however was never materialized. On December 7, 1967, Kutner hold a speech on “Euthanasia and Due Process of Law” at the Euthanasia Society’s Annual Meeting in New York City. By that time, Kutner’s paper “Due Process of Euthanasia: The Living Will, A Proposal” was ready to be published, but publication was delayed until summer 1969 due to difficulties to find a publisher. In this paper, Kutner showed some sympathy with the propagators of “death on request” (active euthanasia), but stressed that a living will “authorizing mercy killing” would be “contrary to public policy”. Subsequently, Kutner published four more articles about the topic, in which he followed the same line of argumentation. For example, in 1987 he wrote in the University of Detroit Law Review: “The Living Will is a means for the individual to manage his death by protective guidelines and is premised on the informed consent of the person prior to an irreversible coma or a state of being disabled or maimed. It is based on the right of privacy – the individual’s right to self-determination of his body”. The Euthanasia Society of America adopted Kutner's idea and devised a living will document which was distributed among members by the affiliate charity society Euthanasia Educational Fund (which became Euthanasia Educational Council in 1972 and Concern for Dying in 1978). Kutner probably never became a member of the Euthanasia Society of America or one of its successor organisations, and his later attempts to cooperate with them failed.
