= Society for the Right to Die =

American pro-euthanasia organization

The Euthanasia Society of America was founded on January 16, 1938, to promote euthanasia. It was co-founded by Charles Francis Potter and Ann Mitchell. Alice Naumberg (mother of Ruth P. Smith) also helped found the group.

The group initially supported both voluntary and involuntary euthanasia. Many of its early board of directors (including co-founders Potter and Mitchell, Clarence Cook Little, Robert Latou Dickinson and Oscar Riddle), as well as prominent supporters of the movement (such as Clarence Darrow, Sherwood Anderson, Abraham Wolbarst, Madison Grant, William J. Robinson and Willystine Goodsell) were also eugenicists. Many of them supported gassing those considered to have a developmental disability. However, in 1941 Mitchell condemned the Nazi involuntary euthanasia programme, adding: "we are definitely opposed to the illegal, unregulated and surreptitious 'mercy-killings' by individuals, however much we may sympathize with the humane motive which often actuates them".

In 1967, the group helped Luis Kutner promote the first living will in a speech to the Society. In 1974, the group was renamed the Society for the Right to Die and later merged with Concern for Dying, the two becoming Choice in Dying in 1991.
