= Jean's Way =

Book by Derek Humphry

- Jean's Way
- Author: Derek Humphry
- Language: English and 8 languages
- Subjects: Right to die Assisted suicide Voluntary euthanasia
- Publisher: Norris Lane Press
- English publication date: 2003, latest printing
- Media type: paperback and eBook
- Pages: 160
- ISBN: 0-9637280-7-5

Jean's Way (originally subtitled A Love Story), a book by Derek Humphry, is an account of Humphry's terminally ill wife's planned suicide from suffering. The book is his first on the issue of voluntary euthanasia and assisted suicide.

== Overview ==
Derek Humphry, a journalist on the London Sunday Times and author of Because They're Black, published Jean's Way in 1978. The book became a bestseller in the UK, was translated into eight languages, and has been reprinted 17 times.+

The 2003 printing in English by Norris Lane Press (ISBN 0-9637280-7-5) is 160 pages and includes a new full-color jacket and updated preface. The 2003 English edition is available in paperback and eBook formats.

Jean's Way translations have been published in Finland, Norway, Hebrew, Japan, Poland, Spain, Mexico, France, Turkey and Germany.

== Jean Humphry ==
Jean Humphry was born Jean Edna Crane on March 23, 1932, in Hulme (Manchester), UK. Her family moved to Wythenshawe, a Manchester suburb, where Jean received a public school education. In 1951 Miss Crane was appointed 'Miss Wythenshawe', a volunteer task ceremoniously to open fetes, flower shows and exhibitions as the district had no Mayor. On May 4, 1953, Jean married Derek Humphry in Manchester. They had three sons, one adopted. She died March 29, 1975, in Langley Burrell, Wiltshire, as a consequence of breast cancer which had become carcinomatosis.

== Book summary ==
At the time of the publication's first edition, not only was assisted suicide against the law, it was also highly taboo.

Jean Humphry had suffered for more than two years from breast cancer, which spread throughout her whole body, as described in the first nine chapters. She decided it was her time for an assisted death, and proceeded with her plan so that she could die in peace and dignity in her own home rather than in hospital. This was an individual decision; The couple did not know then (1975) about euthanasia and assisted suicide, which later became highly controversial as the right to die issue mushroomed. Living Wills were then just becoming known.

Some nine months earlier, the couple had made a pact at Jean's instigation that she could take her life if she wished if the final weeks were unbearable to her. Jean had stipulated that she would only do it with Derek's agreement.

At Jean's request, Derek secured a lethal overdose from a sympathetic doctor and stored it in a secure place in their home in Wiltshire. When the pain and distress became too great to bear, Jean asked for the drugs so that she could die. When she was ready, Derek mixed the lethal potion into a mug of coffee. After saying, "Goodbye, my love" Jean downed the drink and died within the hour.

In Chapter 10, Is This the Day?, Derek describes her last day before her death.

On publication of the book, British police asked Derek if it was true, and he signed a statement to the effect that it was. But the Director of Public Prosecutions, who has discretion over assisted suicide laws, decided not to prosecute Derek.

== Post publication ==
The popularity of Jean's Way started the movement to legalize assisted suicide as a choice for competent adults at the end of life. (Previously, the movement had concentrated solely on 'voluntary euthanasia' by direct injection.)

Derek founded the Hemlock Society in 1980 to campaign for greater acceptance of justifiable assisted suicide and also wrote the international bestselling book Final Exit.

In 1990, Jean's Way became the basis for a dramatic stage play entitled Is This the Day? written by Vilma Hollingbery. It had its world premiere at the Royal Theatre in Northampton, UK, and had short runs in Germany and the USA.

The book foreshadowed the Oregon Death with Dignity Act, which Derek pioneered in 1986 and as a team player worked for its eventual passage in 1994. In the application of both Oregon law and Swiss law, with legally approved ways of assisting deaths at the end of life, Jean's Way is the method used. In Switzerland it is used by Dignitas and EXIT, the Swiss society for humane dying.

== Bibliography ==
- The Good Death: The New American Search to Reshape the End of Life, Marilyn Webb, Bantam, 1997.
- A Chosen Death: The Dying Confront Assisted Suicide, Lonny Shavelson, Simon & Schuster, 1995.
- "Derek Humphry" in Current Biography, Volume 56, Number 3, March 1995, H. W. Wilson Company.
- "Document 108: Jean's Way" in The Right to Die Debate: A Documentary History, edited by Margaret B. Zucker, Greenwood Press, 1999.
- "Voluntary Euthanasia" in Pro & Con, Walter Isaacson, Puttnam, NY. 1983.
- The Enigma of Suicide, George Howe Colt, Summit Books, NY, 1991.
- The Least Worst Death: The Politics of Dying, Margaret Pabst Battin, OUP, 1994.
- Good Life, Good Death: Memoir, Derek Humphry, Carrel Books, New York 2017

== See also ==
- Assisted suicide
- Euthanasia and the law
