= George Exoo =

American Unitarian Universalist minister

George David Exoo (August 22, 1942 – May 26, 2015) was an American Ohio-born former Unitarian Universalist minister and assisted suicide activist who spent months in jails after he was accused of helping a woman in Ireland kill herself. He became a Unitarian Universalist minister in 1973, but resigned in 2002 because of the Irish legal charges against him. He was originally a Methodist and had a doctorate in music history from University of California, Berkeley.

He began his involvement with assisted suicide after a member of his congregation made remarks about a man he'd counselled who had committed suicide. In 1982 he joined the Hemlock Society and later he joined Final Exit Network. The first suicide he assisted occurred in Pittsburgh, Pennsylvania in 1995. In 2008 he claimed to have assisted in at least 102 other suicides.

== AIDS activist and residency at the New Vrindaban "City of God" ==
Exoo studied under Wilfred Cantwell Smith at Harvard University, and did his doctoral work in religion and society at the Graduate Theological Union. He was ordained a minister by the Unitarian Universalists. In Charleston, South Carolina, where he led a Unitarian congregation, he distributed free condoms to homosexual men in the 1980s at restrooms at South Carolina freeway rest stops. In August 1989, he visited the New Vrindaban Hare Krishna community in Marshall County, West Virginia, and became attracted by the vision of an interfaith community as described by the community's founder, Kirtanananda Swami Bhaktipada. He moved to the community in June 1990, determined to create a hospice for AIDS victims, and in October 1990, along with two other interfaith residents, incorporated his own church, "The Interfaith Friends", a federation of Unitarian-Universalism, Taoism and Quakers. However, by early 1991, he became disturbed by the "totalitarian control by the Swami", and the "lack of integrity, blatant corruption, deceit, theft, and the gross abuse of the mental and physical well being of its own residents." Exoo (and his partner Thomas McGurrin, a former Krishna devotee) left the community and moved to Beckley, West Virginia, where he led a Unitarian congregation. In June 1992, In Pittsburgh magazine published an article by Exoo titled "The City of Fraud" in which he told the tale of betrayal and threatened physical harm he experienced while living at the New Vrindaban "City of God".

== Extradition request from Irish government ==
In January 2002 the Irish authorities wanted Exoo for assisting the suicide of Rosemary Toole. The United States arrested him, but ultimately refused extradition on the grounds that Irish and American law in this area were not compatible. Exoo declined to attend the inquest into Toole's death on legal advice. He stated, however, that it was unlikely he would work with Irish citizens in the future, as he considered it too dangerous.

Although he had supporters, there were concerns within the right-to-die community that Exoo assisted suicides of individuals who did not have terminal or debilitating illness.

== Coverage by Jon Ronson ==
Jon Ronson profiled him in Channel 4 documentary Reverend Death. Exoo claimed to have helped 102 people commit suicide, although Jon Ronson claims that most of Exoo's clients, including Toole, were suffering from depression or psychosomatic illnesses, not terminal illnesses.

== Property in Gastonia ==
Exoo bought a property in Gastonia, North Carolina, in 2007, with the intent of using part of it as a place for terminally ill patients to end their lives.

== Death ==
Exoo died May 26, 2015, at a hospice in Beckley, West Virginia, at the age of 72.

== See also ==
- Euthanasia
- Jack Kevorkian
- Philip Nitschke
