= Euthanasia Coaster =

Hypothetical passenger-killing ride

- Track profile of the Euthanasia Coaster, showing its 500 m (1,600 ft) lift hill and seven clothoid inversions

General statistics
- Type: Steel
- Designer: Julijonas Urbonas
- Model: Exa coaster
- Lift/launch system: Cable lift hill
- Height: 500 m (1,600 ft)
- Length: 7,544 m (24,751 ft)
- Speed: 360 km/h (220 mph)
- Inversions: 7
- Duration: 3:20
- G-force: 10

The Euthanasia Coaster is a hypothetical steel roller coaster and euthanasia device designed with the sole purpose of killing its passengers. The concept was conceived in 2010 and made into a scale model by Lithuanian artist Julijonas Urbonas, a PhD candidate at the Royal College of Art in London.

Urbonas, who had formerly been an amusement park employee, stated that the goal of his concept roller coaster is to take lives "with elegance and euphoria", either for euthanasia or execution purposes. John Allen, who had been the president of the Philadelphia Toboggan Company, inspired Urbonas with his description of the "ultimate" roller coaster as one that "sends out 24 people and they all come back dead".

== Design ==
The concept design of the layout begins with a steep-angled lift that takes riders up 500 metres (1,600 ft) to the top, a climb that would take a couple of minutes to complete and allow the passengers to contemplate their life. (Note: For comparison, the tallest roller coaster ever built, Falcons Flight, has a max height of 195 m (640 ft).) From there, all passengers are given the choice to exit the train if they wish to do so. If they do not, they will have some time to say their last words.

All passengers are required to press a button to continue the ride, which then takes the cars down a 500 m (1,600 ft) drop, propelling the train at speeds up to 360 kilometres per hour (220 mph; 100 m/s), close to its terminal velocity, before flattening out and speeding into the first of its seven slightly clothoid inversions. Each inversion would decrease in diameter to maintain the lethal 10 g force on passengers as the train loses speed. After a sharp right-hand turn, the train would enter a straight track that goes back to the station, where the dead are unloaded and new passengers can board.

== Mechanism of action ==
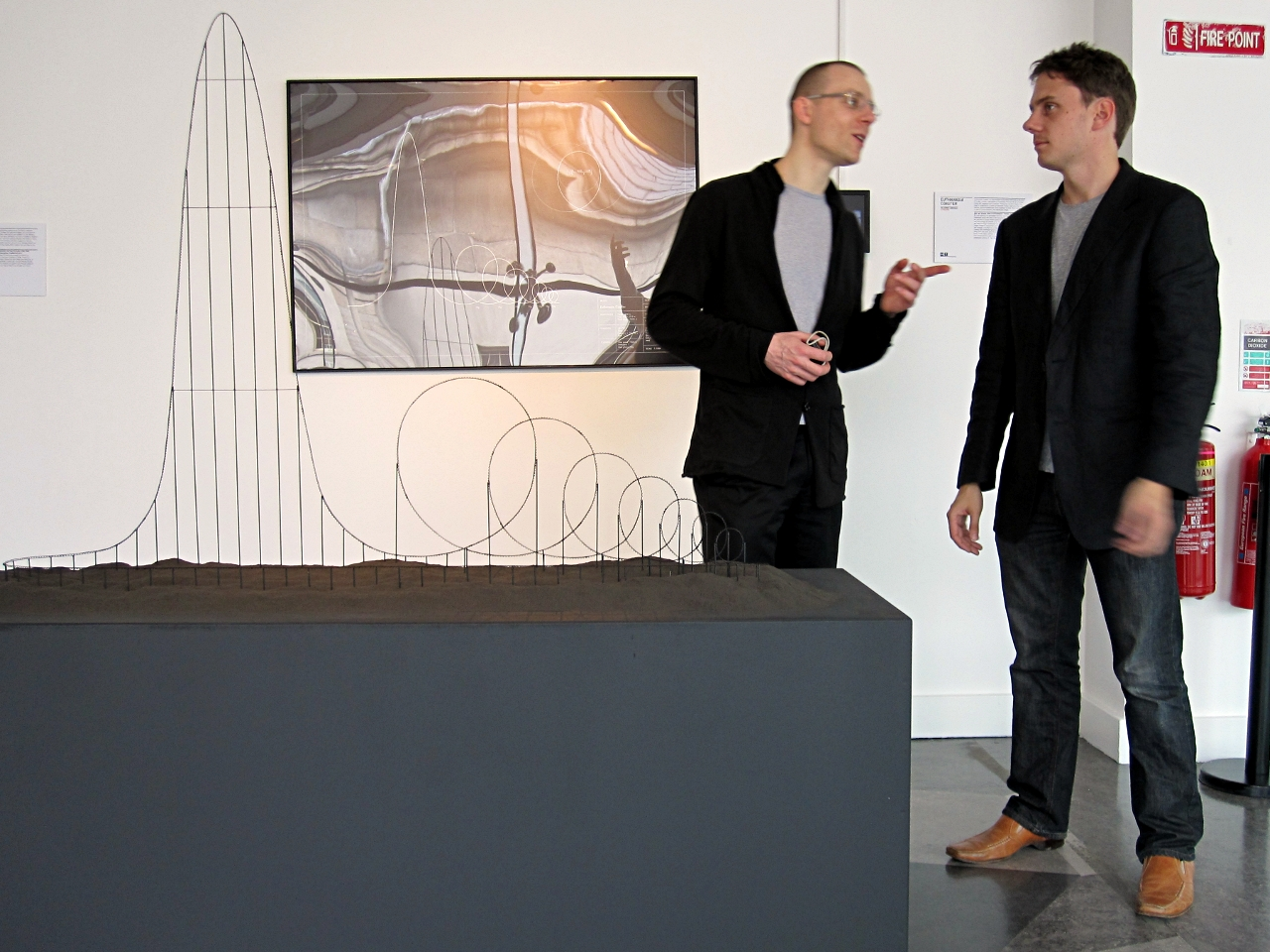
Urbonas (left) and Euthanasia Coaster at HUMAN+ display at the Science Gallery in Dublin

The Euthanasia Coaster would kill its passengers through prolonged cerebral hypoxia, or insufficient supply of oxygen to the brain. The ride's seven inversions would inflict 10 g (g-force) on its passengers for 60 seconds, causing g-force related symptoms starting with greyout through tunnel vision to syncope, and eventually g-LOC (g-force induced loss of consciousness) and death. Subsequent inversions or a second run of the rollercoaster would serve as insurance against unintentional survival of more robust passengers.

== Exhibition ==
The Euthanasia Coaster was first shown as part of the HUMAN+ display at the Science Gallery in Dublin in 2012. The display was later named the year's flagship exhibition by the Science Gallery. Within this theme, the coaster highlights the issues that come with life extension. The item was also displayed at the HUMAN+ exhibit at Centre de Cultura Contemporània de Barcelona in 2015.

== In popular culture ==
In 2012, Norwegian rock group Major Parkinson released "Euthanasia Roller Coaster", a digital single with lyrics alluding to Urbonas's Euthanasia Coaster.

Sequoia Nagamatsu's novel How High We Go in the Dark, published on January 18, 2022, prominently features a euthanasia roller coaster for children afflicted with an incurable plague.

The 2023 television series Mrs. Davis features a roller coaster as a method of ending one's life.
