= Florian Willet =

German author and pro-euthanasia activist (1977–2025)

- Born: 3 August 1977; Heidelberg, Baden-Württemberg, West Germany
- Died: 5 May 2025 (aged 47); Cologne, North Rhine-Westphalia, Germany
- Occupations: Author, pro-euthanasia activist

Florian Willet (3 August 1977 – 5 May 2025) was a German author and pro-euthanasia activist.

== Biography ==
Willet was born in Heidelberg on 3 August 1977. His father was an architect.

Willet's father committed suicide when he was 14. Willet recalled being "surprised" when others told him his father had committed a "selfish" act, saying that although he was sad about his father's death, he did not think that his father had been sad.

Willet initially worked in asset management, before pursuing a career in science. He worked as a communication psychologist, legal scholar and economist. As a university lecturer and academic consultant; Willet focused on behavioral economics, legal philosophy and anthropology, with an interest in cognitive and statistical biases in opinion and judgement formation processes.

Willet lived in Switzerland. He was a spokesperson for Dignitas, and later the president of The Last Resort, an organization which provides assisted suicide. He was a member of Mensa.

Willet was arrested on 23 September 2024. He was accused of helping an American woman die by suicide with a Sarco pod in Merishausen, Schaffhausen, Switzerland earlier that day. Although assisted suicide is legal in the country, it is strictly regulated. The woman had been using a device called a "suicide pod", produced by the company Sarco. Willet was held in pretrial detention for 70 days, some of which was spent in solitary confinement, before being released in December 2024.

In January 2025, he attempted suicide at his home in Zurich, resulting in him getting hospitalized for psychiatric treatment.

Willet died in Cologne on 5 May 2025, aged 47. According to the inventor of the Sarco pod, Philip Nitschke, Willet died by assisted suicide. Nitschke further added that Willet had been traumatized by his 2024 detention. The criminal case against him was dropped after his death.

== Publications ==
- Deutschlands Frauen schaffen ihre Männer ab: Florian Willet erklärt weiblichen Chauvinismus, Ludwig, 2011, ISBN 978-1-52032-927-7.
- Florian Willet denkt nach über Hirnforschung, Evolution und Ökologie: Neuropsychologie und Verhaltensökonomie, Ludwig, 2011, ISBN 978-3-86935-200-8.
- Der Soziale Schwan: wo Kahneman, Taleb und Darwin auf Marx stossen, Ludwig, 2017, ISBN 978-1-52032-923-9.
- Mir nach, ich folge Euch!: Wie uns die Parteien über den Tisch ziehen, Solibro, 2018, ISBN 978-3-96079-045-7.
- Wie die Parteien uns über den Tisch ziehen, Solibro, 2021, ISBN 978-3-96079-084-6.
