= Abraham Wolbarst =

American physician

Abraham Leo Wolbarst (1872 – 1952) was an American physician.

A Jewish American physician, Wolbarst was a promoter of universal circumcision for boys, which he famously claimed prevented penile cancer due to the accumulation of smegma in uncircumcised males, which he believed to be carcinogenic. While the specific arguments related to smegma have largely been refuted, it remains the case that childhood/adolescent circumcision is protective against invasive penile cancer. He also claimed that epilepsy was caused by a tight foreskin in uncircumcised males.

Outside of his work on male circumcision, Wolbarst was a member of the Euthanasia Society of America, wherein he promoted the killing of individuals with health defects, who he believed were a financial burden on society.
