= Exit (right-to-die organisation) =

Right-to-die organisation based in Scotland

- Named after: Exit, the brand name of Dignity in Dying from 1979–1982
- Formation: 1980; 46 years ago
- Staff: None

Exit is a not-for-profit, pro-euthanasia organisation based in Scotland that lobbies for and provides information about voluntary euthanasia and assisted suicide. It has particularly focused on research and publication of works which provide information about suicide methods, including How to Die With Dignity, the first book published on the subject.

== History ==
Exit was formed in 1980 in Scotland to research and publish information on suicide for people suffering from serious illnesses. Originally part of Dignity in Dying (which was briefly also known as "Exit"), it broke away when the parent group vacillated over producing such guidance.

In 1980, as Scottish Exit, it published the first suicide guide in the world, How to Die With Dignity by Dr. George Mair. Other suicide books by authors around the world soon followed. The Society was originally called Scottish Exit, a branch of the UK-wide group Exit (now known as Dignity in Dying). When the parent group's plans to publish such a book were delayed, the Scottish group formed an independent society dedicated to such publications. During its history, it has also been known as The Voluntary Euthanasia Society of Scotland, or the Scottish Voluntary Euthanasia Society, reverting to the name of Exit in 2000.

How to Die With Dignity was followed by various supplements as new information became available. In 1993, authors CK Smith and CG Docker collaborated on a new book, Departing Drugs, distinguished by extensive literature searches into various drugs, and peer review. They convened the International Drugs Consensus Working Party, an unpaid research collective, to help sift the evidence and finalize their results. The book was published in several languages as a non-profit venture and distributed privately by Dutch, Spanish, German, Canadian and American organisations. Initial legal uncertainties and concerns about adverse publicity however persuaded Exit to release it in Scotland only under the title of a new 'Supplement' to How to Die With Dignity. Docker & Smith's technical data in support of Departing Drugs was published in a separate volume called Beyond Final Exit, with another contributing author, Bruce Dunn, whose chapter on inert gases laid the foundations for the 'helium method' of suicide.

In 2007, a major revision was needed and Exit published, Five Last Acts, a larger book (187 pages) that detailed the use of helium and four other main methods of rational suicide, most of which were not covered in Departing Drugs. A similar methodology was used, examining the science behind its assertions. The Five Last Acts series is distinguished by footnotes and citations to evidence. Although the first edition was made available only to members of Exit and other right-to-die societies under strict conditions, such distribution methods were augmented in subsequent editions by placing these more substantial books on general release. Five Last Acts II followed in 2010, and Five Last Acts - The Exit Path in 2013. A major update to the latter was released in May 2015 after concerns had been raised over helium balloon gas being diluted with air by some manufacturers. Exit then published the world's first guide to using welding gas nitrogen as an alternative.

Exit worked for the acceptance of the living will (advance health care directive), initially advocating a living will using a Scottish legal instrument known as the Tutor Dative, and then revising its templates in accordance with developing legislation and the use of Values Histories. Exit highlights both the benefits and shortcomings of advanced health care directives and has sought to establish proper understanding by means of contributing chapters in both the academic and legal press. Exit's Director, Chris Docker, has worked for the organisation since 1980. He holds a post-graduate degree from Glasgow University and has lectured at undergraduate and post-graduate level, also writing on end-of-life issues for academic students (Dartmouth), and the legal profession, and winning an award for his research into death by refusing food and liquids.

== Structure ==
Exit uses the Carver Model of Policy Governance in the running of its affairs to ensure strict adherence to its aims. Exit accepts members worldwide. It publishes a substantial magazine, Exit Newsletter, with updates on self-deliverance and living wills, and a mixture of academic and light-reading articles on these subjects. Contributors have included well-known names including Peter Singer, Helga Kuhse, Colin Brewer, Faye Girsh, Sheila McLean, Michael Irwin, Derek Humphry, Arthur Caplan, Kenyon Mason, Ludovic Kennedy, Rev. A Bennett, Alexander McCall Smith, John Beloff, (Bishop) Michael Hare Duke, Oswald Hanfling, Wendy Savage, (Bishop) Alastair Haggart, Philip Nitschke, Janet Radcliffe Richards and Robin Downie. It conducts full-day hands-on workshops for members. Exit works within existing law so does not engage in civil disobedience or one-one-one direct assistance in suicide. Exit is independent and not connected with other organisations of the same or similar name, such as the Australian group, Exit International; the Finnish group, Exitus; the Italian group called Exit, or the two German Groups, Exit ADMD and EXIT-Deutsche Schweiz) but networks with scientific groups and its members worldwide.

== Campaigning ==
Exit advocates a 'permissive' model for legal reform to allow 'exceptions to the rule' against euthanasia or assisted suicide. It was involved in a major initiative of Glasgow University's Institute of Law & Ethics in Medicine to look at the feasibility of a law on physician-assisted suicide for the UK.

== See also ==
- Euthanasia in the United Kingdom
- Dignitas
- World Federation of Right to Die Societies
