= Euthanasia device =

Machine allowing an individual to die quickly with minimal pain

A euthanasia device is a machine engineered to allow an individual to die quickly with minimal pain. The most common devices are those designed to help terminally ill people die by voluntary euthanasia or assisted suicide without prolonged pain. They may be operated by a second party, such as a physician, or by the person wishing to die. There is an ongoing debate on the ethics of euthanasia and the use of euthanasia devices.

== Notable devices ==
=== Thanatron ===
Invented by Jack Kevorkian, who used this device and called it a "Thanatron" or death machine (after the Greek daemon, Thanatos). It worked by pushing a button to deliver the euthanizing drugs mechanically through an IV. It had three canisters mounted on a metal frame. Each bottle had a syringe that connected to a single IV line in the person's arm. One contained saline, one contained a sleep-inducing barbiturate called sodium thiopental and the last a lethal mixture of potassium chloride, which immediately stopped the heart, and pancuronium bromide, a paralytic medication to prevent spasms during the dying process — the same three substances used in lethal injection protocols in some of the United States. Two deaths were assisted with this method.

=== Mercitron ===
Kevorkian assisted others with a device that employed a gas mask fed by a canister of carbon monoxide which was called "Mercitron" (mercy machine). This became necessary because Kevorkian's medical license had been revoked after the first two deaths, and he could no longer have legal access to the substances required for the "Thanatron". It was a rudimentary device consisting of a canister of carbon monoxide attached to a face mask with a tube. A valve must be released to start the gas flowing. Depending on the person's disability, a makeshift handle may be attached to the valve to make it easier to turn. Or, with the valve in the "open" position, a clip or clothespin could be clamped on the tubing. Pulling it off allows the gas to flow. By Kevorkian's estimates, this method took 10 minutes or longer. Sometimes he encouraged people to take sedatives or muscle relaxants to keep them calm as they breathed deeply of the gas.

=== Deliverance Machine ===
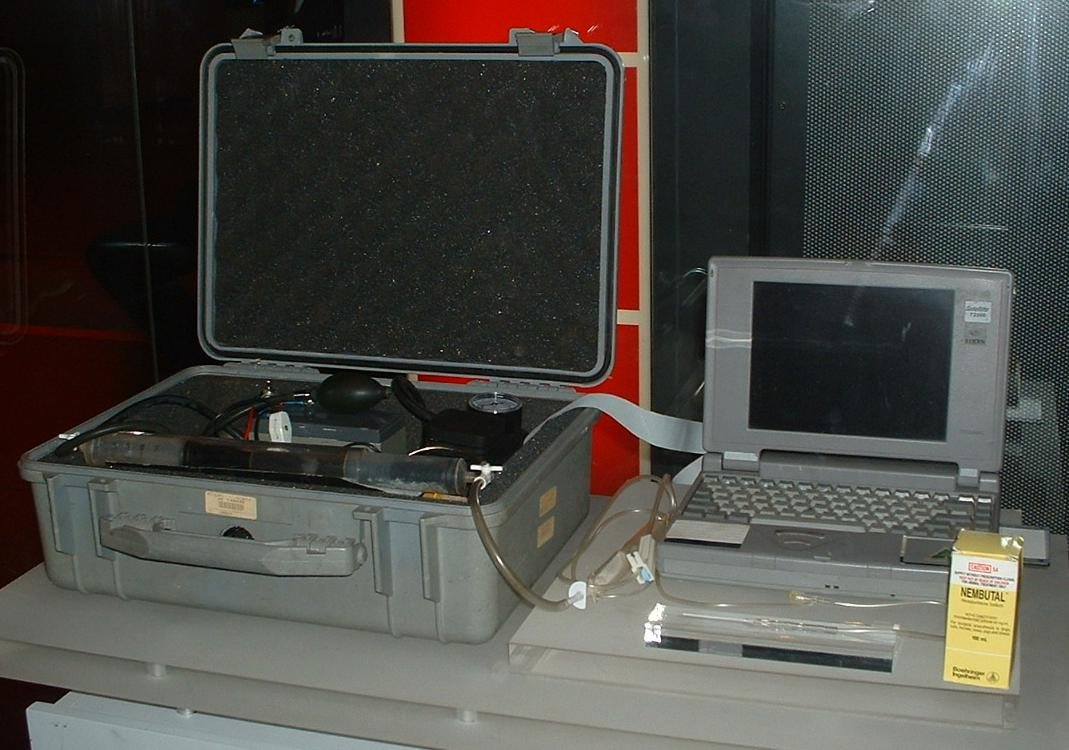
Philip Nitschke's "Deliverance Machine"

The Deliverance Machine was invented by Philip Nitschke. It consisted of software entitled Deliverance, that came on a special laptop that could be connected to an IV in a person's arm. The computer program asked a series of questions to confirm the person's intent to die that being:

1. "Are you aware that if you go ahead to the last screen and press the 'Yes' button, you will be given a lethal dose of medications and die?"
2. "Are you certain you understand that if you proceed and press the 'Yes' button on the next screen that you will die?"
3. "In 15 seconds you will be given a lethal injection ... press 'Yes' to proceed."

After answering affirmatively to all of the questions, a lethal injection of barbiturates was triggered.

In an interview Nitschke said that, even if it had been legal for a doctor to give a lethal injection, he preferred that the patient be in control of the administration of the drugs. Reducing the role of a physician also allowed a patient to be alone with their family during the euthanasia process.

The machine was used, legally, while the Australian Northern Territory's Rights of the Terminally Ill Act 1995 was in effect; the act was eventually nullified by legislation of the Australian Parliament. The machine was put on display in the Science Museum in London.

=== Exit International's euthanasia device ===
The Exit International euthanasia device was invented by Philip Nitschke in 2008. It uses a canister of nitrogen, a plastic suicide bag, and a plastic tube with one end attached to the gas canister and the other fixed inside the bag by a tie held by adhesive tape. Nitschke said, "That idea of giving people access to a means of feeling that they're back in control of this issue is actually a way of prolonging life. It may seem paradoxical, but what we find is when people feel that they're back in control, they're less likely to do desperate things."

==== Background ====
The basic principle of autoeuthanasia by anoxia was first described in the book Final Exit by Derek Humphry in 1991. The original methodology was devised, using helium, by the NuTech group.

==== Description ====
Nitschke described his device as a modification of the exit bag with helium method described in The Peaceful Pill Handbook. Helium was replaced by a cylinder of compressed nitrogen and a regulator to supply the nitrogen into a plastic bag. One advantage of this method was the availability of larger amounts of nitrogen and flow rates last longer. Nitschke states that nitrogen is also more physiologically inert than helium, with less chance of adverse reaction, (Note: There are no recorded adverse effects other than asphyxiation due to breathing helium or nitrogen at atmospheric pressure. Both are routinely used as breathing gas diluents for underwater diving.) and that loss of consciousness is quick with death following within minutes. Unlike helium cylinders, nitrogen cylinders can be refilled in the event of leakage (Note: Cylinders for helium and nitrogen can be refillable or non-refillable depending on the type available on the local market) and nitrogen gas is naturally present in all tissues and this use cannot be detected during an autopsy.

==== Process ====
The principle behind the device is oxygen deprivation that leads to hypoxia, asphyxia and death within minutes. Deprivation of oxygen in the presence of raised levels of carbon dioxide creates a sense of suffocation (the hypercapnic alarm response), which usually leads to panic, and struggling even when unconscious, whereas anoxia in the presence of an inert gas, like nitrogen, helium or argon, does not.

External contact with an inert gas is harmless. Inhalation of an oxygen-free inert gas is lethal, but released into the open air, it quickly disperses, and is harmless to others. It is neither flammable nor explosive. Humphry's book describes close contact with the gas achieved by enclosing the head in a strong, clear plastic bag, secured around the neck, with the inert gas fed into the bag by plastic tubing.

Suicides using this method are documented in the forensic literature. In the study "Asphyxial suicide with helium and a plastic bag" (Ogden et al.), the authors describe a typical case history, in which an elderly cancer sufferer used a plastic bag which was secured over her head, a helium tank, and a plastic hose attached to the tank valve and plastic bag. The authors noted that a suicide bag filled with helium will cause almost immediate unconsciousness, followed within minutes by death. Time to loss of consciousness in a bag filled with nitrogen is 15 seconds, (Note: This time starts when the person inhales, and does not count any breathhold duration which would extend the period accordingly.) according to professors Copeland, Pappas and Parr, who campaigned for a more humane execution method in the US state of Oklahoma.

=== Sarco device ===
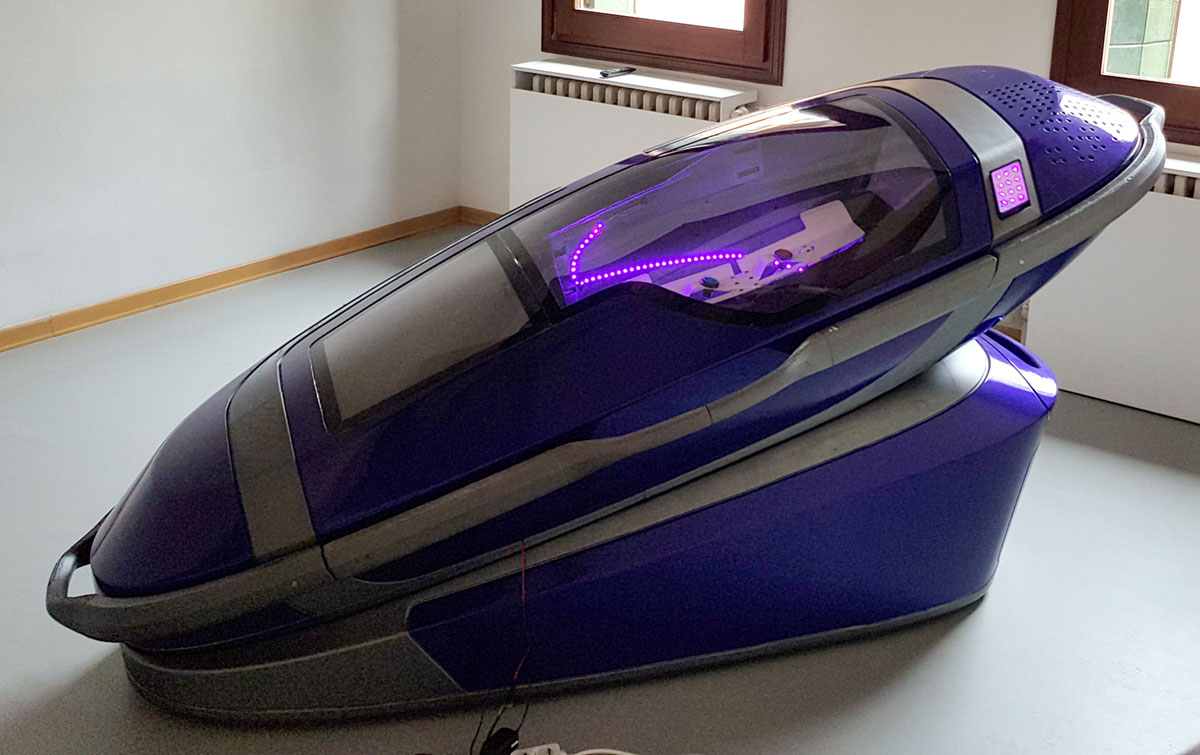
The Sarco pod

In 2017, Nitschke invented the 3D-printed suicide capsule, which he named "the Sarco". The Sarco would contain a touchpad and nitrogen, and once an activation code is entered, "the person is again asked if they wish to die". An affirmative answer causes nitrogen to flow into the capsule, displacing oxygen, and death follows shortly thereafter. The Sarco machine cannot be printed on small 3D printers. The Sarco offers a "euphoric death". Nitschke planned to release the open source plans for the Sarco by 2019.

== In fiction ==
=== Suicide booth ===
A suicide booth is a fictional machine for committing suicide. Suicide booths appear in numerous fictional settings, one of which is the American animated series Futurama. Compulsory self-execution booths were also featured in an episode of the original Star Trek TV series entitled "A Taste of Armageddon". The concept can be found as early as 1893. When a series of suicides were vigorously discussed in United Kingdom newspapers, critic William Archer suggested that in the golden age there would be penny-in-the-slot machines by which a man could kill himself.

Following Archer's statement in 1893, the 1895 story "The Repairer of Reputations" by Robert W. Chambers featured the Governor of New York presiding over the opening of the first "Government Lethal Chamber" in the then-future year of 1920, after the repeal of laws against suicide:

"The Government has seen fit to acknowledge the right of man to end an existence which may have become intolerable to him, through physical suffering or mental despair." [...] He paused, and turned to the white Lethal Chamber. The silence in the street was absolute. "There a painless death awaits him who can no longer bear the sorrows of this life."

However, as Chambers' protagonist who relates the story is suffering from brain damage, it remains ambiguous whether or not he is an unreliable narrator.

Modern writer Martin Amis provoked a small controversy in January 2010 when he facetiously advocated "suicide booths" for the elderly, of which he said:

They'll be a population of demented very old people, like an invasion of terrible immigrants, stinking out the restaurants and cafes and shops. [...] I can imagine a sort of civil war between the old and the young in 10 or 15 years' time. [...] There should be a booth on every corner where you could get a martini and a medal.

==== Futurama ====
In the world of Futurama, Stop-and-Drop suicide booths resemble phone booths and cost one quarter per use. The booths have at least three modes of death: "quick and painless", "slow and horrible", and "clumsy bludgeoning", though it is also implied that "electrocution, with a side order of poison" exists, and that the eyes can be scooped out for an extra charge. After a mode of death is selected and executed, the machine cheerfully says, "You are now dead. Thank you for using Stop-and-Drop, America's favorite suicide booth since 2008", or in Futurama: The Beast with a Billion Backs, "You are now dead, please take your receipt", and at this time many untaken receipts are shown.

The first appearance of a suicide booth in Futurama is in "Space Pilot 3000", in which the character Bender wants to use it after learning that the girders he bent were used to construct suicide booths. Fry at first mistakes the suicide booth for a phone booth, and Bender offers to share it with him. Fry requests a collect call, which the machine interprets as a "slow and horrible" death. It then turns out that "slow and horrible" can be survived by pressing oneself against the side of the booth, leading Bender to accuse the machine of being a rip-off. In Futurama: Bender's Big Score, after failing to initially chase down Fry in the year 2000, Bender wants to kill himself, but then ironically mistakes a regular phone booth for a suicide booth. A suicide booth reappeared in Futurama: The Beast with a Billion Backs where Bender once again attempts to end his life, but is saved when dropped into the League of Robots' lair. During the season 6 episode "Ghost in the Machines", Bender commits suicide in a booth named Lynn that is still angry at him over the end of their relationship six months earlier; his ghost eventually makes its way back to his body so he can continue living.

According to series co-creator Matt Groening, the suicide booth concept was inspired by a 1937 Donald Duck cartoon, Modern Inventions, in which Donald Duck visits a Museum of the Future and is nearly killed by various push button gadgets. The suicide booth was closely enough associated with Bender's character that in 2001 it was featured as the display stand for the Bender action figure. It was also one of the many features of the series which troubled the executives at Fox when Groening and David X. Cohen first pitched the series.

==== In other media ====
In the Star Trek episode "A Taste of Armageddon", people who were deemed war casualties by the government of Eminiar VII were required to enter suicide booths. Treaty arrangements require that everyone who is calculated as "dead" in the hypothetical thermonuclear war simulated using computers actually die, without damaging any infrastructure. In the end, the computers are destroyed, the war can no longer be calculated in this way, the treaty breaks down, and faced with a real threat, and the presumption is made that peace begins. After the Heaven's Gate mass suicide event was linked by tabloids to an extreme fascination with science fiction and Star Trek in particular it was noted that multiple episodes, including "A Taste of Armageddon", actually advocated an anti-suicide standpoint as opposed to the viewpoint expressed by the Heaven's Gate group.

In the seventeenth season The Simpsons episode "Million Dollar Abie", a suicide machine called a "diePod" (a pun on the iPod) is featured. The diePod allows the patient to choose visual and auditory themes that present themselves as the patient is killed. It also shows three different modes, namely, "Quick Painless Death", "Slow and Painful Death", and "Megadeath" (a pun on a band of a similarly spelled name). It is a reference to the suicide building in Soylent Green. Being a direct parody of the aforementioned scene, Abraham Simpson receives the opportunity to select his final vision and musical accompaniment: 1960s-era footage of "cops beatin' up hippies" to the tune of "Pennsylvania 6-5000" by the Glenn Miller Orchestra.

== See also ==
- Euthanasia
- Euthanasia Coaster
- Sarco pod
- Suicide bag
- Suicide tourism
