= International Task Force on Euthanasia and Assisted Suicide =

Advocacy organization

The International Task Force on Euthanasia and Assisted Suicide is a 501(c)(3) non-profit educational organization that concerns itself with the issues of euthanasia, doctor-prescribed suicide, advance directives, assisted suicide proposals, "right-to-die" cases, disability rights, pain control, and related bioethical issues. They oppose the legalization of euthanasia. The executive director of the Task Force is lawyer Rita Marker, author of Deadly Compassion: The Death of Ann Humphry and the Truth About Euthanasia, which puts forth an account of the death of the wife of euthanasia advocate Derek Humphry. In January 2011, The International Task Force changed its name to The Patients Rights Council.
