= Gerald A. Larue =

American biblical scholar and humanist (1916–2014)

Gerald Alexander Larue (June 20, 1916 – September 17, 2014) was an American scholar of religion and professor emeritus of gerontology, a former ordained minister who became an agnostic, archaeologist, debunker of biblical stories and accounts of miracles, and humanist.

== Biography ==
Larue was born in Calgary, Canada, into a family of a salesman. He earned a bachelor's degree from the University of Alberta in 1943 and was ordained in the United Church of Canada in 1945.

Over the next eight years he led congregations in Canada and California while completing his theological studies. In 1953 he earned a doctorate from Pacific School of Religion in Berkeley, where he also studied archaeology. Even during his years in School of Religion he questioned religious dogma. According to his son's account, professors called him Heretic Larue, as he was treating religious studies more as historical or scientific facts that could be challenged. He gave up the pulpit in 1953 because, he later told the Orange County Register, "while I was doing good things in society, there was no intellectual growth for me." He regarded the existence of God as "an open question."

In 1958 Larue joined faculty of University of Southern California as a professor of biblical history and archaeology. In the 1960s he took part in digs in Egypt, Israel, the West Bank and other parts of the Middle East, returning with artifacts preserved in a USC archaeological collection.

Larue gradually turned his attention to topics such as the Bible's views of sex and gender and ancient practices surrounding death and dying. Larue joined the USC Davis School of Gerontology in 1981 staying as a professor until his retirement from USC in 2006.

He was a long-time supporter of the Council for Secular Humanism, and a co-founder of its inter-disciplinary Committee for the Scientific Examination of Religion in 1983, becoming its first president until 2003. He received the Humanist of the Year Award from the American Humanist Association in 1989.

Larue was on the editorial board of Skeptic magazine from its founding in 1992 to the time of his death. In 2004, Larue received a Leibovitz Award for Distinguished Volunteer Service to Seniors.

Larue died at age 98 in Newport Beach after a stroke.

== Critique of Supernatural ==
Larue's articulate critiques of religious dogma, supernaturalism and pseudoscience made him one of the most prominent in the field. During an academic career spanning five decades, Larue became a widely cited expert on topics including Satanism, visions of Mary, and death and dying. Over the years he addressed many other biblical stories. He hypothesized that an earthquake, not God, caused Jericho's walls to collapse, and that Lazarus did not rise from the dead but awoke from a coma.

He once told a woman whose silver rosary turned to gold during a pilgrimage to a Marian apparition site to dip the rosary in tarnish remover. She declined, but Larue persisted in his battles against what he called "magical thinking." Larue "had a strong regard for truth and limited patience for obscurantism. He had one foot in the real world and one foot in the ivory tower," said Tom Flynn, executive director of the Council for Secular Humanism.

== Noah's Ark Hoax ==
Larue was at the center of a controversy over an elaborate hoax in which his friend George Jammal claimed that he had found Noah's Ark on Mount Ararat in Turkey. The forged discovery was featured on a 1993 CBS documentary titled The Incredible Discovery of Noah's Ark, which made a case for the existence of the ark as described in the Bible. Hosted by Darren McGavin, the special featured interviews with John C. Whitcomb, Philip C. Hammond, Charles Berlitz, David Coppedge, Carl Baugh and Tim LaHaye.The centerpiece of the film were the claims of ark discovery and presenting a piece of wood from the vessel. After the broadcast Larue exposed the claims as a hoax—and himself as an advisor to the hoaxer—in an interview with Time magazine.

Following the exposure, Sun International Pictures argued that it was a secular humanist plot to discredit Jammal. Sun issued a press release which complained that it was "sad and unfortunate that Dr. Larue, a distinguished USC professor, would victimize Mr. Jammal and his family to execute a third-party hoax in which he was the primary benefactor." John Morris of the Institute for Creation Research pointed out that he had interviewed Jammal back in 1986, and that it was unreasonable to believe a hoax would have been carried out for that long. However Larue's statements were correct: Jammal had hoaxed Sun International Pictures and the Institute for Creation Research, and they had either missed or been unwilling to accept the numerous clues which he had planted in the content of his claims, such as the names of the individuals who had helped him on his alleged quest for Noah's Ark: "Mr. Asholian," "Vladimir Sobitchsky," and, best of all, "Allis Buls Hitian". Jammal's sample of wood from the Ark was actually a piece of railroad tie he had found behind his house and made to appear old by cooking it in his kitchen with a mixture of blueberry and almond wine, iodine, sweet-and-sour barbecue sauce, and teriyaki sauce.

As Larue pointed out, Carbon-14 dating the wood would have given the game away, but none of the creationists or show producers bothered to do so. The producers also ignored the criticisms of Jammal's account given by Bill Crouse, a regular critic of Noah's Ark claims.

== Geroethics ==
After retiring from the USC School of Religion in 1981, Larue taught at the USC Davis School of Gerontology for 25 years. He was a longtime proponent of the "Death With Dignity" movement and gained recognition for his popular course "Death and Dying." The courses were cathartic for many students, especially when Larue asked them to reflect on losses they had experienced. To make the subject real, he passed around a bottle filled with the ashes of a dear colleague, psychologist Herman M. Harvey, who had given Larue permission to use his remains as a teaching tool before he died. "You are never so aware of the importance of pursuing life until you accept death," he was telling the press.

His 1985 book Euthanasia and Religion was described as "the very first book which described how the world's religions addressed right to die."

In 1980 he attended a meeting in Los Angeles organized by right-to-die movement pioneer Derek Humphry, a British-born journalist and author who had written "Jean's Way", a book about his terminally ill wife's planned suicide in 1975. Of the 20 people present, Larue was the only one willing to become a member of the group Humphry proposed to advocate for assisted suicide, so Humphry asked him to head it. Larue became founding president of the Hemlock Society aimed to provide information to the terminally ill and legalize physician-assisted suicide.

"He stepped up to the plate when others were afraid," Humphry said. "He presided over Hemlock with great diplomacy when it was highly sensitive and controversial—when America was just beginning to address the subject of the hot-button topic of the right to choose to die when at life's end." Larue served for eight years, until Humphry moved the Hemlock Society to Oregon in 1988.

== Larue's Ten Commandments for Freethinkers ==
Larue argued that the secular state must be maintained, not controlled or unduly influenced by religion, lest the freedoms cherished by the secular humanists fade into the past. Addressing the 1997 conference in Orlando, he outlined what he called the Ten Commandments:

1. Must follow ethical principle known as authenticity, meaning that adherents of freethought, secular humanistic, atheistic, agnostic and other ideas and values must recognize one another
2. Always be open-minded and open to challenge, operate on the basis what we think we know today in the light of the evidence
3. Employ the best tools in possession to substantiate the claims: the scientific method, critical thinking, the employment of logic and rational thought, and the need for in-depth research before making proclamations
4. Must not descend to the level of denigration of those who hold different viewpoints, recognize the right of others to differ
5. Must embrace humanist ethical principles so that concern and interests and purposes are ultimately directed toward maximizing the potential of human beings
6. Must project positive image, not a group of people who are against everything; must support one another and join in mutual efforts
7. Must produce reading material, radio programs, television programs that embody the best research possible
8. Must help men and women understand the importance of being personally responsible for what develops through their lifetime, recognize the fact that help in the time of need does not come from some supernatural source, but from human sources and from one another
9. 21st century is truly a time of opportunity for the new enlightenment
10. There is only one way in which the hope of a new enlightenment can come into being: through each of us and all of us working toward that end

== Books ==
- Old Testament Life and Literature, Allyn and Bacon, 1968
- Ancient myth and modern man, Prentice-Hall, 1975, ISBN 9780130354853
- Sex and the Bible, Prometheus Books, 1983, ISBN 9780879752064
- Euthanasia and Religion: A Survey of the Attitudes of World Religions to the Right-to-die, Hemlock Society, 1985, ISBN 9780960603039
- Ancient Myth and Modern Life, Centerline Press, 1988, ISBN 9780913111246
- The Way of Positive Humanism, Centerline Press, 1989, ISBN 9780913111253
- The supernatural, the occult, and the Bible, Prometheus Books, 1990,
- Geroethics: A New Vision of Growing Old in America, Prometheus Books, 1992, ISBN 9780879757502
- Freethought Across the Centuries: Toward a New Age of Enlightenment, Humanist Press, 1996, ISBN 9780931779039
- Playing God: Fifty Religions' Views on Your Right to Die, Moyer Bell, 1996, ISBN 9781559211451
