= Sarco pod =

Euthanasia device using inert gas

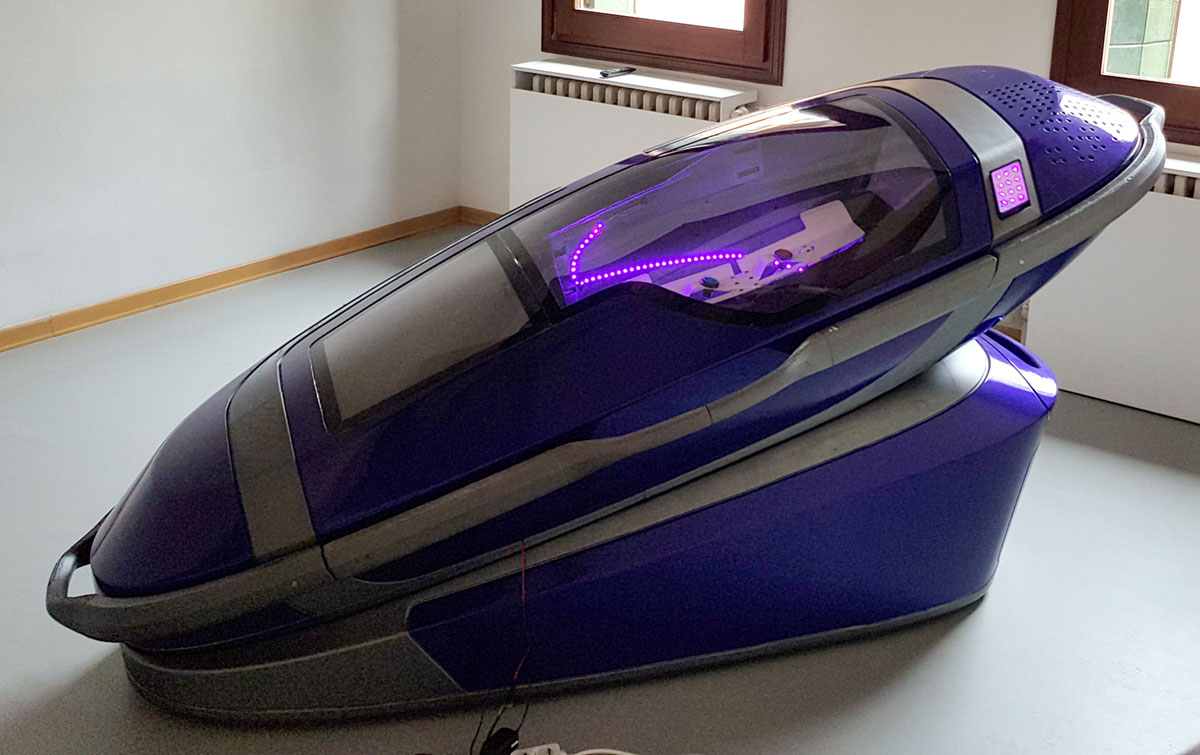
Sarco, a euthanasia device invented by Philip Nitschke

The Sarco pod (sometimes referred to as a "suicide pod") is a euthanasia device or machine consisting of a 3D-printed detachable capsule mounted on a stand that contains a canister of liquid nitrogen to die by suicide through inert gas asphyxiation. "Sarco" is short for "sarcophagus". It is used in conjunction with an inert gas (nitrogen) which decreases oxygen levels rapidly without triggering the sense of suffocation and struggling before unconsciousness, known as the hypercapnic alarm response, caused by the presence of high carbon dioxide concentrations in the blood. The Sarco was invented by euthanasia campaigner Philip Nitschke in 2017. Nitschke said in 2021 that he sought and received legal advice about the device's legality in Switzerland.

== History ==
The Sarco is an expansion of the hypoxic death provided by a suicide bag. Many people will not consider euthanasia by suicide bag for aesthetic reasons, or may feel claustrophobic inside a bag. Nitschke calls this the "plastic bag factor". The Sarco was developed to address these objections.

== Mechanics ==
Access to the Sarco is controlled by an online test to gauge mental fitness. If applicants pass, they receive an access code to a Sarco device which is valid for 24 hours.

Users of the Sarco can choose either a dark or transparent view from the capsule. The transparent view is chosen if they wish to transport the machine to a particular location to see a certain vista from the machine. The inventor feels that "where you die is certainly an important factor".

The capsule provides for a rapid decrease in oxygen level while maintaining a low level of carbon dioxide. On activation, 4 litres (1.1 US gal) of nitrogen gas causes the oxygen level to drop silently to less than 5% in less than one minute. According to Nitschke: "The occupant presses the button and the capsule is filled with nitrogen. They will feel a bit dizzy but will then rapidly lose consciousness and die."

== Design and manufacture ==
The design of the device was a collaboration between Nitschke and Dutch industrial designer Alexander Bannink.

Sarco is 3D-printed in sections measuring 1,000 by 500 by 500 millimetres (39 by 20 by 20 in). The design software allows for devices of different sizes to be made according to the client's dimensions. Nitschke has said that the design is intended to resemble that of a spaceship, in order to give users the feel that they are traveling to the "great beyond".

== Reactions ==
Thaddeus Pope, a bioethicist at the Mitchell Hamline School of Law, said the debate over Sarco may result in a new way of approaching end-of-life options by legislators, saying that "That might be bigger or more important than the actual Sarco itself", and that Nitschke was "illustrating the limitations of the medical model and forcing us to think".

Critics have described the device as "just a glorified gas chamber", and others have raised concerns that it is glamorising suicide, and could lead to "suicide contagions" that inspire additional deaths.

== Use ==
In 2024, right to die organisation "The Last Resort" announced the Sarco pod would be used in Switzerland for the first time. In response, the cantonal doctor of Valais issued a precautionary ban on its use.

On 23 September 2024, police in the Swiss canton of Schaffhausen arrested several people, including The Last Resort CEO Florian Willet, after a 64-year-old woman from the United States had used the machine. The public prosecutor's office for the canton announced the opening of criminal proceedings for the inducement, aiding and abetting of suicide. On the same day, Swiss Federal Council member Elizabeth Baume-Schneider stated that use of the Sarco Pod was incompatible with Swiss law. On 2 December 2024, Willet was released from police custody. He died by suicide on 5 May 2025. Nitschke stated that Willet died as a direct result of his arrest.

== See also ==
- Assisted suicide
- Bodily integrity
- Coup de grâce
- Dysthanasia
- Right to die
- Self-ownership
- Suicide pill
- Voluntary euthanasia
