= Hemlock Society =

Assisted suicide advocacy organization (1980–2003)

- Founded: 1980
- Dissolved: 2003
- Type: Right-to-die, assisted suicide
- Headquarters: Santa Monica, California; Los Angeles, California; Eugene, Oregon; combined Portland, Oregon and Denver, Colorado
- Location: United States
- Members: 46,000
- Key people: Derek Humphry, Ann Wickett Humphry, Gerald A. Larue, Faye Girsh
- Website: compassionandchoices.org

The Hemlock Society (sometimes called Hemlock Society USA) was an American right-to-die and assisted suicide advocacy organization which existed from 1980 to 2003, and took its name from the hemlock plant Conium maculatum, a highly poisonous herb in the carrot family, as a direct reference to the method by which the Athenian philosopher Socrates took his life in 399 BC, as described in Plato's Phaedo.

It was co-founded in Santa Monica, California by British author and activist Derek Humphry, his wife Ann Wickett Humphry and Gerald A. Larue. It relocated to Oregon in 1988 and, according to Humphry, had several homes over the course of its life.

The Hemlock Society's primary mission included providing information to the dying and supporting legislation permitting physician-assisted suicide. Its motto was "Good Life, Good Death".

In 2003, the national organization renamed itself End of Life Choices. In 2004, former members of the Hemlock Society Derek Humphry and Faye Girsh, founded the Final Exit Network, after Humphry's 1991 book of the same name. In 2004, End-of-Life Choices merged with Compassion in Dying, which became Compassion & Choices. Several local and state organizations, including the Hemlock Society of Florida and the Hemlock Society of San Diego, have retained the Hemlock Society name. Others, such as the Hemlock Society of Illinois (Final Options Illinois), have changed their names.

== Name ==
According to former president Faye Girsh, the Hemlock Society was founded in 1980 and was named in reference to Socrates' decision to end his life by drinking hemlock rather than continuing an existence he found intolerable. In the fifth century B.C., Socrates was convicted of corrupting the youth of Athens by encouraging ideas seen as subversive. Though he was sentenced to be executed, Socrates could have escaped into exile, but nevertheless chose death, an act seen as dignified and noble by many supporters of assisted suicide.

== History ==
Earlier right-to-die advocacy organizations included the Euthanasia Educational Council founded in 1967, changing its name to Concern for Dying in 1978.

The Hemlock Society was started in 1980 after the success of Derek Humphry's book Jean's Way (1978), which recounted how Humphry assisted his wife in committing suicide on 29 March 1975 after a long battle with cancer. Due to the success of Jean's Way, Humphry had received many letters from people asking for information about assisted suicide. He decided to start the Hemlock Society in an effort to campaign for a change in law and educate the terminally ill on assisted suicide and its methods. Initially started in Humphry's garage in Santa Monica, California, the group eventually moved to Eugene, Oregon, and had many other homes.

Let Me Die Before I Wake, Humphry's book on the methods of assisted suicide, was originally published for members of the Hemlock Society. Due to demand for the book, it was published for the market in 1982 and became part of the foundation for the Hemlock Society's reputation and income. In 1991, Humphry published Final Exit, subtitled "The Practicalities of Self-Deliverance and Assisted Suicide for the Dying". The book was a bestseller, though there were calls to ban it. After the success of Final Exit, Humphry left the Hemlock Society and started Euthanasia Research and Guidance Organization in 1992.

The Society was a founding charter member of the World Federation of Right to Die Societies, which began in 1980 in Oxford, England, and was led by Sidney D. Rosoff and Humphry.

The Hemlock Society's national membership grew to include 40,000 individuals and eighty chapters.

The Society backed legislative efforts in California, Washington, Michigan, and Maine without success until the Oregon Death with Dignity Act was passed on October 27, 1997.

Past Hemlock Society USA presidents included Gerald A. Larue, Derek Humphry, Sidney D. Rosoff, Wiley Morrison, Arthur Metcalfe, John Westover, Faye J. Girsh. Past executive directors included Derek Humphry (acting 1980–1992), Cheryl K. Smith (1992–1993), John A. Pridonoff (1993–1995), Helen Voorhis (acting 1995–1996), and Faye J. Girsh (1996–2000).

== In the media ==
In the 2010 television film You Don’t Know Jack, which dramatizes the activism of former Oakland County, Michigan pathologist Jack Kevorkian, fellow activist Janet Good (played by Susan Sarandon) meets Kevorkian (played by Al Pacino) during a meeting of the eastern Michigan chapter of the Hemlock Society which Good had organized.

== See also ==
- Compassion & Choices
- Oregon Death with Dignity Act
- Right to Die
- World Federation of Right to Die Societies

== Bibliography ==
- Colt, George Howe (1991). The Enigma of Suicide. New York: Summit Books. ISBN 978-0671509965.
- Côté, Richard N (2008). In search of gentle death : the fight for your right to die with dignity. Mt. Pleasant, S.C.: Corinthian Books. ISBN 978-1929175369.
- Cox, Donald W. (1993). Hemlock's Cup: The Struggle for Death With Dignity. Prometheus Books. ISBN 978-0879758080.
- Dowbiggin, Ian (2003). A Merciful End: The Euthanasia Movement in America. Oxford; New York: Oxford University Press. ISBN 978-0198035152.
- Filene, Peter G. (1998). In The Arms of Others: A Cultural History of the Right-to-Die in America. Chicago: Ivan R. Dee. p. 196. ISBN 978-1566631884.
- Glick, Henry R. (1992). The Right to Die: Policy Innovation and Its Consequences. New York: Columbia University Press. ISBN 978-0231076388.
- Hillyard, Daniel; Dombrink, John (2001). Dying Right: The Death With Dignity Movement. New York: Routledge. ISBN 978-0415927987.
- Farewell to Hemlock: Killed by its name, an essay by Derek Humphry 21 February 2005
- Humphry, Derek (2008). Good Life, Good Death – Memoir of a writer who became a euthanasia advocate. Junction City, Oregon: Norris Lane Press. ISBN 978-0976828334.
- Putnam, Constance E. (2002). Hospice or Hemlock? Searching for Heroic Compassion. Westport, Connecticut: Praeger. ISBN 978-0897899215.
- Wanzer, Sidney, MD; Glenmullen, Joseph, MD (2007). To Die Well. Your Right to Comfort, Calm and Choices in the Last Days of Your Life. Cambridge, Massachusetts: Lifelong Books/Da Capo Press, Merloyd Lawrence Books. ISBN 978-0738210834.
