= Concern for Dying =

American pro-euthanasia organization

The Euthanasia Educational Fund was established by of the Euthanasia Society of America in 1967 as a tax-exempt organization under US law. It later renamed itself the Euthanasia Educational Council in 1972, and Concern for Dying in 1978. The last name change was due to popular misconception that euthanasia referred to so-called "mercy killing", which the society opposed.

Concern for Dying promoted right to die legislation in several US states, as well as promoting the idea of a living will and other legal measures supporting the right to die. By the 1980s the organization became one of the biggest groups promoting voluntary euthanasia in the US, alongside the Society for the Right to Die.

The organization is currently defunct.
