= World Federation of Right to Die Societies =

Federation of voluntary euthanasia associations

The World Federation of Right to Die Societies is an international federation of associations that promote access to voluntary assisted dying. It holds regular international meetings on dying and death.

The World Federation, founded in 1980, consists of 64 right to die organizations from 30+ countries. The Federation provides an international link for organizations working to secure or protect the rights of individuals to self-determination at the end of their lives.

== World Right to Die Day ==
World Right to Die Day is celebrated November 2 in countries such as France, Italy, Mexico, New Zealand, and Venezuela. The celebration was founded in France at the World Federation Conference in 2008 and has since spread. The participating countries vary in their customs of celebration. This day also falls within the celebration of Dia De Los Muertos in Mexico and is represented in the bigger cities as part of their celebration.

== Controversy ==
Cases of people choosing assisted dying have been met with some controversy in the media and public. One famous case is that of Brittany Maynard. She was diagnosed with a terminal brain cancer and chose to end her life, but before doing so, she chose to speak out about her situation and her choice, thus opening up the debate about the right-to-die movement in America.

Controversy also lies in issues regarding whether or not the right to die should be granted to those who are in a minimally conscious state (MCS). MCS refers to people who have suffered neurological damage and will never fully recover, but still have some awareness.

Groups such as Not Dead Yet fight against the movement to legalize and promote the right to die. They worry that if assisted dying is legalized, seniors and people with disabilities will be pressured against their will into accepting it.

However, there is no international evidence available that supports this assertion.

Additionally, controversy has also surfaced amongst right-to-die societies themselves. For example, the well-known organization in the worldwide movement Exit International publisher of the Peaceful Pill Handbook, was granted admission to the World Federation by 2018 but not without some opposition. Within just a few years it had decided not to renew its membership. Tensions appear to lie between societies that advance all options to a reliable, peaceful and painless death such as Exit International, Final Exit Network in the US, and Right to Die Society Canada for example, and most other member societies that only advocate for a medical model regulated by legislation with restrictive eligibility criteria. In keeping with the declared human right that all should have access to assisted dying, the former argue for greater inclusiveness of all persons seeking this remedy even if not gravely ill, while also noting the limitations and exclusions under limited medical assistance (MAID) or physician-assisted dying (PAD) in all jurisdictions where it has evolved. Persons preferring not to involve doctors and other professionals in this personal, final act should similarly not be denied knowledge and support without threats of criminal prosecution.

== Member organizations ==
=== Africa ===
- South Africa: Dignity South Africa - Legalise Assisted Dying | my life ~ my choice
- South Africa: SAVES - The Living Will Society
- Zimbabwe: Final Exit Zimbabwe

=== Asia ===
- Hong Kong: Eternity Living Life Company Limited Hong Kong
- Japan: Japan Society for Dying with Dignity (JSDD)
- Nepal: Soch Nepal, Society for Humanism
- South Korea: Korea Association of Right to Die (KARD)

=== Europe ===
- Belgium: Association pour le Droit de Mourir dans la Dignité (ADMD-B)
- Belgium: R.W.S. vzw (Recht op Waardig Sterven vzw)
- Denmark: Landsforeningen En Værdig Død
- Europe: Right to Die Europe, RtD-E
- Finland: EXITUS ry
- France: Association pour le Droit de Mourir dans la Dignité (ADMD-F)
- France: Le Choix, Citoyens pour une mort choisie
- France: AAVIVRE
- Germany: Dignitas (Sektion Deutschland) e.V. DIGNITATE, DGHS e.V.
- Ireland: End of Life Ireland
- Italy: EXIT - Italia
- Italy: Libera Uscita
- Luxembourg: Association pour le Droit de Mourir dans la Dignité (ADMD-L)
- Netherlands: De Einder
- Netherlands: NVVE, Right to Die - NL
- Norway: Foreningen Retten til en Verdig Død
- Scotland: Friends at the End (FATE)
- Spain: Asociación Federal Derecho a Morir Dignamente (AFDMD)
- Sweden: Rätten Till en Värdig Död (RTVD)
- Switzerland: Dignitas
- Switzerland: EXIT Association pour le Droit de Mourir dans la Dignité (Suisse Romande)
- Switzerland: EXIT-Deutsche Schweiz
- Switzerland: Lifecircle
- United Kingdom: My Death My Decision

=== Middle East ===
- Israel: The Israel Society To live and die with dignity

=== North America ===
- Canada: Association Québécoise pour le Droit de Mourir dans la Dignité (AQDMD)
- Canada: Dying with Dignity (DWDC)
- Canada: Farewell Foundation (retired in Oct 2016, restoration in progress in 2024)
- Canada: Right to Die Society of Canada
- United States: AUTONOMY
- United States: Euthanasia Research & Guidance Organization (ERGO)
- United States: Final Exit Network
- United States: Hemlock Society of Florida, Inc
- United States: Hemlock Society of San Diego

=== Oceania ===
- Australia: Christians Supporting Choice for Voluntary Euthanasia
- Australia: Dying with Dignity NSW
- Australia: Dying with Dignity Queensland
- Australia: Dying With Dignity Tasmania (Inc.)
- Australia: Dying With Dignity Victoria
- Australia: Northern Territory Voluntary Euthanasia Society
- Australia: South Australian Voluntary Euthanasia Society
- Australia: Dying With Dignity Western Australia(Inc)
- New Zealand: End-of-Life Choice Society of New Zealand Inc

=== South America ===
- Brazil: Eu Decido
- Colombia: Laboratorio de Derechos Económicos, Sociales y Culturales (DescLAB)
- Colombia: Fundacion Pro Derecho a Morir Dignamente (DMD Colombia)
- Venezuela: Derecho a Morir con Dignidad (DMD Venezuela)

== See also ==
- Final Exit book by Derek Humphry
- Assisted suicide
- Compassion & Choices (right-to-die organization)
- Death with Dignity National Center
- Dignity in Dying
- Dignitas
- Exit
- Final Exit Network
- Exit International
- My Death, My Decision
