= Final Exit =

1991 book by Derek Humphry

Final Exit: The Practicalities of Self-Deliverance and Assisted Suicide for the Dying
- Author: Derek Humphry
- Language: English
- Subject: Self-euthanasia
- Publisher: Dell
- Publication date: 1991
- Publication place: United States
- Media type: Print
- Pages: 213
- ISBN: 0-440-50488-0
- OCLC: 26465758
- Preceded by: Jean's Way

Final Exit: The Practicalities of Self-Deliverance and Assisted Suicide for the Dying, often shortened to just Final Exit, is a 1991 book written by Derek Humphry, a British-born American journalist, author, and assisted suicide advocate who co-founded the (defunct) Hemlock Society in 1980 and co-founded the Final Exit Network in 2004. The book was published in 1991 by the Hemlock Society US in hardback. The following year, its 2nd edition was published by Dell in trade paperback. An updated edition was published in 2010.

The book, often described as a "suicide manual", describes the means that the terminally ill may use to end their lives. The book outlines relevant laws, techniques, and living wills. Final Exit was perceived as controversial, and it drove debate regarding the right to die. Another concern was that people who were mentally ill could use information in the book to end their lives. Despite the controversy, Final Exit reached #1 on The New York Times Best Seller list in August 1991.

Final Exit Network claims that approximately 750,000 copies have been sold in the United States and Canada and approximately 500,000 elsewhere. The book is banned in France. Final Exit is Derek Humphry's third book on the subject of self-euthanasia; it was preceded by Jean's Way (1978) and The Right to Die: Understanding Euthanasia (1986).

== Success of the book ==
In 1991, Final Exit spent 18 weeks on The New York Times non-fiction Best Seller list, it reached #1 in August and was selected by USA Today in 2007 as one of the 25 most influential books of the quarter century.

It has been translated into 12 languages. The original English language version is in its third edition.

In 2000, Derek Humphry recorded a VHS video version of the information in the book; a DVD version and a Kindle version were released in 2006 and 2011, respectively. A 4th edition, Final Exit 2020, was released as an ebook.

The ethicist Peter Singer included it on a list of his top ten books in The Guardian.

It has been alleged that members of the Heaven's Gate cult used information from Humphry's book in order to commit mass suicide. In response, Humphry said, "It's as bad as someone going into a gun shop and purchasing guns for self-defense or target practice and then using them for mass murder."

Based on the law criminalizing incitement to suicide, the Paris Court of Appeal convicted Jean-Marie Colombani, editor-in-chief of the newspaper Le Monde, in 2001 on the grounds that a brief article in the magazine Colors, a supplement to the newspaper, explained how to obtain the book.

== Reception ==
Final Exit has been a frequent target of censors; the book appears on the American Library Association list of the 100 Most Frequently Challenged Books of 1990–1999 at number 29.

== See also ==
- Euthanasia device
- Final Exit Network
- Suicide
- Suicide methods
- The Complete Manual of Suicide by Wataru Tsurumi
- The Peaceful Pill Handbook by Philip Nitschke

== Bibliography ==
- Docker, Chris "Five Last Acts II and The Exit Path"
- Humphry, Derek (1991). Final Exit: The Practicalities of Self-Deliverance and Assisted Suicide for the Dying. ISBN 0-9606030-3-4.
- Humphry, Derek (2000). Supplement to Final Exit. ISBN 978-0-9637280-3-6
- Humphry, Derek (2002). Final Exit: The Practicalities of Self-Deliverance and Assisted Suicide for the Dying, 3rd edition. ISBN 0-385-33653-5. Delta Trade Paperback. Revised and updated.
- Humphry, Derek (2002). Let Me Die Before I Wake & Supplement to Final Exit. ISBN 978-1-4011-0286-9
- Humphry, Derek (2008) Good Life, Good Death: Memoir of an investigative reporter and pro-choice advocate. Hardcopy and eBook. ISBN 978-0-9768283-3-4
- Smith, Dinitia (January 6, 1992). The Happy Hawker: Tyro Publisher Steven Schragis's Genius for Promoting Schlock. Vol. 25. pp. 40–46. ISSN 0028-7369.
- Sutherland, John (2008) Curiosities of Literature
