= Derek Humphry =

British-American euthanasia activist and writer (1930–2025)

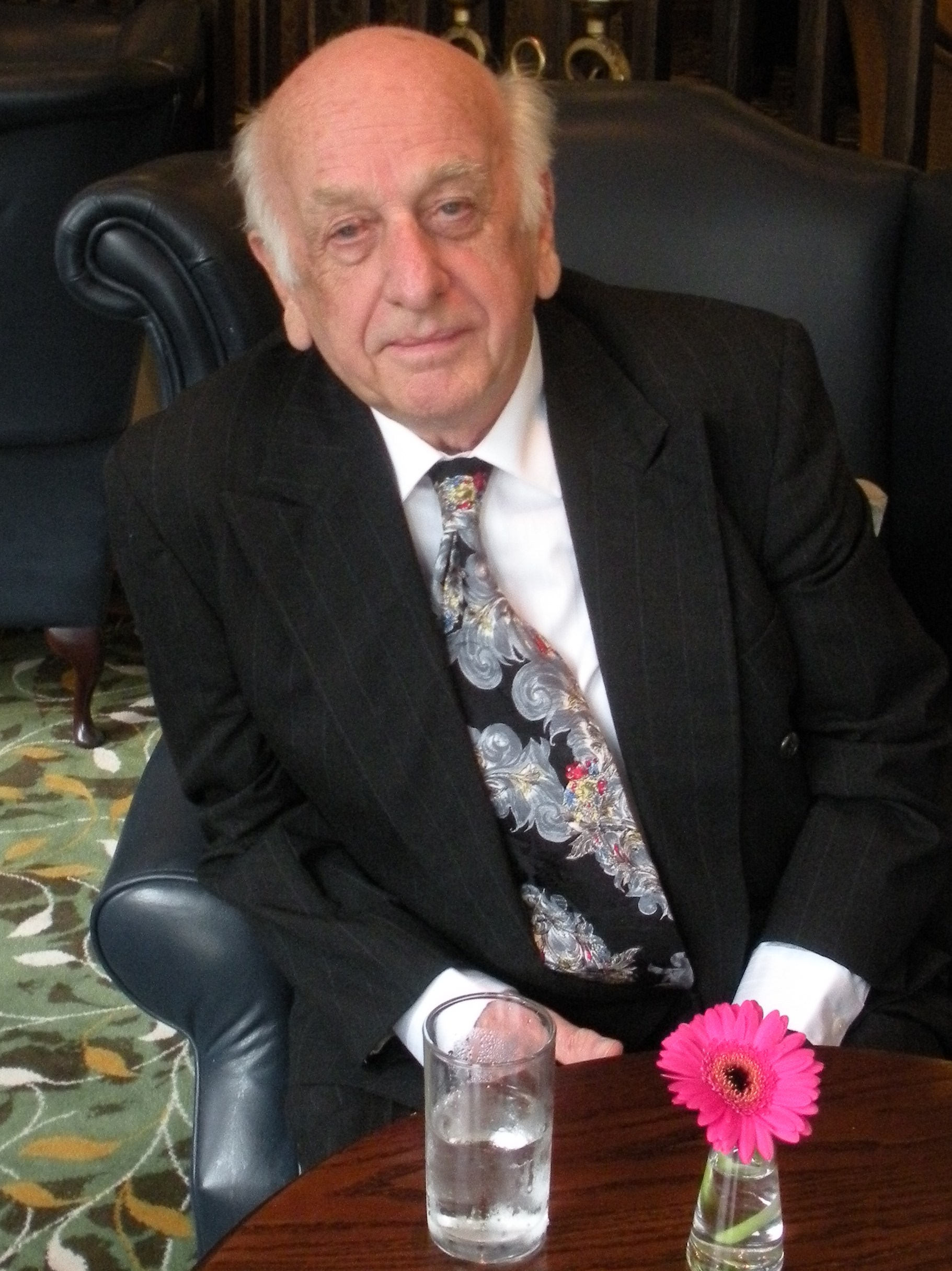
- Humphry in 2012
- Born: 29 April 1930; Bath, England
- Died: 2 January 2025 (aged 94); Eugene, Oregon, U.S.: British; American
- Occupations: Journalist; author
- Writing career
- Notable awards: Martin Luther King Memorial Prize (1972); Saba Prize (2000)
- Website: www.finalexit.org/about_derek_humphry.html

Derek Humphry (29 April 1930 – 2 January 2025) was a British and American journalist and author. He was a proponent of legal assisted suicide and the right to die. In 1980 he co-founded the Hemlock Society and in 2004 after the Society dissolved, he co-founded Final Exit Network. From 1988 to 1990 he was president of the World Federation of Right to Die Societies. As of 2007 he was the president of the Euthanasia Research & Guidance Organization (ERGO).

Humphry was the author of the related books Jean's Way (1978), The Right to Die: Understanding Euthanasia (1986), and Final Exit: The Practicalities of Self-Deliverance and Assisted Suicide for the Dying (1991).

== Early life ==
Born in Bath to an English father and an Irish mother, Humphry was raised in the Mendip Hills of Somerset. His education was slender because of a broken home followed by World War II, when many English schools were in chaos, finally leaving at the age of 15, when he became a messenger boy for the Yorkshire Post. In a 30-year journalistic career, Humphry worked and wrote for the Bristol Evening World, the Manchester Evening News, the Daily Mail, the Sunday Times and, lastly, the Los Angeles Times.

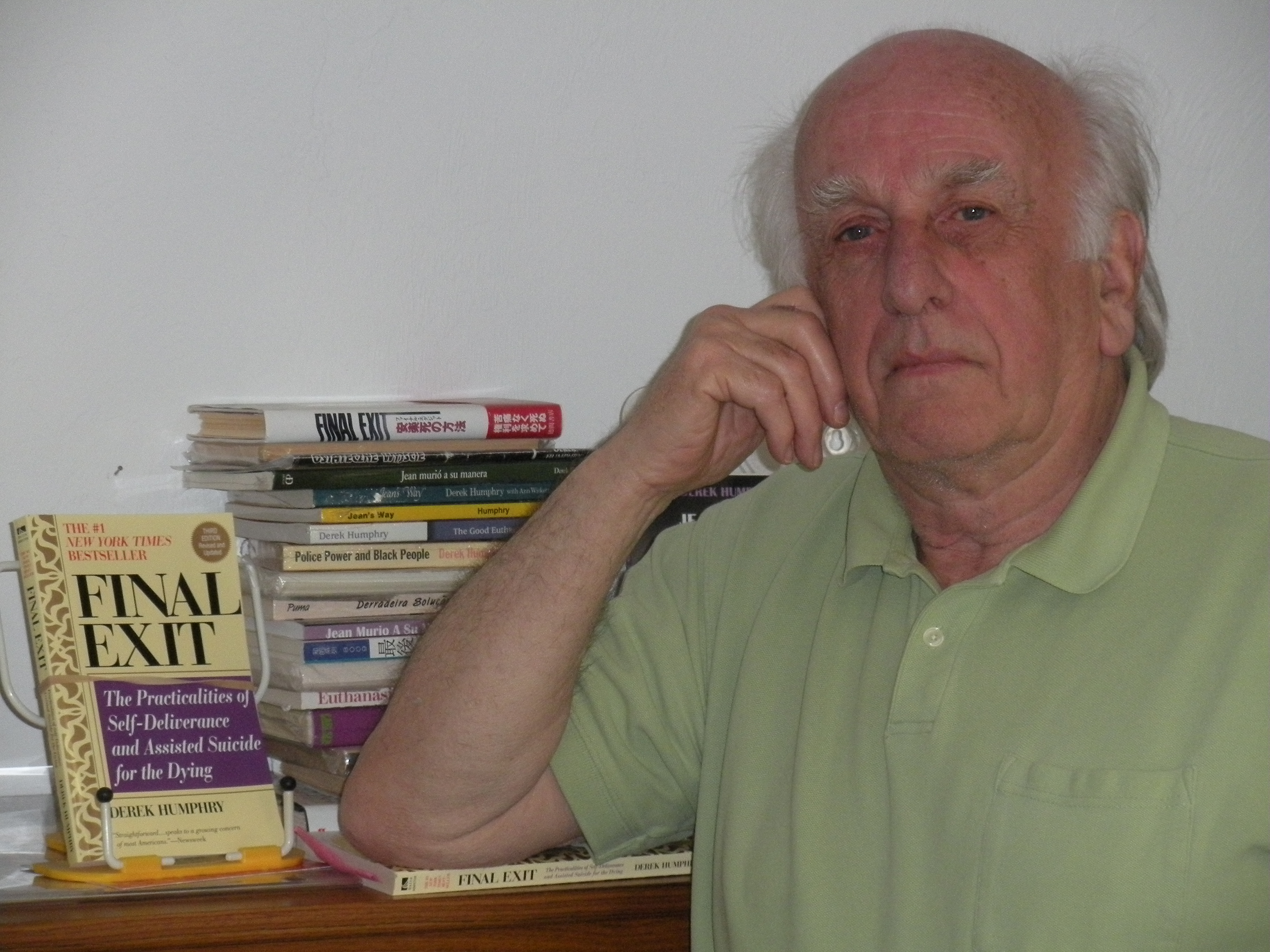
Humphry in 2009

Humphry was a dual British and American citizen.

Humphry died of congestive heart failure, in Eugene, Oregon, on 2 January 2025, aged 94.

== Affiliations ==
Humphry was an advisor to the World Federation of Right to Die Societies by virtue of his past presidency and in appreciation of his 26 years of involvement with that organization. From when it was founded in 2004, Humphry was an adviser to the Final Exit Network. After four members of the organization were accused in Georgia of assisting a suicide, he launched the Final Exit Liberty Fund which paid most of their legal costs.

In 2014, Humphry was given the Lifetime Achievement Award by the World Federation of Right To Die Societies for "contributing so much, so long and so courageously to our right to a peaceful death." The award was presented by the organization's president, Faye Girsh, at its 20th international conference in Chicago in 2014. It was the first time this award had been made.

== Books and publications ==
Humphry was newsletter editor for the World Federation of Right to Die Societies for a number of years.

As of 2016, the paperback Final Exit was in print in English, Spanish and Italian. It has sold more than one million copies in twelve languages since 1991. In April 2007 the editors and book critics of USA Today selected Final Exit as one of the most memorable 25 books of the last quarter century. In 2017 he published his life story, Good Life, Good Death: The Memoir of a Right To Die Pioneer (Carrel Books, New York. ISBN 978-1631440663)

The film Nomadland, which won three Oscars in 2021, mentions Final Exit, but incorrectly attributes the book to Jack Kevorkian.

Derek Humphry's books, manuscripts, papers and documents are archived at Special Collections, Allen Library, University of Washington, Seattle, Washington.

== Personal life and death ==
His first wife, Jean Humphry, ended her life on 29 March 1975, in the Cotswolds with her husband at her side, with an intentional overdose of medication; she was suffering from terminal bone cancer. Humphry told the story from his perspective in the best-selling Jean's Way. Derek and Jean Humphry had three sons, the youngest one an adoptee.

Humphry wrote the 1991 suicide handbook, Final Exit. From 1993 Humphry was the president of the Euthanasia Research & Guidance Organization (ERGO), and chaired the advisory board of the Final Exit Network (formed 2004 to replace the Hemlock Society dissolved the previous year in mergers).

His marriage to his next wife, Ann Wickett, an American and a co-founder of the Hemlock Society, ended in 1989 when she filed for divorce; they had no children. In 1991, Ann also died by suicide. In her suicide note, she told Humphry, "Ever since I was diagnosed as having cancer, you have done everything conceivable to precipitate my death. . . . What you did—desertion and abandonment and subsequent harassment of a dying woman—is so unspeakable there are no words to describe the horror of it."

In early 1990, Humphry married Gretchen Crocker, youngest daughter of an Oregon farming family.

== Bibliography ==
- Because They're Black (with Gus John; 1972), ISBN 978-0140216240; awarded the Martin Luther King Memorial Prize
- Police Power and Black People (with a commentary by Gus John; 1973), ISBN 978-0586037317
- Passport and Politics (with Michael Ward; 1974), ISBN 978-0140523096
- The Cricket Conspiracy (1975), National Council for Civil Liberties, ISBN 0-901108-40-5
- False Messiah: The Story of Michael X (1977), ISBN 978-0246108845
- Jean's Way: A Love Story (1978), ISBN 0-9637280-7-5
- Let Me Die Before I Wake (1982)
- The Right to Die: Understanding Euthanasia (1986), ISBN 0-9606030-9-3
- Final Exit: The Practicalities of Self-deliverance and Assisted Suicide for the Dying (1991, updated 2002, 3rd edition), ISBN 0-385-33653-5
- Lawful Exit: The Limits of Freedom for Help in Dying (1993), ISBN 0-9637280-0-8
- Dying with Dignity (1992), ISBN 0-517-14342-9
- Freedom to Die: People, Politics & The Right-To-Die Movement (1998), ISBN 0-9637280-1-6
- Let Me Die Before I Wake (& Supplement to Final Exit; 2002), ISBN 1-4011-0286-7
- The Good Euthanasia Guide: Where, What & Who in Choices in Dying (2006), ISBN 0-9637280-8-3
- Good Life, Good Death: The Memoir of a Right To Die Pioneer, ISBN 978-1631440663

== See also ==
- George Exoo
- Philip Nitschke
