= Assisted dying in the United Kingdom =

Assisted dying in the United Kingdom may refer to:

- Assisted suicide in the United Kingdom, legal, historical and social situation regarding assisted suicide in the United Kingdom
- Euthanasia in the United Kingdom, legal, historical and social situation regarding euthanasia in the United Kingdom

== Bills ==
- Assisted Dying (Jersey) Law 202- (Jersey)
- Assisted Dying Bill 2023 (Isle of Man)
- Assisted Dying for Terminally Ill Adults (Scotland) Bill
- Terminally Ill Adults (End of Life) Bill
