= All-Party Parliamentary Group for Choice at the End of Life =

UK parliamentary group

The All-Party Parliamentary Group for Choice at the End of Life is a cross-party group of members of the British Parliament and Peers that supports better end-of-life options, including assisted dying. They believe that, subject to legal safeguards, terminally-ill adult patients should have the option of an assisted death in their final stages of life.

In 2012, this APPG launched a draft a bill for assisted dying which was presented to the House of Lords by Lord Falconer in 2013. The proposed bill was debated in 2014 but ran out of time in the run up to the 2015 general election. A version of the bill tabled by Rob Marris was eventually voted on and defeated in the House of Commons in September 2015.

The APPG is currently chaired by Labour MP Karin Smyth.

It was formerly chaired by Independent MP Nick Boles, who stood down at the 2019 General Election. Boles had faced a potentially life-threatening illness before supporting the campaign. Prior to this, the APPG was chaired by Kit Malthouse MP who called the campaign "the great human rights campaign of our political generation".

The secretariat is provided by the non-profit assisted dying campaign group Dignity in Dying.

== APPG Chair and Vice Chairs ==
Officers (as at 24 February 2020)
Role	Name	Party
Chair & Registered Contact	Karin Smyth	Labour
Vice Chair	Lucy Allan	Conservative
Vice Chair	Paul Blomfield	Labour
Vice Chair	Stuart C McDonald	Scottish National Party
Vice Chair	Christine Jardine	Liberal Democrat
Vice Chair	Ben Lake	Plaid Cymru
Vice Chair	Caroline Lucas	Green Party
Vice Chair	Baroness Meacher	Crossbench

== See also ==
- Assisted Dying Bill 2023 (Isle of Man)
- Assisted Dying (Jersey) Law 202- (Jersey)
- Assisted Dying for Terminally Ill Adults (Scotland) Bill
- Assisted suicide in the United Kingdom
- Euthanasia in the United Kingdom
- Right to die
- Terminally Ill Adults (End of Life) Bill
