= Michael Irwin =

British doctor and activist (born 1931)

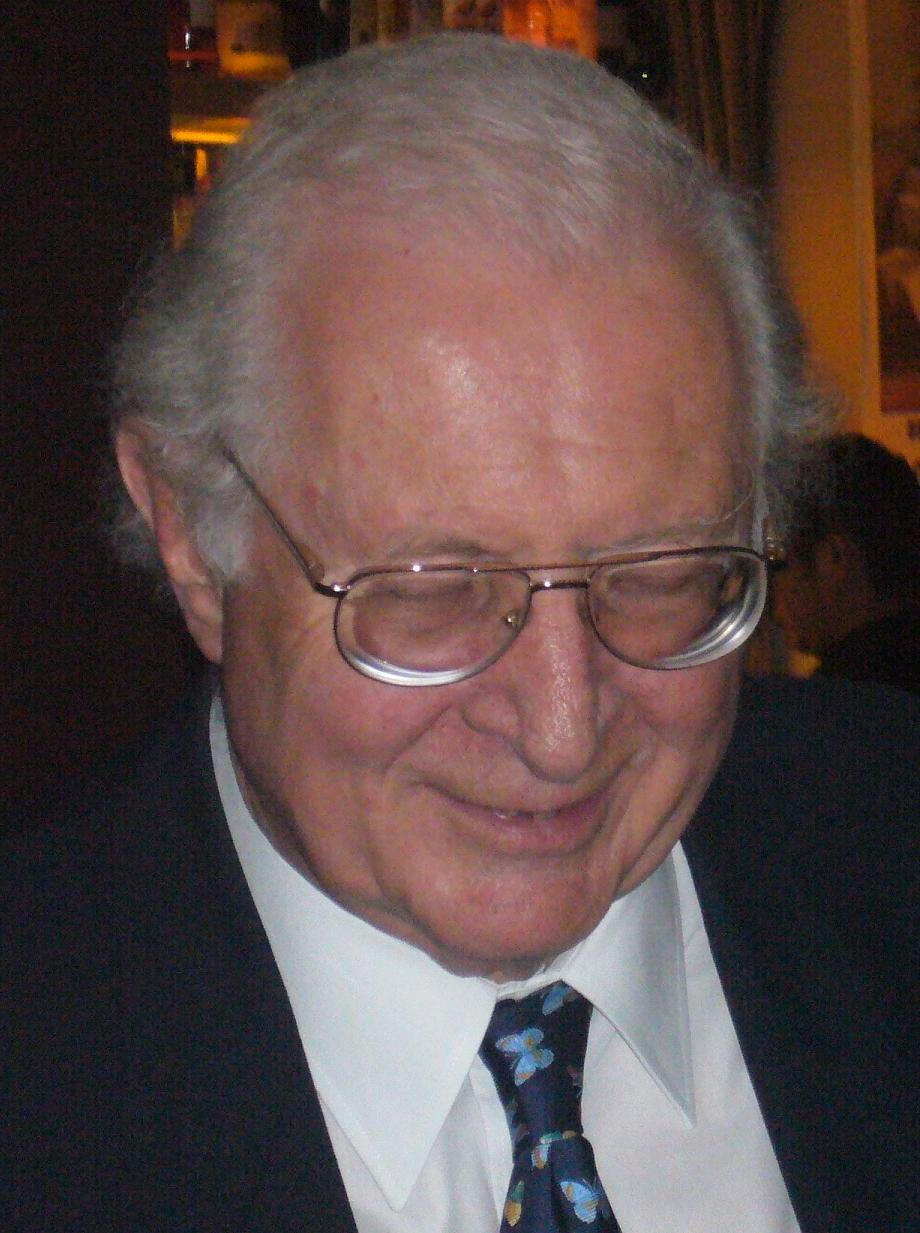
Michael Irwin

Michael Henry Knox Irwin (born 5 June 1931) is a British doctor, formerly a GP and a Medical Director with the United Nations. He is a humanist and secular activist, campaigning in particular for voluntary euthanasia and doctor-assisted suicide.

== Career ==
Irwin was trained at St. Bartholomew's Hospital Medical College, London (graduating in 1955), and at Columbia University, New York. He was awarded a master's degree in public health from the latter in 1960.

He worked at Prince of Wales Hospital, London, from 1955 to 1956. In 1957 he became Medical Officer at the United Nations. In 1961 he worked with the UN in Pakistan, returning to his Medical Officer post in 1963 and rising to become Medical Director of the United Nations in 1969. He became Director of Personnel at the United Nations Development Programme in 1973. In 1977, he was the UNICEF Representative in Bangladesh. From 1980 to 1982, Irwin was the UNICEF Senior Adviser on Childhood Disabilities. In 1982, he returned to the United Nations to become Medical Director again. In 1989 and 1990, he was the Medical Director for the World Bank and the IMF.

He was struck off by the UK General Medical Council in 2005 after openly admitting travelling to the Isle of Man in October 2003 to assist fellow campaigner Patrick Kneen to end his life. Irwin was arrested by the Isle of Man police for this activity in December 2003, but he was never charged.

In April 1990 Irwin resigned from the World Bank. He wrote an article for The Wall Street Journal which detailed his complaints about the Bank. He cited in particular "the Bank's bloated, overpaid bureaucracy, its wasteful practices, and its generally poor management."

Returning to the UK in 1993, Irwin became the Vice-Chairman of the United Nations Association in 1995, and its chairman from 1996 to 1998.

== Campaigning ==
Irwin is an active supporter of assisted dying, humanism and secularism. He was interviewed by Ritula Shah about such matters in the BBC Radio 4 series One to One on 21 May 2013.

=== Assisted dying ===
From 1995 to 2003, Irwin was either the vice-chairman or the Chairman of the Voluntary Euthanasia Society (now named Dignity in Dying).

On the 25th November 1999 Irwin stood as a "Campaign for Living Will Legislation" candidate in the Kensington and Chelsea parliamentary by-election occasioned by the death of MP Alan Clark. Irwin gained 97 votes, putting him 9th out of 18 candidates. Michael Portillo was elected.

Irwin was President of the World Federation of Right to Die Societies from 2002 to 2004, and a Director of that organisation from 2004 to 2006.

In December 2009, Irwin established the Society for Old Age Rational Suicide (SOARS) which is promoting a discussion on the possibility of elderly, competent individuals, who are suffering from various medical problems, having a doctor legally end their lives, if this is their persistent request. From 2009 to August 2015 he was the Coordinator of this organisation. In October 2015 he was made a Patron of SOARS (now renamed My Death, My Decision).

Since 2005 Irwin has accompanied four individuals from the UK to Switzerland to witness their doctor-assisted suicides there. In 2009, he was arrested for partially financing the trip of Raymond Cutkelvin to Dignitas. After a year on bail, he was not charged.

=== Secularism and humanism ===
Irwin is a patron of Humanists UK and an honorary associate of the National Secular Society.

Since 2005 Irwin has sponsored the National Secular Society's £5000 Secularist of the Year award, which is known as the Irwin Prize. In 2006 he founded the Secular Medical Forum and was its Coordinator for three years.

On 15 September 2010, Irwin, along with 54 other public figures, signed an open letter published in The Guardian, stating their opposition to Pope Benedict XVI's state visit to the UK.

== Personal life ==
Irwin's father was William Knox Irwin FRCS, a surgeon and author of medical textbooks. Michael Irwin married Elizabeth Naumann in 1958; the marriage was dissolved in 1982. He married Frederica Harlow in 1983. He later married Patricia Walters in 1994 – they divorced in 2000. His current partner is Angela Farmer. He has three daughters.

== See also ==
- Assisted suicide in the United Kingdom
- Euthanasia in the United Kingdom

== Publications ==
=== Collected essays (editor) ===
- "I'll See Myself Out, Thank You": Thirty personal views in support of assisted suicide. Skyscraper Publications, 2015

=== "Family Doctor" booklets ===
- Travelling Without Tears. London: British Medical Association, 1964. pp. 30.
- The Truth About Cancer. London: British Medical Association, 1969. pp. 31.

=== Public affairs pamphlets ===
- Check-ups: safeguarding your health. no.314. New York: Public Affairs Committee, 1961. pp. 18.
- Overweight: a problem for millions. no.364. New York: Public Affairs Committee, 1964. pp. 20.
- Blood: new uses for saving lives. no.377. New York: Public Affairs Committee, 1965. pp. 28.
- Viruses, Colds, and Flu. no.395. New York: Public Affairs Committee, 1966. pp. 20.
- What Do We Know About Allergies? no. 486. New York: Public Affairs Committee, 1972. pp. 28.
- Overweight: a problem for millions. Revised edition. no.364a. New York: Public Affairs Committee, 1973. pp. 24.
- Aspirin: current knowledge about an old medication. no. 614. New York: Public Affairs Committee, 1983. pp. 24.
- Can We Survive Nuclear War? no.625. New York: Public Affairs Committee, 1984. pp. 28.
- Nuclear Energy, Good or Bad? no.629. New York: Public Affairs Committee, 1984. pp. 29.
- Risks to Health and Safety on the Job. no. 644. New York: Public Affairs Committee, 1986. pp. 28.

=== Criticism of the World Bank ===
- Banking on Poverty: An Insider's Look at the World Bank, Cato Foreign Policy Briefing 3, 20 September 1990.. Reprinted as Chapter 31 of Danaher, Kevin (1994). 50 Years is Enough: the case against the World Bank and the International Monetary Fund. Boston, MA: South End Press. pp. 152–160.
