= Assisted Dying for Terminally Ill Adults (Scotland) Bill =

Proposed legislation in Scotland

- Bill
- Scottish Parliament
- Long title: A Bill of the Scottish Parliament to provide for the lawful provision to terminally ill adults of assistance to voluntarily end their own lives; and for connected purposes.
- Introduced by: Liam McArthur MSP

Status: Not passed

History of passage through the Parliament

The Assisted Dying for Terminally Ill Adults (Scotland) Bill was a Scottish Parliament Member's Bill which proposed to legalise assisted suicide for terminally ill adults in Scotland. The bill was introduced by Liberal Democrat backbench MSP Liam McArthur in March 2024. The political parties in Parliament gave MSPs a free vote on the bill. On 17 March 2026 the bill failed to pass in a 69 to 57 against vote.

== Background and campaign ==
Assisted dying in Scots law might constitute murder, culpable homicide or no offence depending on the nature of the assistance. In 1980, the Scottish branch of the British Voluntary Euthanasia Society (now called Exit) broke off from its original society in order to publish How to Die with Dignity, which became the first publication of its kind in the world.

In a 2012 consultation on the Member's Bill proposed by MSP Margo MacDonald, 64% of the members of the public who choose to give comment on the issue rejected the proposals. A similar consultation by the Health and Sport Committee in 2014 came to a different conclusion, with 78% of responses by individuals being supportive of the proposals. Nevertheless, in 2015 a majority of MSPs including the first minister Alex Salmond voted against the bill in the Scottish Parliament, defeating it in its first stage.

In February 2019 a group of MSPs, including previous opponent Kezia Dugdale, formed to attempt to reform assisted dying law in the Scottish Parliament.

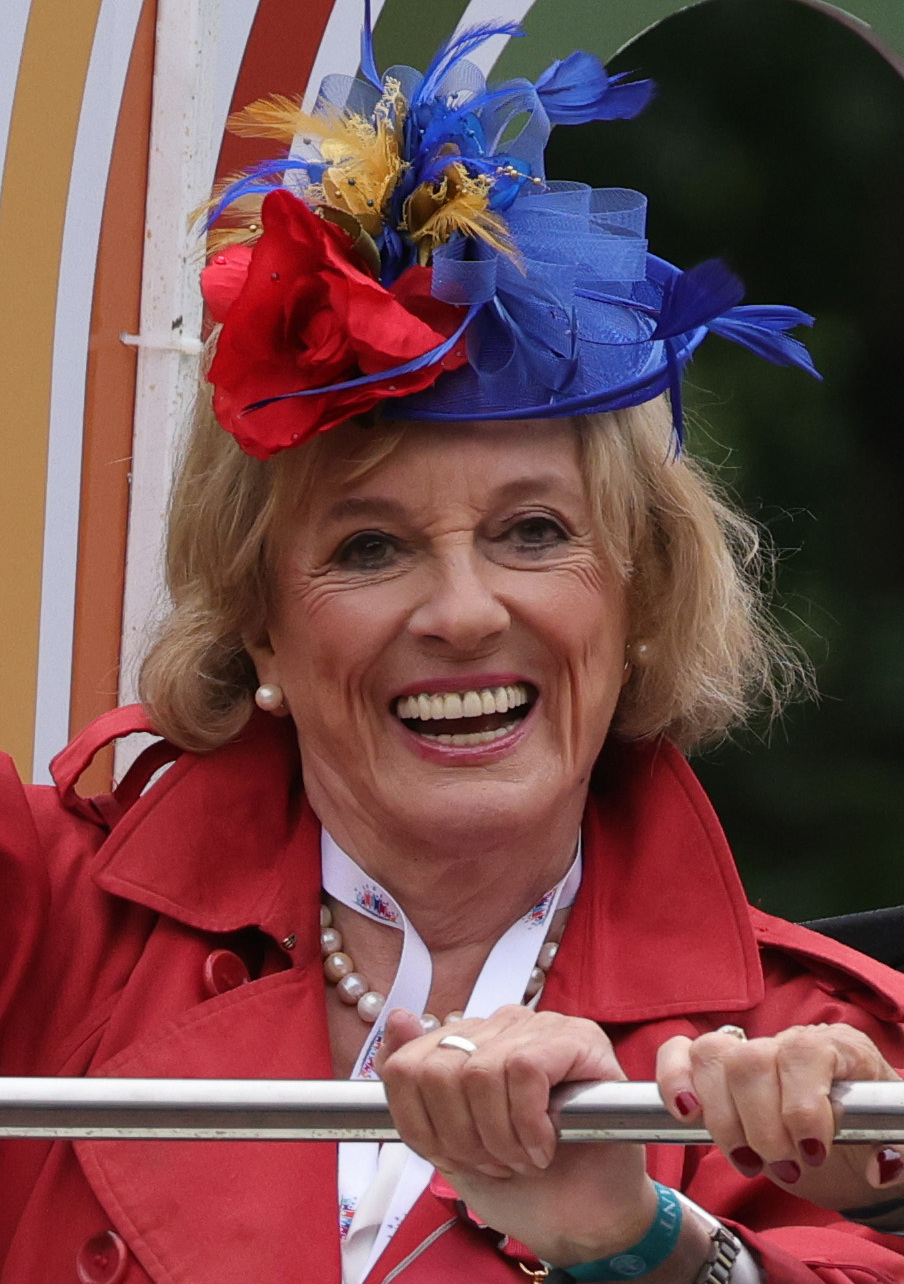
Dame Esther Rantzen is a high-profile campaigner in support of the Westminster bill.

On 19 December 2023, journalist and television presenter Dame Esther Rantzen, who has terminal lung cancer, said she joined the assisted suicide clinic Dignitas in Switzerland where it is legal and permits foreigners to use the service. This led to the leaders of the main political parties represented in the Westminster Parliament to say they would facilitate parliamentary time for a bill.

On 29 February 2024, the House of Commons Health and Social Care Select Committee published a report on assisted dying with chair Steve Brine (Conservative) saying that: "The inquiry on assisted dying and assisted suicide raised the most complex issues that we as a committee have faced, with strong feelings and opinions in the evidence we heard."

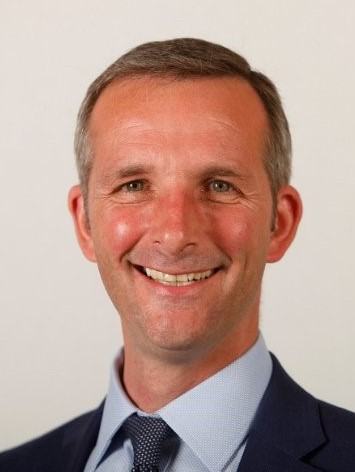
Liberal Democrat MSP Liam McArthur introduced the bill.

== Summary of the Bill ==
The bill (prior to committee) proposes to legalise assisted suicide for terminally ill adults aged 16 or older given that they meet these requirements:

- Must be a resident of Scotland and be registered with a GP for at least 12 months
- Mental capacity to make an informed decision free from coercion
- Expected to die within six months
- Make two independent declarations about their desire to die, which must be witnessed and signed
- Two doctors must be satisfied the person is eligible

== Parliamentary procedure ==
A cross-party working group which supported the legislation, included former Scottish Conservative leader Jackson Carlaw, as well as Scottish Greens co-leaders Patrick Harvie and Lorna Slater. The bill was voted down on 17 March 2026 in the Stage Three of the Parliamentary procedure.

=== Stage One: general principles ===
The bill received its Stage One debate on 13 May 2025. It was approved at Stage One by a majority of 70 votes to 56 for the bill, and 1 abstention, and 1 not voting. There was a vacancy in the parliament due to the recent death of Christina McKelvie (who had voted against a previous Assisted Dying bill).

=== Stage Two: changes to the Bill ===
The bill received its Stage Two debate on the 30 October 2025. It was approved at Stage Two by a majority of 70 votes to 31 for the bill, and 11 abstentions, and 17 not voting.

=== Stage Three: the bill's final changes and final vote ===
The bill received its Stage Three debate on 17 March 2026. It was voted down at Stage Three on the bill's final vote with 57 for, 69 against, 1 abstained and 2 did not vote. 12 MSPs who were previously for the bill in its first vote in Stage One of the Parliamentary procedure, voted against the bill in Stage Three's vote. This included 5 Conservatives, 4 SNP and 3 Labour MSPs.

The majority of Scottish National Party (SNP) and Liberal Democrats MSPs voted for the bill, as did all Scottish Greens MSPs. On the other hand, the majority of Scottish Conservatives and Scottish Labour MSPs voted against the bill, as did the sole Reform UK MSP.

Assisted Dying Bill (Scotland) – final vote
Party	Votes for	Votes against	Abstained	Did not vote
Conservative	6: Alexander Burnett; Jackson Carlaw; Sandesh Gulhane; Rachael Hamilton; Liam Kerr; Douglas Lumsden	22: Miles Briggs; Finlay Carson; Sharon Dowey; Tim Eagle; Russell Findlay; Murdo Fraser; Meghan Gallacher; Maurice Golden; Pam Gosal; Jamie Halcro Johnston; Craig Hoy; Stephen Kerr; Roz McCall; Edward Mountain; Oliver Mundell; Douglas Ross; Liz Smith; Alexander Stewart; Sue Webber; Annie Wells; Tess White; Brian Whittle	–	–
Labour	3: Katy Clark; Monica Lennon; Carol Mochan	17: Jackie Baillie; Claire Baker; Neil Bibby; Sarah Boyack; Rhoda Grant; Mark Griffin; Daniel Johnson; Richard Leonard; Michael Marra; Pauline McNeill; Paul O'Kane; Alex Rowley; Davy Russell; Anas Sarwar; Paul Sweeney; Mercedes Villalba; Martin Whitfield	–	–
Liberal Democrats	4: Alex Cole-Hamilton; Jamie Greene; Liam McArthur; Willie Rennie	1: Beatrice Wishart	–	–
SNP	37: George Adam; Karen Adam; Tom Arthur; Colin Beattie; Siobhian Brown; Stephanie Callaghan; Willie Coffey; Graeme Dey; Natalie Don-Innes; James Dornan; Jackie Dunbar; Jim Fairlie; Joe FitzPatrick; Kenneth Gibson; Jenny Gilruth; Christine Grahame; Emma Harper; Fiona Hyslop; Bill Kidd; Richard Lochhead; Gordon MacDonald; Rona Mackay; Ben Macpherson; Gillian Martin; Ivan McKee; Paul McLennan; Jenni Minto; Angus Robertson; Shona Robison; Shirley-Anne Somerville; Kaukab Stewart; Kevin Stewart; Michelle Thomson; Maree Todd; David Torrance; Evelyn Tweed; Elena Whitham	22: Clare Adamson; Alasdair Allan; Keith Brown; Angela Constance; Bob Doris; Annabelle Ewing; Kate Forbes; Mairi Gougeon; Clare Haughey; Jamie Hepburn; Fulton MacGregor; Ruth Maguire; Michael Matheson; Màiri McAllan; Stuart McMillan; Marie McNair; Audrey Nicoll; Emma Roddick; Collette Stevenson; Nicola Sturgeon; John Swinney; Humza Yousaf	1: Neil Gray	–
Green	7: Ariane Burgess; Maggie Chapman; Ross Greer; Patrick Harvie; Gillian Mackay; Mark Ruskell; Lorna Slater	–	–	–
Independent	–	6: Jeremy Balfour; Foysol Choudhury; Pam Duncan-Glancy; Fergus Ewing; John Mason; Ash Regan	–	1: Colin Smyth
Reform	–	1: Graham Simpson	–	–
No party affiliation (Presiding Officer)	–	–	–	1: Alison Johnstone
Total	57	69	1	2

== Debate ==
The Swinney government took a neutral stance on the bill, so Scottish National Party (SNP) MSPs had a free vote. John Swinney himself voted against the bill. The SNP's Depute Leader, Keith Brown voted against the bill at all three stages. Former SNP Depute Leader and former Leader of the SNP in the House of Commons, Angus Robertson voted in favour of the bill. Cabinet Secretary for Finance and Local Government and former Deputy First Minister of Scotland, Shona Robison voted for the bill. Former First Ministers Nicola Sturgeon and Humza Yousaf indicated they would vote against the bill. Deputy first minister of Scotland Kate Forbes said that she would vote against the bill. Shirley-Anne Somerville, the Cabinet Secretary for Social Justice declared her support for the bill in May 2025.

Anas Sarwar, the leader of Scottish Labour said that he would not support the bill. Labour MSPs were given a free vote on the bill. Labour MSP Pam Duncan-Glancy, the first permanent wheelchair user to be elected to Holyrood, was a major opponent of the bill.

Alex Cole-Hamilton, the leader of the Scottish Liberal Democrats, supported the bill.

Lorna Slater and Patrick Harvie, the co-leaders of the Scottish Greens, supported the bill.

Russell Findlay, the leader of the Scottish Conservatives, initially said he would cast his vote in favour. However, on 9 March 2026, Findlay withdrew his support for the bill. He subsequently voted against the bill on its final vote on 17 March 2026. Douglas Ross, the former leader of the Conservatives, revealed he would vote against the bill.

Ash Regan, the sole Alba MSP, said she would vote against the bill.

=== Public opinion ===
In March 2024, a nationwide poll of over 10,000 people from across England, Scotland and Wales was commissioned by Dignity in Dying (a pro-assisted suicide group), found that 75 per cent of respondents supported legalising assisted suicide versus 14 per cent who opposed. Muslims were the only demographic in which the majority opposed. Another poll by Ipsos found that 66 per cent of people supported allowing a doctor to assist a terminally ill patient to end their life, with 16 per cent opposing. The polls were condemned by opponents of assisted suicide, who said they do not reflect people’s considered opinions when they are given more detailed information.

Doctors in the UK are evenly split on assisted dying, based on their experiences working within the health system. Similarly, according to the Royal College of Psychiatrists, psychiatrists are evenly split, with opposition to the proposed Westminster bill based on the belief that it would not provide sufficient safeguards.

== See also ==
- Bodily integrity
- Euthanasia in the United Kingdom
- Right to die
- Assisted Dying Bill 2023, in the Isle of Man
- Terminally Ill Adults (End of Life) Bill, in England and Wales
