= Care Not Killing =

British anti-euthanasia organisation

Care Not Killing logo

Care Not Killing is an alliance of multiple groups, including faith-based and pro-life organisations, opposed to legalising euthanasia or physician-assisted suicide in the United Kingdom. The alliance was founded in 2006.

Care Not Killing operates through a UK private limited company, CNK Alliance Limited.

The stated goals of Care Not Killing include promoting more and better palliative care, ensuring that existing laws against euthanasia and assisted suicide are not weakened or repealed during the lifetime of the current Parliament, influencing the balance of public opinion against any weakening of the law. They are opposed in their efforts by pro-assisted dying groups such as Dignity in Dying and Humanists UK.

== Background ==
Between 2003 and 2006 legislative attempts to legalise physician-assisted dying were made after the prominent human rights lawyer Lord Joffe proposed a Private Member's Bill entitled the "Assisted Dying for the Terminally Ill Bill" in the House of Lords. After the bill was first put forward and debated in February 2003, the bill was put forward again in November 2005 but in May 2006, an amendment delaying its introduction by six months was carried and progress of the bill was ultimately halted.

At the same time as the Private Member's Bill was being debated for the second time, January 2006 saw the launch of Dignity in Dying, itself a relaunch of the former The Voluntary Euthanasia Legalisation Society, calling for improvements in end-of-life care, including, but not limited to, the option of assisted dying.

Care Not Killing was founded in January 2006 largely in reaction events at the time with the BBC reporting that Care Not Killing needed to take action to counter the pro-euthanasia lobby, which it said was now making a determined attempt to change the law to allow doctors to "kill their patients".

== Our Duty of Care ==
Our Duty of Care (ODOC) is a sister group set up, administered and funded by Care Not Killing (CNK), representing a group of healthcare workers who oppose assisted suicide or euthanasia. The pressure group was formed in 2019 to oppose and subsequently make legal threats against the Royal College of Physicians (RCP) after the RCP conducted a poll asking its 36,000 members "what should the RCP's position be on whether or not there should be a change in the law to permit assisted dying?" that ultimately led to the RCP adopting a neutral stance on the issue after no majority opinion was recorded (43.4% of respondents thought the RCP should be opposed to a change in the law to permit assisted dying, 31.6% were in favour, and 25% took a neutral view).

As of 2024, ODOC campaigns are administered by Gillian Wright, a former palliative care doctor based in Scotland and David Randall, a consultant nephrologist working in London. In November 2024 The Observer reported that:

Our Duty of Care has close ties to religious lobby groups. It shares an office address and spokesperson with the Christian Medical Fellowship, an evangelical organisation with an anti-abortion stance, and receives funding from the religious lobby group Care (Christian Action, Research and Education), which is known for its opposition to abortion, sex education, gay marriage and broader LGBTQ+ rights.

== Funding ==
In 2021, The Times newspaper reported Care Not Killing received a donation of almost £90,000 from Brian Souter, the Scottish businessman and Stagecoach Group founder who has funded multiple socially conservative campaigns including those against abortion and the repeal of anti-gay legislation.

== See also ==
- Euthanasia in the United Kingdom
