= 2026 in Jersey =

Events in the year 2026 in Jersey.

== Incumbents ==
- Sovereign: Charles III
- Lieutenant governor: Jerry Kyd
- Chief minister: Lyndon Farnham
- Bailiff: Robert MacRae

== Events ==
- 26 February: Assisted Dying (Jersey) Law 202 was voted on, with 32 in favour of the bill, to 16 against.
- 7 June: 2026 Jersey general election: Islanders vote to elect 49 seats of the States Assembly.
