= Rosie Harper =

Anglican priest

The Reverend Canon Rosie Harper is a member of the General Synod of the Church of England and Chaplain to the Bishop of Buckingham.

A vicar at Church of St Peter and St Paul, Great Missenden from 2003 until 2021, Harper has been described by Telegraph journalist John Bingham as a "prominent liberal" within the Church. An ordained priest in the Church of England since 1999, Harper has supported the ordination of women in the Anglican Communion as priests and bishops. In 2014, she was described by BBC News as a "long-standing campaigner for the promotion of women in the Church".

She has expressed support for a change in the canon law of the Church of England and revising of the Marriage (Same Sex Couples) Act 2013 to allow same-sex marriage in the Church of England. She has also voiced support for assisted dying, a minority opinion within the Church clergy. She has also been critical of the Church turning away churchgoers (laypersons as well as clergy) wishing to pray or otherwise use church buildings during the COVID-19 pandemic in the United Kingdom, when such buildings were closed to prevent the spread of the virus. In 2023, she signed an interfaith statement condemning Islamophobia, antisemitism and Hinduphobia in the aftermath of the Gaza war.
