= Assisted suicide in the United Kingdom =

Assisted suicide is the ending of one's own life with the assistance of another. It is currently illegal under the laws of the United Kingdom. In England and Wales, the Suicide Act 1961 prohibits "aiding, abetting, counselling or procuring suicide" with a penalty of up to 14 years' imprisonment. Approximately 46 Britons a year travel abroad for physician-assisted suicide, usually to Dignitas in Switzerland. Following legal challenges, public prosecutorial guidance was issued in 2010 indicating scenarios where prosecution for assisted suicide may not be in the public interest. The phrase "assisted dying" is often used instead of physician-assisted suicide by proponents of legalisation and the media when used in the context of a medically assisted suicide for the purpose of relieving suffering. Bills to legalise assisted dying have been introduced multiple times in Parliament since the 1930s, but none has passed. The devolved governments of Scotland and Northern Ireland have not legalised assisted dying either, although there is some political support for changing the law in Scotland. Polling shows a majority of the British public and doctors support legalising assisted dying. The British Medical Association adopted a neutral position in 2021 after previously opposing any changes to the law.

== England and Wales ==
Section 2 of the Suicide Act 1961, as originally enacted, provided that it was an offence in "aiding, abetting, counselling or procuring suicide", and that a person who committed this offence was liable to imprisonment for a term not exceeding fourteen years. That section has been amended by the Coroners and Justice Act 2009.

Approximately 46 Britons a year go abroad for physician assisted suicide. Because of the inconsistencies between the law and prosecution Debbie Purdy launched a case to clarify whether or not her husband would risk being prosecuted if he helped her travel to a Dignitas clinic in Switzerland to die. Purdy's case ended on 30 August 2009 with the decision that the Director of Public Prosecutions had to clarify how the Suicide Act 1961 is to be enforced in England and Wales. In a 2010 guidance for prosecutors, the Crown Prosecution Service provided possible scenarios where a prosecution of an assisted suicide case would or would not be in the public interest, including scenarios where victims had "reached a voluntary, clear, settled and informed decision" or "was [not] physically able to undertake the act," among others. Other factors to consider include whether the assister "was... wholly motivated by compassion" and whether the assister had a history of abuse of the victim.

=== Attempts at reform ===
There have been various attempts to introduce legislation to change the legal situation regarding physician-assisted suicide in the United Kingdom.

In 1931 Dr C. Killick Millard, the President of the Society of Medical Officers of Health, proposed a Voluntary Euthanasia (Legislation) Bill for incurable invalids. In 1935, Lord Moynihan and Dr Killick Millard founded the British Voluntary Euthanasia Society (later known as EXIT and now as Dignity in Dying). The first attempt to reform the law in England was in 1936 by Lord Ponsonby of Shulbrede and supported by the Euthanasia Society.

The British Voluntary Euthanasia Society produced A Guide To Self Deliverance giving guidelines on how a person should commit suicide. The UK Attorney General moved to prevent publication, on the grounds that the book violated the Suicide Act 1961 that makes assisted suicide illegal. Therefore, it was unclear whether the Society could be held accountable for assisting in suicide because of its publication.

In 1969, a Bill was introduced into the House of Lords by Lord Raglan. In 1970, the House of Commons debated the issue. Baroness Wootton introduced a Bill to the Lords in 1976 on the matter of "passive euthanasia".

On 10 December 1997, a vote was taken in the House of Commons on the issue of introducing a Doctor Assisted Dying Bill, proposed by Labour MP Joe Ashton. The bill was defeated by 234 votes to 89.

Between 2003 and 2006, Labour peer Lord Joffe made four attempts to introduce bills that would have legalized physician-assisted suicide and voluntary euthanasia - all were rejected by Parliament.

In June 2012, the British Medical Journal published an editorial arguing that medical organisations like the British Medical Association ought to drop their opposition to assisted dying and take a neutral stance so as to enable Parliament to debate the issue and not have what Raymond Tallis described as a "disproportionate influence on the decision".

In 2014, Labour peer Lord Falconer introduced an Assisted Dying Bill into the House of Lords. The bill proposed that terminally ill patients with a life expectancy of less than six months be given the option of a medically assisted death, subject to legal safeguards. The bill reached committee stage before running out of time in the session.

In 2015, Labour MP Rob Marris introduced an Assisted Dying Bill based on Lord Falconer's proposals the year before. The bill was defeated by 118 votes to 330 on 11 September 2015.

In 2016, Conservative peer Lord Hayward reintroduced the Assisted Dying Bill into the Lords. The bill did not get past the first reading due to the parliamentary session ending.

The question for politicians in Britain today is why do you force your citizens, people in the most terrible circumstances who are determined to end their suffering in a way of their own choosing, to leave their country and travel to Switzerland to exercise their free will?

On 28 January 2020, Lord Falconer again introduced an Assisted Dying Bill into the House of Lords. The bill was similar to the 2014 iteration. The bill did not reach a second reading in the House of Lords.

On 28 September 2020, the British Medical Association restated its position on assisted dying, asserting that the BMA believes no form of assisted suicide should be made legal within the UK. One year later in September 2021, the BMA formally adopted “a neutral position” on physician assisted dying.

On 26 May 2021, Baroness Meacher introduced an Assisted Dying Bill into the House of Lords. The bill was similar to previously read iterations, and did not go beyond a first reading in the House of Lords. Humanists UK welcomed the bill but also criticised it for not addressing the needs of the intolerably suffering who are not terminally ill.

In September 2024, Kim Leadbeater, MP for Spen Valley, was drawn first in the ballot for private members' bills. She announced on 3 October 2024 that she would introduce a bill on assisted dying, and on 16 October 2024, the bill was introduced to the House of Commons as the "Terminally Ill Adults (End of Life) Bill". The full text of the bill (as presented for second reading) was published on 11 November 2024.

On 23 October 2024, the Senedd voted against a declaration calling for Westminster to legalise assisted suicide, although the proposed motion put to the Senedd was different to that of bill on assisted dying being debated in Westminster and broader in its reach. The motion was rejected with 19 in favour, 26 against and 9 abstaining. It was noted the Senedd that the Welsh parliament does not have the power to legalise euthanasia or assisted suicide, and the vote was symbolic.

On 29 November 2024, the Terminally Ill Adults (End of Life) Bill passed its Commons second reading in Westminster by 330 votes to 275, the furthest stage reached by any similar bill to that date. The committee stage for the bill begins on 28 January 2025, marking the first of several evidence and discussion sessions. Over the coming weeks, the committee will meet several days each week, inviting experts to provide evidence before proposing changes to the bill, as seen in the current discussions. This stage allows input from specialists in healthcare, palliative care, and disability, as well as professionals with experience in assisted dying abroad. The bill’s sponsors aim to complete the committee stage by 25 April 2025, when the bill will return to the House of Commons for debate and a vote on the committee’s proposed changes.

On 20 June 2025, the Terminally Ill Adults (End of Life) Bill passed its third reading in the House of Commons by 314 votes to 291. However, the bill ran out of time in the House of Lords so was not passed on its first passage.

The Terminally Ill Adults (End of Life) Bill was brought forwards again but was rejected in the Commons on its second reading of the passage with a vote of 286 to 270 on 11 Sep 2026.

== Scotland ==
Assisted dying in Scots law might constitute murder, culpable homicide or no offence depending on the nature of the assistance. In 1980, the Scottish branch of the British Voluntary Euthanasia Society (now called Exit) broke off from its original society in order to publish How to Die with Dignity, which became the first publication of its kind in the world.

In a 2012 consultation on the Member's Bill proposed by MSP Margo MacDonald, 64% of the members of the public who choose to give comment on the issue rejected the proposals. A similar consultation by the Health and Sport Committee in 2014 came to a different conclusion, with 78% of responses by individuals being supportive of the proposals. Nevertheless, in 2015 a majority of MSPs including the first minister Alex Salmond voted against the bill in the Scottish Parliament, defeating it in its first stage.

In February 2019 a group of MSPs, including previous opponent Kezia Dugdale, formed to attempt to reform assisted dying law in the Scottish Parliament.

In March 2024, the Assisted Dying for Terminally Ill Adults (Scotland) Bill was introduced to the Scottish Parliament by MSP Liam McArthur. If passed at stage three, it would have allowed adults with a terminal illness to end their lives with medical assistance. On 13 May 2025, the first stage of the bill was approved by MSPs by a margin of 70 votes in favour to 56 against. McArthur’s bill was the first bill on the subject of assisted dying to advance further than the first stage.

On 17 March 2026, the bill was rejected at stage three by a margin of 57 votes in favour to 69 against.

== Northern Ireland ==
Since health is a devolved matter in the United Kingdom, it would be for the Northern Ireland Assembly to legislate for assisted dying as and when it sees fit. To date, no such bills have been tabled there.

== Legal challenges ==
There have been multiple challenges to the blanket ban on assisted suicide by people wanting a physician-assisted suicide, both by patients with and without a terminal illness.

In 2001, motor neurone disease sufferer Diane Pretty took her case to the House of Lords, for the right to allow her husband to assist legally in her suicide. The case was dismissed by them, and also subsequently by the European Court of Human Rights in 2002.

In 2008, multiple sclerosis sufferer Debbie Purdy took her case to the House of Lords for clarification on whether her husband would face prosecution on returning from Switzerland, should he help her to travel there for an assisted death. She won, and the Director of Public Prosecutions clarified the likelihood of prosecution in this instance in 2009.

In 2012 a man with locked-in syndrome, Tony Nicklinson, applied to the High Court for the right for a medically assisted death. His case was rejected and he decided to end his life via starvation shortly afterwards. His wife ultimately took his case to the Supreme Court, in R (Nicklinson) v Ministry of Justice, where it was rejected in 2014. The judges did rule however that they have the authority to declare the parliamentary blanket ban on assisted suicide to be incompatible with human rights law.

In 2014, the Director of Public Prosecutions further clarified the likelihood of prosecution against medical professionals. Previously, they were more likely to face assisted suicide prosecution due to their role as care givers. The DPP clarified that only those medical professionals directly involved in providing care to the concerned patient would be more likely to face prosecution. It was said that the clarification was made at the request of the Supreme Court. In 2015, the clarification was subsequently challenged in the High Court by Nikki and Merv Kenward, supported by the Christian Legal Centre, where it was argued that the DPP was making laws as opposed to applying them. The High Court rejected the challenge against the DPP's clarifications, and the Court of Appeal subsequently denied a request to challenge the High Court's decision.

In 2017, retired lecturer Noel Conway brought his case to the High Court for the right for a medically assisted death. He has motor neurone disease and is terminally ill. His case was dismissed by the High Court, by the Court of Appeal in 2018, and ultimately by the Supreme Court at the end of 2018. Conway died on 9 June 2021 at the age of 71, after he and his family decided to remove his ventilator that kept him alive.

Also in 2017, a man known as "Omid T" with multiple system atrophy brought a case to the High Court for the right to a medically assisted death. His case is different from Noel Conway's in that he is not terminally ill. In October 2018 Omid ended his life in Switzerland.

In May 2019, a man who became paralysed in a car accident and now lives with excruciating pain, Paul Lamb, began legal proceedings to seek a peaceful death. His case is supported by Humanists UK.

== Opinion polls ==
A 2015 Populus poll commissioned by the group Dignity in Dying found broad public support for the introduction of assisted dying laws in the United Kingdom. 82% of people supported it, including 86% of people with disabilities.

Another poll showed that 54% of British General Practitioners are either supportive or neutral towards the introduction of assisted dying laws. A similar 2017 poll on Doctors.net.uk published in the BMJ said that 55% of doctors would support it. The BMA, which represents doctors in the UK, adopted a neutral position on assisted dying in September 2021. This followed a vote in which 49% of doctors supported the change.

== Assisted dying advocates ==
Paul Blomfield, Rosie Harper, Margo MacDonald, Tony Nicklinson, Terry Pratchett, and Patrick Stewart support the concept.

=== Noel Conway ===
Noel Conway was a lecturer from Shrewsbury, England. In 2014, he was diagnosed with motor neurone disease and wanted the right to an assisted death.

All forms of assisted suicide are currently illegal in the United Kingdom, and doctors found to be assisting a suicide can be jailed for up to 14 years, under the Suicide Act 1961. Conway challenged this law in the High Court in 2017 on the grounds of human rights, claiming that the law against physician-assisted suicide in the United Kingdom interferes with his "right to respect for private and family life", protected under Article 8 of the European Convention on Human Rights. His case was supported by Dignity in Dying. On 5 October 2017 the High Court ruled against him.

Conway subsequently took his case to the Court of Appeal, which was heard in May 2018. Three judges rejected his case on 27 June 2018. The court stated that Parliament is better placed to rule on the issue and concerns were raised over whether the safeguards proposed by Conway were adequate to protect vulnerable people.

Following the decision in the Court of Appeal, Conway announced his intention to take his case to the Supreme Court. This was the first time since 2014 the Supreme Court has considered a case of assisted dying, when they reviewed the case of Tony Nicklinson posthumously. Although Nicklinson's case was ultimately rejected, some statements by the Justices were seen as positive by assisted dying campaigners. However, on 27 November 2018 the Supreme Court rejected the possibility of a full hearing for Conway's case.

Conway died on 9 June 2021 at the age of 71, after he and his family decided to remove his ventilator that kept him alive.

=== Organisations ===
The following organisations, which are part of the Assisted Dying Coalition, advocate legalising assisted dying or voluntary euthanasia: My Death, My Decision, Humanists UK, Humanist Society Scotland, Friends at the End.

== Assisted dying opponents ==
Liz Carr, Diane Abbott, Gordon Brown, and Edward Leigh oppose the concept as does the Catholic Church in Scotland and the Catholic Church in England and Wales.

== See also ==
- Euthanasia in the United Kingdom
- All-Party Parliamentary Group for Choice at the End of Life
- Suicide legislation
- Assisted Dying Bill 2023, Isle of Man
- Assisted Dying (Jersey) Law 202-
