= Liam McArthur =

Scottish politician (born 1967)

Liam McArthur MSP
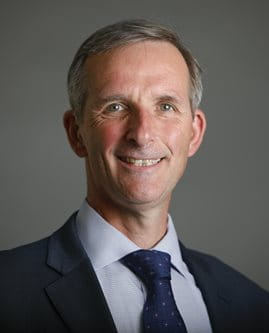
- Official portrait, 2026

Deputy Presiding Officer of the Scottish Parliament
- In office 14 May 2021 – 14 May 2026 Serving with Annabelle Ewing
- Presiding Officer: Alison Johnstone
- Preceded by: Christine Grahame; Lewis Macdonald
- Succeeded by: Katy Clark

Member of the Scottish Parliament for Orkney Islands
- Incumbent
- Assumed office 3 May 2007
- Preceded by: Jim Wallace
- Majority: 5,560 (54.1%)

Personal details
- Born: Liam Scott McArthur; 8 August 1967 (age 59) Edinburgh, Scotland
- Party: Scottish Liberal Democrats
- Spouse: Tamsin McArthur
- Children: 2
- Education: University of Edinburgh
- Website: www.liammcarthur.org.uk

Liam Scott McArthur (born 8 August 1967) is a Scottish politician who served as Deputy Presiding Officer of the Scottish Parliament, alongside Annabelle Ewing, from 2021 to 2026. A member of the Scottish Liberal Democrats, he has been the Member of the Scottish Parliament (MSP) for Orkney since 2007.

== Early life and education ==
McArthur was born on 8 August 1967 in Edinburgh. In 1977, at the age of ten, he moved to Sanday, Orkney with his family.

McArthur attended Sanday Junior High School, then Kirkwall Grammar School, where he boarded at the Papdale Halls of Residence throughout the week. Whilst at Kirkwall, McArthur developed an interest in sport including football, which became a lifelong passion. McArthur went on to represent Orkney in the junior inter country matches against Caithness and Shetland.

McArthur then spent a year in Mexico as an American field service student, before attending the University of Edinburgh to study politics. At university McArthur captained the football first team and represented Scottish Universities in the UK finals.

== Political career ==
McArthur had previously worked as an aide to Jim Wallace in the House of Commons and as Special Adviser to the Deputy First Minister in 2002. When Wallace stepped down at the 2007 Parliament election, McArthur was chosen to replace him as the Lib Dem candidate and was elected. McArthur was subsequently re-elected in 2011 and again in 2016 with a substantially increased majority.

After being re-elected in the 2021 election with a reduce majority, McArthur was elected as one of the two Deputy Presiding Officers of the Scottish Parliament. McArthur was re-elected again in the 2026 Scottish Parliament election with an increased majority.

=== Assisted dying ===
In 2024 McArthur introduced a bill on assisted dying in the Scottish Parliament, the Assisted Dying for Terminally Ill Adults (Scotland) Bill. He had consulted on this subject in 2021. The first such bill had been attempted in 2010.

== Personal life ==
McArthur met his wife Tamsin when working in Brussels. She was working for law firm Clifford Chance.

His brother Dugald was left quadriplegic after a rugby accident in 1996.

Scottish Parliament
Preceded by Jim Wallace	Member of the Scottish Parliament for Orkney; 2007–present	Incumbent
