= My Death, My Decision =

British assisted dying organisation

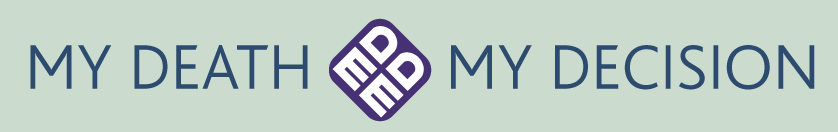
- Formation: 2009; 17 years ago
- Type: Pro–assisted suicide campaign group
- Location: United Kingdom
- Chair: Trevor Moore
- Founder: Michael Irwin
- Website: Official website
- Formerly called: Society for Old Age Rational Suicide (2009–2015)

My Death, My Decision (MDMD) is an organisation that campaigns for the legalisation of assisted suicide in England and Wales. The group was founded in 2009, in order to campaign for a change in the law and advocate on behalf of adults of sound mind, who are either terminally ill or incurably suffering.

In 2019, alongside other leading right-to-die societies, My Death, My Decision co-founded the Assisted Dying Coalition. It is also a longstanding member of the World Federation of Right to Die Societies.

== History ==
Established in 2009, My Death, My Decision was founded by the ex-Chair and former board members of Dignity in Dying, in response to the organisation's decision to limit its campaign and solely focus on assisted dying for the terminally ill.

Prior to 2009, there had been two main assisted dying organisations in the United Kingdom; Dignity in Dying (previously known as the Voluntary Euthanasia Society) representing England and Wales, and Friends at the End based in Edinburgh.

In 1935 the Voluntary Euthanasia Society was formed by a group of preeminent doctors, theologians, and lawyers - including Dr Charles Killick Millard, and Lord Moynihan. The stated aim of the society was to campaign for a change in the law and build support for the view that adults suffering from an illness ‘for which no cure is known, should be entitled by law to the mercy of a painless death if and when that is his express wish’. Shortly afterwards, in 1936 Lord Ponsonby introduced legislation, for the first time, which would have legalised assisted dying for adults who were either terminally ill or incurably suffering but the law did not pass.

Throughout the 1940s, 1950s, and 1960s the society remained active and continued in its efforts to secure reform. In 1961 the crime of suicide was formally abolished, and a series of legislative reforms including the suspension of the death penalty in 1969 and David Steel's Abortion Law Reform in 1967 suggested a growing movement in support of individual freedom. This movement culminated for the Voluntary Euthanasia Society in 1969, when Lord Raglan unsuccessfully attempted to introduce legislation, for the second time, which would have legalised assisted dying. During the 1970s the organisations briefly changed its name to ‘EXIT’ before reverting to the ‘Voluntary Euthanasia Society’, and in 1981 it reaffirmed its commitment to promote legislation to allow adults suffering from a severe illness to which no relief was known, to receive an immediate painless death, if that was the patient's expressed wish. Over the years, the society increased its efforts to secure reform of the law and commissioned opinion polls, lobbied politicians, campaigned for reform, and prepared draft legislation for the legalisation of assisted dying.

By the 1990s and early 2000s, the society had elected Dr. Michael Irwin, a former medical director for the United Nations as vice-chair and then chair until 2003. During his tenure, Dr Irwin helped to draft Lord Joffe's 2003 Patient (Assisted Dying) private members bill, which sought to legalise assistance to die for adults suffering unbearably from either a terminal or serious and progressive illness; as well as defending Dr Dave Moor, who in 1990 was the first British doctor to be accused and acquitted of murder for complying with a patient's wish to be injected with a lethal dosage of the pain-killer diamorphine. Then in 2005, when the Voluntary Euthanasia Society changed its name to ‘Dignity in Dying’, it also refined its goals so as to campaign solely for a change in the law to allows those who were terminally ill the option of an assisted dying - and this later came to be interpreted as campaigning for those with a prognosis of 6 or fewer months left to live.

In response, Dr Irwin, Angela Farmer, Nan Maitland, and Liz Nichols (all former board members of Dignity in Dying) founded the ‘Society for Old Age Rational Suicide’ to stand up and advocate on behalf of adults suffering from non-life-threatening but incurable and intolerable illnesses, who would otherwise fail be represented by a right-to-die organisation. In 2015, the organisation changed its name to ‘My Death, My Decision’ and restated its aim to secure a change in the law which would enable adults of sound mind, who were either terminally ill or incurably suffering, to decide the manner and moment of their own death.

MDMD is a member of the World Federation of Right to Die Societies.

== Objectives ==
The organisation's Articles of Association set out its objectives as:

- To campaign for a change in the law in the UK to allow medical assistance to die to be given to mentally competent adults, with incurable health problems that result in their perceived quality of life falling permanently below the level they are able to accept, providing this is their own persistent wish.

The organisation also advocates the use of Advance Decisions (otherwise known as “living wills”), and to create a forum for people who support the moral case of extending assistance to die to those who are incurably suffering.

== Activities ==
=== Campaign for assisted suicide ===
My Death, My Decision has long supported the rights of those who want assistance to end their own life, and lobbied Parliament for a change in the law which would enable both those who are terminally ill or incurably suffering the option of a safeguarded assisted dying. The organisation believes that there is a strong moral case to extend assisted dying to adults facing years of permanent and unbearable suffering, and cites changes in the law in Belgium, Canada, Germany, Italy, Luxembourg, the Netherlands, and Switzerland as evidence in support of its position.

In March 2019, the organisation commissioned a poll from the National Centre for Social Research (NatCen) which found that up to 88% of the public favoured assisted suicide for either those who were incurably suffering or terminally ill, in at least some circumstances. The research indicated a significant shift in public attitudes in favour of assisted dying for the incurably suffering, and prompted a Member of Parliament, who had previously voted against assisted dying reform, to suggest MPs were at risk of becoming out of touch.

In 2019, the group also helped to form the Assisted Dying Coalition, a group of like-minded campaign groups seeking to legalise assisted dying for the terminally ill or incurably suffering.

Persistent campaigns include calling for the Government to set up an inquiry into the impact of the Suicide Act 1961 and to investigate jurisdictions which have legalised assisted dying abroad; challenging the use of the “forfeiture rule” (a civil law which can prevent those who compassionately assist someone to die abroad from receiving any inheritance, despite not having criminal charges brought against them); as well advocating the use “Statements of Settled Wishes”, a new safeguard for assisted dying which would allow someone to pre-register their intention to have an assisted death.

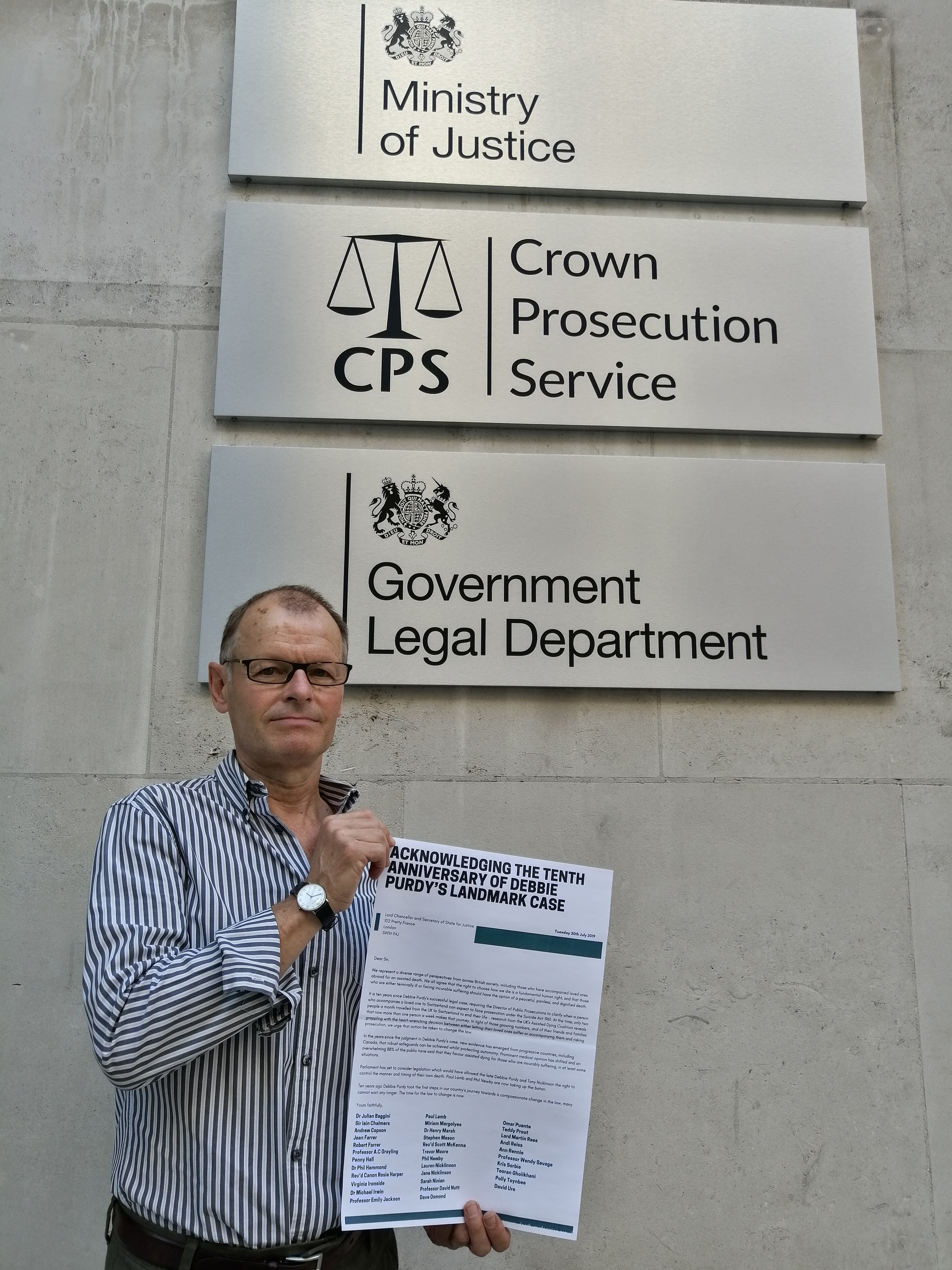
Trevor Moore holding an open letter to mark the tenth anniversary of Debbie Purdy's landmark legal case in 2019

In July 2019, they organised an open letter to mark the tenth anniversary of Debbie Purdy's landmark legal case, which was signed by thirty-four leading doctors, politicians, religious leaders, academics, and campaigners, to urge the Secretary of State for Justice to consider reviewing the law on assisted dying. Although the Secretary of State for Justice had approved a call for evidence into assisted suicide, the inquiry was subsequently reversed following David Gauke's resignation.

=== Legal cases ===
The non-profit organisation has consistently supported right-to-die test cases to challenge the ban on assisted dying throughout its history. In 2018, it was the first assisted dying organisation to support Omid T, a man suffering from multiple systems atrophy, to bring a legal appeal which sought for the courts to examine an extensive international body of evidence in support of assisted suicide. In 2019, after Omid T had ended his life abroad days before judgment in his case was due, they were also among the first organisations to champion Phil Newby's successor case and helped it to raise more than £48,000 to challenge the legality of the ban on assisted dying. In 2019, the organisation also supported their longstanding patron Paul Lamb, who was paralysed from the neck down, to bring a fresh right-to-die case; after the Supreme Court had ruled in a 2014 case he had brought, that it would rule again a potential declaration of incompatibility between restrictions on the right to die and the Human Rights Act should Parliament fail to legislate decisively.

=== Advisory Medical Group ===
In 2019, in a letter to the British Medical Journal entitled ‘Why we’re campaigning for broader criteria for assisted dying in the UK‘, the best-selling author Dr Henry Marsh, women's right advocate Professor Wendy Savage, and acclaimed medical researcher Sir Iain Chalmers challenged campaigns for assisted suicide which were restricted to only those with six or fewer months left to live, and called upon Parliament to respect the choices of those facing incurable and intolerable suffering such as Paul Lamb or Tony Nicklinson. Shortly afterwards, the signatories helped to form My Death, My Decision's advisory medical group who provide advice on clinical issues, develop and publicise resources, and aim to provide a voice for medics who support patient choice.

Many of the group's aims are based on respecting patient autonomy and ending restrictions which prevent doctors and patients from openly discussing all end-of-life options. In 2019, the group secured a commitment from the General Medical Council that doctors who are informed by their patient of an intention to travel abroad for an assisted death, should not feel compelled to breach confidence and inform the police.

In 2020, amid the coronavirus pandemic in Britain, the group published guidance in the British Medical Journal which urged doctors to respect their patient's end-of-life wishes.

=== Annual lecturers ===
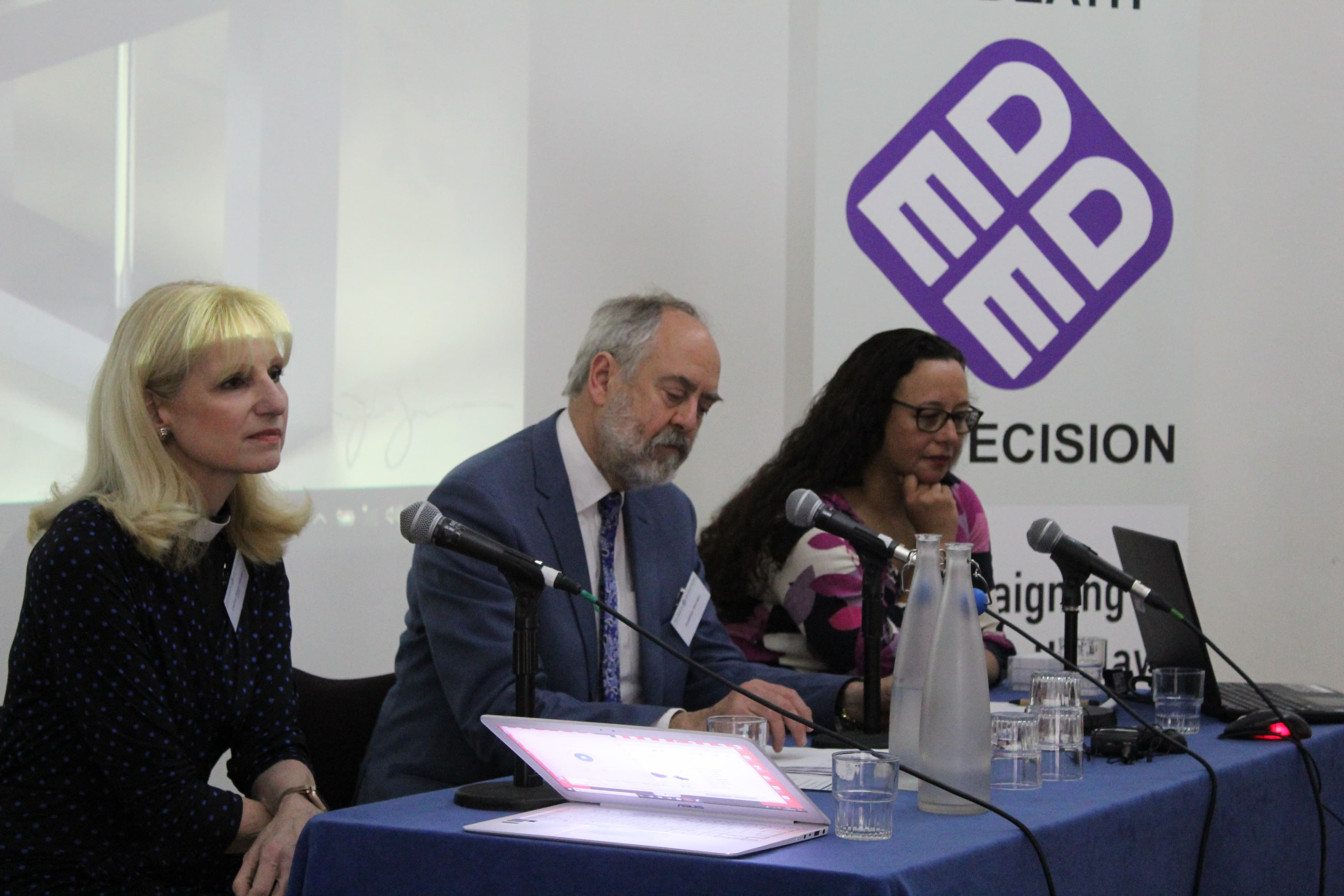
A MDMD lecture on assisted dying

Since 2010, the organisation has hosted an annual lecture from international experts, campaigners, authors, academics, and philosophers on assisted dying reform. Previous speakers have included Baroness Mary Warnock, Silvan Luley (the Director of Dignitas), Virginia Ironside, Professor Jan Bernheim, Dr Rob Jonquiere, Professor Ceila Kitzinger, Dr Els van Wijngaarden, Professor A.C. Grayling, and Times Journalist Melanie Reid.

In 2019, the organisation announced that it would host a new annual lecture ‘The Doran Lecture’, in memory of Frank Doran a former Member of Parliament and committed assisted dying advocate. In 2020, the first talk was delivered by Dr Stefanie Green, Canada's preeminent expert on assisted suicide and President of CAMAP (the Canadian Association of MAiD Assessors and Providers).

=== Organisation ===
The campaign group is supported by a diverse range of doctors, politicians, religious leaders, philosophers, and academics including: Sir Iain Chalmers, Professor A.C. Grayling, Dr Phil Hammond, Virginia Ironside, Dr Henry Marsh, Miriam Margolyes, Professor David Nutt, Lord Martin Rees, Baroness Kathleen Richardson, Professor Wendy Savage, and journalist Polly Toynbee.

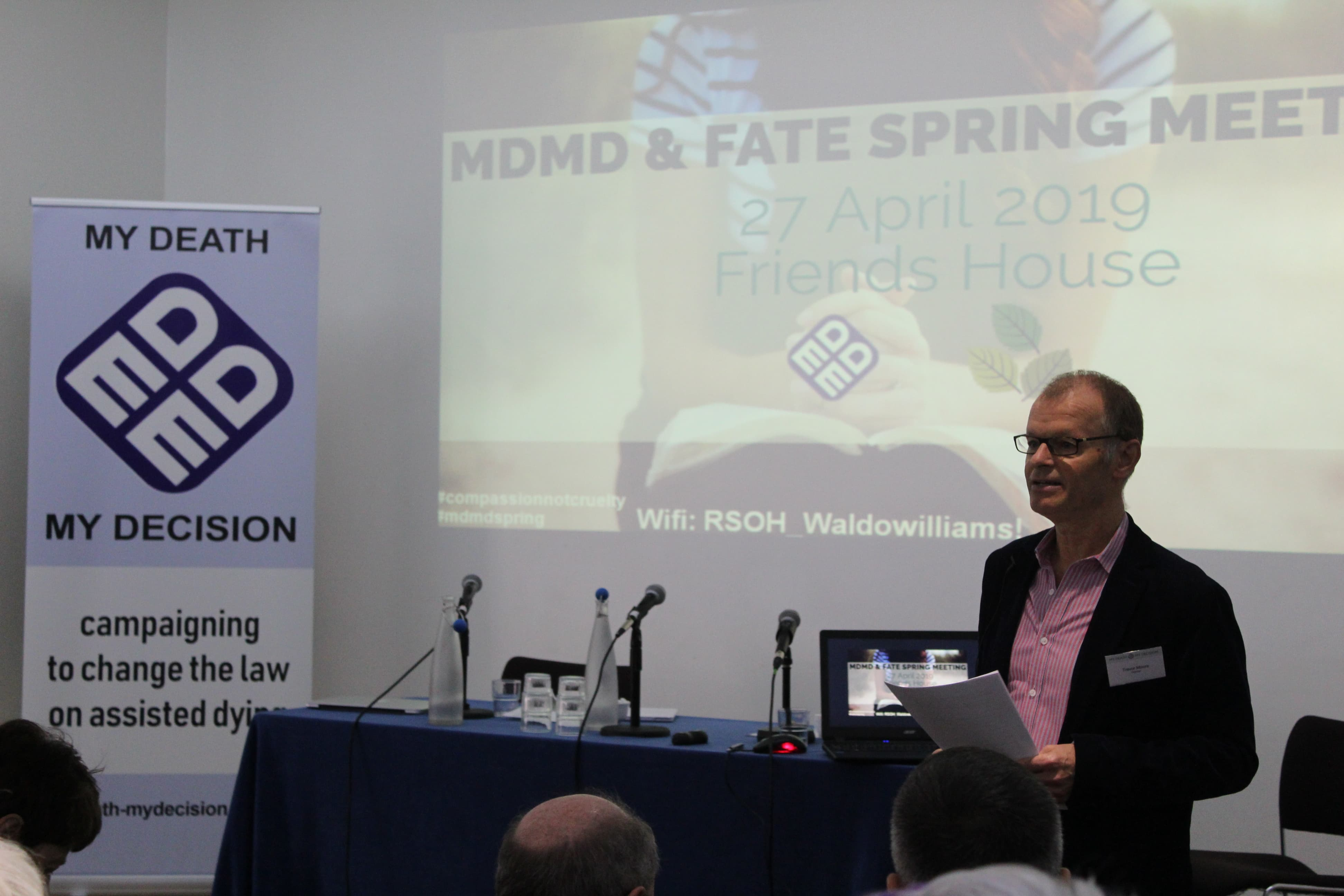
Chair Trevor Moore opening lecture on Faith and Assisted Dying

== See also ==
- Assisted suicide in the United Kingdom
- Euthanasia in the United Kingdom
