= Terminally Ill Adults (End of Life) Bill =

Proposed legislation in England & Wales

- Bill
- Parliament of the United Kingdom
- Long title: A Bill to allow adults who are terminally ill, subject to safeguards and protections, to request and be provided with assistance to end their own life; and for connected purposes.
- Citation: Bill 012 2024–25
- Introduced by: Kim Leadbeater MP (Commons); Lord Falconer of Thoroton (Lords)
- Territorial extent: England and Wales

Status: Not passed

History of passage through Parliament

Terminally Ill Adults (End of Life) Bill was a private members' bill (PMB) which proposed to legalise assisted suicide for terminally ill adults in England and Wales. The bill was introduced by Labour backbench MP Kim Leadbeater in October 2024 after she was chosen first by ballot for PMBs. The political parties in Parliament gave MPs a conscience vote on the bill. The bill passed the Commons in June 2025 but stalled in the House of Lords. It was reintroduced in May 2026, and in a reversal, was voted down by the Commons on its second reading in September 2026.

== Campaign ==
Assisted suicide is the ending of one's own life with the assistance of another. Assisting a suicide is illegal in England and Wales under the Suicide Act 1961 and can lead to a maximum of 14 years' imprisonment. This is distinct from euthanasia where a doctor directly ends another person's life to relieve suffering. In 2015, a private member's bill (PMB) called Assisted Dying (No 2) Bill was introduced by Labour's Rob Marris, which was a free vote for MPs. However, it was defeated at its second reading by 330–118. In May 2021, another PMB was introduced on assisted dying by Molly Meacher, Baroness Meacher, and received its second reading in the House of Lords but did not progress.

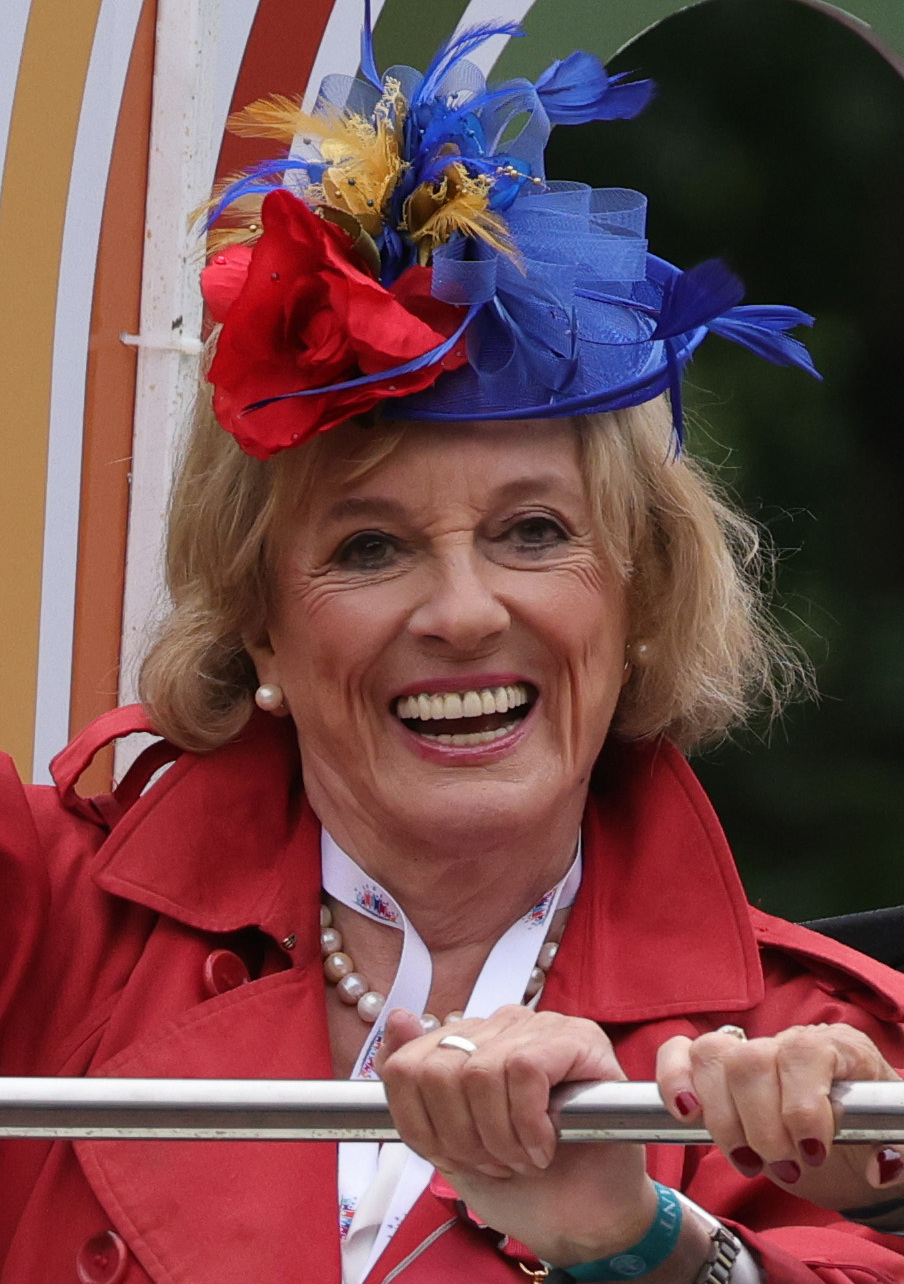
Dame Esther Rantzen was a high-profile campaigner in support of the bill until her death in 2026.

On 19 December 2023, journalist and television presenter Dame Esther Rantzen, who had terminal lung cancer, said she joined the assisted suicide clinic Dignitas in Switzerland where it is legal and permits foreigners to use the service. This led to the leaders of the main political parties represented in Parliament to say they would facilitate parliamentary time for a bill.

On 29 February 2024, the Health and Social Care Select Committee published a report on assisted dying with chair Steve Brine (Conservative) saying that: "The inquiry on assisted dying and assisted suicide raised the most complex issues that we as a committee have faced, with strong feelings and opinions in the evidence we heard."

On 13 March, Starmer pledged to give MPs a vote on assisted suicide if Labour won the 2024 general election. In October 2024, Starmer said that he was "pleased" that there would be a vote on assisted suicide, as it allowed him to keep his promise to his friend Esther Rantzen.

On 29 April 2024, MPs debated assisted suicide after a petition on UK Parliament petitions website reached the 100,000 signature threshold. By the time of the debate it had reached over 200,000 signatures. Before the debate, the then Conservative government responded to the petition stating: "It remains the government's view that any change to the law in this sensitive area is a matter for Parliament to decide and an issue of conscience for individual parliamentarians rather than one for government policy. If the will of Parliament is that the law on assisting suicide should change, the government would not stand in its way, but would seek to ensure that the law could be enforced in the way that Parliament intended". Campaigner Esther Rantzen pleaded to MPs to attend the debate.

On 16 June, then prime minister Rishi Sunak said that in principle that he was not opposed to legalising assisted suicide and stated that "It's just a question of having the safeguards in place and that's where people have had questions in the past". He added that the issue was a matter of conscience.

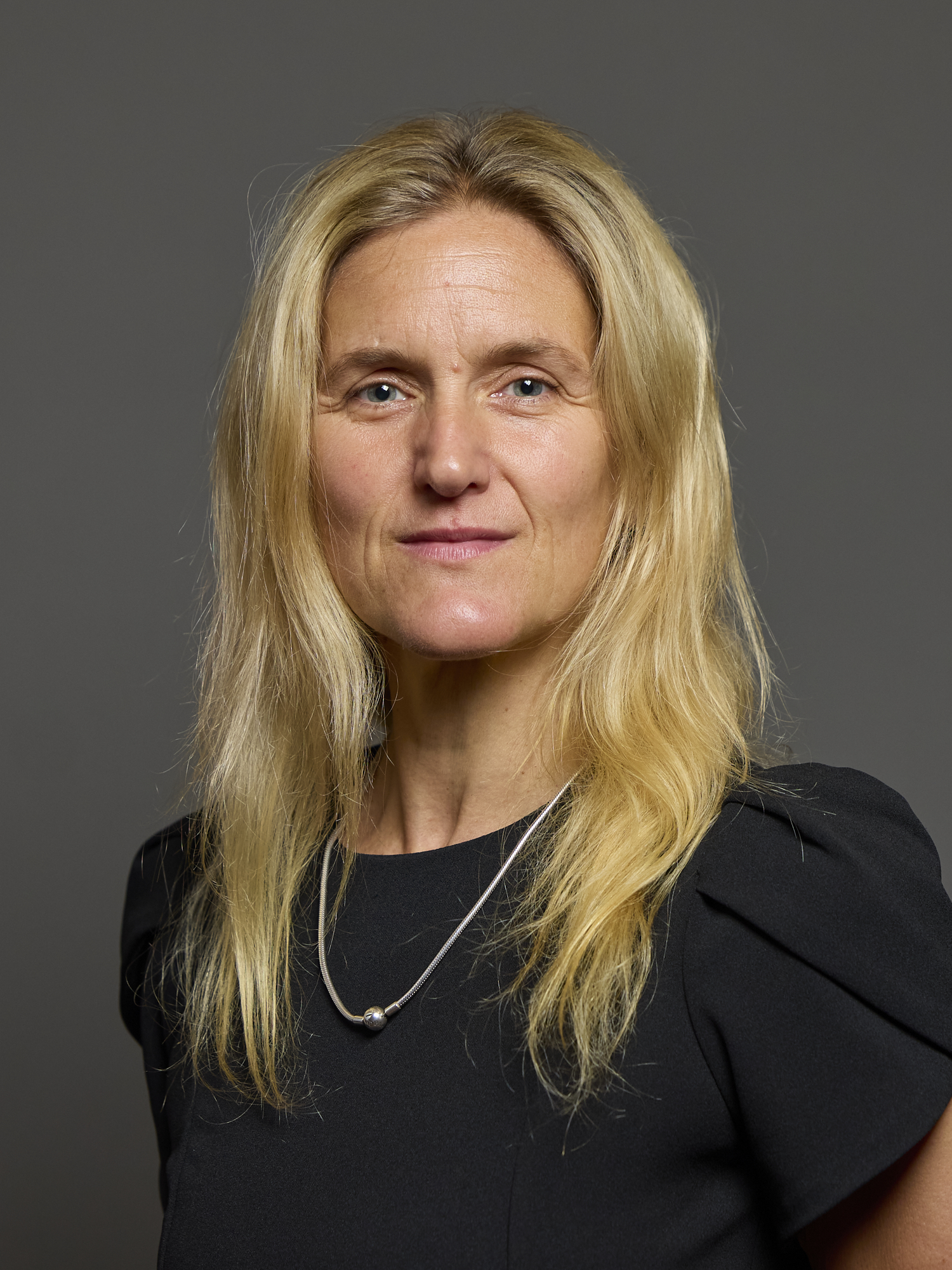
Backbench Labour MP Kim Leadbeater introduced the bill.

The UK July 2024 general election resulted with a Labour victory with Starmer becoming prime minister. In September 2024, Kim Leadbeater, Labour MP for Spen Valley, was drawn first in the ballot for private members' bills. She announced on 3 October 2024 that she would introduce a bill on assisted dying, and on 16 October 2024, the bill was introduced to the House of Commons. The full text of the bill (as presented for second reading) was published on 11 November 2024.

== Summary of the bill ==
The bill (prior to committee) proposed to legalise assisted suicide for terminally ill adults aged 18 or older given that they met these requirements:

- Must be a resident of England and Wales and be registered with a GP for at least a year
- Mental capacity to make an informed decision free from coercion
- Expected to die within six months
- Make two independent declarations about their desire to die, which must be witnessed and signed
- Two doctors must be satisfied the person is eligible; with a gap of a week between their assessments

== First parliamentary passage ==
=== House of Commons ===
==== First reading ====
The Bill received its First Reading on 16 October 2024.

==== Second reading ====
The second reading with a debate and votes from MPs occurred on 29 November. It was passed with 330 in favour to 275 against. Forty-six MPs did not vote; the Scottish National Party abstained as the bill does not apply to Scotland. Emma Hardy voted both Yes and No as an "active abstention".

The remaining stages of Parliament's consideration of the bill may proceed, including possible amendments to the bill.

==== Committee stage ====
The committee was selected by Leadbeater made up of 23 MPs, 14 of whom support the bill and 9 of whom oppose the bill. On 10 February 2025 Leadbeater suggested removing the need for administration of assisted suicide to be overseen by the judiciary, which had originally been one of the key components of the safeguards for her bill.

==== Report stage ====
The House met on 16 May 2025 to discuss amendments to the bill raised during committee stage. One amendment was voted on, which was proposed by opponents, and would have allowed employers to prevent their employees from participating under the new law. It was defeated by 243 votes to 279.

The House met for a second time on 13 June 2025, whereby an amendment to the bill which prevents medical professionals raising the procedure with people under 18 years old was passed by 259 votes to 216.

Members selected by Leadbeater to sit on the committee considering her bill
Name	Party	Supports bill?
Kim Leadbeater	Labour	Yes
Stephen Kinnock	Labour	Yes
Sarah Sackman	Labour	Yes
Bambos Charalambous	Labour	Yes
Marie Tidball	Labour	Yes
Simon Opher	Labour	Yes
Jake Richards	Labour	Yes
Rachel Hopkins	Labour	Yes
Lewis Atkinson	Labour	Yes
Naz Shah	Labour	No
Juliet Campbell	Labour	No
Daniel Francis	Labour	No
Sojan Joseph	Labour	No
Jack Abbot	Labour	No
Sean Woodcock	Labour	No
Kit Malthouse	Conservative	Yes
Neil Shastri-Hurst	Conservative	Yes
Danny Kruger	Conservative	No
Rebecca Paul	Conservative	No
Tom Gordon	Liberal Democrat	Yes
Sarah Green	Liberal Democrat	Yes
Sarah Olney	Liberal Democrat	No
Liz Saville-Roberts	Plaid Cymru	Yes

==== Third reading ====
On 20 June 2025, the House of Commons held a further debate on amendments followed by a vote on the bill as a whole. The bill was passed by 314 votes to 291, marking the last stage at which the Commons was able to reject the bill. The majority of Labour Party and Liberal Democrat MPs voted for the bill, while the majority of Conservative Party MPs voted against the bill. All of the Scottish National Party (SNP)'s MPs didn't vote.

In terms of UK party leaders, those that voted "Aye" (yes) to the bill in its third and final reading included:

- Labour Party leader and Prime Minister, Keir Starmer
- The Liberal Democrats deputy leader, Daisy Cooper
- Green Party co-leaders, Carla Denyer and Adrian Ramsay
- Plaid Cymru's leader in Westminster, Liz Saville Roberts (Plaid's party leader, Rhun ap Iorwerth, is a member of the Welsh Senedd, not the House of Commons)

Party leaders that voted "No" to the bill in the third and final reading included:

- Conservative Party leader, Kemi Badenoch
- Labour Party deputy leader, Angela Rayner
- Reform UK leader, Nigel Farage
- Democratic Unionist Party (DUP) leader, Gavin Robinson
- Traditional Unionist Voice (TUV) leader, Jim Allister

The leader of the Liberal Democrats, Ed Davey, does not have a vote recorded for the bill in its third reading and neither does the Scottish National Party's (SNP's) leader in Westminster, Stephen Flynn.

Terminally Ill Adults (End of Life) Bill — Third Reading
Party	Votes for	Votes against	Did Not Vote
Labour	224 (+2 tellers)	160 (+1 teller)	15
Conservative	20	92 (+1 teller)	5
Liberal Democrats	56	15	2
SNP	-	-	9
Sinn Féin	-	-	7
DUP	-	5	-
Reform	2	3	-
Green	4	-	-
Plaid Cymru	3	1	-
Alliance	-	1	-
SDLP	1	-	1
UUP	-	1	-
TUV	-	1	-
Independent	3	12	-
Total	314 (+2 tellers)	291 (+2 tellers)	39

=== House of Lords ===
==== First reading ====
Following a successful vote in the House of Commons, the Bill as passed by the Commons was read in the House of Lords for the first time, on 23 June 2025.

==== Second reading ====
The Bill passed its second reading on 12 September and entered the committee stage on 14 November.

==== Committee stage ====
The bill began its committee stage on 14 November 2025, but failed to complete it before the 2024–26 Session ended in April 2026, resulting in the loss of this version of the bill. Some people, including some opponents of the bill, had suggested peers in the Lords were deliberately blocking passage of the bill via filibustering and that the unelected chamber was risking damage to its democratic legitimacy as a result. Others had said lengthy consideration in the Lords committee stage was necessary.

== Second parliamentary passage ==
=== House of Commons ===
In May 2026, Lauren Edwards, Labour MP for Rochester and Strood, was drawn second in the ballot for private members' bills in the 2026–27 Session. She subsequently announced that she would reintroduce the version of the Terminally Ill Adults (End of Life) Bill passed by the House of Commons. Edwards stated she brought back the original bill. This would have ensured that it would be eligible to bypass requiring passage in the House of Lords under the Parliament Acts 1911 and 1949.

==== First reading ====
The Bill received its First Reading on 17 June 2026. Edwards published the full text of the Bill on 16 July 2026, which was identical to the Bill passed by the House of Commons in June 2025, except for including two amendments that the House of Lords had made in the previous Session.

==== Second reading ====
The Second Reading debate took place on 11 September 2026. The bill was rejected in the Commons with a vote of 286–270 against, a majority of 16. 87 MPs did not vote. 55% of Labour MPs who participated voted for the bill, compared to 45% against. A majority of Conservative Party MPs, 77.6% of all Conservative MPs, opposed the legislation, while the majority of Liberal Democrats supported it, 73.2% of all Liberal Democrat MPs. All of the Scottish National Party (SNP)'s MPs didn't vote.

In terms of UK party leaders, those that voted "Aye" (yes) to the bill in its second reading included:

- The Liberal Democrats Deputy Leader, Daisy Cooper.
- Green Party Leader in Westminster, Ellie Chowns (Green's Party Leader, Zack Polanski, is not a member of the House of Commons)
- Plaid Cymru's Leader in Westminster, Liz Saville Roberts (Plaid's Party Leader, Rhun ap Iorwerth, is a member of the Welsh Senedd, not the House of Commons)

Party leaders that voted "No" to the bill in the second reading included:

- Conservative Party Leader and Opposition Leader, Kemi Badenoch
- The Liberal Democrats Leader, Ed Davey.
- Democratic Unionist Party (DUP) leader, Gavin Robinson.
- Traditional Unionist Voice (TUV) leader, Jim Allister.
- Ulster Unionist Party (UUP) Former Leader (2017 to 2019), Robin Swann.
- Restore Britain Leader, Rupert Lowe.

Those who did not vote on the proposed legislation included from the Labour Party: Prime Minister Andy Burnham, First Secretary of State Louise Haigh, and Chancellor of the Exchequer John Healey. From Reform UK: Party Leader Nigel Farage and Deputy Leader Richard Tice. Social Democratic and Labour Party (SDLP) Leader Colum Eastwood also didn't vote. Damien Egan, Labour MP for Bristol North, cast a proxy vote on behalf of the Labour MP for North East Somerset and Hanham Dan Norris, who had been banned from the Parliamentary Estate, due to being arrested on suspicion of rape, child sex offences, child abduction and misconduct in a public office in April 2025. Both Egan and Norris voted in support of the Bill.

The table below shows how many MPs voted for or against the bill, as well as those who did not vote by party. Below that is what percentage each vote is of the party's MPs who voted on the bill and what percentage this is of all the party's MPs in total (i.e. including those who did not vote).

The Terminally Ill Adults (End of Life) Bill – Second reading
Party	Votes for (%)	Votes against (%)	Did not vote (%)
Labour	190 (55.4% of those who voted, 47.6% of all)	153 (44.6% of those who voted, 38.3% of all)	56 (14%)
Conservative	17 (15.9% of those who voted, 14.7% of all)	90 (84.1% of those who voted, 77.6% of all)	9 (7.8%)
Liberal Democrats	52 (75.4% of those who voted, 73.2% of all)	17 (24.6% of those who voted, 23.9% of all)	2 (2.8%)
SNP	–	–	8 (100%)
Reform	–	5 (100% of those who voted, 62.5% of all)	3 (37.5%)
Sinn Féin	–	–	7 (100%)
DUP	–	5 (100%)	–
Green	5 (100%)	–	–
Plaid Cymru	3 (75%)	1 (25%)	–
SDLP	–	–	2 (100%)
Your Party	–	2 (100%)	–
Restore	–	1 (100%)	–
Alliance	–	1 (100%)	–
UUP	–	1 (100%)	–
TUV	–	1 (100%)	–
Independent	2 (18.2%)	9 (81.8%)	–
Total	270	286	87

Alternative layout regarding party breakdown on how each party's MPs voted:

- Labour Party: 190 for, 153 against, 56 did not vote
- Conservative Party: 17 for, 90 against, 9 did not vote
- Liberal Democrats: 52 for, 17 against, 2 did not vote
- Scottish National Party (SNP): 8 did not vote
- Reform UK: 5 against, 3 did not vote
- Sinn Féin: 7 did not vote
- Democratic Unionist Party (DUP): 5 against
- Green Party of England and Wales: 5 for
- Plaid Cymru: 3 for, 1 against
- Social Democratic and Labour Party (SDLP): 2 did not vote
- Your Party: 2 against
- Restore Britain: 1 against
- Alliance Party of Northern Ireland (APNI): 1 against
- Ulster Unionist Party (UUP): 1 against
- Traditional Unionist Voice (TUV): 1 against
- Independent MPs: 2 for, 9 against

== Debate ==
The Starmer ministry took a neutral stance on the bill, so Labour MPs had a free vote. The secretary of state for energy and climate change, Ed Miliband, said he supported the bill. The secretary of state for justice, Shabana Mahmood, and the secretary of state for health and social care, Wes Streeting, said they oppose the bill with the latter arguing people would feel an obligation to die. Starmer did not publicly announce his voting intention prior to the second reading, and voted in favour of the bill as did 15 members of his cabinet, while eight voted against.

Leader of the Conservative Party, Kemi Badenoch, Leader of the Liberal Democrats, Ed Davey, and Reform UK leader, Nigel Farage voted against the bill. Davey said it would be a free vote for his party's MPs, but argued that the terminally ill can have a good standard of living and that elderly people may feel pressure from family members to commit assisted suicide. He said that there should be more investment in palliative care. 80% of Conservative MPs voted against the bill but a majority of Liberal Democrat MPs supported the bill, as did three of Reform's four other MPs. In the bill's third and final reading most Reform UK MPs voted against the bill, with three voting against it (including party leader, Nigel Farage), while two for.

The mother of the house, Diane Abbott of Labour, and the father of the house, Edward Leigh of the Conservatives, wrote a joint op-ed in The Guardian opposing the bill. They pointed out that the Assisted Dying (No 2) Bill 2015 was published seven weeks before MPs voted on it, whereas this bill was published eighteen days ahead of its second reading; combined with a plethora of newly-elected MPs, they argued that the process was flawed and did not give the bill proper scrutiny. They said that unlike wealthy individuals who have stable finances and good palliative care in cases of terminal illness, poor people who may struggle to pay for social care may feel obliged to die to maintain finances for their family, or feel unintended pressure to proceed with assisted dying as they are taking up a valuable bed in the hospital. They concluded that health and social care needs improvement, in particular palliative care.

=== Public opinion ===
Polling by Populus (which later became Yonder) in 2019 indicated that a change in the law to allow the option for terminally ill people in the UK to choose assisted dying was supported by 84% of the British public, with majority backing across all ages, areas of the country, socioeconomic status and political views. This was an increase from 82% in their 2015 survey. The 2019 poll "interviewed 5,695 adults (aged 18+) in Great Britain online between 22 and 24 March 2019. Quotas and weights were used to ensure the sample was representative of the GB adult population." The pollster is a member of the British Polling Council and abides by its rules.

In March 2024, a nationwide poll of over 10,000 people from across England, Scotland and Wales was commissioned by Dignity in Dying (a pro-assisted suicide group), found that 75 per cent of respondents supported legalising assisted suicide versus 14 per cent who opposed. Muslims were the only demographic in which the majority opposed. Another poll by Ipsos found that 66 per cent of people supported allowing a doctor to assist a terminally ill patient to end their life, with 16 per cent opposing. The polls were condemned by opponents of assisted suicide, who said they do not reflect people’s considered opinions when they are given more detailed information.

A survey of 1,088 doctors in the UK showed 48% of respondents were against legalising assisted dying, while nearly 45% supported the prospect, with a majority saying a physician-assisted dying (PAD) law would negatively impact the medical profession. According to a 2024 Royal College of Psychiatrists survey of its members, psychiatrists were evenly split on support of assisted dying, with a majority of psychiatrists responding they were not confident that consent could act as an adequate safeguard and would not be willing to participate in an assisted dying service.

The Guardian reported that in April–June 2024 the Nuffield Council on Bioethics ran a citizens' jury on assisted dying, in which randomly selected jurors from England heard from experts and discussed changing the law. At the end, 20 out of 28 jurors supported legalising assisted dying, while seven opposed it and one was undecided.

Among former prime ministers, Gordon Brown, Theresa May, Boris Johnson, and Liz Truss all argued against the bill. Brown said: "An assisted dying law, however well intended, would alter society’s attitude towards elderly, seriously ill and disabled people, even if only subliminally". David Cameron, who opposed the 2015 bill, supported the bill and stated that it was "not about ending life, it is about shortening death" and that the bill has "sufficient safeguards" protecting vulnerable people, and Rishi Sunak voted in favour of the bill, writing that he believes it to be "a compassionate change to the law".

== See also ==
- Bodily integrity
- Dignity in Dying
- Euthanasia in the United Kingdom
- My Death, My Decision
- Right to die
- Right to Life UK
