= Killick Millard =

British doctor and activist (1870–1952)

Dr C. Killick Millard
- Millard in 1936
- Born: Charles Killick Millard; 14 August 1870
- Died: 7 March 1952 (aged 81); Leicester, England
- Education: University of Edinburgh, MD, D.Sc.

Charles Killick Millard (1870–1952) was a British doctor, eugenicist, and public health official who founded the Voluntary Euthanasia Legalisation Society.

Millard received his MD degree in 1896 from the University of Edinburgh and served as Medical Officer of Health for Leicester from 1901 to 1935. Millard was a member of the British Eugenics Society and vice president of the Malthusian League.

In 1935, Millard founded the Voluntary Euthanasia Legalisation Society (now Dignity in Dying), a pro-euthanasia lobbying organisation in the United Kingdom. In addition to supporting euthanasia, Millard advocated for temperance, eugenics, cremation, and birth control, and helped found the first birth control clinic in Leicester, arguing that "the submerged tenth" uptake of birth control "would be a 'valuable eugenic instrument' which would improve the quality of the race".

== Education and Early Career ==
Charles Killick Millard was born on 14 August 1870 to Reverend C. S. Millard, the Anglican Rector of Costock in Nottinghamshire. He was educated at Trent College before studying medicine at the University of Edinburgh, receiving an MD in 1896 and later a D.Sc. in Public Health. Millard served as a medical superintendent and public health official in Birmingham and Burton-on-Trent, before becoming the Medical Officer of Health for Leicester in 1901.

While a proponent of vaccination, several residents in Leicester were strongly opposed to compulsory smallpox vaccination, with "an Anti-Vaccination League" popular. Millard argued against compulsory vaccination of infants and the use of mass vaccination to control outbreaks.

Scholarship compiled by Welshman states the "new science of eugenics and its emphasis on good breeding and restraints on the propagation of the unfit" was increasingly influential amongst "medical professionals in Leicester" during this time, with papers given to the Leicester Medical Society including the 1905 paper "entitled 'Are consumptives and their children unfit?', and in the presidential address in 1908 on 'Evolution and heredity'".

Historians state Millard was "informed by a coherent philosophy of health that... was underpinned by eugenic ideas about the importance of maintaining the calibre of the racial stock", influenced by his links to his "important local mentor" Charles John Bond, a proponent of eugenics and euthanasia and fellow member of the British Eugenics Society. However, questions remain regarding "the extent of this influence (on Millard and his public health work), how far it shaped policy recommendations and whether professional experts were in advance of local political opinion in pressing for changes that reflected particular ideological concerns".

Millard later advocated isolation of cases and voluntary vaccination of medical and nursing staff and of contacts of Smallpox cases. The tactic, when successful, was often adopted when compulsory vaccination was abolished. Millard "had gained notoriety for his stand against compulsory infant vaccination," while arguing data "showed that Leicester’s smallpox mortality rate was dropping faster than other municipalities with wider vaccination programmes".

== Public Health Campaigns and Eugenics ==
Other aspects of Millard's work included public health campaigns on poverty, stating it was the "most patent influence for evil on the public health", and arguing "all serious efforts to permanently lower the death-rate must aim also at reducing poverty". In 1911, Millard argued greater fertility of "slum dwellers" was cancelled out by high infant mortality, arguing "this consideration goes a long way towards allaying the fear that the falling birth-rate of the superior classes, and the comparatively high birth-rate of the very lowest class, threatens the quality of the race".

During World War I Millard continued to advocate for contraceptive use, describing birth rates for "those who constitute such a large proportion of the 'submerged tenth', the denizens of the slums, are without doubt at the present day the most prolific section of the community, whereas we should like to see them the least prolific". Millard's conclusion, that "birth control would be a 'valuable eugenic instrument' which would improve the quality of the race" was later praised in the Eugenics Review. Later reviews argue Millard's attitudes toward poverty and public health "was increasingly replaced with a flirtation with fashionable eugenic ideas" over the course of the war, with Millard writing high birth rates "amongst the lowest stratum of the population... inevitably tend towards depreciation in the quality of the race" in a memorandum to Randall Davidson, the Archbishop of Canterbury.

In 1917, Millard was listed as a vice president of the Malthusian League, a Malthusian and eugenicist organisation.

An early proponent of garden cities, by 1916 Millard stated in his annual report that "tenants could be classified as good, bad and indifferent", arguing many "were to blame for their poor living conditions, and 'dirty' families could 'contaminate' their neighbours and lower the social tone of the area that they had chosen to live in". Millard was an opponent of "van dwellers", stating they "were of an inferior type judging by their appearance, the dirty conditions of the interior of their vans, and the dilapidated condition of the exterior" in a 1926 report. He also campaigned for increased housing, stating "let our slogan be, 'Save the children from the slums!' to which we may add, 'Keep the old houses for the old people'", arguing for improvement to slum areas over clearance.

Millard resigned from Eugenics Society in 1928, while "continued to maintain a eugenic position on a number of issues thereafter".

In 1931, Millard became the president of the Society of Medical Officers of Health. He later argued the "feeble-minded and mentally deficient" should be sterilised in 'Feeblemindedness and the social problem group'. Millard also founded the first birth control clinic in Leicester in 1931, though considering birth control by wealthier classes as dysgenic, "but hoped that 'the lower strata' would adopt it so that eventually birth control and sterilization might 'become a most valuable instrument of negative eugenics'". Welshman states, "Millard's advocacy of birth control was clearly motivated by eugenics and, with the establishment of the clinic in March 1931, had a practical influence on public health policy".

In private correspondents during 1932, Millard discussed euthanasia for “imbeciles” and “idiots”, stating “It might, however, be extended to include these sufferers. But in such a matter it would be wise, I think, to go step by step”.

While "eugenic stock-phrases such as 'submerged tenth', 'stock', 'C3 classes' and 'low standard of life' peppered his writing," Millard's rhetoric and actions in practical health policy often diverged. Millard was succeeded as the Medical Officer of Health for Leicester in 1935 by Dr Kenneth Macdonald, who appeared to "have little interest in eugenics" and coincided "with a sea-change in social thought in which new ideals of human dignity and citizenship undermined previously entrenched eugenic interpretations of the problems of the slums".

== Voluntary Euthanasia Legalisation Society ==
Millard later founded the Voluntary Euthanasia Legalisation Society (VELS), a lobbying organisation to legalise euthanasia in the UK. Their first committee meeting minutes were on 30 January 1935, with Charles John Bond appointed chairman and Millard as honorary secretary. The inaugural public meeting was held on 10 December 1935.

In 1936, Millard and the VELS drafted the Voluntary Euthanasia (Legalisation) Bill 1936, the first piece of legislation introduced in the UK to legalise voluntary euthanasia. Speaking in Leicester, Millard argued, "the objection based on the sacredness of life must be dismissed," with the proposed legislation, “a last service to society by relieving it of a useless burden". Millard described seeking voluntary euthanasia as "an act of true altruism", which would benefit family members through the “cessation of burden” by "defectives". Later historians criticised burden-arguments, arguing how "the bill made no reference to a sense of being a burden as grounds for euthanasia, it re-opened the question of the slippery slope". Some Lords opposed Millard's wider argument, with the Earl of Crawford stating the legislation causes "(one to) contemplate with horror the strife and the dissension which this Bill is going to bring into every family", being "riven in twain" at the "the unconscious pressure which will be placed upon the sick man to persuade him that he is in the way and that he should evacuate this life".

The bill was defeated in the House of Lords by 35 votes to 14 in December 1936.

In a 1942 report for the society, Millard wrote on the "existence of support" for the "non-voluntary 'euthanasia' of the 'mentally handicapped', who were assumed to be 'poor human derelicts' for whom life held no possibility of happiness". Historians argue Millard's private material shows "open-mindedness" to mercy killing and non-voluntary euthanasia on the disabled.

Millard continued association with the Euthanasia Society of America, receiving a letter from their secretary R.L. Mitchell describing the Nazi use of "forced euthanisation towards mentally handicapped Polish children" as "a great blessing". Later academic research "has suggested that neither... were entirely opposed to the Nazis 'euthanasia' campaign".

A second attempt to introduce voluntary euthanasia legislation by VELS in 1950 failed, due to "revulsion at the Nazi euthanasia programme", being withdrawn without a vote. Historians later argued "The association of VELS with the Nazi regime was simplistic, but not entirely unfair".

== Personal and Later Life ==
Millard had one son, Maurice Langley Millard, MB ChB (1900–1987), educated at Bradfield College and the University of Birmingham, who was a long-serving general medical practitioner in Leicester. In his youth, Maurice was a noted rugby player for the Leicester Tigers and Leicestershire Rugby Union teams. In 1931, Maurice married Barbara Morrison (1903–1987), and had no children.

Millard was a Unitarian, though he lobbied the Anglican Lambeth Conference in 1920 in favour of his health campaigns.

In 1950, Millard lobbied for the release of Sigbert Ramsauer, a Nazi SS physician and convicted war criminal who operated at the Dachau, Mauthausen, Gusen, and Loibl concentration camps. Ramsauer was "accused of extreme inhumanity, including neglecting prisoners until death and carrying out sadistic medical experiments", with Ramsauer later suggesting concentration camp prisoners "will have done something they shouldn’t have, after all we didn’t lock up the whole world". While convicted of "two counts of involuntary euthanasia performed on Allied POWs at the Loibl Pass" concentration camp, Ramsauer wrote to Millard "banking on sympathy Millard was likely to show towards a fellow believer in euthanasia". Millard unsuccessfully argued for Ramsauer's release "on the grounds that the medical killings he had carried out were euthanasia".

Millard died on 7 March 1952 at his home in Leicester, England, at the age of 81.
