= Assisted Dying (Jersey) Law 202- =

The Draft Assisted Dying (Jersey) Law 202- is a bill to legalise assisted dying for terminally ill adults who live in Jersey.

The bill states that adults (i.e. those aged 18 and over) with terminal illnesses causing suffering which is unbearable and in which the person is expected to die within six months, or 12 months for those with neurodegenerative conditions such as Parkinson's and motor neurone disease (MND), may legally choose assisted dying.

On 26 February 2026, members of the States Assembly voted by 32 in favour of the bill, to 16 against. The bill still required royal assent. Royal assent was later granted on 9 July 2026, meaning the island's government can bring the law into force. The bill will undergo a minimum 18 month implementation period from when it was adopted on 26 February 2026, meaning the earliest anticipated date the law would come into effect would be September 2027.

== See also ==
- Assisted Dying Bill 2023, a similarly draft law (or bill) from the Isle of Man
- Assisted Dying for Terminally Ill Adults (Scotland) Bill
- Assisted suicide in the United Kingdom
