= Assisted Dying Bill 2023 =

Legislation in the Isle of Man

The Assisted Dying Bill 2023 is a Private Member's Bill proposed by Alex Allinson, a Member of the House of Keys, that would legalise assisted dying in the Isle of Man.

The bill was first proposed by Allinson, the MHK for Ransey, in 2023, and approved by the Isle of Man's Legislative Council, at which point it was sent to King Charles III for royal assent. The bill passed its vote at the third reading in the Isle of Man's lower house on 23 July 2024 with 16 votes for, to 8 against. It passed the vote at its third reading in the upper house on 25 March 2025 with 7 votes for, to 1 against. The bill allows a person over the age of 18, who has been a resident of the Isle of Man for five years or longer, to have the option of choosing to die if they have been diagnosed with a terminal illness and have less than 12 months to live. The legislation's approval makes the Isle of Man the first part of the British Isles to approve assisted dying.

Once the bill has received royal assent, secondary legislation will be required, along with the establishment of codes of practice. Allinson has said he hopes that an assisted dying service for the Isle of Man would be in place by 2027.

Following the bill's parliamentary approval, Churches Alive in Mann, a group representing church leaders, said the political debate on the issue had "done nothing to lessen concerns" and there was "very little effective provision to guard against coercion". In response, Allinson said he remained committed to ensuring Tynwald "reinforce the safeguards and governance within the bill" through secondary legislation.

A similar bill in Jersey passed on 26 February 2026.

In April 2026, UK Lord Chancellor David Lammy wrote to the Isle of Man Government advising that the Ministry of Justice was unable to recommend the bill for royal assent in its current form. The letter stated that, while the Manx government had provided assurances on key safeguards (including against coercion and compliance with the European Convention on Human Rights), these were not explicitly included in the bill itself.

On 20 October 2026, the bill was granted Royal Assent. The Manx government stated that a date has not been agreed for the law to be implemented.

== See also ==
- Assisted suicide in the United Kingdom
- Euthanasia in the United Kingdom
