= Dignity in Dying =

UK pro-assisted dying organisation

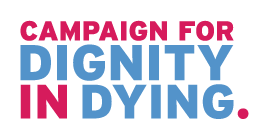
- Founded: December 1935
- Founder: Killick Millard
- Type: Pro-assisted suicide and voluntary euthanasia organisation
- Headquarters: London, England
- Subsidiaries: Compassion in Dying, Healthcare Professionals for Assisted Dying
- Website: dignityindying.org.uk
- Formerly called: Voluntary Euthanasia Legalisation Society, Euthanasia Society, Exit

Dignity in Dying (originally The Voluntary Euthanasia Legalisation Society) is a pro-assisted suicide and voluntary euthanasia lobbying and campaign organisation in the United Kingdom.

In 2011, Dignity in Dying stated that it had the support of approximately 25,000 "members of the public". The organisation declares it is independent of any political, religious or other affiliations, and has the stated primary aim of campaigning for individuals to have greater choice and more control over end-of-life decisions, so as to alleviate any suffering they may be undergoing as they near the end of their life.

Dignity in Dying campaigns for the greater choice, control and access to a full range of medical and palliative services at the end-of-life, including providing terminally ill adults with the option of a painless, assisted death, within strict legal safeguards.

Alongside its campaigning work, Dignity in Dying, through its sister organisation Compassion in Dying, is also an information source on end-of-life issues and a provider of advance decisions.

== History ==
=== Origins ===
In 1931 Dr Charles Killick Millard, the Medical Officer of Health for Leicester from 1901 to 1935, gave the Presidential address at the Annual General Meeting of the Society of Medical Officers of Health. In the address, he advocated the "Legalisation of Voluntary Euthanasia", which prompted considerable debate in Britain involving doctors, clerics and the wider public. Millard's proposal was that in the case of terminal illnesses the law should be changed "to substitute for the slow and painful death a quick and painless one".

The organisation was set up in December 1935 under the name of The Voluntary Euthanasia Legalisation Society (VELS). The initial meeting that set the society up was held at the headquarters of the British Medical Association free of charge, despite the BMA not supporting the aims of the society. During the debate, the meeting was disrupted by 40 members of a Catholic youth association.

The foundation of the society followed an offer of £10,000 from Mr. O. W. Greene, a terminally-ill man in London. The initial offer was retracted and no posthumous endowment was left to the Society after Greene learned that the prospective Society would only be supporting legalisation of euthanasia for those with incurable conditions. The first chairman was C. J. Bond, a consulting surgeon at the Leicester Royal Infirmary; Millard was made the first honorary secretary. Other members of the executive committee were drawn from Bond and Millard's social milieu in Leicester, including Astley V. Clarke from the Leicester Royal Infirmary; Rev Dr R. F. Rattray, a Unitarian minister and principal of University College, Leicester; Canon F. R. C. Payne of Leicester Cathedral; Rev A. S. Hurn; Frederick Attenborough, also a former principal of University College, Leicester; and H. T. Cooper, the Honorary Solicitor of the Committee.

The society did not attempt to build a popular movement at first but attempted to build, according to Kemp, "a network of distinguished sympathisers able to influence policy at high levels". The society had a Consultative Medical Council and a Literary Group, and were endorsed by a variety of authors, progressive reformers, feminists and supporters of the Fabian Society. Early supporters included Henry Havelock Ellis, Vera Brittain, Cicely Hamilton, Laurence Housman, H. G. Wells, Harold Laski, George Bernard Shaw, Eleanor Rathbone MP, G. M. Trevelyan, W. Arbuthnot Lane, and a variety of peers including Lord Woolton of Liverpool (Conservative) and Lord Moynihan who had been the president of the Royal College of Surgeons.

The first attempt to pass legislation to make euthanasia legal in Britain was the Voluntary Euthanasia (Legalisation) Bill 1936 introduced to the House of Lords by Arthur Ponsonby. The debate was not split along party political grounds and the Government considered it "outside the proper range of Government intervention and to be one which should be left to the conscience of the individual members of the House". The Hunterian Society held a debate on 16 November 1936 to debate whether "the practice of voluntary euthanasia would be unjustifiable", and the Bill was opposed by the British Medical Association.

=== 1950s to 1980s ===
On 28 November 1950, the next attempt was made by Lord Chorley of Kendal, a vice-president of the society, who brought a pro-voluntary euthanasia motion before the House of Lords. The motion was so widely condemned it was withdrawn without a division. According to N. D. A. Kemp, the attempt was an "ignominious failure", as were similar attempts to produce more liberal legislation generally on abortion, homosexuality and divorce.

Following the death of the honorary secretary Killick Millard and the resignation of Lord Denman, the president of the society, and the deaths of two prominent supporters of the society, E.W. Barnes and Dr N.I. Spriggs, a new honorary secretary was found in R. S. W. Pollard who moved the society to be based in London from Leicester. The society also changed tactics: moving away from courting the medical and legal elites to trying to build up a mass movement to exert "grass-roots pressure" and efforts were made to bring up the topic in civic society groups like Rotary Clubs, local newspaper editorials etc.

From 1955 onwards, the 'Legalization' was dropped from the name along with the 'Voluntary' to make it the Euthanasia Society (although some sources place it at 1960). The Euthanasia Society placed adverts on the London Underground and on mainline railway services in the south of England, with the wording "The Euthanasia Society Believes that incurable sufferers should have the right to choose a Merciful Death". In 1960, the chairman, C. K. MacDonald died and was replaced by Leonard Colebrook. He was replaced temporarily by Maurice Millard. In 1962, he was replaced by the Unitarian minister Rev A. B. Downing, and in 1964, C. R. Sweetingham was made secretary. Prominent people who supported the society during the 1960s included the legal academic and president of the Law Reform Association Glanville Williams. Williams gave a paper entitled 'Voluntary euthanasia – the next step' at the Annual General Meeting of the society in 1955. Williams' ethical justification of euthanasia argued against the principle of double effect and for a utilitarian approach to the questions in medical ethics including both voluntary euthanasia and abortion. His proposal would have allowed a physician to put as a defence to a homicide, assault or bodily harm charge that the person was incurably and fatally ill if the doctor was acting in good faith. These proposals mirror those of James Rachels discussed below.

According to Kemp, the public association of euthanasia with eugenics and Nazi atrocities marred attempts in the 1950s to promote voluntary euthanasia, but such setbacks were short-lived. The next legislative attempt was started in 1967 with a bill drafted by Mary Rose Barrington, a member of the executive committee of the Euthanasia Society and barrister. Attempts were made to find an MP willing to introduce it to the Commons but eventually it was introduced to the Lords in 1969 by Lord Raglan, a member of the National Secular Society.

The word 'Voluntary' was reinstated to the name in 1969 to become the Voluntary Euthanasia Society. It was also known as Exit (not to be confused with Exit International) from 1979 but this was reverted in 1982. During the period it was known as 'Exit', the secretary of the society, Nicholas Reed, was convicted of conspiracy to variously aid and abet or counsel a number of suicides. He was jailed for two and a half years, although this was reduced to 18 months on appeal. Reed had supported Mark Lyons, a seventy-year-old man who provided pills and alcohol to several sick people. Lyons was given a two-year suspended sentence. The society had voted in 1979 to publish a "Guide to Self-Deliverance", a booklet which described suicide methods. This was challenged by the Attorney General in 1982 under s2 of the Suicide Act 1961, and after a brief attempt to fight back against this, the distribution of the booklet was suspended in 1983.

After the name was changed back following the conviction of Reed and Lyons, Lord Jenkins of Putney introduced an amendment to the Suicide Act to introduce a defence for those who acted "on behalf of the person who committed suicide and in so acting behaved reasonably and with compassion and in good faith" but this was defeated 48 votes to 15.

In 1988, the Voluntary Euthanasia Society, as it was then, attempted to place a full-page newspaper advertisement in the Evening Standard showing twenty-four young men with advanced emphysema with the words "A day in the life of an emphysema sufferer" and accompanied by "We believe that he should have the right to choose a peaceful and dignified death." The British Medical Association contacted the Advertising Standards Authority to block publication of the ad, and a representative of the British Lung Foundation condemned the advert, saying that "fears of patients with lung disease should not be exploited in this way."

=== 1990s ===
In 1990, the organisation campaigned for the early release of Anthony Cocker, who was convicted of murder after killing his wife Esther after she begged him to end her suffering from multiple sclerosis.

In 1992, the society supported Dr Nigel Cox, who was prosecuted and convicted for murder for shortening the life of a patient at the Royal Hampshire County Hospital.

=== Post 2000 ===
Dignity in Dying was the new name endorsed by members at the annual general meeting in 2005. Its current chair of the governing board is Sir Graeme Catto and its chief executive is Sarah Wootton. The name change was done to "get away from the suggestion that you can only achieve dignity in dying with euthanasia".

Dignity in Dying has a range of patrons, including people who have been associated with high-profile cases connected with Dignity in Dying's campaigns, such as Lesley Close (sister of John Close), Brian Pretty (husband of Diane Pretty) and Heather Pratten. Other patrons include prominent individuals from the worlds of business, politics, the arts and religion, such as Terry Pratchett, Jonathan Miller, Patricia Hewitt, Zoë Wanamaker, Simon Weston, Anthony Grayling and Matthew Wright.

In 2005, legislative attempts were made by Lord Joffe who joined the society in the 1970s. The first bill was introduced in the 2003 session, and the Bill has been reintroduced repeatedly since. The Joffe Bill led to the formation of the anti-euthanasia organisation Care Not Killing. Dignity in Dying has a non-campaigning partner charity, Compassion in Dying, which carries out research to do with end-of-life matters, provides the general public with access to advance decisions and also works to provide information about a person's rights at the end-of-life. They are also associated with Healthcare Professionals for Assisted Dying, an organisation formed by Dignity in Dying supporter and general practitioner Ann McPherson.

In the 2010 British Social Attitudes, Dignity in Dying states 82% of the general public believed that a doctor should probably or definitely be allowed to end the life of a patient who is suffering from a painful incurable disease at the patient's request. This was further analysed to show 71% of religious people and 92% of non-religious people supported this statement.

In May 2011, Dignity in Dying noted the result of a referendum in Zurich, Switzerland, which showed overwhelming support for assisted dying and voted to reject the restriction of assisted dying services in Zurich to the residents of the city. The organisation called the result a "brave decision" on the part of the Swiss people.

==== Assisted Dying Bill ====
In 2014 Lord Falconer of Thoroton tabled an Assisted Dying Bill in the House of Lords which passed through Second Reading and ran out of time during Committee stage before the General Election. During its passage peers voted down two amendments which were proposed by opponents of the Bill. In 2015 Labour MP Rob Marris introduced an Assisted Dying Bill, based on the Falconer proposals, into the House of Commons. The Bill was praised by Philip Collins, chief leader writer for The Times as "a sophisticated and humane attempt" to clarify the law before the courts do so and which unlike religion "will actually ease suffering." Archbishop Welby's subsequent objections were described as "histrionic" and lacking any religious reason. The bill was rejected by 330 to 118. In June 2016, the Bill was re-introduced to the House of Lords by former Dignity in Dying treasurer Lord Hayward. Falconer reintroduced the bill into the House of Lords again in July 2024. In October 2024, Kim Leadbeater introduced Terminally Ill Adults (End of Life) Bill on assisted suicide.

== Activities and Funding ==
Dignity in Dying primarily campaigns for the legalisation of voluntary euthanasia and assisted suicide in the United Kingdom through legislation, lobbying, media campaigns, and public outreach. Other campaigns include promoting dignified death, outreach on "all areas relating to end of life healthcare options", and advance decisions. The organisation also publishes opinion polls supporting their campaigns.

Dignity in Dying is funded by membership subscriptions, public donations, and will bequests.

Audited accounts in 2025 report a total income of £3.146 million, comprising £1.696 million from subscriptions and general donations, £1.047 million from “High Value Donors”, £369,464 from legacies, and £33,576 from other income. The organisation does not disclose donor identities at any value level. A collective £1.02 million over 2021-2023 was donated by the Bernard Lewis Family Charitable Trust, including £700,000 in 2023, operated by the billionaire Lewis family of River Island.

== Arguments and opposition ==
One of Dignity in Dying's main arguments is that their proposals for a comprehensive strategy around the issue of assisted dying would provide safeguards and protection for an individual from, for example, the coercive pressures to die that some people believe can be exerted by families of the frail or relatively disadvantaged on occasions. Dignity in Dying argue that at the moment not only can unscrupulous people do this in a relatively unchecked way, but that the legal authorities can generally carry out investigations only after a person's death, whereas under their plans there would be safeguards and checks upfront to ensure a person was fully informed and counselled as to their rights and options and additionally protected from possible malign influences.

Dignity in Dying also state that their proposals would alleviate a great deal of the stress and worry that approaching death can bring to a person, particularly one suffering significant pain from a terminal illness. The use of Advance Decisions can help significantly but they also believe that if a right to an Assisted Death is available then the very knowledge of this fact can alleviate many of the worries an individual might have. Dignity in Dying supporters argue that the recent trends towards the use of the Dignitas clinic in Switzerland and press stories regarding botched suicides and do-it-yourself advice would be stopped because individuals would know that when and if they wished to finally request an assisted death in the UK, it would be available as arranged. Indeed, studies from parts of the world that have legalised assisted suicide report that many plans put in place for an early death are not taken up as people end up dying naturally, with the peace of mind brought about by knowing that an assisted death was available if pain and suffering had got too much. For example, in the U.S. state of Oregon in 2007, it was reported that of the 30,000 deaths in the state that year, 10,000 people considered an assisted death, around 1,000 spoke to their doctor about it, 85 actually got a prescription and just 49 went on to have an assisted death.

Dignity in Dying are often opposed by organisation such as Care Not Killing, a organisation that includes the Christian Medical Fellowship, the Church of England and the Church of Scotland. Some people of a religious persuasion take the view that all life is sacred and that only natural processes and divine intervention should determine a person's death. Dignity in Dying argue that if a person does not wish to take advantage of a change in the law which would allow for an assisted death then that is down to personal choice. Meanwhile, opponents argue that the introduction of the sort of legislation supported by Dignity in Dying can be a "slippery slope" towards more draconian measures. Dignity in Dying refutes this by pointing out that the will of Parliament would be paramount, and any change in the law would be subject to ongoing review once established. They also point out that in those jurisdictions where aid in dying has been made legal (such as the US state of Oregon), the eligibility criteria have not been widened from their initial point.

Additionally, some disability rights campaigners are concerned that an assisted dying law would lead to extra pressure on some disabled persons to seek a premature death, as they might consider their lives to be devalued. A poll in 2015 found that 86% of people with a disability believed that a person with a terminal and painful illness from which they were certain to die should be allowed an assisted death; however, polling by Scope (charity) reports that the majority of disabled people have concerns about a change in the law concerning assisted dying.

Dignity in Dying point to other parts of the world that have some form of assisted dying or similar legislation, which is generally popular and supported by the majority. These include the Netherlands and Belgium in Europe, and Oregon, Washington state and Vermont in the United States. Dignity in Dying support the legislation of assisted dying (as legal in Oregon under the Oregon Death with Dignity Act), whereby a doctor prescribes a life-ending dose of medication to a mentally competent, terminally ill adult at the patient's request, and which the patient administers. This is different to assisted suicide, whereby somebody provides assistance to die to a person who is not terminally ill, and euthanasia, which involves a third party administering the life-ending medication to a patient.

Another argument used by Dignity in Dying regards the use of the Dignitas organization in Switzerland, saying that the availability of assisted dying in Switzerland is simply "outsourcing" the problem.

Some proponents of assisted dying legislation think the proposals from Dignity in Dying do not go far enough. Organisations such as My Death My Decision and Humanists UK argue that assisted dying legislation should not be limited to those with less than six months to live, but should be available to all mentally competent adults who are suffering unbearably and incurably, irrespective of their projected lifespan. These sentiments appeared to be echoed by Supreme Court justice Lord Neuberger in the judgement of R (Nicklinson) v Ministry of Justice in 2013, when he said "Quite apart from the notorious difficulty in assessing life expectancy even for the terminally ill, there seems to me to be significantly more justification in assisting people to die if they have the prospect of living for many years a life that they regarded as valueless, miserable and often painful, than if they have only a few months left to live".

== See also ==
- Euthanasia in the United Kingdom
- Assisted suicide in the United Kingdom
