= Euthanasia in the United Kingdom =

In the United Kingdom, both euthanasia and assisted suicide are illegal.

== Passive euthanasia ==
Although it is an offence to actively end a patient's life, many doctors still assist their patients with their wishes by withholding treatment and reducing pain, according to a 2006 article in the Guardian. This is only done when the doctors feel that "death is a few days away and after consulting patients, relatives or other doctors".

=== Advance decision ===
In England and Wales, people may make an advance decision or appoint a proxy under the Mental Capacity Act 2005. By effect of this law, the Advance Decision to Refuse Treatment (ADRT) acquired statutory force among doctors, patient and their families. This is for an advanced refusal of life-saving treatment for when the person lacks mental capacity and must be considered to be valid and applicable by the medical staff concerned.

=== Permanent vegetative state ===
In July 2018 the Supreme Court of the United Kingdom ruled in An NHS Trust and others v Y (by his litigation friend, the Official Solicitor) and another that legal permission was not required to withdraw treatment from patients in a permanent vegetative state.

Subsequently, in December 2018, the British Medical Association (BMA) and the Royal College of Physicians jointly published guidance on when doctors are permitted to allow patients to die. The chair of the ethics committee at the BMA, John Chisholm, said "The aim of medical treatment is not simply to prolong life at all costs."

== Double effect doctrine ==
While euthanasia remains illegal in the United Kingdom, it is not uncommon for a patient's death to be hastened and for there to be no legal ramifications attached to the physician that caused the death. Indeed, Lord Goff ruled in Airedale NHS Trust v Bland that doctors who intentionally do everything necessary and appropriate to relieve a patient's pain and suffering, even with the foresight of possible terminal consequences, are considered legally protected when a death is hastened.

== Assisted suicide ==
Assisted suicide is related to, but distinct from, voluntary euthanasia. Voluntary euthanasia is the act of ending the life of another for the purpose of relieving their suffering. Assisted suicide is the ending of one's own life with the assistance of another. The phrase "assisted dying" is often used instead of assisted suicide by proponents of legalisation and the media when used in the context of a medically assisted suicide for the purpose of relieving suffering, and has been used by politicians when bills are proposed in parliament.

== Child euthanasia ==
The Nuffield Council on Bioethics launched an enquiry into critical care in foetal and neonatal medicine, looking at the ethical, social and legal issues which may arise when making decisions surrounding treating extremely premature babies. The report was published in November 2006.

== See also ==
- Assisted suicide in the United Kingdom
- Alfie Evans case
- All-Party Parliamentary Group for Choice at the End of Life
- Dignity in Dying
- Exit International
- Legality of euthanasia
- My Death My Decision
- Right to die
