= Government involvement in the Terri Schiavo case =

Florida case (2000–2005) on removal of life support

The legislative, executive, and judicial branches, of both the United States federal government and the State of Florida, were involved in the case of Terri Schiavo. In November 1998 Michael Schiavo, husband of Terri Schiavo, first sought permission to remove his wife's feeding tube. Schiavo had suffered brain damage in February 1990, and in February 2000 had been ruled by a Florida circuit court to be in a persistent vegetative state. Her feeding tube was removed first on April 26, 2001, but was reinserted two days later on an appeal by her parents, Bob and Mary Schindler.

The Florida statute requiring reinsertion of Schiavo's feeding tube, known as "Terri's Law," was later struck down by the Florida Supreme Court as an unconstitutional interference in the judicial system. Twenty years later, retrospective analyses have focused less on the legal outcome and more on the case's lasting political legacy, including its role in galvanizing a more assertive pro-life movement in the decades that followed.

== Florida Legislature ==
On October 10, 2003, the final remaining appeal filed by the Schindlers was dismissed. Five days later, on October 15, Schiavo's feeding tube was removed for the second time. On October 21, the Florida Legislature, in emergency session, passed "Terri's Law". This gave Florida Governor Jeb Bush the authority to intervene in the case. Gov. Bush immediately ordered the feeding tube reinserted.

On May 19, 2004, Florida Judge W. Douglas Baird overturned the law saying that it "summarily deprived Florida citizens of their right to privacy." Bush appealed the ruling to the Florida Supreme Court, and was supported by Schiavo's parents. The Schindlers obtained the legal services of the American Center for Law and Justice (ACLJ), and on June 14, the Schindlers asked the appeals court for the right to participate in the "Terri's Law" case. Michael Schiavo opposed the Governor's intervention, and was represented, in part, by the ACLU. After considering the Governor's reply, the Florida Supreme Court, on September 23, 2004, reached a unanimous decision, ruling that the legislative and executive branches of government unconstitutionally intervened in a judicial matter (against the separation of powers under the United States Constitution) and that Terri's Law was unconstitutionally retroactive legislation. The Schindlers immediately appealed to the U.S. Supreme Court. On January 24, 2005, the Supreme Court refused to hear the case.

Nineteen different Florida state court judges, at various times, considered the Schindlers' requests on appeal in six state appellate courts. While appellate courts do not consider new evidence, they do examine the evidence of the lower court for defects and rule on whether a trial is conducted properly; none of these courts found legal grounds to overturn the initial ruling; and, in seeming agreement, Florida Governor Bush, on October 17, 2003, admitted that "there is no way that he can overturn a judge's decision to remove the feeding tube." The final ruling came on February 25, 2005, when Florida Judge George Greer ordered Schiavo's feeding tube removed on March 18, 2005.

On March 17, 2005, members of the Florida House and Senate debated separate bills relating to artificially provided sustenance and hydration. The House passed its bill, which would have prohibited removal of artificially provided sustenance and hydration from a patient in a persistent vegetative state if that patient did not have an advance directive indicating that was his or her wish. Florida Senators debated the issue, but did not pass their version of the bill. On March 23, the Florida Senate again debated a similar proposed law, which failed to pass.

== U.S. Congress ==
Schiavo's feeding tube was removed again on March 18, 2005, at 1:45 p.m. EST. Around the previous midnight, U.S. Senate Majority Leader Bill Frist, a Republican from Tennessee, and Michael Enzi of Wyoming, also a Republican, announced that Schiavo would be called to testify before the U.S. Senate Committee on Health, Education, Labor, and Pensions on March 28 in Washington. Frist served on the committee; Enzi was its chairman.

On March 21, Congress passed a bill, S.686, that allowed Schiavo's case to be moved into a federal court. The controversial law is colloquially known as the Palm Sunday Compromise. It passed the Senate on Sunday afternoon unanimously, 3-0, with 97 of 100 Senators not present. Meanwhile, in the House of Representatives, deliberation ran from 9pm EST to just past midnight during an unusual Sunday session. The bill was passed 203-58 (156 Republicans and 47 Democrats in favor, 5 Republicans and 53 Democrats against), with 174 Representatives (74 Republicans and 100 Democrats) not present on the floor at the time of the vote at 12:41 a.m. EST. President Bush returned from vacation in Crawford, Texas to sign the bill into law at 1:11 that morning.

Congress also considered another bill to prevent Schiavo's death, called the "Incapacitated Person's Legal Protection Act" (H.R. 1151).

Several members of the United States Congress who are also physicians, including Senator Bill Frist (R-TN) on March 17, 2005 offered medical opinions about her medical condition without having conducted their own examinations. Congressman Phil Gingrey, who is trained in obstetrics and gynecology, stated that, "The tragedy of the situation is that with proper treatment, now denied, Terri's condition can improve".

=== Subpoenas ===
Republican leaders in the House of Representatives, including Speaker Dennis Hastert of Illinois, Tom DeLay of Texas and Tom Davis of Virginia, opened a congressional inquiry of the House Government Reform Committee, which was to take place in Clearwater on March 25, and issued subpoenas for Terri and Michael Schiavo and several hospice workers. Because of her condition, Terri Schiavo obviously would not have been able to testify; however, the subpoena gave her federal protection as a prospective witness, as it is a federal crime to prevent a person from testifying before Congress. Greer opted to ignore the subpoenas, telling congressional attorneys over a conference call "I have had no cogent reason why the (congressional) committee should intervene." This was upheld by the Florida Supreme Court. Although US Senate Majority Leader Bill Frist, Sen. Rick Santorum, and Rep. Tom Delay, brought the possibility of sanctioning Florida Judge Greer on charges of Contempt of Congress, Congress did not attempt to enforce the subpoenas or take any action against Florida Judge Greer.

=== Politicians ===
Some conservatives, such as former Representative Bob Barr, expressed concern about the implications for federalism of a bill that involved the federal government in a matter traditionally left to the states. Some Democrats simply stayed away from the controversy.

Republican Representative Tom DeLay of Texas and Senator Bill Frist of Tennessee, a cardiac surgeon, spoke in favor of keeping Schiavo on the feeding tube, as did President George W. Bush. Critics say that Frist's stance on this issue appears to indicate a reversal in his personal opinion, as he has previously argued for the definition of brain death to be extended to include anencephalic conditions of the type seen in this case. Democratic Senators Tom Harkin and Kent Conrad also supported federal intervention in the Schiavo case, although Republican Representative Dave Reichert was against it. Especially outspoken Democratic members of Congress who have protested the federal intervention include Henry Waxman, Robert Wexler, Barney Frank, and Debbie Wasserman Schultz.

On March 22, 2005, the Los Angeles Times reported on then-Texas Governor George W. Bush's signing of a 1999 bill, the Advance Directives Act, that allowed medical professionals to remove life support from a patient, even over the objections of family members, if the hospital determined that there was no further hope for the patient (the bill allows the hospital to take into account inability to pay the health insurance carrier of the patient). A doctor's recommendation must be approved by a hospital's ethics committee, and the family must be given 10 days from written notice of the decision to try to locate another facility for the patient. A number of people felt that Bush's support for the law—one of only three in the nation—was inconsistent with his position in the Schiavo case. White House Press Secretary Scott McClellan said that those raising the 1999 bill were "uninformed" and that the "legislation that he signed into law actually "provided new protections for patients". Critics note that Bush did give his support to medical professionals making end-of-life decisions for patients unable to express their wishes, such as Sun Hudson, a six-month-old boy born with thanatophoric dysplasia. His breathing tube was removed that week at Texas Children's Hospital over the objection of his mother, Wanda.

On March 26, 2005, the Los Angeles Times reported that DeLay and his family decided in 1988 to allow his father to die after he was badly injured in a tram accident. "Extraordinary measures to prolong life were not initiated," said the medical report of DeLay's father, and cited "agreement with the family's wishes." The Los Angeles Times contrasted this with DeLay's current stance on the Schiavo case.

By contrast, former Presidential candidate Jesse Jackson, stood by the Schindlers and urged the Florida legislature to reinsert Schiavo's feeding tube. He stated, "This is a moral issue and it transcends politics and family disputes."

=== Talking points memo ===
A talking points memo was written by Brian Darling, legal counsel for junior Florida Senator Mel Martinez. The memo suggested the Schiavo case offered "a great political issue" that would appeal to the party's base and could be used against US Senator Bill Nelson, a Democrat from Florida who would go on to win his bid for reelection in 2006, because he had refused to co-sponsor the Palm Sunday Compromise. Darling later resigned when he admitted to being its author 19 days after its disclosure, and that he wrote it without authorization from his superiors.

Martinez said that he inadvertently gave the memo to Democratic Senator Tom Harkin of Iowa. Thence it became public knowledge. Several Democratic senators believed it represented a larger plan on the part of Republican leadership.

== U.S. Courts ==
=== U.S. District Court ===
Schiavo's parents, Bob and Mary Schindler, filed a request for an emergency injunction with the U.S. District Court for the Middle District of Florida in Tampa, FL on March 21. The claims were chiefly that the rulings of the state court judges were biased or unfair and that removal of the feeding tube constituted a risk that Schiavo, as a Roman Catholic, would face extended time in purgatory. A two-hour hearing on the injunction was held on March 21 before Judge James D. Whittemore.

Early on March 22, Judge Whittemore refused to order the feeding tube reinserted. In his opinion, he applied the mandatory four-prong test set out by the 11th Circuit for preliminary injunctions, and concluded that the Schindlers were "exceedingly unlikely to prevail on the merits of the case," one of the test's four prongs.

=== U.S. Court of Appeals ===
The judgment was appealed. In the early morning of March 23, 2005, the 11th Circuit Court of Appeals in Atlanta denied the request to reinsert the feeding tube. The three-judge panel ruled 2-1. The majority opinion agreed with the district court that the Schindlers had failed to prove one of the four required prongs: that they had "failed to demonstrate a substantial case on the merits of any of their claims." In affirming the district court's analysis, the panel pointed out that Congress had considered the issue of expressly directing the district court to order the reinsertion of the feeding tube pending litigation on the merits, and had refrained from including such a directive. Thus, Congress had left the 11th Circuit's existing procedural law in place, and the district judge had applied the circuit's existing test correctly. Congress did have the power to override the 11th Circuit's mandatory four-prong test pursuant to the Rules Enabling Act, but chose not to do so.

Later that day, the 11th Circuit Court refused to rehear the case as a whole (en banc). Two of the twelve judges wrote dissenting opinions, but the actual vote is not public record. On March 30, the Court agreed to consider a petition by the Schindlers parents to have a new hearing to decide whether the feeding tube should be reinserted. Later that day, the court denied the petition. Judge Stanley F. Birch Jr., a 1990 George H. W. Bush appointee, in a concurring opinion, rebuked President Bush and Congress: "In resolving the Schiavo controversy, it is my judgment that, despite sincere and altruistic motivation, the legislative and executive branches of our government have acted in a manner demonstrably at odds with our Founding Fathers' blueprint for the governance of a free people - our Constitution."

"Because the special legislation passed by Congress and signed by President Bush "constitutes legislative dictation of how a federal court should exercise its judicial functions (known as a 'rule of decision') the Act invades the province of the judiciary and violates the separation of powers principle." To hold otherwise, Judge Birch concluded, would be to act in a manner consistent with the label "activist judge."

=== U.S. Supreme Court ===
The Schindlers appealed again to the U.S. Supreme Court late on the night of March 23. They argued that Congress intended for the feeding tube to be reinserted when they passed the "Relief of the Parents of Theresa Marie Schiavo Act" (S 686 ES). The case first went to Justice Anthony Kennedy, who is responsible for all emergency appeals from the 11th Circuit. Although he could have acted alone, Kennedy chose to refer the case to the entire Supreme Court.

The Court declined to grant certiorari on the morning of March 24 in an unsigned one-sentence order (as is typical for nearly all rejections of appeals). One reason the Court may not have accepted the case is that doing so might force the Court to develop a uniform nationwide test for the issuance of preliminary injunctions under Rule 65 of the Federal Rules of Civil Procedure. The Court has consistently denied review in every case raising that possibility for the past few decades, which is why every circuit has its own test for when such injunctions should be issued.

As noted above, Congress has never stepped in to resolve the circuit split on the test for preliminary injunctions, and did not do so in this case, even though it has the power to do so under the Rules Enabling Act. Unfortunately for the plaintiffs, Schiavo happened to be a resident of the 11th Circuit, which has the most difficult-to-overcome test of any federal appellate court. Most other circuits have more flexible tests with sliding scales which allow the court to place more weight on allegations of extreme hardship for the plaintiff if the injunction or TRO is not granted. Plaintiffs' attorneys seeking preliminary injunctions prefer the plaintiff-friendly 2nd and 9th Circuits whenever possible, but that was not an option in this case; district courts in those circuits would have lacked personal jurisdiction over the parties.

== Florida governor and executive ==
Following the Supreme Court's refusal to review the case, Florida Governor Jeb Bush announced that he was going to investigate whether the Florida Department of Children and Families could take over Schiavo's care, on the grounds that the organization has the legal right to gain custody of incapacitated adults in emergency situations. On March 24, 2005, Judge Greer issued an injunction stopping the state government from doing so. Bush then announced that he would take no action, because he had exhausted his legal options, and declined to appeal Judge Greer's injunction.

At the time, there was a great deal of concern over what would happen if the Florida Department of Law Enforcement (FDLE) or the Florida National Guard were ordered to take custody of Schiavo. As Greer had ordered all Florida law enforcement to enforce his orders, any attempt by other police forces to take Schiavo would likely have led to a confrontation between them and the members of the Pinellas Park Police Department at the hospice. If this had happened, it may have very well caused a constitutional crisis.

== Aftermath ==
Terri Schiavo died on March 31, 2005, thirteen days after the removal of the feeding tube. Prior to and in the wake of Schiavo's death, end of life legislation has been proposed in at least ten states. These bills address the right to die as well as the right to life. Legislators are attempting to clarify the laws that govern the fate of a person in Schiavo's position, and in some cases make living wills more available. This could be partly because, as of 2005, it is estimated that only 33 percent of Americans have a living will (but all 50 states have laws that allow people to write an advance directive). States where new end of life legislation has been proposed includes: Alabama, Hawaii, Louisiana, Michigan, Minnesota, Missouri, Nevada, and South Dakota.

=== Bills ===
The Alabama Starvation and Dehydration Prevention Act would forbid the removal of a feeding tube without express written instructions from the patient. A similar bill is found in Louisiana, where it is named the Human Dignity Act. In Missouri, Republican Representative Cynthia Davis introduced a bill on the day Terri Schiavo died. Like other bills, her legislation would bar anyone from withholding or withdrawing artificial life support without a written directive from the patient. In Michigan, a legislator is proposing a bill that would ban adulterers from making decisions for an incapacitated spouse.

In Nevada, a measure has been proposed that would let a guardian end life-sustaining measures against a patient's known wishes, as long as it is in the best interests of the patient.

=== See also ===
- The Case of Terri Schiavo: Ethics at the End of Life. Arthur Caplan, James J. McCartney, Dominic Sisti, editors (2006) ISBN 1-59102-398-X
- Constitutional Commentary, THE SCHIAVO CASE: A SYMPOSIUM (Volume 22, Winter 2005, Number 3)

== Other documents ==
Documents related to Schiavo case, in general

- From Terri's family's official family site
- Find Law compilation
- HPA's Terri Schindler Schiavo Documents and Links Page
- Tampa Bay Online's compilation (Links to docs near bottom right corner of page)
- Related Stories and documents from Tampa Bay Online
- Selected PDF files from Jeb Bush's official website (Includes "Statement by Governor Jeb Bush Regarding Theresa Schiavo," dated Wednesday, November 19, 2003)
- Selected Documents, Timeline, and Questions & Answers (From "Abstract Appeal" legal blog of Attorney Matt Conigliaro)
- Selected Schiavo/PVS bibliography, Timeline, and other links (From University of Miami, Ethics Program)
- Chicago Tribune compilation of Schiavo links (Eric Zorn, Tribune columnist)

=== U.S. Congressional record ===
Full overview

- Schiavo search
- Schindler search

March 9, 2005

- Legislation Addessing the Schiavo Case (in anticipation of March 18)

Thursday, March 17

- 3 versions of Bill Number S.653
- S. 653, A Bill
- S.653 Passed Senate, without amendment
- Mr. Frist calls Senate to order

Monday, March 21

- Roll call vote on S.686 in the House of Representatives

April 5

- Three Schiavo Extensions of Remarks

April 6

- H.1824 Judicial Power Grab

=== Florida legislature ===
See Florida Legislative Record for starting point.

October 20, 2003

- Special Session call

October 21

- Executive Order Number 03-201

November 19

- Jeb Bush statement

March 24, 2005

- Notice of Filing

April 16, 2005

- Terri Schiavo Records: Part 1, Part 2, Part 3

=== Advocacy and commentary ===
Pro-Terri's Law

- Official website of Terri Schiavo's family

Anti-Terri's Law

- "ACLU Online: Schiavo Case, Same-Sex Marriage Victory and more". Legalminds.lp.findlaw.com. 2005-03-24.
- "Columns: Passion invested in Terri's Law must somehow give way to reason". Sptimes.com.
- "/ News / Boston Globe / Opinion / Editorials / Exploiting Terri Schiavo". Boston.com. 2005-03-22.
