= 2006 United States Senate election in Florida =

- November 7, 2006
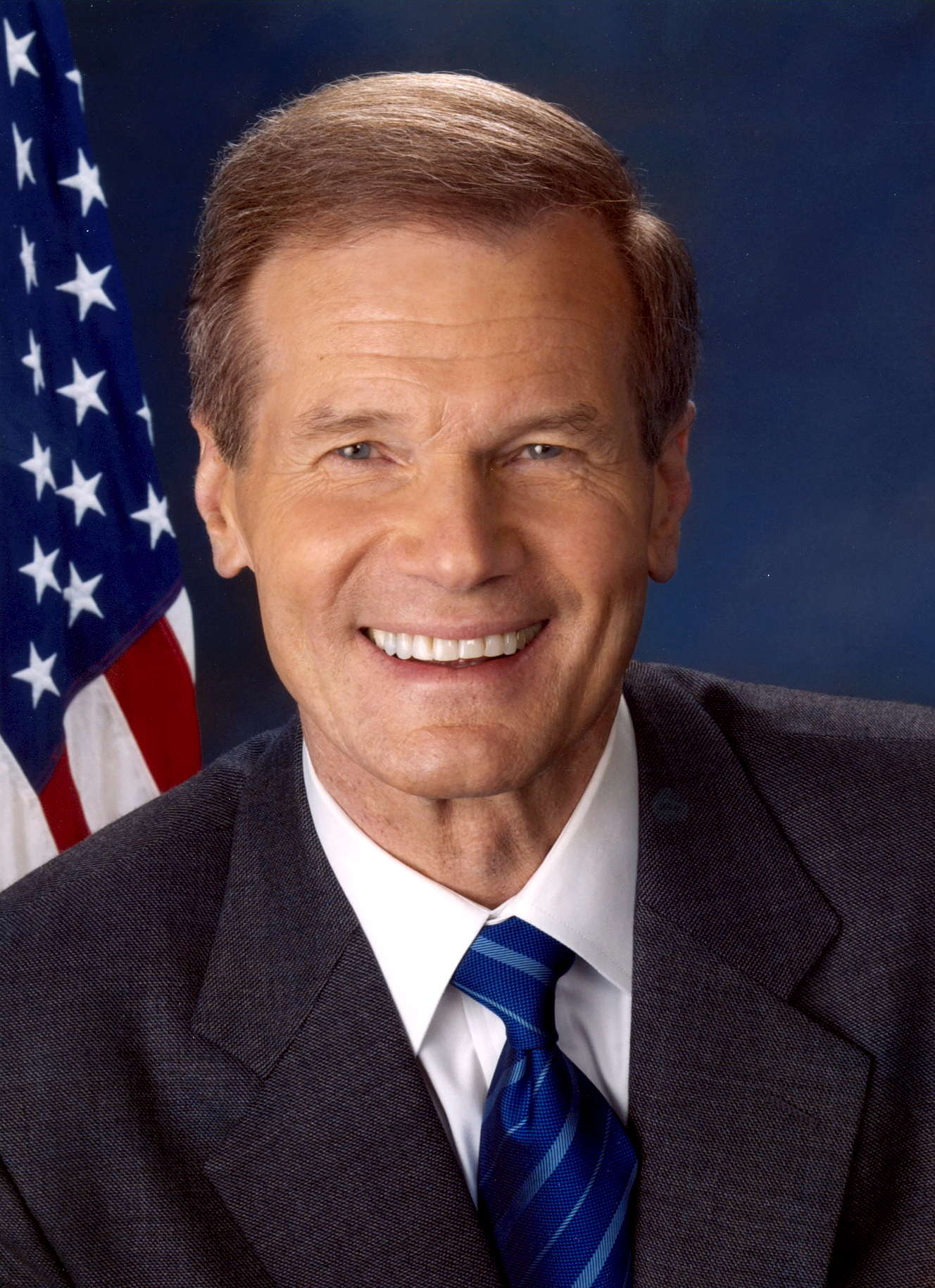

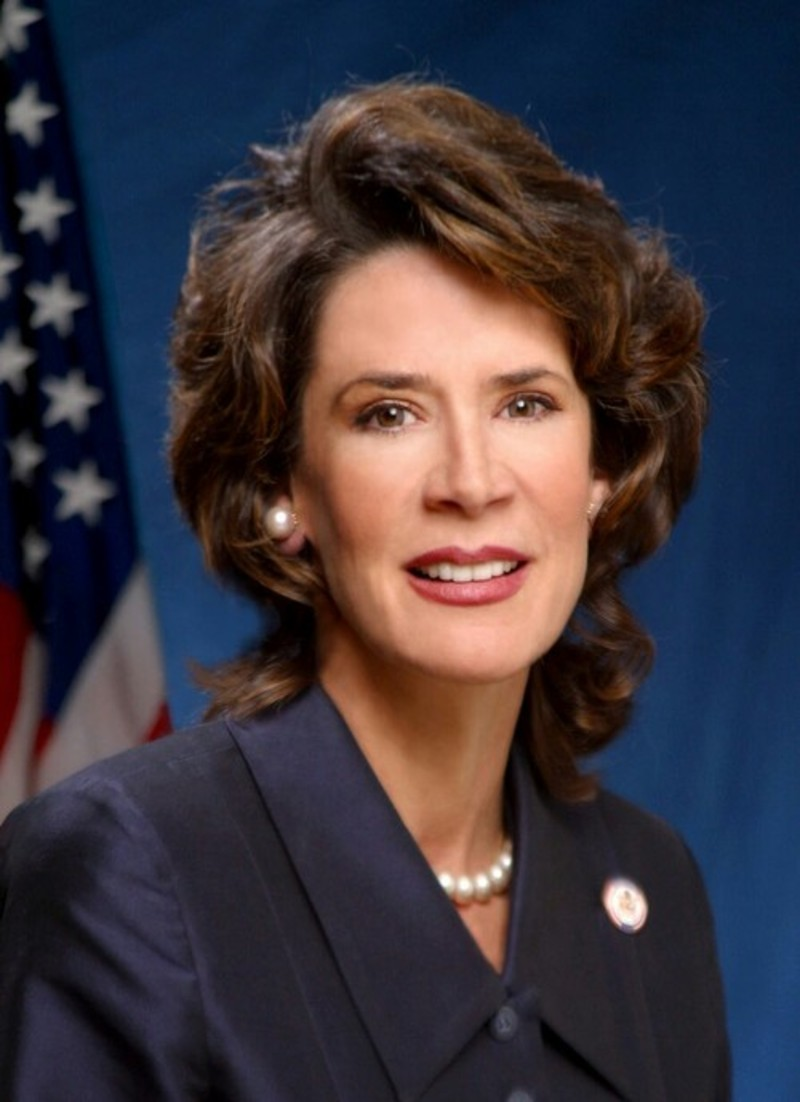
| Nominee | Bill Nelson | Katherine Harris |
| Party | Democratic | Republican |
| Popular vote | 2,890,548 | 1,826,127 |
| Percentage | 60.30% | 38.10% |
- County results Nelson: 40–50% 50–60% 60–70% 70–80% 80–90% Harris: 40–50% 50–60% 60–70%
U.S. senator before election
Bill Nelson
Democratic
Elected U.S. Senator
Bill Nelson
Democratic

The 2006 United States Senate election in Florida was held on November 7, 2006. Incumbent Democratic U.S. Senator Bill Nelson won re-election to a second term.

== Background ==
During the Terri Schiavo case in March 2005, a talking points memo on the controversy was written by Brian Darling, the legal counsel to Republican Senator Mel Martínez of Florida. The memo suggested the Schiavo case offered "a great political issue" that would appeal to the party's base (core supporters) and could be used against Senator Bill Nelson, a Democrat from Florida who was up for reelection in 2006, because he had refused to co-sponsor the bill which came to be known as the Palm Sunday Compromise. Bill Nelson was nevertheless reelected as Senator on November 7, 2006, with 60% of the vote.

Florida was one of five Democratic-held Senate seats up for election in a state that George W. Bush won in the 2004 presidential election.

== Republican primary ==
=== Candidates ===
- LeRoy Collins Jr., retired naval officer and son of former Governor LeRoy Collins
- Katherine Harris, U.S. representative and former Florida secretary of state
- Will McBride, attorney
- Peter Monroe, businessman and former COO of the Federal Housing Administration

=== Declined ===
- Jeb Bush, governor of Florida 1999–2007

=== Endorsements ===
- The Bradenton Herald: McBride
- Florida (Jacksonville) Times-Union: Collins or Monroe
- Gainesville Sun: Collins
- Lakeland Ledger: Collins
- Miami Herald: Collins
- Naples Daily News: Collins
- Orlando Sentinel: McBride
- Palm Beach Post: Monroe
- Sarasota Herald-Tribune: no endorsement
- South Florida (Fort Lauderdale) Sun Sentinel: Monroe
- St. Petersburg Times: Collins
- Tampa Tribune: Collins

=== Polling ===
| Poll Source | Date | LeRoy Collins Jr. | Katherine Harris | Will McBride | Peter Monroe |
|---|---|---|---|---|---|
| Strategic Vision | July 26, 2006 | 9% | 45% | 22% | 7% |
| Mason-Dixon | July 26, 2006 | 8% | 36% | 11% | 2% |
| Quinnipiac | July 27, 2006 | 6% | 40% | 21% | 3% |
| Scroth Eldon & Associates | August 11, 2006 | 9% | 28% | 11% | 5% |
| SurveyUSA | August 24, 2006 | 20% | 43% | 15% | 7% |
| Strategic Vision | August 30, 2006 | 19% | 38% | 21% | 5% |
| Quinnipiac | August 31, 2006 | 11% | 38% | 22% | 3% |
| SurveyUSA | August 31, 2006 | 12% | 45% | 22% | 5% |
| Mason-Dixon | September 2, 2006 | 17% | 38% | 21% | 2% |
| Primary Results | September 5, 2006 | 15% | 49% | 30% | 5% |

Republican primary results by county Harris: 30–40%; 40–50%; 50–60%; 60–70%; 70–80%; McBride: 30–40%

=== Results ===
Republican primary results
| Party | Candidate | Votes | % |
|---|---|---|---|
| Republican | Katherine Harris | 474,871 | 49.4 |
| Republican | Will McBride | 287,741 | 30.0 |
| Republican | LeRoy Collins Jr. | 146,712 | 15.3 |
| Republican | Peter Monroe | 51,330 | 5.3 |
| Total votes | | 960,654 | 100.0 |

== General election ==
=== Candidates ===
- Floyd Ray Frazier (Independent)
- Katherine Harris, former Florida secretary of state and former U.S. representative (Republican)
- Brian Moore, retired health care executive and former congressional candidate (Independent)
- Bill Nelson, incumbent U.S. senator (Democratic)
- Belinda Noah (Independent)
- Roy Tanner (Independent)

=== Campaign ===
The organization Citizens for Responsibility and Ethics in Washington (CREW), which monitors political corruption, complained to the Federal Election Commission (FEC) in October 2006 that the Bacardi beverage company had illegally used corporate resources in support of a fundraising event for Nelson in 2005. CREW had previously filed a similar complaint concerning a Bacardi fundraising event for Republican Senator Mel Martinez, an event that raised as much as $60,000 for Martinez's campaign. The amended complaint alleged that, on both occasions, Bacardi violated the Federal Election Campaign Act and FEC regulations by soliciting contributions from a list of the corporation's vendors.

=== Endorsements ===
In a rare move, all twenty-two of Florida's daily newspapers supported Nelson, while none supported Harris in the general election. The only paper to endorse Harris was the Polk County Democrat in Bartow, Harris's hometown.

- Bradenton Herald: Bill Nelson
- Charlotte Sun-Herald: Bill Nelson
- Daytona Beach News-Journal: Bill Nelson
- Florida Times-Union: Bill Nelson
- Fort Myers News-Press: Bill Nelson
- Gainesville Sun: Bill Nelson
- Lakeland Ledger: Bill Nelson
- Miami Herald: Bill Nelson
- Naples Daily News: Bill Nelson
- Orlando Sentinel: Bill Nelson
- Palm Beach Post: Bill Nelson
- Pensacola News Journal: Bill Nelson
- Saint Petersburg Times: Bill Nelson
- Sarasota Herald-Tribune: Bill Nelson
- Scripps Treasure Coast Newspapers: Bill Nelson
- South Florida Sun-Sentinel: Bill Nelson
- Tallahassee Democrat: Bill Nelson
- Tampa Tribune: Bill Nelson
- Polk County Democrat: Katherine Harris

=== Debates ===
- Complete video of debate, October 23, 2006
- Complete video of debate, November 1, 2006

=== Predictions ===
| Source | Ranking | As of |
|---|---|---|
| The Cook Political Report | Solid D | November 6, 2006 |
| Sabato's Crystal Ball | Safe D | November 6, 2006 |
| Rothenberg Political Report | Safe D | November 6, 2006 |
| Real Clear Politics | Safe D | November 6, 2006 |

=== Polling ===
Graphical summary

View source data.

| Poll source | Date | Bill Nelson (D) | Katherine Harris (R) |
|---|---|---|---|
| Strategic Vision (R) | July 20, 2005 | 48% | 40% |
| Strategic Vision (R) | August 21, 2005 | 47% | 38% |
| Quinnipiac | August 31, 2005 | 57% | 33% |
| Strategic Vision (R) | September 22, 2005 | 48% | 36% |
| Rasmussen | November 14, 2005 | 53% | 36% |
| Quinnipiac | November 15, 2005 | 55% | 31% |
| Strategic Vision (R) | November 30, 2005 | 48% | 32% |
| Rasmussen | January 5, 2006 | 54% | 31% |
| Rasmussen | February 14, 2006 | 49% | 40% |
| Strategic Vision (R) | February 22, 2006 | 49% | 34% |
| Quinnipiac | February 24, 2006 | 53% | 31% |
| University of North Florida | March 15, 2006 | 48% | 28% |
| Mason-Dixon | March 29, 2006 | 51% | 35% |
| Strategic Vision (R) | March 30, 2006 | 56% | 28% |
| Zogby/WSJ | March 31, 2006 | 50% | 37% |
| Rasmussen | April 14, 2006 | 57% | 27% |
| Quinnipiac | April 20, 2006 | 56% | 27% |
| Strategic Vision (R) | April 26, 2006 | 56% | 24% |
| Rasmussen | May 22, 2006 | 60% | 33% |
| Strategic Vision (R) | May 25, 2006 | 56% | 26% |
| Quinnipiac | May 25, 2006 | 58% | 25% |
| Zogby/WSJ | June 21, 2006 | 51% | 33% |
| Strategic Vision (R) | June 28, 2006 | 61% | 26% |
| Quinnipiac | June 30, 2006 | 59% | 26% |
| Zogby/WSJ | July 24, 2006 | 55% | 34% |
| Strategic Vision (R) | July 26, 2006 | 60% | 22% |
| Mason-Dixon | July 26, 2006 | 57% | 29% |
| Quinnipiac | July 27, 2006 | 61% | 24% |
| Rasmussen | July 28, 2006 | 61% | 33% |
| St. Petersburg Times | August 11, 2006 | 60% | 25% |
| Zogby/WSJ | August 28, 2006 | 52% | 32% |
| Strategic Vision (R) | August 30, 2006 | 63% | 20% |
| Rasmussen | September 5, 2006 | 57% | 34% |
| Zogby/WSJ | September 11, 2006 | 51% | 33% |
| SurveyUSA | September 14, 2006 | 53% | 38% |
| Mason-Dixon | September 20–22, 2006 | 53% | 35% |
| Strategic Vision (R) | September 27, 2006 | 59% | 31% |
| Rasmussen | September 27, 2006 | 56% | 33% |
| Rasmussen | October 4, 2006 | 54% | 37% |
| SurveyUSA | October 10, 2006 | 55% | 37% |
| Quinnipiac | October 11, 2006 | 61% | 33% |
| Mason-Dixon | October 16–17, 2006 | 57% | 31% |
| Strategic Vision (R) | October 25, 2006 | 58% | 35% |
| Quinnipiac | October 25, 2006 | 64% | 29% |
| St. Petersburg Times | October 28, 2006 | 56% | 30% |
| Strategic Vision (R) | November 2, 2006 | 59% | 33% |
| Mason-Dixon | November 3, 2006 | 58% | 34% |
| SurveyUSA | November 5, 2006 | 59% | 36% |

=== Results ===
As expected, Nelson was easily reelected. He won with 60.3% of the vote, winning by 1,064,421 votes or 22.2%, and carried 57 of Florida's 67 counties. Nelson was projected the winner almost immediately when the polls closed at 7 P.M. EST.

General election results
| Party | Candidate | Votes | % | ±% |
|---|---|---|---|---|
| Democratic | Bill Nelson (incumbent) | 2,890,548 | 60.30% | +9.26% |
| Republican | Katherine Harris | 1,826,127 | 38.10% | −8.09% |
| Independent | Belinda Noah | 24,880 | 0.52% | n/a |
| Independent | Brian Moore | 19,695 | 0.41% | n/a |
| Independent | Floyd Ray Frazier | 16,628 | 0.35% | n/a |
| Independent | Roy Tanner | 15,562 | 0.32% | n/a |
| Write-in | | 94 | 0.00% | n/a |
| Majority | | 1,064,421 | 22.21% | +17.36% |
| Turnout | | 4,793,534 | | |
| Democratic hold | | Swing | | |

==== Counties that flipped from Republican to Democratic ====
- Gilchrist (largest city: Trenton)
- Sumter (largest city: The Villages)
- Bradford (largest city: Starke)
- Charlotte (largest city: Charlotte)
- Columbia (largest city: Lake City)
- DeSoto (largest city: Arcadia)
- Escambia (largest city: Pensacola)
- Hardee (largest city: Wachula)
- Highlands (largest city: Sebring)
- Indian River (largest city: Sebastian)
- Lake (largest city: Clermont)
- Lee (largest city: Cape Coral)
- Suwannee (largest city: Live Oak)
- Duval (largest municipality: Jacksonville)
- Seminole (largest municipality: Sanford)
- Hendry (largest city: Clewiston)
- Marion (largest city: Ocala)

== See also ==
- 2006 United States Senate elections
- 2006 Florida gubernatorial election
- 2006 Florida state elections
- 2006 United States House of Representatives elections in Florida
