= Terri Schiavo timeline =

Summary of Terri Schiavo's life by year

Timeline :	1963 1982 1984 1986 1989 1990 1991 1992 1993 1994 1995 1998 1999 2000 2001 2002 2003 2004 2005

== 1963 ==
- December 3: Terri Schindler is born in the Huntingdon Valley area of Lower Moreland Township, Pennsylvania.

== 1981 ==
- Terri graduates from Archbishop Wood Catholic High School.
- At 200 lb (91 kg) pounds, Terri loses 60 pounds (30 kg) with a NutriSystem diet in a year. Dr. Ickler supervising.

== 1982 ==
- Terri meets Michael Schiavo in a sociology class at Bucks County Community College in Newtown, Pennsylvania.
- Five months later, Terri and Michael get engaged; Terri leaves college.

== 1984 ==
- November: Michael Schiavo and Terri Schindler are married. Terri weighs 145 lb (66 kg). They live outside of Philadelphia.

== 1985 ==
- May: Terri misses her period. She sees Dr. Mambu thinking she is pregnant. She is not.

== 1986 ==
- April: Michael and Terri move to the Schindlers' condo in St. Petersburg, Florida. Terri weighs 145 lb (66 kg). Terri begins to lose weight again.

== 1987 ==
- Terri sees Dr. Prawer, the family physician. Her weight is 121 lb (55 kg).

== 1989 ==
- Dr. Prawer refers Terri to Dr. Igel, an OB-GYN, because she misses her period. Terri weighs 121 lb (55 kg).

== 1990 ==
- February 25: Terri suffers from a collapse and falls into a coma.
- May: Terri emerges from her coma but remains unconscious. Primary physician is Dr. Shah. Dr. Baras, from Bayfront Rehabilitation, a rehab consult, recommends that she be transferred to Mediplex or Hardy Memorial.
- May 12: Terri is discharged from Humana to College Harbor Nursing Home, where she stays for 50 days.
- June 18: Court appoints Michael Schiavo as Terri's legal guardian. The Schindlers say they did not know.
- June 30: Prudential terminates insurance coverage. Terri leaves College Harbor, is admitted to Bayfront Hospital, a state designated facility for brain injuries, for ten weeks, at the Schindlers' expense. On admission, Terri is "awake and eyes open.... (W)ill close her eyes to (threats around) her face.... Verbal output has been reported by ... therapists at College Harbor".
- September 1: Terri is taken home, to Vina del Mar, for 100 days with Michael at the Schindlers'; Michael takes nursing classes. They are overwhelmed by the G-tube emergencies and coughing fits and take Terri back to College Harbor for a few weeks.
- December: Michael takes Terri to UCSF in California for a week, for an experimental procedure to implant a thalamic stimulator in her brain. Then she goes to Meadowbrooke in San Jose for a month of rehab.

== 1991 ==
- January: Michael and Terri return from California to Florida. Terri is admitted to Mediplex Rehabilitation Center in Bradenton.
- February: Terri expresses signs of pain during physical therapy. Bone scan ordered.
- 5 March: Dr. W. Campbell Walker performs a bone scan on Terri. The scan shows prior traumatic injuries to multiple ribs (on both sides), both sacroiliac joints, both knees, both ankles, several thoracic vertebrae, and her right thigh. In addition, the scan shows a minor compression fracture of her L1 vertebra.
- July 19: Terri is transferred from Mediplex to Sable Palms for custodial care.
- Michael begins studying nursing at St. Petersburg Community College to better care for his wife. He eventually becomes a respiratory therapist and an emergency room nurse.
- Dr. Victor Gambone, Terri Schiavo's primary care physician, concludes that she is in an irreversible persistent vegetative state (PVS).
- The Schindlers (Terri's parents) actively encourage Michael to "get on with his life" and date. Michael introduces the Schindlers to the woman he is dating, Cindi Shook.

== 1992 ==
- May: Michael Schiavo and the Schindlers stop living together.
- August: Michael meets his future wife, Jodi Anne Centonze, at a dentist's office. Shortly after meeting, they begin to date each other.
- Michael brings a medical malpractice suit against Dr. Stephen Igel, the ob/gyn who had been treating Terri. Jury finds the obstetrician had not properly diagnosed Terri's condition. The case is appealed.
- November: Settlement with Dr. Igel. $750k for Terri's care, $300k for himself.
- November 5: Testimony of Michael Schiavo indicates he is attending nursing classes at St. Pete Junior College in order to help his wife.

== 1993 ==
- January: The medical malpractice suit against Terri's obstetrician is settled before an appeal is decided. Terri receives $750,000. Michael receives $300,000. Terri's award is placed in a trust fund controlled by a third party for her medical care.
- February 14: Michael Schiavo and the Schindlers disagree over the course of treatment and therapy for Terri Schiavo. Michael Schiavo claims that the Schindlers demanded that he share the malpractice money with them. The parties are no longer on speaking terms following this event.
- July 29: The Schindlers begin to challenge Michael Schiavo's guardianship of Terri Schiavo and attempt to remove him as legal guardian.

== 1994 ==
- March 1: Guardian ad litem John H. Pecarek submits his report which states that Michael Schiavo acted appropriately and attentively toward Terri Schiavo.
- In March, Terri is moved to Palm Garden of Largo, a skilled nursing facility in Seminole, Florida.
- The administration of one nursing home attempts, unsuccessfully, to get a restraining order against Michael because he was demanding more attention for his wife at the expense of other patients' care.
- Michael accepts the diagnosis that Terri is in an irreversible persistent vegetative state. In consultation with Terri's physician, Schiavo halts most therapy for his wife.
- Terri develops a urinary tract infection. Following a doctor's recommendation, Michael chooses not to treat it. Michael enters a "do not resuscitate" order, which he later rescinds after the parents protest.

== 1995 ==
- Michael begins his relationship with Jodi Centonze.

== 1998 ==
- May: Michael Schiavo files a petition to discontinue feeding tube for Terri Schiavo. Terri's parents fight the petition.
- June: Richard Pearse, Esq. is appointed guardian ad litem for Terri Schiavo by the Circuit Court for Pinellas County, Florida.
- September 11: Dr. Jeffrey Karp neurologically evaluates Terri and indicates that she "is in a chronic vegetative state" exhibiting "an absence of voluntary activity or cognitive behavior...inability to communicate or interact purposefully with her environment." Karp also notes that "her chance of any improvement to a functional level is essentially zero."
- Dr. Gambone, Terri's primary care physician, informs guardian ad litem Richard Pearse that Dr. Karp's PVS diagnosis (and prognosis) is the medical consensus.
- November: Terri's parents become aware of the bone scan report that was performed in 1991. Terri's parents and Dr. William Hammesfahr claim the trauma shown in the bone scan was a result of Terri being abused by Michael. Provided with only the scan information, forensic pathologist, Dr. Michael Baden suggests a head injury caused the trauma. After learning Terri's full history, Dr. Baden agrees that the trauma is consistent with her cardiac arrest, fall, CPR attempts, and eventual resuscitation. The parents petition the Pinellas-Pasco Circuit Court for a full evidentiary hearing to evaluate the new evidence. Judge George Greer denies the motion.
- December 29: The second guardian ad litem, Richard Pearse, submits his report to the Pinellas-Pasco County Circuit Court. Pearse concludes that Terri Schiavo is in a persistent vegetative state with no possibility of improvement and that Michael Schiavo's decisions may be influenced by the potential to inherit what remains of Terri Schiavo's estate. Due to a perceived lack of evidence for Terri's wishes, and questions regarding Michael Schiavo's credibility, Pearse recommends denying Michael Schiavo's petition to remove Terri's feeding tube.

== 2000 ==
- Michael is issued a license for nursing by the State of Florida, Department of Health.
- February: As a result of Michael's petition in 1998, the court rules that Terri would choose to have the tube removed.
- April: Terri is transferred to Woodside Hospice in Pinellas Park.

== 2001 ==
- Dr. Ron Cranford, neurologist, assesses Terri's brain function as part of a court-ordered examination. His exam shows that Terri's cerebral cortex has been completely destroyed; he finds that her upper brain is 80% destroyed, and there is much damage to the lower brain.
- April 26: Terri's feeding tube is removed for the first time. It is reinserted two days later on an appeal by her parents.

== 2002 ==
- A trial is held to determine whether or not new therapy treatments would help Terri restore any cognitive function.

A new CAT scan shows severe cerebral atrophy. An EEG shows no measurable brain activity.

Five doctors are selected to provide their expert opinions to the trial. Schiavo's parents select Dr. William Maxfield, a retired radiologist, and Dr. William Hammesfahr, a neurologist. Michael Schiavo selects neurologists Dr. Ron Cranford and Dr. Melvin Greer (no relation to Judge George Greer). The court selects neurologist Dr. Peter Bambakidis. These five doctors examine Terri Schiavo's medical records, brain scans, the videos, and Schiavo herself.

Drs. Cranford, Greer, and Bambakidis testify that Terri was in a persistent vegetative state. Dr. Maxfield and Dr. Hammesfahr testify that Schiavo was in a "minimally conscious state."

Terri's parents videotape Terri for four and a half hours. The video is edited down to several clips totaling four and a half minutes.

Judge Greer rules that Terri Schiavo is in a PVS and was beyond hope of significant improvement.

- Fall 2002: Jodi Centonze gives birth to her first child with Michael.
- November 22: Judge Greer denies a motion from Terri's parents for a full evidentiary hearing to evaluate new evidence, the 1990 bone scan, which had only recently come to their attention. Greer states that the issue of trauma twelve years earlier was irrelevant to the current case.
- Florida's Second District Court of Appeal reviews previous court records and upholds the trial court's decision.

== 2003 ==
- September 11: The Schindlers petition the Pinellas County court for the Sixth Judicial Circuit. The petition asks the court to forestall any removal of the feeding tube for "eight weeks' therapy." Accompanying the petition are five affidavits: four from members of the Schindler family (presumably her mother, father, brother, and sister) and one from Dr. Alexander T. Gimon. Additional affidavits from three "speech professionals" and two nurses are included.
- September 17: Judge Greer issues a nine-page court ruling, rejecting the petition.
- October 10: The final remaining appeal filed by the Schindlers is dismissed.
- October 15: Terri's feeding tube is removed for the second time.
- October 21: The Florida Legislature passes "Terri's Law." Governor Jeb Bush immediately orders the feeding tube reinserted.
- December: Dr. Jay Wolfson reports to Governor Bush, "within the testimony, as part of the hypotheticals presented, Schindler family members stated that even if (Terri) had told them of her intention to have artificial nutrition withdrawn, they would not do it. Throughout this painful and difficult trial, the family acknowledged that (Terri) was in a diagnosed persistent vegetative state."

== 2004 ==
- Spring 2004: Jodi Centonze gives birth to her second child with Michael.
- May 19: Florida Judge W. Douglas Baird overturns "Terri's Law". The ruling is appealed.
- September 23: Florida Supreme Court agrees that "Terri's Law" is unconstitutional.

== 2005 ==
- January 24: The U.S. Supreme Court refuses to hear the case.
- February 25: Judge George Greer orders Terri's feeding tube removed on March 18.
- March 11: Media tycoon Robert Herring offers one million dollars to Michael Schiavo if he agrees to waive his guardianship over Terri to her parents. Michael declines.
- March 17: Members of the Florida Legislature consider a bill that would make removing food and water from patients in a persistent vegetative state illegal without a living will. Although the bill is passed by the Florida House of Representatives by a vote of 78 to 37, the Florida Senate defeats a similar measure hours later, 21 to 18.
- March 17: U.S. Senators Bill Frist and Michael Enzi announce that Terri Schiavo would be called to testify before the U.S. Senate Committee on Health, Education, Labor, and Pensions on March 28 in Washington. No one expects Terri to testify, but the move extends witness protection to Terri, requiring reinsertion of her feeding tube.
- March 18: Greer strikes down the subpoena as unconstitutional and Terri's feeding tube is removed for the third and final time.
- March 20/21: U.S. Congress approves emergency legislation, the Palm Sunday Compromise.
- March 21: Bob and Mary Schindler file a request for an emergency injunction with the U.S. District Court for the Middle District of Florida in Tampa.
- March 22: Judge James D. Whittemore refuses to order the feeding tube reinserted.
- March 22: Three Florida neurologists view 12 of Terri's CT scans. Dr. Leon Prockop says it was the "most severe brain damage I've seen." Dr. Walter Bradley says that he "doubts there's any activity going on in the higher levels of her brain." Dr. Michael T. Pulley says, "The chance that this person is going to recover is about zero."
- March 23: The Florida Senate again debates this proposed law, which is again rejected, 21 to 18.

The 11th Circuit Court of Appeals in Atlanta denies the request to reinsert the feeding tube. The three-judge panel rules 2-1.

- March 23: Bob and Mary Schindler appeal again to the U.S. Supreme Court.
- March 24: The U.S. Supreme Court declines to grant certiorari. Judge Greer issues an injunction denying the Florida State government's right to have the Florida Department of Children & Families take over Schiavo's care.
- March 27: Terri is given the Anointing of the Sick ("Last Rites").
- March 30: The 11th Circuit Court of Appeals in Atlanta agrees to consider a petition by Schiavo's parents to have a new hearing to decide whether the feeding tube should be reinserted. Later that day, the court denies the petition.
- March 31: Terri Schiavo dies at 9:03 AM EST.
- June 15: Autopsy results released.
- June 20: Terri Schiavo is cremated.
