= Rudy Linares case =

Incident in the right to die movement (1989)

Rodolfo "Rudy" Linares Sr. was an American house painter who in April 1989 held nurses at bay at gunpoint at Rush-Presbyterian-St. Luke's Medical Center and disconnected the respirator keeping his comatose infant alive.

== Cause and the incident ==
In August 1988, Rudy's 6-month-old son Samuel had accidentally swallowed a balloon at a birthday party, damaging his brain. Despite Rudy's attempt to resuscitate him and then carrying him to a fire station, Samuel came to be in a persistent vegetative state, and was only kept alive via a respirator. After eight months the family had requested that Samuel be allowed to die. The doctors agreed, but the hospital's lawyer advised against it due to potential criminal charges.

Linares entered the hospital on April 26 with a .357 Magnum revolver and proceeded to the bed where Samuel lay. Holding the medical staff at bay he disconnected the respirator and cradled the infant in his arms for approximately 20 minutes until a nearby doctor confirmed Samuel had died at the age of 15 months. Rudy then handed himself over to police.

== Trial ==
The Cook County state attorney's office referred the case to a grand jury. Under a deal made with the prosecutors, Rudy pleaded guilty to a weapons charge misdemeanor and one year of probation. The grand jury declined to indict on the murder charges. Circuit Judge Robert Bastone noted to Linares, "as far as punishment is concerned, I think you have suffered enough." The Guardian compared the case to In re Quinlan, as it set a similar precedent of a guardian withdrawing consent for treatment.

== Right to die debate ==
Goldman, a doctor residing over Samuel at the time, stated: "There was no ethical difference of opinion here. The physicians agreed that the child was in an irreversible coma and would not recover. There was no medical opposition to removing the ventilator. What we faced was a legal obstacle."

Philosopher Peter Singer discussed the Linares case in his 1994 book Rethinking Life and Death as a real world example in the Right to Die debate. Singer argued that while Rudy acted against the law and prevailing moral ethic, he did so to cease human suffering of not just Samuel but the wider Linares family.

== See also ==
- Terri Schiavo case
- Haleigh Poutre
- Vincent Lambert case
- Letting die
