= Barry Cohen (attorney) =

American lawyer

- Born: August 3, 1939
- Died: September 22, 2018 (aged 79); Tampa, Florida, U.S.
- Education: Florida State University; Mercer University Walter F. George School of Law
- Occupation: Attorney

Barry Cohen (August 3, 1939 – September 22, 2018) was an American criminal defense, personal injury, civil and qui tam attorney in Florida's Tampa Bay Area. Cohen was hired by the Council on American–Islamic Relations (CAIR) to represent the family of Ibragim Todashev, an unarmed Chechen shot to death while being questioned by the FBI in relation to the Boston Marathon bombing. He was known for his aggressive legal tactics. He died of leukemia in 2018.

== Legal methods ==
Cohen was quoted as saying that "defenders have to try to balance an inherent media advantage enjoyed by prosecutors." His history of winning cases and the large legal fees he commanded put Cohen in the position of being able to choose the cases he wants to handle, including accepting clients that cannot afford his fees.

== Notable cases ==
William A. LaTorre, a Clearwater, Florida, chiropractor at the wheel of his 35-foot (11 m) cigarette boat on Memorial Day weekend in 1989, collided with a 17-foot (5 m) boat full of teenagers. Four teenagers were killed and several more injured. LaTorre was charged with four counts of vessel homicide. Cohen painted a picture in the media as an unavoidable tragic event for everyone concerned. He portrayed LaTorre's arrest as politically motivated, and managed press conferences with LaTorre's tearful wife. LaTorre was eventually acquitted of all four deaths.

In 1992, former Chief Judge Dennis Alverez of Hillsborough County hired Cohen to represent him in an FBI inquiry into his handling of a legal dispute over the disposition of former Tampa Bay Buccaneers owner Hugh Culverhouse's multimillion-dollar estate.

In 1994, Cohen represented Sheriff Everett Rice and the Pinellas County Sheriff's Office when it was threatened with a lawsuit by former U.S. Attorney Robert Merkle for damages stemming from a false arrest charge after Merkle was acquitted of battery in a traffic confrontation. The Pinellas County Commission voted to hire Cohen as a special counsel at Rice's request.

In 2005, Barry Cohen represented Pinellas County Judge George Greer when Greer was threatened with impeachment for his rulings in the Terri Schiavo case.

Jennifer Porter hired Cohen before she announced she was the driver of the Toyota Echo involved in a hit and run accident that killed two children and put two in the hospital in March 2004. When she drove away after the collision with the four siblings, she retained Cohen before she stepped forward in a press conference along with press releases. She was charged with leaving the scene of an accident. She eventually pleaded guilty to a felony, but did not receive a prison sentence. Her sentence was reduced to two years house arrest through a judge's ruling engineered by Cohen.

After she had completed all but six months of her sentence, Porter requested that her teaching certificate be restored. Cohen said her excellent character references plus the expert testimony provided through Cohen's efforts, explaining how she suffered psychological trauma, testimony that convinced the judge to give her house arrest, should also persuade the state panel to let Porter maintain her teaching certification.

In September 2007, Cohen was hired to represent Nick Bollea, son of professional wrestler Hulk Hogan. Bollea, age 17, was driving a yellow Toyota Supra at high speed when he lost control, according to police. His passenger was severely injured. "A lawyer can drop a client, just as a client can drop an attorney", Cohen is reported to have said, making a general statement when announcing his withdrawal from the case.

== Aisenberg case ==
In 1997, Steven and Marlene Aisenberg hired Cohen after their five-month-old baby, Sabrina Aisenberg, disappeared from her crib in the Aisenberg home, near Valrico, Florida. Baby Sabrina was never found and the reason for her disappearance remains a mystery. From the beginning the parents were the only suspects the prosecution investigators pursued. Cohen, as the Aisenbergs' attorney, appeared with the couple on Larry King Live in 2001 along with several other guests to discuss the still unsolved case.

Cohen said the police have a right to investigate the parents of a missing child, but it was law enforcement's continued and relentless focus solely on the parents to the exclusion of other possibilities and leads that was problematic and abusive in this case. For example, prosecution investigators received an illegally obtained warrant to record over 255 private conversations in the Aisenberg home. The tapes were inaudible for the most part and none provided any evidence to prosecute the Aisenbergs. The tapes were transcribed as best they could be into transcripts for the judge and for presentation to a grand jury.

=== Hyde Amendment fees ===
Eventually in 2007, the charges against the Aisenbergs were dropped for lack of evidence. In U.S. v. Aisenberg, Cohen sued the federal government for malicious prosecution on behalf of the Aisenbergs for reimbursement of legal fees under the Hyde Amendment, a federal statute enacted in 1997 to pay the legal fees of defendants who were victims of prosecutorial abuse. On February 1, 2003, the Aisenbergs were awarded $2.9 million to pay the legal fees for the then five-year-old case, the largest award in the ten years since the Hyde Amendment was enacted. In fact, very rarely is suing for reimbursement of legal fees under the Hyde Amendment successful. As of 2007, the award remains the largest to date. Although Cohen did not receive the $7 million requested in the suit, the amount awarded was far more than the $250,000 the prosecution was originally willing to pay.

Judge Merryday of the Middle District of Florida reviewed the case and explained why he ordered the federal government to pay the $2.9 million in legal fees and expenses under the Hyde Amendment. The judge called the prosecution's case "vexatious, frivolous, or in bad faith". The judge's decision is highly critical of the prosecutor's tactics. The judge ordered the government to release to the public the grand jury transcripts as “the public is entitled to know” about the “misdirected and overzealous prosecutorial exertions” in this case.

The controversy surrounding the Aisenberg case has been covered on numerous media outlets, including the CBS program 48 Hours as well as The Oprah Winfrey Show, Dateline NBC, Good Morning America, and the Today Show.

== Community activism ==
On May 15, 2008, Cohen underwrote a special screening of The Great Debaters for 250 underprivileged Tampa children, along with special guests Doug Williams (the first African-American quarterback to win the Super Bowl) and actress Jurnee Smollett, who won the 2008 NAACP Image Award for her performance as the female lead in the film.
