= Terri Schiavo case =

American right-to-die legal case

Terri Schiavo
- Schiavo with her mother in 2001
- Born: Theresa Marie Schindler; December 3, 1963; Lower Moreland Township, Pennsylvania, U.S.
- Died: March 31, 2005 (aged 41); Pinellas Park, Florida, U.S.
- Spouse: Michael Schiavo (m. 1984)

The Terri Schiavo case was a series of court and legislative actions in the United States from 1998 to 2005, regarding the care of Theresa Marie Schiavo (/ˈʃaɪvoʊ/; née Schindler; December 3, 1963 – March 31, 2005), a woman in an irreversible permanent vegetative state. Schiavo's husband and legal guardian argued that Schiavo would not have wanted prolonged artificial life support without the prospect of recovery, and, in 1998, he elected to remove her feeding tube. Schiavo's parents disputed her husband's assertions and challenged Schiavo's medical diagnosis, arguing in favor of continuing artificial nutrition and hydration. The highly publicized and prolonged series of legal challenges presented by her parents, which ultimately involved state and federal politicians up to the level of George W. Bush (the then U.S. president), caused a seven-year delay (until 2005) before Schiavo's feeding tube was ultimately removed.

On February 25, 1990, at age 26, Schiavo went into cardiac arrest at her home in St. Petersburg, Florida. She was resuscitated, but had severe brain damage due to oxygen deprivation and was left comatose. After two and a half months without improvement, her diagnosis was changed to that of a persistent vegetative state. For the next two years, doctors attempted occupational therapy, speech therapy, physical therapy and other experimental therapy, hoping to restore her to a state of awareness, without success. In 1998, Schiavo's husband Michael Schiavo petitioned the Sixth Circuit Court of Florida to remove her feeding tube pursuant to Florida law. He was opposed by Terri's parents, Robert and Mary Schindler. The court determined that Schiavo would not have wished to continue life-prolonging measures, and on April 24, 2001, her feeding tube was removed for the first time, only to be reinserted several days later. On February 25, 2005, a Pinellas County judge again ordered the removal of Terri Schiavo's feeding tube. Several appeals and federal government intervention followed, which included Bush returning to Washington, D.C., to sign legislation moving the case to the federal courts. After appeals through the federal court system that upheld the original decision to remove the feeding tube, staff at the Pinellas Park hospice facility disconnected the feeding tube on March 18, 2005, and Schiavo died on March 31, 2005 with her mother at her side. Michael Schiavo remarried months later.

The Schiavo case involved 14 appeals and numerous legal motions, petitions, and hearings in the Florida courts; five suits in federal district court; extensive political intervention at the levels of the Florida state legislature, Governor Jeb Bush, the U.S. Congress, and President George W. Bush; and four denials of certiorari from the Supreme Court of the United States. The case also spurred highly visible activism from the United States pro-life movement, the right-to-die movement, and disability rights groups. Since Schiavo's death, both her husband and her family have written books on their sides of the case, and both have also been involved in activism over related issues.

== Background ==
=== Early life ===
Terri Schiavo was born Theresa Marie Schindler to Mary (born 1941) and Robert Schindler (1937–2009) on December 3, 1963, in Lower Moreland Township, Montgomery County, Pennsylvania, a suburb of Philadelphia. She was the oldest of three children. Her mother reported that, as a child, Schiavo would spend hours in her bedroom arranging her collection of stuffed animals. As a teen, she enjoyed listening to John Denver and reading Danielle Steel romances. She attended Bucks County Community College, where she met Michael Schiavo in 1982. The two began dating and married on November 10, 1984. They moved to Florida in 1986, following her parents. Michael worked as a restaurant manager, while Terri took up a bookkeeping job with an insurance company. She had naturally dark hair, but dyed it blonde.

=== Initial medical crisis: 1990 ===
In the early morning of February 25, 1990, Schiavo collapsed in a hallway of her St. Petersburg, Florida apartment. Firefighters and paramedics, arriving in response to her husband Michael's 9-1-1 call, found her face-down and unconscious. She was not breathing and had no pulse. They attempted to resuscitate her and she was transported to the Humana Northside Hospital. Paramedics had her intubated and ventilated.

==== Initial medical assessments ====
The cause of Schiavo's collapse was determined to be cardiac arrest. Her medical chart contained a note that "she apparently has been trying to keep her weight down with dieting by herself, drinking liquids most of the time during the day and drinking about 10–15 glasses of iced tea." Upon admission to the hospital, she was noted as suffering from hypokalemia (low potassium levels): her serum potassium level was an abnormally low 2.0 mEq/L (the normal range for adults being 3.5–5.0 mEq/L). Her sodium and calcium levels were normal. Electrolyte imbalance is often caused by drinking excessive fluids, and a serious consequence of hypokalemia can be heart rhythm abnormalities, including sudden arrhythmia death syndrome. Schiavo was eventually switched from being fed by a nasogastric feeding tube to a percutaneous endoscopic gastrostomy (PEG) feeding tube. Garcia J. DeSousa, a board-certified neurologist in St. Petersburg, Florida, who had previously treated Schiavo, cared for her during her initial admission to Humana Northside; both he and Victor Gambone, an internist and Schiavo family physician, independently made the diagnosis of persistent vegetative state within approximately one year after her sudden cardiac arrest.

=== Relationship between Terri's husband and parents ===
From 1990 to 1993, Michael Schiavo and the Schindlers (Terri Schiavo's parents) enjoyed an amicable relationship, with the Schindlers allowing Michael to live rent-free in their condominium for several months.

=== Rehabilitation efforts: 1990–1993 ===
In November 1990, Michael Schiavo took Terri to the University of California, San Francisco, for experimental nerve stimulation with a thalamic stimulator. The treatment took several months and was unsuccessful. He returned to Florida with her in January 1991 and admitted her as an inpatient to the Mediplex Rehabilitation Center in Bradenton, Florida. On July 19, 1991, Schiavo was transferred to the Sabal Palms Skilled Care Facility, where she received neurological testing and regular speech and occupational therapy until 1994. In mid-1993, Michael Schiavo requested a do not resuscitate order for her after she contracted a urinary tract infection.

== Legal cases (1992–2005) ==
=== Malpractice ===
In 1992, Michael filed a malpractice suit against Terri's gynecologist on the basis that he failed to diagnose bulimia as the cause of her infertility. Terri had gone to the doctor because she had stopped menstruating but the doctor had failed to take her medical history into account which might have revealed an eating disorder. During the case, one of Terri's friends testified that she knew Schiavo was bulimic. In November 1992, Michael won the case and was awarded $6.8 million by the jury, later reduced to $2 million as Terri was found partly at fault for her condition. After attorneys' fees and other expenses, Michael received $300,000 and $750,000 was put in a trust fund for Terri's medical care. According to Michael, in early 1993 the Schindlers demanded that he share the malpractice money with them.

=== Petition to remove feeding tube ===
On June 18, 1990, the court appointed Michael Schiavo as Terri Schiavo's legal guardian; this appointment was not disputed by the Schindlers at the time. In May 1998, Michael Schiavo filed a petition to remove Terri Schiavo's feeding tube, which her parents opposed. Richard Pearse was appointed by the court as a second guardian ad litem (GAL), and on December 29, 1998, reported "Dr. Jeffrey Karp's opinion of the ward's condition and prognosis is substantially shared among those physicians who have recently been involved in her treatment." Pearse concluded from Karp's and Vincent Gambone's diagnosis of Persistent Vegetative State that Schiavo was legally in a persistent vegetative state as defined by Florida Statutes, Title XLIV, Chapter 765, §101(12). This includes the "absence of voluntary action" and an "inability to communicate or interact purposefully".

Pearse found that there was no possibility of improvement but that Michael Schiavo's decisions might have been influenced by the potential to inherit what remained of Terri Schiavo's estate as long as he remained married to her. Due to a lack of a living will and questions regarding Michael's credibility, Pearse recommended denying his petition to remove her feeding tube. Pearse reported that the issue of conflict of interest applied to the Schindlers as well, since, had Michael divorced Terri as they wanted him to, they would have inherited the remainder of Terri Schiavo's estate upon her death.

=== Schiavo end-of-life wishes ===
Given the lack of a living will, a trial was held before Pinellas County Judge George Greer during the week of January 24, 2000, to determine what Schiavo's wishes would have been regarding life-prolonging procedures. Michael Schiavo was represented by attorney George Felos, who had won a landmark right-to-die case before the Florida Supreme Court in 1990.

The trial included testimony from 18 witnesses regarding her medical condition and her end-of-life wishes. Michael Schiavo claimed that his wife would not want to be kept on a machine where her chance for recovery was minuscule. Judge Greer issued his order granting the petition for authorization to discontinue artificial life support for Terri Schiavo in February 2000. In this decision, the court found that Terri Schiavo was in a persistent vegetative state and that she had made reliable oral declarations that she would have wanted the feeding tube removed. This decision was upheld by the Florida Second District Court of Appeal (2nd DCA) and came to be known by the court as Schiavo I in later rulings.

=== Oral feeding and the second guardianship challenge ===
In March 2000, the Schindlers filed a motion to permit assisted feeding of Terri, which is not considered a life-prolonging procedure under Florida law. Since clinical records indicated that Terri Schiavo was not responsive to swallowing tests and required a feeding tube, Judge Greer ruled that she was not capable of orally ingesting sufficient nutrition and hydration to sustain life, and denied the request. The Medical Examiner in his postmortem report was more definitive and reaffirmed that Schiavo could not have swallowed.

In 2000, the Schindlers again challenged Michael Schiavo's guardianship. The Schindlers suggested that he was wasting the assets within the guardianship account by transferring Terri Schiavo to a Pinellas Park, Florida, hospice "after it was clear that she was not 'terminal' within Medicare guidelines" for hospices. By this time, while still legally married to Terri Schiavo, Michael Schiavo was in a relationship with Jodi Centonze, and had fathered their first child. He said he chose not to divorce his wife and relinquish guardianship because he wanted to ensure her final wishes (not to be kept alive in a PVS) were carried out. The court denied the motion to remove the guardian, allowing that the evidence was not sufficient and, in some instances, not relevant. It set April 24, 2001, as the date on which the tube was to be removed.

=== Schiavo II ===
In April 2001, the Schindlers filed a motion for relief from judgment citing new evidence of Terri Schiavo's wishes. Judge Greer denied the motion as untimely under Rule 1.540(b)(5) of the Florida Rules of Civil Procedure. The Second District Court of Appeal upheld Greer's decision but remanded the issue in order to give the Schindlers an opportunity to file a new motion. On April 24, 2001, Terri's feeding tube was removed for the first time. The Schindlers filed a civil suit against Michael Schiavo alleging perjury, which was assigned to another court. The judge, Frank Quesada, issued an injunction against the removal of feeding tube until this was settled. The feeding tube was reinserted on April 26, 2001. On appeal by Michael Schiavo, the Second District Court of Appeal reversed Judge Quesada's order. In the same time frame, Michael Schiavo filed a motion to enforce the mandate of the guardianship court (that the feeding tube be removed). The Second District Court of Appeal denied the motion. These three decisions, all published in a single order by Florida's Second District Court of Appeal, came to be known by the court as Schiavo II in its later rulings.

=== Schiavo III and IV: PVS diagnosis challenge ===
Left: CT scan of normal brain; Right: Schiavo's 2002 CT scan provided by Ronald Cranford, showing loss of brain tissue. The black area is liquid, indicating hydrocephalus ex vacuo. The small white piece in the right image is the thalamic stimulator implanted in her brain.

On August 10, 2001, on remand from the Florida Second District Court of Appeal, Judge Greer heard a motion from the Schindlers claiming that new medical treatment could restore sufficient cognitive ability such that Terri Schiavo herself would be able to decide to continue life-prolonging measures. The court also heard motions from the Schindlers to remove the guardian (Michael Schiavo) and to require Judge Greer to recuse himself. Judge Greer denied the motions and the Schindlers appealed to the Second District Court of Appeals. On October 17, 2001, the Court of Appeal affirmed the denials of the motions to remove and recuse. The Court of Appeals acknowledged that their opinion misled the trial court, and they remanded the question of Terri Schiavo's wishes back to the trial court and required an evidentiary hearing to be held. The court specified that five board certified neurologists were to testify. The Schindlers were allowed to choose two doctors to present findings at an evidentiary hearing while Schiavo could introduce two rebuttal experts. Finally, the trial court itself would appoint a new independent physician to examine and evaluate Terri Schiavo's condition. These decisions, all published in a single order by the Florida Second District Court of Appeal, came to be known by the court as Schiavo III in its later rulings. In October 2002, on remand by the Second District Court of Appeal, an evidentiary hearing was held in Judge Greer's court to determine whether new therapy treatments could help Terri Schiavo restore any cognitive function. In preparation for the trial, a new computed axial tomography scan (CAT scan) was performed, which showed severe cerebral atrophy. An EEG showed no measurable brain activity. The five physicians chosen were William Maxfield, a radiologist, and four neurologists: William Hammesfahr, Ronald Cranford, Melvin Greer and Peter Bambakidis.

The five doctors examined Terri Schiavo's medical records, brain scans, the videos, and Terri herself. Cranford, Greer, and Bambakidis testified that Terri Schiavo was in a persistent vegetative state (PVS). Maxfield and Hammesfahr testified that she was in a minimally conscious state. As part of the court-ordered medical exam, six hours of video of Terri Schiavo were taped and filed at the Pinellas County courthouse. The tape included Terri Schiavo with her mother and neurologist William Hammesfahr. The entire tape was viewed by Judge Greer, who wrote, Terri "clearly does not consistently respond to her mother". From that six hours of video, the Schindlers and their supporters produced six video clips intended to support their case, totaling less than six minutes, and released those clips to public websites. Judge Greer ruled that Terri Schiavo was in a PVS, and was beyond hope of significant improvement. The trial court order was particularly critical of Hammesfahr's testimony, which claimed positive results in similar cases by use of vasodilation therapy, the success of which is unsupported in the medical literature. This ruling was later affirmed by Florida's Second District Court of Appeal, which stated that "this court has closely examined all of the evidence in the record", and "we have ... carefully observed the video tapes in their entirety." The court concluded that "if we were called upon to review the guardianship court's decision de novo, we would still affirm it." This decision by the Second District Court of Appeals came to be known as Schiavo IV in later rulings.

Around the start of 2003, the Schindlers began to create more publicity by lobbying for their case to keep their daughter alive. On September 11, 2003, the Schindlers petitioned the court to forestall removal of the feeding tube in order to provide for "eight weeks' therapy". Accompanying the petition were four affidavits from members of the Schindler family and one from Dr. Alexander T. Gimon. At the hearing, the Schindlers' counsel read into the record additional affidavits from three speech professionals and two nurses. In particular, nurse Carla Sauer Iyer asserted that she was able to feed Terri Schiavo orally but that Michael characterized any such interaction as "therapy" and ordered her not to do so. Iyer claimed in her affidavit that her initial training in 1996 consisted solely of the instruction, "Do what Michael Schiavo tells you or you're terminated", and that standing orders were not to contact the Schindler family, but that she "would call them anyway".

On September 17, 2003, Judge George Greer denied the petition, and wrote that "the Petition is an attempt by Mr. and Mrs. Schindler to re-litigate the entire case. It is not even a veiled or disguised attempt. The exhibits relied upon by them, clearly demonstrate this to be true." Regarding Iyer's statements, Greer wrote that they were "incredible to say the least" and that "Ms. Iyer details what amounts to a 15-month cover-up from April 1995 through July 1996, which include the staff of Palm Garden of Largo Convalescent Center, the Guardian of the Person, the guardian ad litem, the medical professionals, the police and, believe it or not, Mr. and Mrs. Schindler ... It is impossible to believe that Mr. and Mrs. Schindler would not have subpoenaed Ms. Iyer for the January 2000 evidentiary hearing had Iyer contacted them in 1996 as her affidavit alleges."

== Terri's Law and other government delays ==
On October 15, 2003, Schiavo's feeding tube was removed. Within a week, when the Schindlers' final appeal was exhausted, State Rep. Frank Attkisson and the Florida Legislature passed "Terri's Law" in an emergency session giving Governor Jeb Bush the authority to intervene in the case. Governor Bush immediately ordered the feeding tube be reinserted. Governor Bush sent the Florida Department of Law Enforcement (FDLE) to remove Schiavo from the hospice. She was taken to Morton Plant Rehabilitation Hospital in Clearwater, where her feeding tube was surgically reinserted. She was then returned to the hospice. Part of the legislation required the appointment of a guardian ad litem (GAL), Jay Wolfson, to "deduce and represent the best wishes and best interests" of Schiavo, and report them to Governor Bush. Wolfson's report did not change Michael's role as her legal guardian and did not otherwise obstruct him legally.

Michael Schiavo opposed the Governor's intervention in Schiavo's case, and was represented, in part, by the American Civil Liberties Union (ACLU). At the same time, Robert and Mary Schindler, her parents, attempted to intervene and participate in the "Terri's Law" case but were denied by Judge W. Douglas Baird, a Circuit Judge in the Florida Sixth Circuit. They appealed, and, on February 13, 2004, the Florida Second District Court of Appeal (Second District Court of Appeals) ordered Baird to hold further hearings on the issue. On March 17, 2004, Baird denied the Schindlers the right to intervene a second time. The Schindlers, represented by the American Center for Law and Justice (ACLJ), appealed the right to participate in the "Terri's Law" case, with the court scheduling an oral argument date for June 14. The Schindlers' other attorney, Pat Anderson, was concurrently challenging Michael Schiavo's right to be her guardian, and, on June 16, 2004, she made a petition for writ of quo warranto.

On May 5, 2004, Baird found "Terri's Law" unconstitutional, and struck it down. Bush appealed this order to the Second District Court of Appeals, but on May 12, 2004, the court issued an "Order Relinquishing Case for Entry of Final Judgment and Order to Show Cause Why this Proceeding Should Not be Certified to the Supreme Court As Requiring Immediate Resolution". The Second District Court of Appeals, in sending it directly to the Florida Supreme Court, invoked "pass through" jurisdiction.

The Florida Supreme Court then overturned the law as unconstitutional.

== Final feeding tube removal and federal involvement ==
=== Early 2005 motions ===
On February 23, 2005, the Schindlers filed a motion for relief from judgment pending medical evaluations. The Schindlers wanted Schiavo to be tested with an fMRI and given a swallowing therapy called VitalStim. The motion was accompanied by 33 affidavits from doctors in several specialties, speech-language pathologists and therapists, and a few neuropsychologists, all urging that new tests be undertaken. Patricia Fields Anderson, the Schindler family attorney, still held out hope "that Terri might be able to take nourishment orally, despite past findings that she is incapable". Judge Greer formally denied the motion and ordered the "removal of nutrition and hydration from the ward" and set the time and date for the removal of the feeding tube as "1:00 p.m. on Friday, March 18, 2005".

On February 28, 2005, the Schindlers filed a motion, asking for permission to attempt to provide Schiavo with "Food and Water by Natural Means". This second motion asked for permission to "attempt to feed" Schiavo by mouth. Judge Greer denied the second motion on March 8, saying "it has become clear that the second motion is part and parcel of the previous motion on medical evaluations. The same declarations are being used for both motions and the motion appears to be an alternative pleading to the previous motion. Both are asking for an experimental procedure." The following day, Greer denied the first motion as well, citing that an affiant doctor for Michael cautioned that fMRI was an experimental procedure that should be conducted in an academic setting, because Schiavo had already undergone swallowing tests and failed, and because VitalStim had only been performed on patients who were not in a PVS. Greer noted that "most of the doctor affidavits submitted are based on their understanding of Schiavo's condition from news reports or video clips they have seen. Many are obviously not aware of the medical exams undertaken for the 2002 trial."

Following Greer's order on March 18, 2005, to remove the feeding tube, Republicans in the United States Congress subpoenaed both Michael and Terri Schiavo to testify at a congressional hearing. Greer told congressional attorneys, "I have had no cogent reason why the (congressional) committee should intervene." He also stated that last-minute action by Congress does not invalidate years of court rulings.

=== Palm Sunday Compromise ===
President George W. Bush and Congressional Republicans anticipated Greer's adverse ruling well before it was delivered and worked on a daily basis to find an alternative means of overturning the legal process by utilizing the authority of the United States Congress. On March 20, 2005, the Senate, by unanimous consent, passed their version of a relief bill; since the vote was taken by voice vote, there was no official tally of those voting in favor and those opposed. Soon after Senate approval, the House of Representatives passed an identical version of the bill S.686, which came to be called the "Palm Sunday Compromise" and transferred jurisdiction of the Schiavo case to the federal courts. The bill passed the House on March 21, 2005, at 12:41 a.m. (UTC−5). Bush flew to Washington, D.C. from his vacation in Texas in order to sign the bill into law at 1:11 a.m.

While the bill had been proposed by Republican Senators Rick Santorum and Mel Martínez, it also had the support of Democratic Senator Tom Harkin due to disability rights concerns in the Schiavo case. Harkin had worked with disability rights groups for years and co-authored the 1990 Americans with Disabilities Act. American disability rights groups traditionally tend to ally themselves with Democrats and the political left; however, in the Schiavo case, they joined pro-life organizations in opposing the removal of her feeding tube and supporting the Palm Sunday Compromise. According to Marilyn Golden, Harkin's support was necessary for passage of the bill, as any voice opposition by Democrats would have delayed it.

As in the state courts, all of the Schindlers' federal petitions and appeals were denied, and the U.S. Supreme Court declined to grant certiorari, effectively ending the Schindlers' judicial options. At the same time, the so-called Schiavo memo surfaced, causing a political firestorm. The memo was written by Brian Darling, the legal counsel to Florida Republican senator Mel Martínez. It suggested the Schiavo case offered "a great political issue" that would appeal to the party's base (core supporters) and could be used against Senator Bill Nelson, a Democrat from Florida, because he had refused to co-sponsor the bill. Nelson easily won re-election in 2006.

Republican majority leader and physician Bill Frist opposed the removal of her feeding tube and, in a speech delivered on the Senate floor, challenged the diagnosis of Schiavo's physicians of Schiavo being in a persistent vegetative state (PVS): "I question it based on a review of the video footage which I spent an hour or so looking at last night in my office." After her death, the autopsy showed signs of long-term and irreversible damage to her brain consistent with PVS. Frist defended his actions after the autopsy.

== Final local motions, death, autopsy, and burial ==
On March 24, 2005, Judge Greer denied a petition for intervention by the Florida Department of Children and Families (DCF) and signed an order forbidding the department from "taking possession of Theresa Marie Schiavo or removing her" from the hospice and directed "each and every and singular sheriff of the state of Florida" to enforce his order. The order was appealed to the Second District Court of Appeals the following day, which resulted in an automatic stay under state law. While the stay was in effect, Florida Department of Law Enforcement personnel prepared to take custody of Terri Schiavo and transfer her to a local hospital for reinsertion of the feeding tube. Once Greer was made aware of the stay, he ordered it lifted and all parties stood down. Governor Bush decided to obey the court order despite enormous pressure from the political right. If Bush (or the Florida Legislature) had ignored Greer's order by attempting to remove her from the hospice, a confrontation between the Pinellas Park Police Department and the FDLE agents could have ensued. In jest, one official said local police discussed "whether we had enough officers to hold off the National Guard."

Terri Schiavo died at a Pinellas Park hospice on March 31, 2005.

=== Autopsy ===
Schiavo's body was taken to the Office of the District 6 Medical Examiner for Pinellas and Pasco counties, based in Largo, Florida. The autopsy was conducted on April 1, 2005, and revealed extensive brain damage. The manner of death was certified as "undetermined." The autopsy was led by Chief Medical Examiner Jon R. Thogmartin. In addition to consultation with a neuropathologist (Stephen J. Nelson), Thogmartin also arranged for specialized cardiac and genetic examinations to be made. The official autopsy report was released on June 15, 2005. In addition to studying Terri Schiavo's remains, Thogmartin scoured court, medical and other records and interviewed her family members, doctors and other relevant parties. Examination of Schiavo's nervous system, by neuropathologist Stephen J. Nelson, revealed extensive injury. The brain itself weighed only 615 g (21.7 oz), only half the weight expected for a female of her age, height, and weight, due to the loss of a massive number of neurons. Microscopic examination revealed extensive damage to nearly all brain regions, including the cerebral cortex, the thalamus, the basal ganglia, the hippocampus, the cerebellum, and the midbrain. The neuropathologic changes in her brain were precisely of the type seen in patients who enter a PVS following cardiac arrest. Throughout the cerebral cortex, the large pyramidal neurons that comprise some 70% of cortical cells – critical to the functioning of the cortex – were completely lost. The pattern of damage to the cortex, with injury tending to worsen from the front of the cortex to the back, was also typical. There was marked damage to important relay circuits deep in the brain (the thalamus) – another common pathologic finding in cases of PVS. The damage was, in the words of Thogmartin, "irreversible, and no amount of therapy or treatment would have regenerated the massive loss of neurons."

The cardiac pathologist who studied Schiavo's heart found it and the coronary vessels to be healthy, which excludes the possibility that her initial collapse was the result of myocardial infarction, although there was a localized area of healed inflammation (opening the possibility of myocarditis). Thogmartin found that "there was no proof that Terri Schiavo ever had an eating disorder such as bulimia." Regarding the possibility of strangulation or domestic violence as a cause of Schiavo's initial collapse, the report states: "No trauma was noted on any of the numerous physical exams or radiographs performed on Mrs. Schiavo on the day of, in the days after, or in the months after her initial collapse. Indeed, within an hour of her initial hospital admission, radiographic examination of her cervical spine was negative. Specifically, external signs of strangulation including cutaneous or deep neck injury, facial/conjunctival petechiae, and other blunt trauma were not observed or recorded during her initial hospital admission. Autopsy examination of her neck structures 15 years after her initial collapse did not detect any signs of remote trauma, but, with such a delay, the exam was unlikely to show any residual neck findings."

Regarding the cause and manner of Schiavo's death, Thogmartin wrote, "Mrs. Schiavo suffered severe anoxic brain injury. The cause of which cannot be determined with reasonable medical certainty. The manner of death will therefore be certified as undetermined."

=== Burial ===
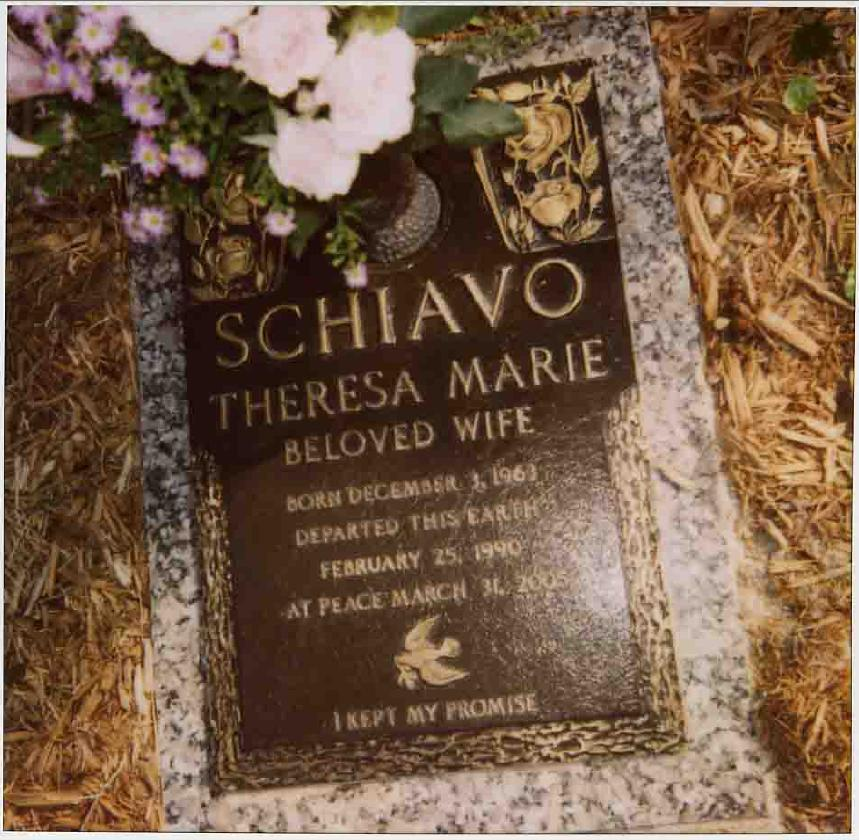
Schiavo's gravemarker

Schiavo's body was cremated. Her parents organized a memorial Mass for her at the Holy Name of Jesus Catholic Church in Gulfport on April 5, 2005. Father Frank Pavone, the founder of the Priests for Life anti-abortion organization, delivered the homily.

Michael Schiavo had his wife's cremated remains interred in Sylvan Abbey Memorial Park in Clearwater, Florida on June 20, 2005. The Schindlers' attorney stated that the family was notified by fax only after the memorial service; by then, the family had already started getting calls from reporters.

The epitaph (pictured) reads:

Schiavo / Theresa Marie / Beloved Wife
Born December 3, 1963
Departed this Earth / February 25, 1990
At peace March 31, 2005
[Dove with olive branch image]
I kept my promise

== Ethical and legal issues ==
=== Right to die ===
The Schiavo case has been compared to the Karen Ann Quinlan case and Nancy Cruzan case, two landmark right-to-die cases. Quinlan entered a persistent vegetative state in 1975, and her family was allowed to remove her from a ventilator in 1976 after a ruling by the New Jersey Supreme Court based on her right of privacy. She died of pneumonia in 1985. Cruzan was diagnosed with PVS in 1983 and her legal case reached the Supreme Court, which ruled that "clear and convincing evidence" of her wishes to die under such circumstances was needed. Cruzan's family did not have enough evidence of that, but later produced more. She died after being removed from life support in 1990.

The "Terri Schiavo case" actually refers to a series of cases. It differed from the Quinlan and Cruzan cases by involving settled law rather than breaking new legal ground on the right-to-die issue. In 2006, Professor Lois Shepherd, PhD JD, states it was "unclear" whether the Schiavo case represents a landmark decision. The Terri Schiavo affair involved a dispute between family members and her legal guardian over her wishes when there is no documented desire. According to medical ethicist Matthew Stonecipher, "The movement to challenge the decisions made for Terri Schiavo threatened to destabilize end-of-life law that had developed over the last quarter of the 20th century, principally through the cases of Karen Ann Quinlan and Nancy Cruzan." The outcome of the Schiavo case was also in part determined by a 1990 Florida case, Guardianship of Estelle Browning. In that case, attorney George Felos, representing a Browning relative, successfully argued that Browning's feeding tube should be removed before the Florida Supreme Court. The elderly Browning had expressed, in a living will, her wish not to be kept alive by any artificial means, including receiving food and water "by a gastric tube or intravenously." At that time, it was common to remove people from ventilators, but the law in Florida was not clear on removing them from feeding tubes. In a landmark ruling, the Florida Supreme Court decided that Browning had "the constitutional right to choose or refuse medical treatment, and that right extends to all relevant decisions concerning one's health."

=== Disability rights ===
During the years of legal proceedings, disability rights groups and activists closely monitored and involved themselves in the case. In March 2003, 12 disability rights groups, led by Not Dead Yet, along with four other amici filed an amicus curiae brief in which they opposed the removal of Schiavo's feeding tube. They also used the Schiavo case to advocate for federal review in cases where third parties decide to withdraw life support from patients unable to give consent. They argued that persistent vegetative state is frequently misdiagnosed, and that the reasons for withdrawal of life support from a patient should be scrutinized since even family member surrogates can have conflicts of interest. The Palm Sunday Compromise granted the federal review they sought, but it was limited to only the Schiavo case.

== Public opinion and activism ==
The seven-year case generated a great deal of public attention and activism. There was extensive media coverage and both sides courted public opinion. In 2000, the Schindlers created the Terri Schindler-Schiavo Foundation to garner support. During the weeks when Schiavo's feeding tube was removed in 2005, activists kept up an around-the-clock vigil outside her hospice. The protests were described as loud but non-violent. There were dozens of arrests, with most being for crossing a police line with water for Schiavo.

Two polls conducted shortly after Schiavo's feeding tube was removed for the final time in 2005 showed that a large majority of Americans believed that Michael Schiavo should have had the authority to make decisions on behalf of his wife and that the U.S. Congress overstepped its bounds with its intervention in the case.

== Developments since Schiavo's death ==
Since Terri Schiavo's death in March 2005, her family and Michael Schiavo have clashed a number of times. Each side has also worked to promote their own causes related to the case. In April 2005, the families disagreed over Schiavo's burial. The Schindlers had wanted her body to be buried in Florida, while Michael Schiavo said at the time that he would cremate her body and then have her ashes buried in her home state of Pennsylvania. In June 2005, however, Schiavo's ashes were buried in Florida instead. The words "I kept my promise" were included on the marker, referring to his promise to follow what he said was her wish not to be kept alive artificially. The statement angered the Schindlers.

In December 2005, Michael Schiavo created a political action committee, TerriPAC. It was formed to raise money to support right-to-die candidates and oppose candidates who had voted for government involvement in the Schiavo case. In 2007, TerriPAC paid a $1,350 fine to the Federal Election Commission for failing to file complete and timely records. Schiavo shut down the PAC later that year.

The Schindlers continued operation of the Terri Schindler Schiavo Foundation, with a new goal of helping individuals in situations similar to Terri's. In April 2010, Michael Schiavo charged that the Schindlers were improperly using Terri's name, as he held the rights to it, and that the family was using the foundation in order to make money. A Florida television station looked at the foundation's tax records and found that for 2008, it paid 64% of the $91,568 it raised in salaries to Terri's father, Robert Schindler Sr., her sister, Suzanne Vitadamo, and her brother, Robert Schindler Jr. Their attorney said the foundation does its work effectively and that the high percentage for salaries was due to the small amount of money the foundation raises. He also said that the Schindlers had the right to use Terri's name as she is a public figure. The foundation had been fined $1,000 shortly before Schiavo's death for failing to file timely paperwork. In September 2010, the Schindlers renamed the organization the "Terri Schiavo Life and Hope Network". (Page headers in the web publication show the name change occurred in 2010, compare volume 1 to 2 for 2010)

On January 21, 2006, Michael Schiavo married long-time fiancée Jodi Centonze, with whom he already had two children. Their wedding, which was attended by approximately 90 people, took place at a Catholic church in Safety Harbor, Florida, and was not made publicly known until the day before.

In 2006, both Michael Schiavo and the Schindlers released books telling their sides of the story. Schiavo's was called Terri: The Truth, while the Schindlers' was titled A Life that Matters: The Legacy of Terri Schiavo – A Lesson for Us All.

In 2008, then-presidential candidate Barack Obama expressed regret that he did not speak out against the Palm Sunday Compromise. In January 2015, Michael Schiavo told Politico that multiple politicians had personally visited him to apologize for their involvement in the case; he declined to identify any of these politicians, but stated that Jeb Bush was not among them.

Despite the extended emotion-laden legal struggle, the case broke no new legal ground: it remains settled law that the spouse is the next of kin in decisions where the patient is incompetent. However, it is now more generally recognized that the next of kin's decisions should be carried out in a timely fashion, even on matters of life and death. The case has raised public awareness of the value of having an advance medical directive.

On the tenth anniversary of Schiavo's death, several news sources offered retrospectives on the case, some still attempting to explain how this particular case became so notable.

=== Schiavo memo ===
During the Terri Schiavo case in March 2005, a talking points memo on the controversy was written by Brian Darling, the legal counsel to Republican Senator Mel Martínez of Florida. The memo suggested the Schiavo case offered "a great political issue" that would appeal to the party's base and could be used against Senator Bill Nelson, a Democrat from Florida who was up for reelection in 2006, because he had refused to co-sponsor the bill which came to be known as the Palm Sunday Compromise.

Martínez stated that he had not read the memo before he inadvertently passed it to Iowa Senator Tom Harkin, a Democratic supporter of the Palm Sunday Compromise legislation which gave federal courts jurisdiction to review the Terri Schiavo case.

After the existence of the memo was reported by ABC News and The Washington Post, Senate Majority Leader Bill Frist denounced the memo and asserted that the Republican Party's interest in the case was solely based on moral grounds. Darling remained silent about his authorship of the memo as commentators from the conservative magazine Weekly Standard and other publications questioned its authenticity. The source of the memo had not been disclosed by either ABC News or The Washington Post. The Washington Post says that it neither implied that the memo originated from a Republican source nor that it was circulated by Republicans, though it did in fact make these assertions when it published the story by reporters Mike Allen and Manuel Roig-Franzia on its wire service on March 19, 2005. The authorship claim was removed before publication of the print version on March 20, 2005. On April 6, 2005, Darling admitted to writing the memo, and resigned his position as legal counsel to Senator Martínez.

== See also ==
- Government involvement in the Terri Schiavo case
- Terri Schiavo timeline
- Nancy Cruzan
- Vincent Lambert case
- Jahi McMath case
- Haleigh Poutre
- Karen Ann Quinlan
