= Ellen Morgan =

Ellen Morgan may refer to:

- Ellen Morgan, fictional lead character in TV series Ellen, played by Ellen DeGeneres
- Ellen Morgan (born 1982 as Hilary Antonia Foretich), subject of a highly publicized child custody case leading to the Elizabeth Morgan Act
