= Ronald Cranford =

American physician

Ronald Eugene Cranford (1941 – May 31, 2006) was a neurologist and expert on comas and unconsciousness. He is best known for his work with families on public cases involving persons in a persistent vegetative state. He and three other doctors were responsible for introducing the "do not resuscitate" order. He worked with the families of such notable cases as the Karen Ann Quinlan case, Paul Brophy, Nancy Cruzan case and Terri Schiavo case.

== Early and education ==
Cranford was born in Peoria, Illinois. He earned a bachelor's degree in biology and his medical degree in 1965 from the University of Illinois College of Medicine in Chicago. He was a flight surgeon in the U.S. Air Force during the Vietnam War.

== Medical career ==
Cranford spent his career at Hennepin County Medical Center in Minneapolis, attaining the rank of Professor of Medicine in 1993. He held numerous posts with neurologic and ethics societies. In the mid-1970s, Dr. Cranford founded and chaired the Thanatology Committee at Hennepin County Medical Center, Minneapolis, Minnesota, to examine and improve end-of-life care. With Steven Miles, MD, Dr. Cranford and Alvin Shultz, MD, introduced the Do not resuscitate (DNR) order.

His testimony to the President's Commission for the Study of Ethical Problems in Medicine and Biomedical and Behavioral Research was incorporated in their seminal 1981 report, "Defining Death," and their 1983 report, "Deciding to Forego Life-Sustaining Treatment." Dr. Cranford published about 60 articles in the medical literature principally on states of unconsciousness and end-of-life care. In March 2006, his last letter in The Lancet condemned the force-feeding of prisoners at Guantanamo Bay, Cuba.
