= Vacco v. Quill =

- Supreme Court of the United States

Argued January 8, 1997 Decided June 26, 1997
- Full case name: Vacco, Attorney General of New York, et al. v. Quill et al.
- Citations: 521 U.S. 793 (more) 117 S. Ct. 2293; 138 L. Ed. 2d 834

Case history
- Prior: Quill v. Koppell, 870 F. Supp. 78 (S.D.N.Y. 1994); reversed, Quill v. Vacco, 80 F.3d 716 (2d Cir. 1996); cert. granted, 518 U.S. 1055 (1996).

Holding
- States have a legitimate interest in outlawing assisted suicide; "liberty" defined in the Fourteenth Amendment does not include the right to kill oneself or assistance in doing so.

Court membership
- Chief Justice William Rehnquist Associate Justices John P. Stevens · Sandra Day O'Connor; Antonin Scalia · Anthony Kennedy; David Souter · Clarence Thomas; Ruth Bader Ginsburg · Stephen Breyer

Case opinions
- Majority: Rehnquist, joined by O'Connor, Scalia, Kennedy, Thomas
- Concurrence: O'Connor, joined by Ginsburg, Breyer (in part)
- Concurrence: Stevens (in judgment)
- Concurrence: Souter (in judgment)
- Concurrence: Ginsburg (in judgment)
- Concurrence: Breyer (in judgment)

Laws applied
- U.S. Const. amend. XIV

Vacco v. Quill, 521 U.S. 793 (1997), is a landmark decision of the Supreme Court of the United States regarding the right to die. It ruled 9–0 that a ban in the State of New York ban on physician-assisted suicide was constitutional and that preventing doctors from assisting their patients, even those terminally ill and/or in great pain, was a legitimate state interest that was well within the authority of the state to regulate. In brief, this decision established that, as a matter of law, there was no constitutional guarantee of a "right to die."

== Background ==
The State of New York had enacted a prohibition against physician-assisted suicide by making it a crime for a physician to administer lethal medication or to otherwise knowingly and intentionally end the life of a patient, even a consenting, mentally competent, and terminally ill patient.

A number of physicians (here the respondents) filed suit against the New York Attorney General in the United States District Court for the Southern District of New York and challenged the law on constitutional grounds. The respondents argued that the statute violated the Equal Protection Clause of the Fourteenth Amendment and noted that a patient, while still enjoying the right to refuse treatment when terminally ill, did not enjoy the right to authorize a doctor to end their life. In effect, the respondents argued that refusing treatment and requesting that their doctor assist them in ending their life were "the same thing."

The District Court ruled in favor of the New York statute. In its decision, the court stated that the State of New York had a rational, legitimate interest in preserving life and protecting vulnerable persons; as such, the law was not unconstitutional. The court said that it was a matter of legislation and, if the ban were to be repealed, it would take an act of the New York Legislature (or a binding referendum by the voters) to do so.

The United States Court of Appeals for the Second Circuit reversed the District Court's judgment. The Appeals Court reasoned that even though the law itself applied as a general rule to all persons, a fact that the District Court noted in determining its constitutionality, it did not treat all competent patients equally when they were near death and wished to end their lives. To this effect, the Appeals Court stated that for example, a patient attached to a life support device was allowed to require its removal, but a person under identical circumstances could not demand that a doctor administer drugs to ensure the patient's death. It agreed with the contention that removing life support devices was identical to requesting physician-assisted euthanasia, and thereby reversed the lower court's finding.

The Supreme Court of the United States granted certiorari, hearing arguments on January 8, 1997.

== Supreme Court decision ==
On June 26, 1997, the Supreme Court issued six different opinions in a unanimous (9–0) decision. The majority opinion was authored by Chief Justice Rehnquist, and was joined by Justices O'Connor, Scalia, Kennedy, and Thomas. Justice O'Connor wrote a concurring opinion, joined in part by Justices Ginsburg and Breyer. Justices Stevens, Souter, Ginsburg, and Breyer filed separate concurring opinions.

The Court began its opinion by stating that the New York law did not infringe upon a fundamental right. In that line of reasoning, the Court referenced San Antonio School District v. Rodriguez, 411 U.S. 1 (1973), which stated in the relevant part that the judiciary must look to the US Constitution, rather than to the stated "importance" of a right, to determine whether that right was indeed fundamental. Because New York's ban did not infringe upon a fundamental right, and respondents were not claiming that the "right to die" was fundamental, the Court reiterated its policy of according such laws a great deal of leeway. In the Court's own words, from Heller v. Doe, 509 U.S. 312 (1993), laws such as those enacted by New York were entitled to a "strong presumption of validity."

After addressing the matter of fundamental rights, the Court delineated the rationale behind its decision. It first turned to the long-standing legal tradition of looking to a person's intent as a way of distinguishing between two acts with identical physical consequences. For example, a person who accidentally kills a pedestrian while blinded by the sun might face punishment only for vehicular manslaughter, but a person who intentionally and purposefully kills another with his car could be punished for murder. While both acts give the same results, they are distinguished by the intent of the actors.

The Court applied the standard of intent to the matter at hand by finding that a doctor who withdraws life support at the request of his patient intends only to respect his patient's wishes. That, the Court stated, is a sharp contrast to the doctor who honors a patient's request to end their life, which necessarily requires more than an intent to respect their wishes since it requires the intent to kill the patient. A major difference, the Court determined, in the two scenarios is that the former may cause the patient to die from underlying causes, but the latter will cause the patient to die by the hands of the physician. To that effect, the Court quoted a House Judiciary Committee hearing that stated that a physician performing an assisted suicide "must, necessarily and indubitably, intend primarily that the patient be made dead." Furthermore, in another repudiation of the respondents' argument, the Court noted that a patient removing life support might not actually intend to die and that death without such a device may not be a certainty.

Looking to New York's intent behind the ban, the Court noted that the law plainly recognized the difference between "killing" and "letting die." It also recognized that the State of New York had, as a matter of policy, a compelling interest in forbidding assisted suicide but that allowing a patient to refuse life support was simply an act of protecting a common-law right. The right was not, contrary to the Court of Appeals' view, the "right to hasten death;" rather, the Court declared that it was the right to retain bodily integrity and to preserve individual autonomy. The prevention of "unwanted touching" was, the Court stated, a very legitimate right to protect.

In closing, the Court said that it fully rejected the respondents' argument that the statutory difference between assisted suicide and refusing lifesaving treatment was "arbitrary" and "irrational." It conceded that there were probably incidents in which both were likely to have the same result but also stated that such an argument was beside the point. The Court declared that New York "obviously" had a number of legitimate, compelling, and rational interests in enacting this ban. However, regardless of these reasons, it determined simply that the law permitted everyone to refuse treatment and prohibited everyone from assisting suicide; as such, the law did not run afoul of the Equal Protection Clause, and the state had the constitutional authority to put such a law into place.

=== O'Connor's concurrence ===
Justice O'Connor joined the Court's decision. She accepted the contention that there was neither a "right to commit suicide" nor a "right to die," as such. She did not, however, think that the Court needed to consider the conflict beyond rejecting the facial challenges to the statute. Justice O'Connor stated that in the context of the questions presented in this case, the Court did not need to address whether a patient had a constitutionally cognizable interest in controlling the circumstances of his or her imminent death." The statute, she claimed, was constitutional on its face because the state had interests, such as protecting those who are not truly competent or facing imminent death or whose decisions would not be genuinely voluntary, of such gravity as to validate its legislation in pursuit of those interests. She said there was no constitutional conflict in this case since a patient was free to seek pain-relieving medication from their doctor, even at risk of health, to alleviate suffering, which was a constitutionally acceptable alternative to permit in the absence of legalized assisted suicide. She went on to say that because everyone will face suffering of this kind to themselves or loved ones, she had faith in the democratic process to strike an appropriate balance. In short, the law was up to the people of New York to decide.

=== Stevens' concurrence ===
Justice Stevens joined the Court's decision. He stated, however, that he issued a separate opinion only to clarify his belief that there was the possibility of further debate on the constitutional limitations of a state's ability to punish assisted suicide. As the second-most senior Justice on the Court (after Chief Justice Rehnquist), it is likely that Stevens would have written the opinion himself had Rehnquist not elected to do so. That much is suggested by the length of Stevens' concurrence, which runs several pages (official format) longer than Rehnquist's opinion. It is possible that the Chief Justice was in part persuaded to exercise the ability by the fact that Stevens's concurrence offers a less concrete view of the state's ability to regulate euthanasia than the majority of the Justices seem to support.

Stevens noted that the Court construed the challenge to the statute as one of facial validity: that the respondents asserted that the law was invalid in all or most cases it might be applied. That type of challenge, he noted, is very difficult to argue successfully because the challenger must show that the prohibited action is constitutionally protected. Applied to this case, the Court required that it be demonstrated that the Fourteenth Amendment included a right to commit suicide and that the right included the right to receive assistance in doing so. Stevens agreed with the Court in rejecting this idea and believed that "liberty," as defined by the Due Process Clause, included no such right: "The value to others of a person's life is far too precious to allow the individual to claim a constitutional entitlement to complete autonomy in making a decision to end that life."

However, Stevens said that the debate did not necessarily end there. He noted that the Supreme Court had found capital punishment to be constitutionally permissible but had later also said that it could potentially be impermissibly cruel. As such, simply deciding that a certain statute outlawing assisted suicide was constitutional did not mean that every possible application would be likewise. He stated that he believed that a state had a compelling interest in preventing suicide prompted by depression or coercion buth the interest did not apply for people competent to make decisions unless coerced or abused into them.

Stevens also rejected the argument, raised by the petitioners, that permitting physician-assisted suicide would taint the perception of the doctor-patient relationship. In some cases, he argued, a doctor's refusal to hasten death could be perceived as an act contrary to the doctor's role of healer. In such cases, Stevens believed that the relationship would not be hindered by permitting the doctor to aid in the patient's demise.

To conclude his opinion, he stated once more that he agreed with the majority finding, and that the rationale in the decision was well founded. However, he drew a distinction between finding a law generally acceptable and finding it acceptable in all cases. While agreeing in principle, he noted that there could be some instances in which the law unjustly infringed upon a patient's personal liberty.

=== Souter's concurrence ===
Justice Souter issued a short clarifying concurrence, noting that he agreed with the ruling but also stressing that he felt the claims raised were significant enough to warrant further justification. He cited his own concurrence in Washington v. Glucksberg 521 U.S. 702 (1997), reiterating that he felt the distinction between the permitted refusal of treatment and the prohibited assisted suicide not to be an arbitrary one.

=== Breyer's concurrence ===
Justice Breyer issued a joint concurrence with this case and Washington v. Glucksberg. He stated that he agreed that the distinction the law made between the practices in question was justified and rational. However, he thought that the majority erred both by stating that the respondents asserted a "right to commit suicide with another's assistance" and by stating that the right to choose one's manner of death was not fundamental. He felt it would be more appropriate to consider a "right to die with dignity." Regardless of the semantics, his 's primary disagreement with the Court was his belief that it need not and should not have deemed whether such a right would be fundamental. He believed that there could be cases in the future with similar yet substantially different circumstances in which the Court mightr be forced to reconsider the terms used in this decision.

=== Ginsburg's concurrence ===
Justice Ginsburg also issued a joint concurrence with this case and Washington v. Glucksberg. She stated that her reasoning largely mirrored that used by Justice O'Connor.

== See also ==
- Right to die § United States
- List of United States Supreme Court cases, volume 521
- List of United States Supreme Court cases
- Lists of United States Supreme Court cases by volume
