= Cruzan v. Director, Missouri Department of Health =

Medical-legal court decision

- Supreme Court of the United States

Argued December 6, 1989 Decided June 25, 1990
- Full case name: Nancy Beth Cruzan, by her parents and co-guardians, Cruzan et ux. v. Director, Missouri Department of Health, et al.
- Citations: 497 U.S. 261 (more) 110 S. Ct. 2841; 111 L. Ed. 2d 224; 1990 U.S. LEXIS 3301; 58 U.S.L.W. 4916

Case history
- Prior: Certiorari to the Supreme Court of Missouri

Holding
- Missouri may, consistent with the Due Process Clause of the Fourteenth Amendment, require that an incompetent's wish to discontinue life support be proven by clear and convincing evidence before life-sustaining treatment may be withdrawn.

Court membership
- Chief Justice William Rehnquist Associate Justices William J. Brennan Jr. · Byron White; Thurgood Marshall · Harry Blackmun; John P. Stevens · Sandra Day O'Connor; Antonin Scalia · Anthony Kennedy

Case opinions
- Majority: Rehnquist, joined by White, O'Connor, Scalia, Kennedy
- Concurrence: O'Connor
- Concurrence: Scalia
- Dissent: Brennan, joined by Marshall, Blackmun
- Dissent: Stevens

Laws applied
- U.S. Const. amends. IX, XIV

Cruzan v. Director, Missouri Department of Health, 497 U.S. 261 (1990), is a landmark decision of the Supreme Court of the United States involving a young adult incompetent. The first "right to die" case ever heard by the Court, Cruzan was argued on December 6, 1989, and decided on June 25, 1990. In a 5–4 decision, the Court affirmed the earlier ruling of the Supreme Court of Missouri and ruled in favor of the State of Missouri, finding it was acceptable to require "clear and convincing evidence" of a patient's wishes for removal of life support. A significant outcome of the case was the creation of advance health directives.

== Background ==
On January 11, 1983, then-25-year-old Nancy Cruzan (born July 20, 1957) lost control of her car while driving at nighttime near Carthage, Missouri. She was thrown from the vehicle and landed face-down in a water-filled ditch. Paramedics found her with no vital signs but resuscitated her. After three weeks in a coma, she was diagnosed as being in a persistent vegetative state (PVS). Surgeons inserted a feeding tube for her long-term care.

In 1988, Cruzan's parents asked her doctors to remove her feeding tube. The hospital refused to do so without a court order, since removal of the tube would cause Cruzan's death. The Cruzans filed for and received a court order for the feeding tube to be removed. The trial court ruled that constitutionally there is a "fundamental natural right ... to refuse or direct the withholding or withdrawal of artificial life-prolonging procedures when the person has no more cognitive brain function ... and there is no hope of further recovery." The court ruled that Cruzan had effectively 'directed' the withdrawal of life support by telling a friend earlier that year that if she were sick or injured, "she would not wish to continue her life unless she could live at least halfway normally."

The state of Missouri and Cruzan's guardian ad litem, Walter E. Williams, both appealed this decision. In a 4–3 decision, the Supreme Court of Missouri reversed the trial court's decision. It ruled that no one may refuse treatment for another person, absent an adequate living will "or the clear and convincing, inherently reliable evidence absent here." The Cruzans appealed, and in 1989 the Supreme Court of the United States agreed to hear the case.

== Issues ==
The legal question was whether the State of Missouri had the right to require "clear and convincing evidence" for the Cruzans to remove their daughter from life support. Specifically, the Supreme Court considered whether Missouri was violating the Due Process Clause of the Fourteenth Amendment by refusing to remove Nancy's feeding tube. The Due Process Clause provides: "[N]or shall any State deprive any person of life, liberty, or property, without due process of law[.]"

The Cruzans' lawyer summarized the constitutional basis for his appeal thus:

The issue in this case... is whether a state can order a person to receive invasive medical treatment when that order is contrary to the wishes of the family, when it overrides all available evidence about the person's wishes from prior to the accident, when the decision to forego treatment is among acceptable medical alternatives and when the state gives no specific justification for that intrusion other than their general interest in life. We submit that the Fourteenth Amendment and the liberty guarantee there protects individuals, conscious or unconscious, from such invasion by the state, without any particularized interest for that invasion.

== Decision ==
Cruzan was the first "right to die" case the Supreme Court had ever heard, and it proved divisive for the Court.^{p. 27} In a 5–4 decision, the Court found in favor of the Missouri Department of Health and ruled that nothing in the Constitution prevents the state of Missouri from requiring "clear and convincing evidence" before terminating life-supporting treatment, upholding the ruling of the Missouri Supreme Court. Reflecting the controversiality of the "end of life" issue, five Justices wrote separate opinions about the case.

In a majority opinion by Chief Justice William Rehnquist, the Court ruled that competent individuals have the right to refuse medical treatment under the Due Process Clause. However, with incompetent individuals, the Court upheld the state of Missouri's higher standard for evidence of what the person would want if they were able to make their own decisions. This higher evidentiary standard was constitutional, the Court ruled, because family members might not always make decisions that the incompetent person would have agreed with, and those decisions might lead to actions (like withdrawing life support) that would be irreversible.

=== Right to die vs. suicide ===
In court cases, like the Karen Ann Quinlan case and the Elizabeth Bouvia cases, the courts had highlighted the differences between dying from refusing treatment, and dying from suicide. However, in his concurring opinion in Cruzan, Justice Scalia noted that this distinction could be "merely verbal" if death is sought "by starvation instead of a drug."

Justice Scalia argued that refusing medical treatment, if doing so would cause a patient's death, was equivalent to the right to commit suicide. The right to commit suicide, he added, was not a due process right protected in the Constitution. As legal scholar Susan Stefan writes: "[Justice Scalia] argued that states had the right to 'prevent, by force if necessary,' people from committing suicide, including refusing treatment when that refusal would cause the patient to die."^{p. 28}

Justice Scalia's opinion raised important questions about the legal differences between refusal of treatment, suicide, assisted suicide, physician-assisted suicide, and "letting die", and the state's responsibility in preventing these, which would prove crucial issues in right to die and right to life cases to come.^{pp. 31–33}

== Aftermath ==
=== The Cruzans ===
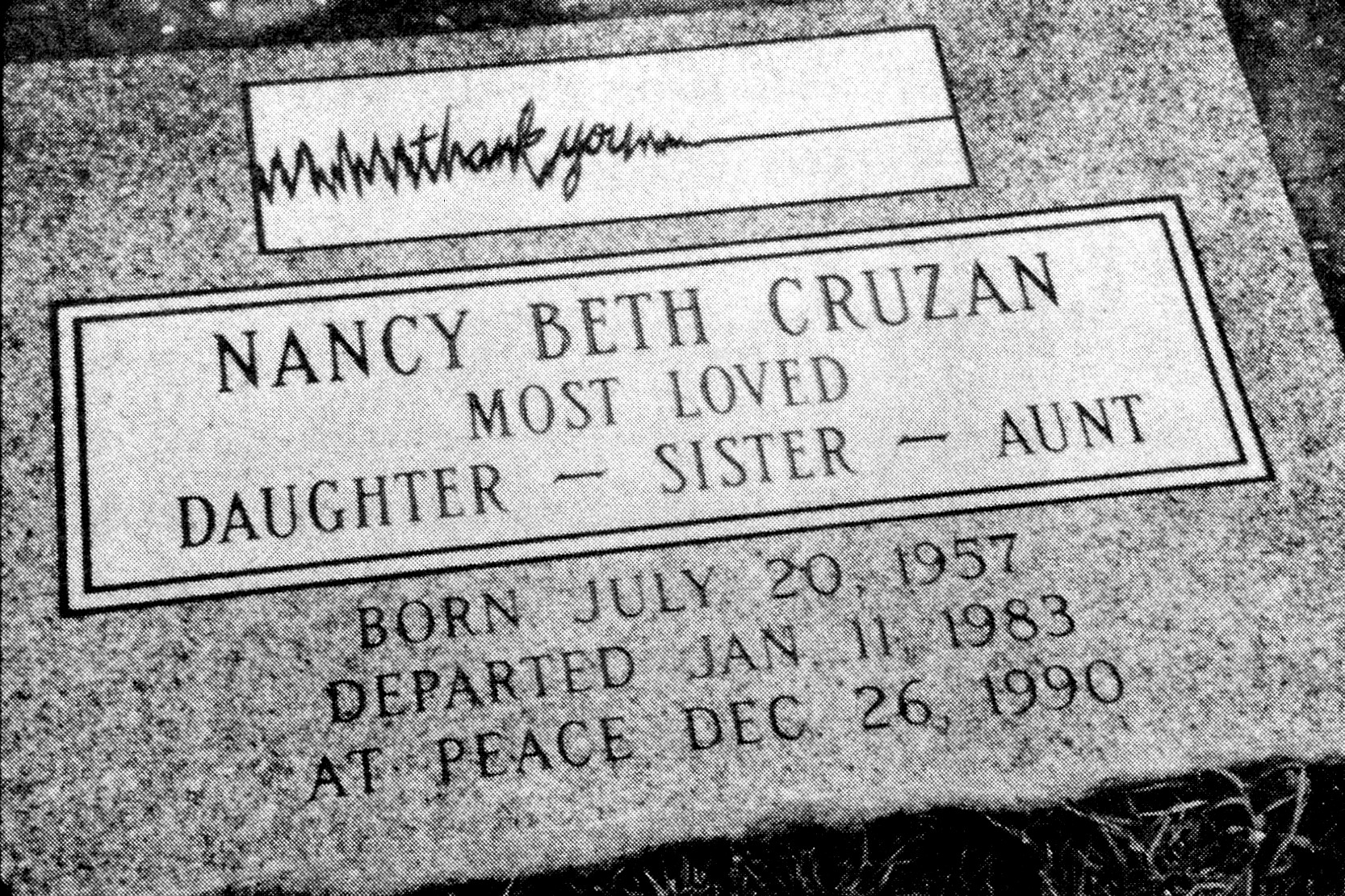
Nancy Cruzan's gravestone. Credit: Wellcome Library

After the Supreme Court's decision, the Cruzans gathered additional evidence that Cruzan would have wanted her life support terminated. The State of Missouri withdrew from the case in September 1990 since its law had been upheld and it had won the larger constitutional issue being considered.^{p. 29} With the Cruzans facing no opposition, Jasper County Probate Judge Charles Teel ruled that the Cruzans had met the evidentiary burden of "clear and convincing evidence." He issued a court order to remove Cruzan's feeding tube. On December 14, 1990, the feeding tube was removed, and Cruzan died on December 26, 1990.

Cruzan's case had attracted national interest, and right-to-life activists and organizations filed seven separate petitions with the court asking to resume feeding, but were found to have no legal standing for intervention.

At Cruzan's funeral, her father told reporters, "I would prefer to have my daughter back and let someone else be this trailblazer."^{p. 29} Six years later, on August 17, 1996, he died by suicide.

=== Significance ===
The Cruzan case set several important precedents:^{pp. 27–28}

- It established that the right to die was not a right guaranteed by the Constitution.
- It set out rules for what was required for a third party to refuse treatment on behalf of an incompetent person.
- It established that absent a living will or clear and convincing evidence of what the incompetent person would have wanted, the state's interests in preserving life outweigh the individual's rights to refuse treatment.
- It left it to the states to determine their own right-to-die standards, rather than creating a uniform national standard.

It also generated a great deal of interest in living wills and advance directives. For example, just one month after the Supreme Court ruling in Cruzan, the Society for the Right to Die had received some 300,000 requests for advance directive forms.

According to an article in The New York Times, the Cruzan case also helped increase support for the federal Patient Self-Determination Act, which became effective just under a year after Nancy Cruzan's death. The Act required hospitals and nursing homes that received federal funding to give patients advance-directive information and explain right-to-die options that are available under the laws of their states.

== See also ==
- List of United States Supreme Court cases, volume 497
- List of United States Supreme Court cases
- Lists of United States Supreme Court cases by volume
- List of United States Supreme Court cases by the Rehnquist Court
- Terri Schiavo case
