= Brian Darling =

American lawyer

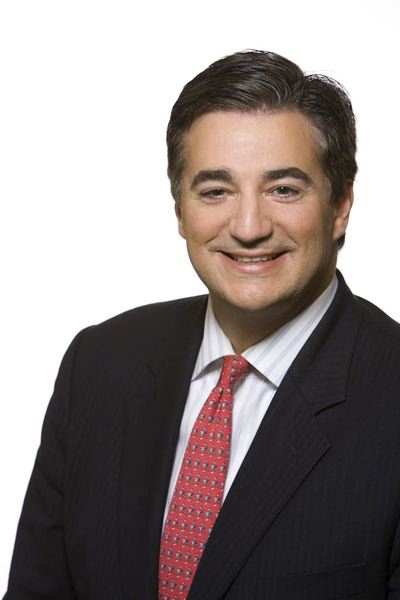
- Darling in March 2011
- Born: 1965 (age 60–61); Andover, Massachusetts, U.S.
- Education: New England School of Law (JD)
- Occupations: Founder and President
- Employer: Liberty Government Affairs

Brian Darling (born 1965) is an American lawyer, who is the president and founder of the firm Liberty Government Affairs. He was Senior Communications Director and Counsel for Senator Rand Paul (R-KY) and a former senior fellow in government studies at The Heritage Foundation, a conservative think-tank based in Washington, D.C. Darling has been involved in U.S. politics since the early 1990s, in roles as a congressional aide, lobbyist and legal counsel. Darling resigned as legal counsel to Republican Senator Mel Martinez of Florida after admitting he was the author of the Schiavo memo.

== Early life and education ==
Darling was born and grew up in Andover, Massachusetts. He attended the University of Massachusetts Amherst, where he launched a conservative student publication, The Minuteman, with fellow student Tony Rudy. Darling received his Juris Doctor degree from the New England School of Law.

== Career ==
Darling joined the U.S. Congress as an aide to Idaho Senator Steve Symms in 1992. The following year, Darling worked for Georgia Senator Paul Coverdell.

Darling became General Counsel to New Hampshire Senator Bob Smith in 1999. In January 2000, he and Senator Smith visited Cuban refugee Elián González before proposing legislation to grant González permanent residency. He was also a member of the Bush-Cheney recount team in Florida during the 2000 presidential election controversy and co-chairman of the Conservative Working Group, a weekly legislative strategy meeting of staffers from House and Senate offices.

In 2003, Darling became a partner in the Alexander Strategy Group lobbying firm, where he advocated for gun rights and other issues. He was a chief strategist for Senate legislation permitting airline pilots to carry handguns on the job.

In 2005, Darling became a legal counsel to Florida Senator Mel Martinez. He resigned from the position in May of that year following a controversy involving a strategy memo he had written based on the Terri Schiavo case. Later that year, Darling became director of United States Senate relations for The Heritage Foundation, where he was responsible for educating Senators and their staff about Heritage's latest research and policy recommendations.

During his time with Heritage, Darling wrote a research paper on the filibuster titled “The Filibuster Protects the Rights of All Senators and the American People,” and one on the Balanced Budget Amendment to the Constitution.

Darling was also a frequent spokesman for Heritage on Fox, Fox Business, MSNBC, and CNN. While at The Heritage Foundation, Darling had a regular column at Human Events.

After his time at Heritage, he wrote for The Observer. From 2012 to 2015, Darling served as both Counsel and Sr. Communications Director for Sen. Rand Paul (R-KY). In 2017, Darling founded the government relations firm Liberty Government Affairs to conduct public relations, lobbying, and outreach to the liberty movement.

== Schiavo memo ==
The Schiavo memo was a talking points memorandum on behalf of the Republican party, which described the ongoing Terri Schiavo case as "a great political issue" that could appeal to the party's base.

Senator Martinez, who claimed not to have read the memo, had inadvertently passed it to Iowa Senator Tom Harkin, a Democratic supporter of the legislation to keep Schiavo alive. National media outlets began reporting the existence of the memo shortly thereafter on March 18, 2005. On April 6, 2005, Darling admitted to writing the memo and resigned his position as legal counsel to Martinez.
