= Lindh v. Murphy =

- Supreme Court of the United States

Argued April 14, 1997 Decided June 23, 1997
- Full case name: Aaron Lindh v. Murphy, Warden
- Citations: 521 U.S. 320 (more) 117 S. Ct. 2059; 138 L. Ed. 2d 481

Court membership
- Chief Justice William Rehnquist Associate Justices John P. Stevens · Sandra Day O'Connor; Antonin Scalia · Anthony Kennedy; David Souter · Clarence Thomas; Ruth Bader Ginsburg · Stephen Breyer

Case opinions
- Majority: Souter, joined by Stevens, O'Connor, Ginsburg, Breyer
- Dissent: Rehnquist, joined by Scalia, Kennedy, Thomas

Laws applied
- Antiterrorism and Effective Death Penalty Act of 1996

Lindh v. Murphy, 521 U.S. 320 (1997), was a United States Supreme Court case in which the Court held the Antiterrorism and Effective Death Penalty Act of 1996's amendments to Title 28, Section 2254 of the United States Code applies to cases filed after the Act's effective date. The amendments "do not apply to pending noncapital cases such as Lindh's."

In his dissent, Chief Justice William Rehnquist argues that "in light of the whole of our retroactivity jurisprudence," pending cases should be subject to the Antiterrorism and Effective Death Penalty Act of 1996's amendments.

In Woodford v. Garceau (2003), the court held that a case does not become "pending" for the purposes of Lindh until an actual application for habeas relief is filed in federal court. A habeas application filed until after AEDPA's effective date is subject to AEDPA's amendments.
