= George Felos =

American 'right-to-die' attorney

George J. Felos
- Born: George James Felos; March 1952 (age 73–74); New York
- Education: Boston University School of Law (JD)
- Occupation: Lawyer

George James Felos (born March 1952) is an American lawyer specializing in right-to-die cases. He is best known for representing Terri Schiavo's husband Michael.

== Early life and education ==
Raised Greek-Orthodox, Felos graduated from Boston University School of Law with a Juris Doctor in 1976. He was admitted to the Florida Bar in 1977.

== Career ==
In 1990 he represented the family of Estelle Browning in an earlier right-to-die case at the Florida Supreme Court. Browning while still healthy had written a living will asking not to be artificially kept alive, before having a serious stroke, which had left her in a nursing home reliant on a feeding tube for nearly 3 years; a judge had prevented the will being enacted, but Felos litigated the case even after Browning's death in 1989. In 1990 in a "landmark ruling" the Florida Supreme Court decided in Browning's favor, ruling that the permanently incapacitated need not be force-fed.

His conduct in the Schiavo case caused controversy, because he had Terry Schiavo moved to the Suncoast Hospice, Florida, where until recently he had been chairman of the board.

He is also the author of Litigation as Spiritual Practice (Blue Dolphin Publishing), which combined discussion of legal practice with spiritual reflections on meditation and new-age religious beliefs.
