= Hyde Amendment (1997) =

The Hyde Amendment (Pub.L. 105-119, § 617, Nov. 26, 1997, 111 Stat. 2519, codified as a note following 18 U.S.C. § 3006A) is a federal statute allowing federal courts to award attorneys' fees and court costs to criminal defendants "where the court finds that the position of the United States was 'vexatious, frivolous, or in bad faith'". In such cases, the federal court may allow victims to recover some of the costs they incurred in fighting the government's investigation and prosecution by authorizing an award of attorneys' fees and court costs to a criminal defendant when the prosecution's evidence is so baseless as to be "frivolous." Compensation awarded under this statute would come out of the budget of the specific federal agency involved, typically the United States Attorney's Office.

The measure was introduced by Representative Henry Hyde (Republican-Illinois) as a rider to an appropriation bill and worked into the final 1997 Department of Justice bill by the United States Congress. The Justice Department was intensely opposed to the statute.

== Need for restraint ==
Prosecutorial abuse in the United States Attorney's Office has become a growing problem, as pressure to crack down on crime has increased. At the same time, maintaining adequate oversight of the US Department of Justice's practices and ethics has become increasingly difficult for Congress, the press, and the courts. Criminal defense attorneys are especially vulnerable to "bad faith" prosecutions and the burden that they place on the vindicated defendant.

There is no other department [of government] that is viewed with comparable terror or fear, because there is no other department that by itself can put you in jail or take your life, liberty or property away from you. The [Justice] Department has the FBI and the other agencies. It has become a Leviathan in the minds of a lot of people because it is so big and imponderable. I think it is correct to say that no outsider is capable of oversight.

Most prosecutors are elected officials, but that is not true of federal prosecutors, whose conduct is subject to the Hyde Amendment. The decision to file charges can be affected by public opinion or politically powerful groups. If prosecutors do not carefully screen the cases chosen to pursue, individuals may be charged even when there is insufficient evidence. The suspect's high public profile or the crime's sensational nature increasingly bears more weight on the decision to charge than the evidence or the nature of the crime.

Even under the Hyde Amendment, it is an acquitted defendant's responsibility to prove that the prosecutor acted in bad faith or that the case was frivolous. In U.S. v. Mary Louise Denese Slaey, the government dismissed all counts on August 2, 2006, but further review of her case was ongoing elsewhere, and she was not notified of the dismissal until February 2007. Slaey filed for legal reimbursement on April 3, 2007; her request was dismissed on April 25, 2007, because the August 2006 motion ended the issue from the court's perspective; therefore, her motion was dismissed as "out of time" (more than 30 days after the dismissal).

A 2010 investigation by USA Today "found the law has left innocent people... coping not only with ruined careers and reputations but with heavy legal costs. And it hasn't stopped federal prosecutors from committing misconduct or pursuing legally questionable cases." The investigation "documented 201 cases in the years since the law's passage in which federal judges found that Justice Department prosecutors violated laws or ethics rules. Although those represent a tiny fraction of the tens of thousands of federal criminal cases filed each year, the problems were so grave that judges dismissed indictments, reversed convictions or rebuked prosecutors for misconduct. Still, USA Today found only 13 cases in which the government paid anything toward defendants' legal bills. Most people never seek compensation. Most who do end up emptyhanded."

== Example: Aisenberg case ==
Sabrina, the five-month-old daughter of Marlene and Steve Aisenberg, vanished from their home in Valrico, Florida, on November 24, 1997. On Larry King Live, the Aisenbergs described how they cooperated with the police, prosecutors, and investigators in every way once the baby was found missing. However, since statistics show that a parent is usually responsible for a missing child, the police relied on that assumption in holding the Aisenbergs as the primary suspects. Barry Cohen, also a guest on Larry King Live, said he was retained by the Aisenbergs a few days later. He acknowledged that the police were fully within their rights to suspect the missing child's parents but said that they became obsessed with that hypothesis, even when they could find no evidence to support it, and they ceased looking for other leads. When the police failed to find evidence to support that conclusion, Cohen said, they lied to a state judge for permission to tape conversations in the Aisenberg household without permission. Since the tapes produced no incriminating evidence, evidence was fabricated, according to Cohen. The federal judge called the evidence false.

A federal judge in the United States District Court for the Middle District of Florida dismissed the case in February 2001, after a hearing reviewing the evidence, primarily in the form of audio tapes obtained by the police. The Aisenbergs were unaware that, for 79 days, investigators recorded more than 2,600 separate conversations on 55 audio tapes. The tapes, a key part of the prosecution's case, were ruled poor and inaudible. Cohen, when asked why law enforcement fabricated the case, said that he did not blame the police in particular but that the whole system was pressured for a successful prosecution, after the Susan Smith and JonBenét Ramsey cases. When asked why he was still involved in the case, Cohen answered:

We are going to look to hold everybody accountable for this terrible tragedy that has been imposed upon the Aisenbergs.... This case is indicative of a problem in this country that we need to realize exists. When we have police officers making a case and fabricating evidence, as the judge found in this case; when we have prosecutors telling a judge untruths about existence of facts on tapes, we have a serious problem. What do people do this country who can't afford lawyers like us to pursue this the way we did? They're framed and they go to jail daily.

=== U.S. v. Aisenberg, 247 F.Supp.2d 1272 (M.D.Fla. 2003) ===
In U.S. v. Aisenberg, the Aisenbergs and Barry Cohen's firm were awarded $2.9 million in legal fees and costs, under the Hyde Amendment. In a 98-page document, Judge Steven D. Merryday of the Middle District of Florida reviewed the case and explained why he ordered the federal government to pay a record-setting $2.9 million in legal fees and expenses under the Hyde Amendment for bringing a prosecution that was "vexatious, frivolous, or in bad faith." The judge's long decision is highly critical of the government. Also, the judge ordered the government to release the grand jury transcripts to the public, as "the public is entitled to know" about the "misdirected and overzealous prosecutorial exertions" in this case.

The Hyde Amendment assumed that billable hours would be capped at $125 per hour. However, because highly paid attorneys performed the work in this case, the rate of billable hours was considerably higher than $125. Judge Merryday scrutinized the 11,251 billable hours submitted by Cohen and associates and subtracted only 310 hours from the total. Cohen argued that because of the complexity of the case and its successful outcome, the rate of billable hours should be multiplied by three. (That is a standard practice in civil cases.) The judge declined to multiply the fees but agreed that a substantial increase in fees was warranted in this case, setting an important precedent, as an increase in fees had never previously been allowed in a Hyde Amendment case.

The Eleventh Circuit reversed the decision in part by finding that the $125 cap was, in fact, applicable to Hyde Amendment cases. 358 F.3d 1327 (11th Cir. 2004).
