= List of United States Supreme Court cases, volume 521 =

This is a list of all the United States Supreme Court cases from volume 521 of the United States Reports:

Case name	Citation	Date decided
United States v. Alaska	521 U.S. 1	1997
Abrams v. Johnson	521 U.S. 74	1997
Metropolitan Stevedore Co. v. Rambo	521 U.S. 121	1997
A worker is entitled to nominal compensation under the LHWCA when his work-related injury has not diminished their present wage-earning capacity under current circumstances but there is a significant potential that the injury will cause diminished capacity under future conditions.
O'Dell v. Netherland	521 U.S. 151	June 19, 1997
Klehr v. A. O. Smith Corp.	521 U.S. 179	1997
Agostini v. Felton	521 U.S. 203	1997
Idaho v. Coeur d'Alene Tribe of Idaho	521 U.S. 261	1997
Lindh v. Murphy	521 U.S. 320	1997
Kansas v. Hendricks	521 U.S. 346	1997
Richardson v. McKnight	521 U.S. 399	1997
Prison guards employed by a private firm are not entitled to a qualified immunity from suit by prisoners charging a § 1983 violation.
Metro-North Commuter R. Co. v. Buckley	521 U.S. 424	1997
Glickman v. Wileman Brothers & Elliott, Inc.	521 U.S. 457	1997
City of Boerne v. Flores	521 U.S. 507	1997
Lawyer v. Department of Justice	521 U.S. 567	1997
Amchem Products, Inc. v. Windsor	521 U.S. 591	1997
United States v. O'Hagan	521 U.S. 642	1997
Washington v. Glucksberg	521 U.S. 702	1997
Vacco v. Quill	521 U.S. 793	1997
Raines v. Byrd	521 U.S. 811	1997
Reno v. American Civil Liberties Union	521 U.S. 844	1997
Printz v. United States	521 U.S. 898	1997
Foreman v. Dallas County	521 U.S. 979	1997
Pounders v. Watson	521 U.S. 982	1997
