= Vincent Lambert case =

French right to die case

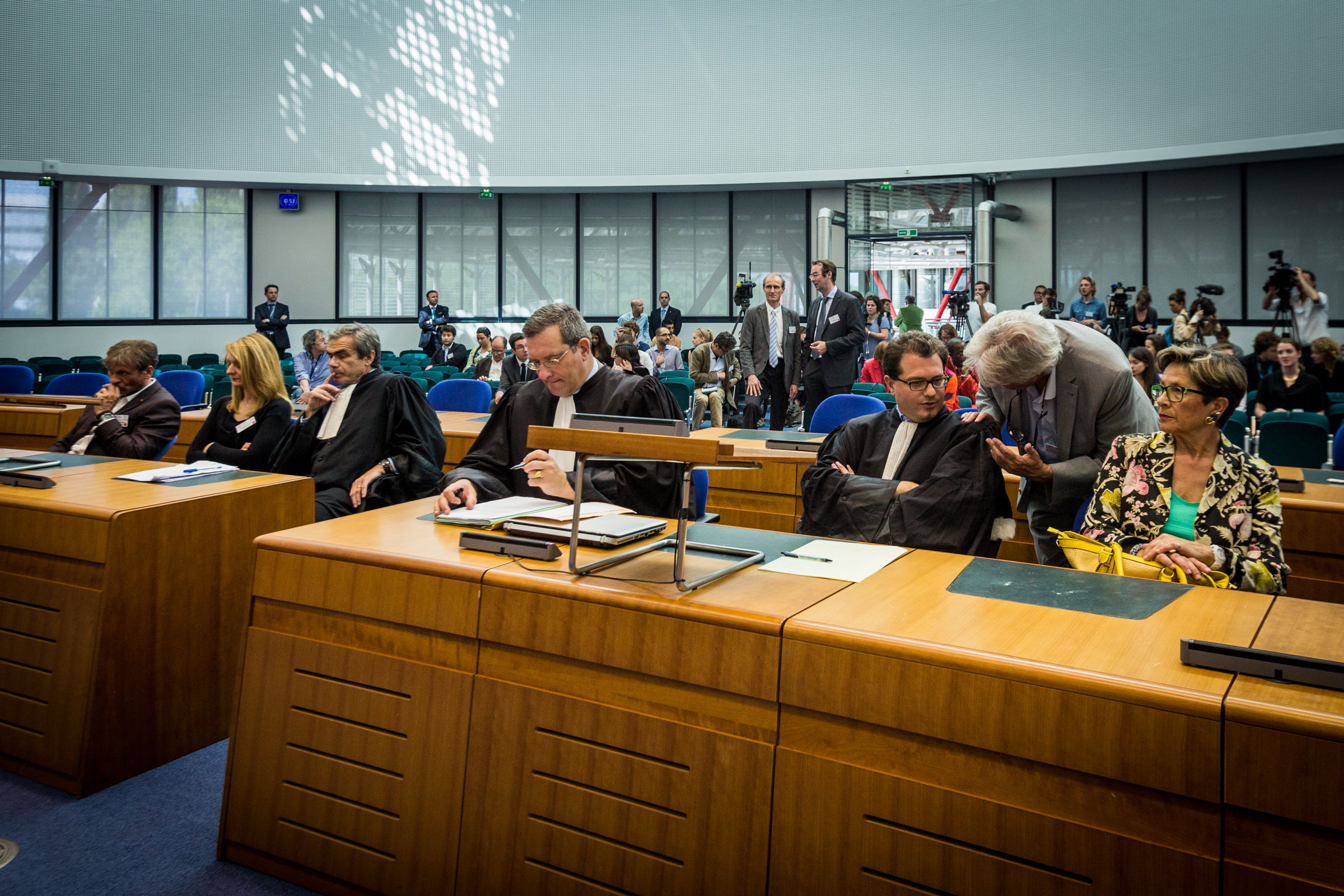
Hearing on the Lambert case in Strasbourg, 5 June 2015. Members of his family are seated in the first row.

Vincent Lambert (20 September 1976 in Châteauroux – 11 July 2019 in Reims) was a French man who in 2008 fell into a persistent vegetative state after sustaining critical injuries in a road accident. He had been working as a psychiatric nurse since 2000, and had been married since 2007 to his wife Rachel, then a nursing student.

Lambert's widow was willing to let him die according to the wishes he reportedly expressed prior to the accident but had never formalized into a written living will. His mother, Viviane Lambert, was determined to keep him alive, according to her strong Traditionalist Catholic convictions. After an eleven year legal battle between the two sides of his family, the courts allowed him to die through starvation in July 2019.

Similarly to the Terri Schiavo case in the United States, his case spurred highly publicized activism from the anti-abortion movement, the right-to-die movement, and disability rights groups, in France and French-speaking countries.
