= Letting die =

Withholding care

In non-consequentialist ethical thought, there is a moral distinction between killing and letting die. Whereas killing involves intervention, letting die involves withholding care (for example, in passive euthanasia), or other forms of inaction (such as in the Trolley problem).

Also in medical ethics there is a moral distinction between euthanasia and letting die. Legally, patients often have a right to reject life-sustaining care, in areas that do not permit euthanasia.

== See also ==
- Vacco v. Quill
- Right to die
- Do not resuscitate
- Rudy Linares case
