= Elizabeth Morgan Act =

1996 act of the US Congress

The Elizabeth Morgan Act is an act of the 104th United States Congress that was declared unconstitutional in 2003 by the U.S. Court of Appeals for the District of Columbia as being a bill of attainder, because it was written to deny rights to a specific father based on his child's assertion. It was originally introduced as H.R. 1855, by Rep. Thomas M. Davis. It was passed as a rider of the Department of Transportation and Related Agencies Appropriations Act, 1997 (H.R. 3675, Pub. L. 104–205 (text) (PDF)).

== Background ==
In 1985, plastic surgeon Elizabeth Morgan accused her ex-husband, dentist Eric Foretich, of sexually abusing their two-year-old daughter Hilary. Morgan, who had primary custody of the child, attempted to have Foretich's visitation rights revoked. After a police investigation did not substantiate Morgan's claims, a judge ordered her to allow Hilary to visit her father without supervision. When Morgan refused to do so, she was held in contempt of court and indefinitely detained in August 1987. While in jail, Morgan refused to reveal the whereabouts of her daughter, who was living with Morgan's parents in New Zealand.

In 1989, Representative Frank Wolf of Virginia introduced the bill that became the District of Columbia Civil Contempt Imprisonment Limitation Act (H.R. 2136, Pub. L. 101–97). That legislation removed the provision of District of Columbia law that permitted indefinite detention for civil contempt. While the bill did not mention Morgan or Foretich by name, its authors admitted that it was specifically intended to free Morgan from jail. Upon its September 1989 passage, the bill resulted in Morgan's release after 25 months of detainment. Morgan then moved to New Zealand to join her parents and daughter.

Wolf then co-sponsored the Elizabeth Morgan Act, a 1996 rider bill. The new law was narrowly worded to apply to the circumstances of Morgan's daughter, allowing a child in those circumstances to refuse consent to custody or visitation by her father, and preventing the District of Columbia courts from issuing custody or visitation orders or sanctions against Morgan. Upon its passage, Morgan and her daughter returned to the United States.

Foretich sued in 1997 to have the act declared unconstitutional. On December 16, 2003, the act invalidated by the U.S. Court of Appeals for the District of Columbia, which ruled that the law was so narrowly written that it functioned as an unconstitutional bill of attainder. However, the ruling had no practical effect on Hilary, who was aged 21 years and could choose whether to see her father.

== See also ==
- A Mother's Right: The Elizabeth Morgan Story
- Jonathan Turley, lead counsel for Eric Foretich
- Palm Sunday Compromise
