= Thalamic stimulator =

Neurological device

A thalamic stimulator is a medical device that can suppress tremors, such as those caused by Parkinson's disease or essential tremor. It was approved for use by the Food and Drug Administration (FDA) on August 4, 1997. Installation is invasive, so it is typically only used when the tremors are incapacitating, and medication is ineffective. Typically, one or more electrodes are implanted in the brain, with subcutaneous leads to a neurostimulator, which may also be implanted. The electrodes stimulate the area of the thalamus, specifically the part of the brain that controls movement and muscle function.

It is notable that the presence of thalamic stimulators significantly changes ECG patterns, and prevents the use of MRI. It is sometimes regarded as a better alternative to pallidotomy or thalamotomy because it is non-permanent. For optimal installation, the patient is awake during the procedure, and talks to the surgeon to find the best placement. Once in place, the device can be activated and deactivated, for improved effectiveness during the day.

Risks arising from the operation are infection, stroke and dysarthria.

A fictional treatment of the device, out decades before the device itself, can be found in the novel The Terminal Man.

== Sources ==
- Differential electrocardiographic artifact from implanted thalamic stimulator
- FDA Okays Powerful Brain Implant
- Washington University implanting brain device to control tremor
- New device offers relief for patients with tremors
