= Palm Sunday Compromise =

American federal law

The Palm Sunday Compromise, formally known as the Act for the relief of the parents of Theresa Marie Schiavo (Pub. L. 109–3 (text) (PDF)), is an Act of Congress passed on March 21, 2005, to allow the case of Terri Schiavo to be moved into a federal court. The name "Palm Sunday Compromise" was coined by House Majority Leader Tom DeLay, referring to it having been passed on Palm Sunday.

All of the federal petitions and appeals of Terri Schiavo's parents to maintain her life support were denied, and the U.S. Supreme Court declined to grant certiorari. In addition to this specific United States federal legislation, there was extensive other government involvement in the Terri Schiavo case at the Florida state and federal levels, none of which ultimately prevented the removal of her feeding tube.

== Passage of the Act ==
On March 19, congressional leaders announced that they were drafting a bill which would transfer the case from state court to federal court. In the early hours of March 20 and 21, Congress approved emergency legislation. The Senate first approved the bill (S. 686 CPS) on Palm Sunday, March 20, on a 3-0 voice vote of Senators Bill Frist (R-TN), Rick Santorum (R-PA), and Mel Martinez (R-FL). The bill was received in the House of Representatives at 9:02 p.m., and deliberation continued during the unusual Sunday session. When it came to a vote, the bill passed 203-58 (156 Republicans and 47 Democrats in favor, 5 Republicans and 53 Democrats against), with 174 Representatives (74 Republicans and 100 Democrats) not present on the floor at the time of the vote. The vote concluded at 12:41 a.m. EST; President Bush returned from vacation at his Prairie Chapel Ranch in Crawford, Texas, to Washington, D.C., and signed the bill at 1:11 a.m., when it became Public Law 109-3.

== Provisions ==
The act applied only to the parents of Terri Schiavo—not Terri Schiavo herself—and gave federal courts jurisdiction to review alleged violations of her constitutional rights, without regard to prior state court rulings (a review de novo, effectively wiping out the previous decade of litigation). However, Congress did not attempt to create any new substantive rights for Schiavo, or include any provision requiring the federal court to order reinsertion of the feeding tube pending review.

In practice, the act only delayed the removal of the feeding tube. Like in state court, the parents' federal claims were denied, first by federal judge James D. Whittemore, and then by the Eleventh Circuit Court of Appeals. Finally the U.S. Supreme Court declined to grant certiorari, effectively bringing an end to the prolonged litigation.

== Criticisms ==
The act was criticized on several grounds.

- The law did not pass the Senate before President Bush signed it. A majority of Senators (i.e., 51 of the 100) is required to obtain a quorum, and only three senators out of 100 were present when the bill was voted upon. However, the Senate (and the House) conduct their respective businesses under the presumption that a quorum is always present, unless or until a completed quorum call or roll-call vote demonstrates otherwise (e.g., a roll-call vote or quorum call in the Senate failing to get 51 total votes or replies).
- The law applied to only one individual. Comparisons were drawn with bills of attainder, which are specifically prohibited by the United States Constitution. While some saw this as a legally flawed analysis since bills of attainder take away individual rights rather than bestow them, the rights of Michael Schiavo, as Terri's guardian, to make decisions on her behalf were stripped away. Additionally, some argued that creating laws tailored for specific individuals is bad legislative practice as it means that other people in similar situations do not get relief, thus denying them equal protection. On Jonathan Turley's blog, the legal scholar who helped to overturn the Elizabeth Morgan Act, responders indicated as much. However, private bills—bills specifically directed at a particular person or persons—were extremely common in the U.S. Congress, such that Rule XV of the Rules of the House of Representatives establishes a calendar that provides for the consideration of private bills on the first and third Tuesdays of every month.
- The law was a violation of the separation of powers. Many commentators argued that Congress had exceeded its powers by substituting its judgment for that of the courts and directing the courts on how to proceed. This argument was addressed by Judge Stanley Francis Birch in a highly critical concurrence to the judgment of the United States Court of Appeals for the Eleventh Circuit, given on March 30, 2005. Judge Birch declared that:
  If the Act only provided for jurisdiction consistent with Article III, the Act would not be in violation of the principles of separation of powers. The Act, however, goes further. Section 2 of the Act provides that the district court: (1) shall engage in "de novo" review of Mrs. Schiavo's constitutional and federal claims; (2) shall not consider whether these claims were previously "raised, considered, or decided in State court proceedings"; (3) shall not engage in "abstention in favor of State court proceedings"; and (4) shall not decide the case on the basis of "whether remedies available in the State courts have been exhausted". Because these provisions constitute legislative dictation of how a federal court should exercise its judicial functions (known as a "rule of decision"), the Act invades the province of the judiciary and violates the separation of powers principle.
  An act of Congress violates separation of powers if it requires federal courts to exercise their Article III power "in a manner repugnant to the text, structure, and traditions of Article III". By setting a particular standard of review in the district court, Section 2 of the Act purports to direct a federal court in an area traditionally left to the federal court to decide. In fact, the establishment of a standard of review often dictates the rule of decision in a case, which is beyond Congress's constitutional power.
- The law failed to create any substantive rights. The law enacted by Congress only obliged the federal courts to review the rulings of the Florida state courts to determine if procedural due process had been afforded. However, there was no serious argument that the Florida courts had violated any constitutionally mandated procedural requirements. Congress could have specified in the statute that the bill sought to enforce a substantive due process right to life, enacted pursuant to section five of the Fourteenth Amendment to the U.S. Constitution. However, the social conservatives who championed the legislation have been reluctant to rely on the rights created under this provision, as it has also been interpreted by the Supreme Court as providing the underpinning for the right to abortion and for refusal to receive life-saving medical assistance.
- Barack Obama, while on the campaign trail to the Presidency, twice expressed regret for having allowed the Senate to adjourn by unanimous consent, which then made it possible for a handful of senators to introduce the bill. In the Democratic primary debate on April 26, 2007, he characterized his failure to object to the Senate's adjournment as his biggest professional mistake and that the Senate deliberations "left the Senate with a bill that allowed Congress to intrude where it shouldn't have".

== See also ==
- Ius singulare
