= George Greer =

American lawyer

George W. Greer

Sixth Circuit Court Judge for Florida
- In office 1992–2010

Pinellas County Commissioner
- In office 1984–1992

Personal details
- Born: 1942 (age 83–84) Brooklyn, New York, NY

George W. Greer (born 1942) is a retired Florida circuit judge who served in Florida's Sixth Circuit Court (Pinellas-Pasco counties), family law division, in Clearwater, Florida. He received national attention in 2005 when he presided over the Terri Schiavo case.

== Early life and education ==
Born in 1942 in Brooklyn, New York, Greer grew up in Dunedin, Florida. He received his Associate degree from St. Petersburg Junior College in 1962, his bachelor's degree from Florida State University at Tallahassee in 1964, and his law degree from the University of Florida's College of Law in Gainesville in 1966.

== Career ==
Greer is a Republican who was once a member of a Southern Baptist Church.

Greer served as a county commissioner for Pinellas County as a Republican from 1984 to 1992. He was first elected to the Sixth Judicial Circuit Court in 1992 on a nonpartisan ballot, and was reelected in 1998 and again in 2004. He retired in 2010 when his term expired, and was succeeded by Patricia Muscarella.

=== Terri Schiavo case ===
Greer received substantial attention in national and international media for his involvement in the Terri Schiavo case.

Because Greer's controversial decisions in the Schiavo case conflicted with the opinions of patrons at his church, the Calvary Baptist Church of Clearwater, Greer was asked by pastor William Rice to clarify his relationship with his church. Greer then withdrew his membership from the Calvary congregation.

In 2005 Greer was threatened with impeachment for his decisions in the Terri Schiavo case. Attorney Barry Cohen represented Greer, who retained his position.

=== Hogan divorce case ===
Greer presided over the 2008 divorce case of Hulk Hogan and his wife, Linda Bollea. On January 30, 2008, Greer denied Bollea's motion to have Hogan's assets frozen.
