= Political base =

Cohort of voters who support a politician or party

In politics, a candidate or party's base or core support refers to the voters who support them for elected office based on core values. On the left–right political spectrum, left-leaning bases tend to be liberal while right-leaning bases tend to be conservative. In the United States, high-level candidates must hold the same stances on key issues as a party's base in order to gain the party's nomination and thus be guaranteed ballot access. In the case of legislative elections, base voters often prefer to support their party's candidate against an otherwise appealing opponent in order to strengthen their party's chances of gaining a majority in the legislature.

== Concept in political science ==
In political science and sociology, a political base (or social base) refers to the core group of voters and social forces that provide a candidate or party with their primary, stable support. Scholars analyze this "base" through several lenses, ranging from demographic characteristics to deep-seated psychological worldviews.

== Political bases in U.S. elections ==
In the United States, political bases are primarily divided between the Democratic and Republican parties, though recent elections have shown a significant "partisan realignment," where traditional voter blocs are shifting.

=== The Democratic Party base ===
The Democratic base is increasingly defined by educational attaintment and urban geography Their demographic base constitutes African Americans, Latino/Hispanics, and White voters, with a majority being younger voters (under 45).

=== The Republican Party base ===
The Republican base has rested on "three legs": social conservatism, fiscal conservatism, and strong national defense. Under the influence of Trumpism, it has shifted toward a more populist, working-class foundation. Their demographic base constitutes rural voters, White Southerners, and White Evangelical Christians, while recent elections have shown significant growth among men and working-class minority voters.

== See also ==
- Split-ticket voting
- Straight-ticket voting
- Voting bloc
