= Talking point =

Pre-established message or formula used in some fields involving communication

A talking point is a pre-established message or formula used in the field of political communication, sales and commercial or advertising communication. The message is coordinated a priori to remain more or less invariable regardless of which stakeholder brings the message in the media. Such statements can either be free standing or created as retorts to the opposition's talking points and are frequently used in public relations, particularly in areas heavy in debate such as politics and marketing.

== See also ==
- Factoid
- Fact sheet
- Framing (social sciences)
