= Life imprisonment in the United States =

Local application of criminal punishment in the United States of America

In the United States, life imprisonment is the most severe punishment provided by law in states with no valid capital punishment statute, and second-most in those with a valid statute. According to a 2013 study, one of every nine prison inhabitants of the U.S. were imprisoned for life as of 2012.

American case law and penology literature traditionally divides life sentences into "determinate life sentences" or "indeterminate life sentences". The latter indicates the possibility of an abridged sentence, usually through the process of parole. For example, a sentence of "15 years to life" or "25 years to life" is called an "indeterminate life sentence", while a sentence of "life without the possibility of parole" or "life without parole" (LWOP) is called a "determinate life sentence". West Virginia uses the unique terms "life with mercy" and "life without mercy", respectively, for these two categories.

The first category are "indeterminate" in that the true length of each prisoner's sentence is not determined up front by the sentencing court, but will depend upon when the prisoner can convince the state parole board of their rehabilitation after serving the minimum number of years provided for in the sentence. The ability of most prisoners to earn good conduct time sentence reductions further complicates the calculation of when a particular prisoner will actually get to first meet the parole board. The second category are "determinate" in that it is expressly determined by the sentencing court up front that the prisoner will never have the chance to see the parole board. Therefore, criminals given a determinate life sentence will typically die in prison, without ever being released. If a life without parole sentence is imposed, executive branch government officials (usually the state governor) may have the power to grant a pardon, or to commute a sentence to time served, effectively ending the sentence early.

Many U.S. states offer parole after a decade or more has passed, but in California, people sentenced to life imprisonment can normally apply for parole after seven years. Florida leads the country with nearly one quarter of the nation's LWOP prisoners, more than California, New York and Texas combined.

== History ==
In the 1860s, reformation became favored over penitence in American penology, with the role of prisons seen as reforming prisoners, who were imprisoned until reform was achieved. The concepts of parole and indeterminate sentencing were regarded as forward-looking in the 1870s. The initial concept of parole came from the idea that prisoners began their path to rehabilitation during their sentence, and their successful rehabilitation could be recognizable by a parole board. The importance was placed on eradicating crime and having prisoners deemed ready to enter society as soon as possible. However, the ideals were not as successful as had been hoped. Crime was not eradicated, reformatories had the same problems as prisons on politicization and underfunding, and indeterminate sentencing became undermined by prisoners, who quickly found that it was possible to "beat the system" by pretense to get a better chance of winning parole. Many were soon back in custody. Similarly, prison authorities could twist it to their advantage by using those granted parole or probation to spy on and actively help to imprison other people, or sometimes by selectively denying parole. However, the biggest cause of the reformatories' failure to live up to expectations was that despite the enthusiasm of reformers and Zebulon Brockway's call for an end to vengeance in criminal justice, those within the prison environment, both inmates and guards alike, continued to conceive of prison as a place of retribution.

=== Schick's case and life imprisonment without parole ===
In 1954 (November 28), Master Sergeant Maurice L. Schick was convicted by military court-martial of the murder of nine-year-old Susan Rothschild at Camp Zama in Japan (Tokyo). The soldier admitted the killing stating he had a sudden "uncontrollable urge to kill something quickly and quietly” and had chosen his victim "just because she was there."

Schick was sentenced to death. Six years later, the case was forwarded to President Dwight Eisenhower for final review. He exercised his right of executive clemency to commute Schick's death sentence to confinement with hard labor for the term of his natural life, with the express condition that he "shall never have any rights, privileges, claims or benefits arising under the parole and suspension or remission of sentence laws of the United States."

In 1971, Schick began a legal challenge against his whole life sentence. The appeal eventually reached the U.S. Supreme Court in 1974. It examined the constitutional basis of the punishment: life imprisonment without parole. Had Schick been given an ordinary life sentence, he would have been eligible for parole in 1969.

Although Schick's sentence was given only cursory mention, the court concluded a whole life sentence was constitutional. Schick, together with only five other federal prisoners who were still ineligible for parole at the time, was made eligible for parole by a separate pardon from President Gerald Ford in 1977. He was paroled in 1979 and died a free man in Palm Beach, Florida in 2004.

Despite the Schick opinion's lack of thorough analysis on life imprisonment without a chance of parole, an imposing amount of precedent has developed based upon it. After Furman v. Georgia, the constitutionality of life imprisonment without parole as an alternative to the death penalty received increased attention from lawmakers and judges.

Such penalties predate Schick. One early American case was Ex parte Wells (1856); Wells was convicted of murder in 1851 and sentenced to be hanged. On the day of his execution, President Millard Fillmore gave him a conditional pardon commuting his sentence to "imprisonment for life in the penitentiary at Washington." Wells appealed the conditions of his pardon, but the sentence was upheld with no discussion by the majority of the purpose of the substituted punishment.

=== Minors ===
A few countries worldwide have allowed for minors to be given lifetime sentences that have no provision for eventual release. Countries that allow life imprisonment without a possibility of parole for juveniles include Antigua and Barbuda, Cuba, Dominica, Israel, Nigeria, Saint Vincent and the Grenadines, the Solomon Islands, Sri Lanka, Tanzania and the United States. Of these, only the U.S. currently has minors serving such sentences. The University of San Francisco School of Law's Center for Law & Global Justice conducted international research on the use of the sentence of life without parole for juveniles, and has found no cases outside the U.S. in which the sentence is actually imposed on juveniles. As of 2009, Human Rights Watch has calculated that there are 2,589 youth offenders serving life without parole in the U.S.

In the U.S., juvenile offenders started to get life without parole sentences more frequently in the 1990s due to John J. DiIulio Jr's. Teenage Superpredator Theory.

In 2010, the U.S. Supreme Court ruled that sentencing minors to automatic sentences of life without a chance of parole for crimes other than those involving a homicide (generally, first-degree murder, and usually with aggravating factors or accompanying felonies) violated the Eighth Amendment's ban on "cruel and unusual punishments", in the case of Graham v. Florida. In finding that the U.S. Constitution prohibits as cruel and unusual punishment a life without parole sentence for a juvenile in a non-homicide case, the U.S. Supreme Court stated that "the overwhelming weight of international opinion against" juvenile life without a chance of parole "provide[s] respected and significant confirmation for our own conclusions". In 2012, in the case of Miller v. Alabama, the Court considered whether to ban the automatic use of it completely as a sentence for minors. The Court had already judged the death penalty unconstitutional for minors in 2005. In June 2012, the Court ruled that it could never be automatically used as a sentence for a minor (under 18), although the Court left room for it as a sentence that can eventually be given (for now) in certain first-degree murder cases once the judge has taken mitigating circumstances and other factors into account. The U.S. practice of sentencing juveniles to life imprisonment without a possibility of parole violates international standards of justice, as well as treaties to which the U.S. is a party. Each state must ensure that its criminal punishments comply with the United States' international treaty obligations:

- The International Covenant on Civil and Political Rights; the oversight Committee instructed the U.S. to: "ensure that no such child offender is sentenced to life without parole [and] adopt all appropriate measures to review the situation of persons already serving such sentences".
- The United Nations Convention Against Torture; the oversight Committee warned the U.S. that juvenile life sentences without a possibility of parole could constitute "cruel, inhuman or degrading treatment or punishment" for youth.
- The oversight body of the Committee on the Elimination of Racial Discrimination found that juvenile life without a chance of parole is applied disproportionately to black minors, and the U.S. has done nothing to reduce what has become pervasive discrimination. The Committee recommended that the U.S. discontinue the use of this sentence against persons under the age of eighteen at the time the offense was committed, and review the situation of persons already serving such sentences and in 2016, in the case of Montgomery v. Louisiana, the Supreme Court ruled that Miller v. Alabama was to be applied retroactively to offenders convicted before 2012.

The United Nations General Assembly has called upon governments to: "abolish by law, as soon as possible...life imprisonment without possibility of release for those below the age of 18 years at the time of the commission of the offense".

International standards of justice hold that a juvenile life imprisonment without a possibility of parole is not warranted under any circumstances because juvenile offenders lack the experience, education, intelligence and mental development of adults and must be given a reasonable opportunity to obtain release based on demonstrated maturity and rehabilitation.

By May 2023, 28 states and the District of Columbia have completely banned life without parole sentences for all juvenile offenders while five states have not banned the sentence but do not have any juvenile offenders serving life without parole.

=== Young adults ===
In January 2024, the Massachusetts Supreme Judicial Court ruled in Commonwealth vs. Sheldon Mattis that life imprisonment without the possibility of parole for defendants under the age of 21 was prohibited cruel and unusual punishment under the Constitution of Massachusetts. This decision made Massachusetts the first U.S. state with such a rule.

== Use ==
Although sentences vary for each state, life imprisonment is generally mandatory for first-degree murder, particularly if it is done during the commission of another felony (the felony murder rule), or there are other aggravating circumstances present (such as rapes before such murders or for murder of any law enforcement official or other public servant) in all 50 states and the District of Columbia, including states without the death penalty, and as one or the only alternative sentence in states that have the death penalty and in federal and military courts. Life imprisonment is also a mandatory punishment in Idaho for aircraft hijacking, New York for terrorism, Florida for capital sexual battery (sexual abuse of a child under 12 that causes injury to the child), and Georgia for a second conviction of armed robbery, kidnapping, or rape and other serious violent felonies under Georgia's seven-deadly-sins law. Life imprisonment is a possibility for aggravated mayhem and torture in California. Life imprisonment is mandatory for kidnapping in Nebraska. Other specifics about life sentences in the United States continue to vary widely by individual states.

In addition, the sentence of life imprisonment may also be given for "drug kingpins" and "habitual criminals". It has been applied in every state except Alaska, as well as in the federal courts. In Alaska, the maximum term of imprisonment is for 99 years without parole, which is considered to be de facto life imprisonment without parole.

== Statistics ==
Over 200,000 people, or about 1 in 7 prisoners in the United States, were serving life or virtual life sentences in 2019. Over 50,000 prisoners are serving life without a chance of parole. In 1993, the Times survey found, about 20 percent of all lifers had no chance of parole. By 2004, that had risen to 28 percent.

As a result, the U.S. is currently housing by far the world's largest and most permanent population of prisoners who are guaranteed to die behind bars. The next closest country was Kenya, with only about 3,700 prisoners serving life without parole as of 2016. At the Louisiana State Penitentiary, for instance, more than 3,000 of the 5,100 prisoners are serving life with a chance of parole, and most of the remaining 2,100 are serving sentences so long that they cannot be completed in a typical lifetime. About 150 inmates have died there in the time period between the years of 2000 and 2005. The United States holds 40% of the world's prisoners with life sentences, more than in any other country.

== Parole and nonviolent offenses ==
Under the federal criminal code, however, with respect to offenses committed after December 1, 1987, parole has been abolished for all sentences handed down by the federal system, including life sentences. A life sentence from a federal court will therefore result in imprisonment for the life of the defendant unless a pardon or reprieve is granted by the President, if, upon appeal, the conviction is quashed, or compassionate release is granted.

In several states, such as Colorado and Florida, life sentences are usually without the possibility of parole, with the exception for minors. With exceptions for minors, the other states that do not permit parole for sentences of life imprisonment under any circumstances (except in rare circumstances such as communication by the Governor) include Illinois, Iowa, Louisiana, Maine, Pennsylvania, South Dakota, Nebraska, Wyoming and Arkansas. North Carolina largely abolished discretionary parole for crimes committed on or after October 1, 1994, under the Structured Sentencing Act. For most modern life sentences, it functions like the other "never-allows-parole-for-life sentences" states. South Carolina abolished parole for most serious crimes committed on or after January 1, 1996. While "life with parole" exists for older cases, most modern life sentences in South Carolina are served without any possibility of parole as well and Washington State also abolished discretionary parole in 1984 and the majority of life sentences imposed there in modern times is also without eligibility for parole.

Over 3,200 people nationwide are serving life terms without a chance of parole for nonviolent offenses. Of those prisoners, 80 percent are behind bars for drug-related convictions: 65 percent are African-American, 18 percent are Latino, and 16 percent are white. The ACLU has called the statistics proof of "extreme racial disparities." Some of the crimes that led to life sentences include stealing gas from a truck and shoplifting but only for those with a pattern of habitual criminal offenses. A large number of those imprisoned for life had no prior criminal history but were given the sentence because of the aggravated nature of their crimes.

=== Three-strikes law ===
Under some controversial sentencing guidelines known as "three-strikes laws," existing both at state and federal level, a person who is convicted of an offense and who has one or two other previous serious convictions is to serve a mandatory or discretionary life sentence in prison, with or without parole depending on the jurisdiction. Notably, a broad range of crimes ranging from petty theft to murder could serve as the trigger for a mandatory or discretionary life sentence in California from 1994 to 2012. Notably, the U.S. Supreme Court has on several occasions upheld lengthy sentences for petty theft including life with the possibility of parole and 50 years to life and stated that neither sentence conflicted with the ban on "cruel and unusual punishment" in the Eighth Amendment to the U.S. Constitution. These court decisions have been the subject of considerable controversy.

== Debates ==
Increased use of the life imprisonment sentence, especially life without parole, came in response to debates on capital punishment. In fact, many politicians, especially in the Democratic Party, expressed their emphasis on replacing the death penalty with life without parole. Additionally, seeking the death penalty is more costly to the state and taxpayer than seeking life without parole.

A common argument against life without parole is that it is equally as immoral as the death penalty, as it still sentences one to die in prison. Certain organizations and campaigns have been founded with a goal to work against life imprisonment and improve the rate of release. For example, the #DropLWOP campaign is dedicated to dropping the life without parole sentence and providing an automatic commutation and chance to see a parole board for all prisoners serving life sentences.

== See also ==
- Whole life order, a determinate life sentence sometimes handed down under English criminal law
- Black site
