= Community Hospice & Palliative Care =

American not-for-profit hospice

Coordinates: 30.2048°N 81.6055°W

- Type: Non-Profit
- Industry: Hospice care
- Founded: 1979 (Jacksonville)
- Founder: Paul Richard Brenner
- Headquarters: Jacksonville, Florida
- Area served: Duval, St. Johns, Clay, Baker, Nassau, Alachua, Bradford, Columbia, Dixie, Gilchrist, Hamilton, Lafayette, Levy, Putnam, Suwannee, and Union Counties
- Key people: Susan Ponder-Stansel, President & CEO
- Products: Hospice care
- Website: https://www.communityhospice.com/

Community Hospice & Palliative Care, also known simply as Community Hospice, is a non-profit hospice, which has served the Greater Jacksonville Metropolitan Area since its inception in 1979. The organization was the first hospice program in Northeast Florida and one of a few operating programs in the state when Florida began granting hospice licenses in 1981; Community Hospice received their license in 1983 and in 2008, assisted nearly 1,000 patients daily and more than 6,000 patients a year.

== History ==
Community Hospice was founded by two nurses, one minister (Paul Richard Brenner), and a small group of volunteers who worked out of an office at Methodist Hospital. The program was certified by Medicare in 1983, and like all Hospice organizations in the United States, relies on Medicare for 80-85% of their revenue. Unlike most other hospices, Community Hospice receives no money from the local United Way; instead relying on the Community Hospice Foundation as a reliable source of funding. The remainder of their operating income comes from contributions from clients, fund raising initiatives throughout the year and private insurance payments.

== Children ==
The needs of children with life-limiting and life-threatening conditions are very different from those of adults. Community PedsCare, the pediatric palliative and hospice program developed by Community Hospice in collaboration with Wolfson Children's Hospital, Nemours Children's Clinic and University of Florida. The program, begun in 2000, offers individualized support, comfort and care to these children and their families.

In October, 2008, PedsCare was a recipient of the 2008 Quality in Palliative Care Leadership Award, which is "presented annually to recognize organizations which have enhanced their palliative care services by implementing the palliative care principles supported by the National Consensus Project for Quality Palliative Care and the National Quality Forum".

== Locations ==
Community Hospice provides services to 90% of the Greater Jacksonville market area. The organization has several outreach centers and eight "Centers for Caring" for patients who require treatment for symptoms that cannot be managed in another setting. A facility in St. Johns County, Florida is the newest inpatient location.

Mandarin
The Earl B. Hadlow Center for Caring was Community Hospice's first residential facility. The 50,000-square-foot (4,600 m^{2}) building in Mandarin opened in 1985 and now contains 38 beds.
Northside
The George and Margaret Morris Center for Caring is an 8,500-square-feet, 12-bed wing short-term care facility located on the 6th floor at Shands Jacksonville Pavilion. The Morris Center opened in September, 2001.
Westside
The Dr. Gaston J. Acosta-Rua Center for Caring opened in January, 2007 to serve patients in west Jacksonville, northern Clay and Baker counties. The 16-bed facility is located in a 27,000-square-foot (2,500 m^{2}) building. The center encourages overnight stays by family, brief visits by family pets and visitors at any time, day or night.
Beaches
The Anne and Donald McGraw Center for Caring at Mayo Clinic Hospital opened in December, 2007. The 23,000-square-foot (2,100 m^{2}) facility includes 16 inpatient beds in private rooms. The center encourages overnight stays by family, brief visits by family pets and visitors at any time, day or night.
St. Augustine
Community Hospice established an outreach center in St. Augustine in 1985, but there was no inpatient facility until the Bailey Family Center for Caring at Flagler Hospital opened on January 8, 2011. The 11,700-square-foot (1,090 m^{2}) structure includes 12 beds in private rooms.

Other community outreach offices are located at Gateway Office and Nassau County Office.

== Education ==
The Charles M. Neviaser Educational Institute at Community Hospice provides clinical education to area medical professionals on subjects related to hospice and palliative care, including pain management, the dying process, grief and loss, advance directives and ethics in end-of-life care. There are no other independent, nonprofit hospices in Florida that provide this information.

In September, 2004, the Neviaser Educational Institute, together with Mayo Clinic Jacksonville established a 12-month physician fellowship in palliative medicine to train physicians in end-of-life or chronic, non-curable disease care.

The Institute also served the Northeast Florida community with educational outreach programs to consumers.

== Foundation ==
The Community Hospice Foundation, established in 2000, provides funding to support end-of-life care and education. Funding is made possible through individual and corporate donations, planned gifts from will and estates, and special fundraising events.

== Fund raisers ==
Community Hospice holds several fund raisers each year with proceeds benefiting patients who are unable to pay for their care. Among them:

- Halloween Doors & More: The fourth-annual event on October 18, 2008 attracted 1,600 people and raised over $440,000 for Community PedsCare. Those funds enabled the agency to double the size of PedsCare and help more than 100 local children and their families.
- Tree of Life: The 2008 event was the 18th year of this traditional grounds' decoration. A Candlelight Service of Remembrance is held to celebrate the lives of loved ones who have died.
- Wednesday Bingo Night.

In addition, it maintains the Community Hospice Thrift Shop to help raise funds.

Other groups and organizations have also assisted in fundraising for Community Hospice & Palliative Care. The Amelia Island Concours d'Elegance has primarily donated its annual proceeds to Community Hospice & Palliative Care, totalling over $1.5 million since 1998. The Esprit de Corps, a group of young professionals founded in 1986, provides volunteers to assist in Community Hospice events.

== Homicide survivors ==
Community Hospice was awarded a $70,000 grant to support the Homicide Survivor's Program, a pilot project at the Duval County Medical Examiner's Office. Counselors provided grief and loss services to family members of homicide victims. In 2005, there were 125 homicides in the 4th Judicial Circuit.

== Five Wishes ==
Aging with Dignity named Community Hospice of Northeast Florida as the 2006 "National Innovator" for being the single largest distributor in the United States of the Five Wishes living will. Community Hospice distributed 358,000 copies of the living will to residents of Baker, Clay, Duval, Nassau and St. Johns counties. The document was created by Aging with Dignity.

== Georgia ==
Community Hospice merged with Hospice of Southeast Georgia in 1994, creating Community Hospice of Southeast Georgia (CHSG). The organization assisted 100-125 patients yearly in Glynn, McIntosh, Ware, Camden, Brantley and Charlton counties in Georgia. As Hospice of the Golden Isles in Brunswick, Georgia grew, they expanded their service area, which overlapped that of CHSG. There were barely enough patients for one agency, and CHSG lost $200,000 in FY 2000, so to avoid competing, CHSG stopped accepting patients in late 2001.
