= Jim Towey =

American university president, former government official

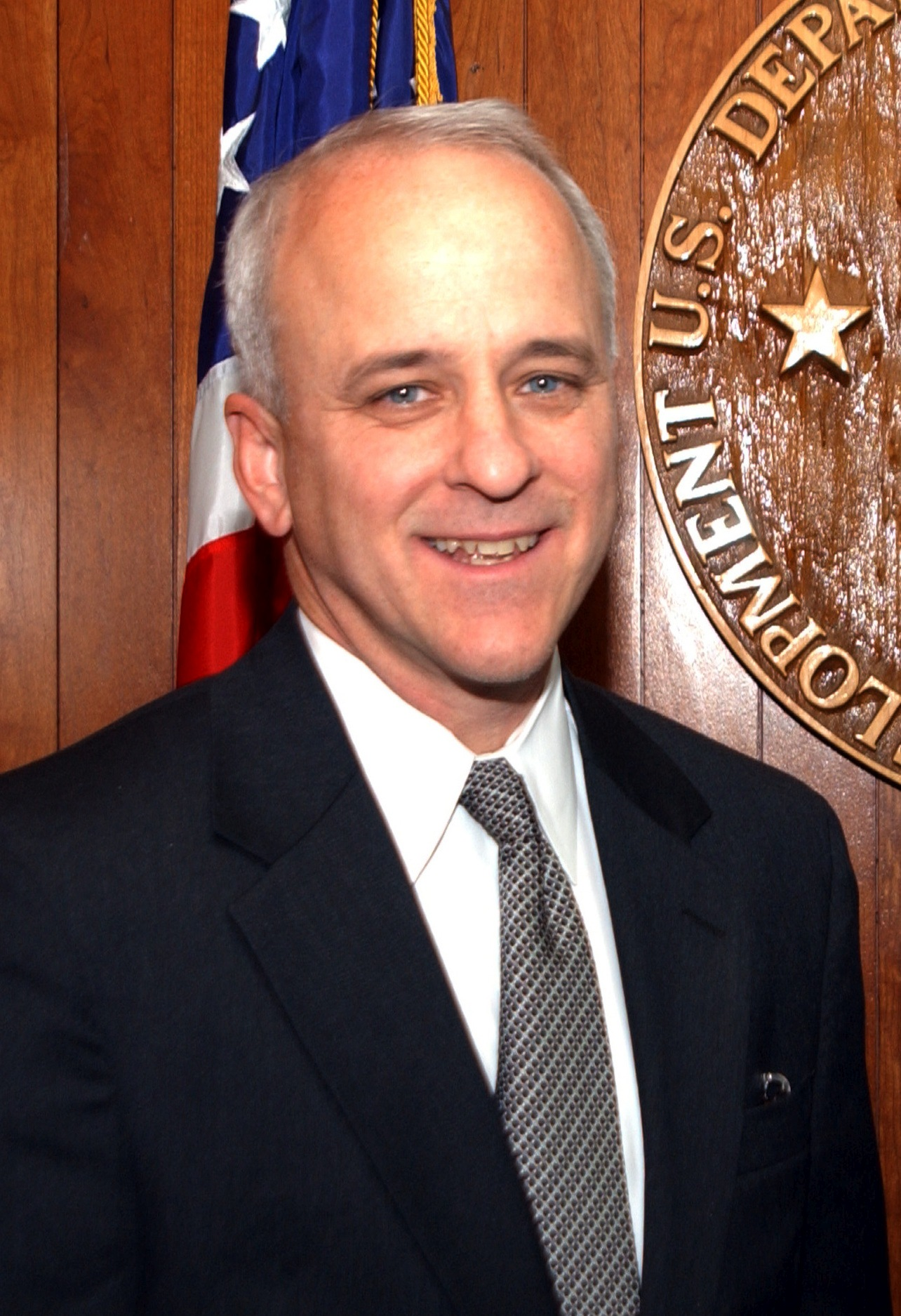

President of Ave Maria University
- In office July 1, 2011 – December 31, 2019
- Preceded by: Nicholas Healy
- Succeeded by: Christopher Ice

President of Saint Vincent College
- In office July 1, 2006 – June 30, 2010
- Preceded by: James Will
- Succeeded by: Norman Hipps

Director of the White House Office of Faith-Based and Community Initiatives
- In office February 1, 2002 – June 2, 2006
- President: George W. Bush
- Preceded by: John DiIulio
- Succeeded by: Jay Hein

Secretary of the Florida Department of Health and Rehabilitative Services
- In office July 7, 1993 – June 9, 1995
- Governor: Lawton Chiles
- Preceded by: Buddy MacKay
- Succeeded by: Ed Feaver

Personal details
- Born: October 1, 1956 (age 69)
- Spouse: Mary Towey (m. 1992)
- Children: 5
- Education: Florida State University (BS, JD)

Harry James Towey II (/ˈtuːi/; born October 1, 1956) is an American former government official and academic administrator. Towey was appointed secretary of the Florida Department of Health and Rehabilitative Services by Governor Lawton Chiles in 1993, and ousted by the Florida Senate in 1995. He founded Aging with Dignity, a nonprofit advocacy organization for senior citizens, in 1996 and coauthored the end-of-life planning document Five Wishes. He was Director of the White House Office of Faith-Based and Community Initiatives (OFBCI) from February 2002 to May 2006. Towey was President of Saint Vincent College from 2006 to 2010 and President and CEO of Ave Maria University from 2011 to 2019.

== Personal life ==
Towey was born in Terre Haute, Indiana, and named after his paternal uncle, a Catholic priest. He graduated from Bishop Kenny High School in Jacksonville, Florida, in 1974, and received a B.S. in accounting in 1978 and a J.D. in 1981 from Florida State University. During his seven years at FSU, he participated in the men's basketball program as a student manager and graduate assistant. He met his wife, Mary, while volunteering for the Missionaries of Charity; the two married in 1992 and have five children. Towey is a member of the Knights of Columbus.

== Career ==
=== Aide to Hatfield ===
Towey worked for Oregon Senator Mark Hatfield as legislative director and legal counsel between 1982 and 1988. Towey shared Hatfield's support for the pro-life movement. According to Lionel Rosenblatt, Towey's work for Hatfield during the Indochina refugee crisis led the White House to issue a 1983 National Security Study Directive ordering the review of refugee applications previously rejected by the Immigration and Naturalization Service.

=== Legal counsel for Mother Teresa and biographer ===
In 1985, while traveling for Hatfield, Towey met Mother Teresa in Calcutta. Shortly after, he began working as a U.S. legal counsel to the Missionaries of Charity. He arranged immigration matters for the order's nuns and prevented the unauthorized use of Mother Teresa's name and image. Towey volunteered full-time with the order for a total of nearly two years between 1988 and 1990, in Tijuana, Mexico, and at an AIDS hospice in Washington, D.C. In 1997, Towey represented Mother Teresa in a dispute with a Tennessee coffee shop that had publicized a coincidental resemblance between her and one of their baked goods (the "nun bun") and had begun to sell merchandise featuring the bun. Recently, Towey defended Mother Teresa in an opinion piece in the National Review, Reject the Smears against Mother Teresa.

On Sept. 6, 2022, Simon & Schuster published Jim Towey’s book, To Love and Be Loved: A Personal Portrait of Mother Teresa. Towey presented the book to Pope Francis at the Vatican the same week. The book received critical acclaim by reviewers such as Father Paul Scalia, George Weigel and others. It was also noted in The New York Times book review.

In September 2022 The Wall Street Journal published Towey’s opinion piece, “Mother Teresa and the ‘Sisters Who Stay,’” which highlighted her religious order’s ongoing work throughout the world in the 25 years since her death.

=== Department of Health and Rehabilitative Services ===
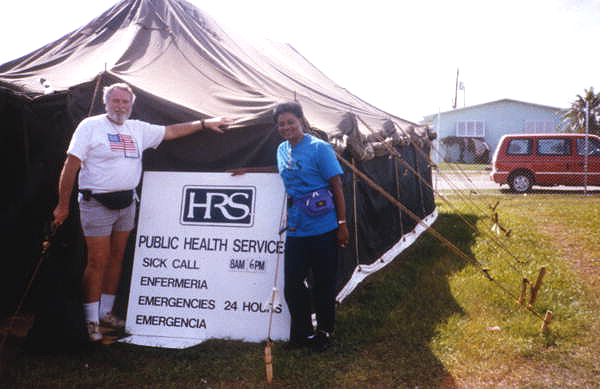
An HRS public health clinic in a tent city housing victims of Hurricane Andrew, photographed in November 1992

Towey reentered the political sphere in 1990 as aide to Lawton Chiles, the newly elected governor of Florida, assisting him as a liaison to religious communities. In December 1991, Chiles made Towey the Miami district administrator of the Florida Department of Health and Rehabilitative Services (HRS). In August 1992, after Hurricane Andrew struck Dade County, Towey oversaw the (at that time) largest mass distribution of food stamps in U.S. history, amounting to over US$81 million in emergency aid. Of the US$25 million in stamps distributed by the HRS within a ten-day period following the storm, he estimated that US$1 million had been received fraudulently.

Chiles appointed Towey HRS Secretary in 1993. During Towey’s 23-month tenure, HRS turned to more community-based decision making; reduced its error rate in food stamp payments; settled a foster care lawsuit; increased adoptions; carried out the nation's first “two-years-and-you're-out” welfare reform program; began ironing out wrinkles in a multimillion-dollar computer system; divested itself of a taxpayer-subsidized golf course at a North Florida mental hospital; and diversified its management team to include more women, Blacks and Hispanics.

Towey was removed from office in 1995 after the Florida State Senate refused to reconfirm his appointment. Towey's ouster, while not unprecedented, was unusual - he was the first governor's appointee since 1975 to be rejected by the senate. His confirmation was rejected as a result of vicious partisan battles. His hearing and ouster were called a “farce” and a “partisan and public defeat.”

=== Aging with Dignity ===
In 1996, Towey established the non-profit organization Aging with Dignity. Together with Kate Callahan, a Miami nurse, and other leading end-of-life experts, he created the original version of the Five Wishes booklet, a combined advance directive and living will. As of 2020, over 35 million copies of Aging with Dignity's booklet have been distributed worldwide by more than 40,000 organizations.

Towey led Aging with Dignity until 2002, when he was named director of the OFBCI. He rejoined the group's board of directors after he left the White House, and has worked for the group as a paid consultant since 2007, in addition to his duties at Saint Vincent College and Ave Maria University.

=== White House Office of Faith-Based and Community Initiatives ===
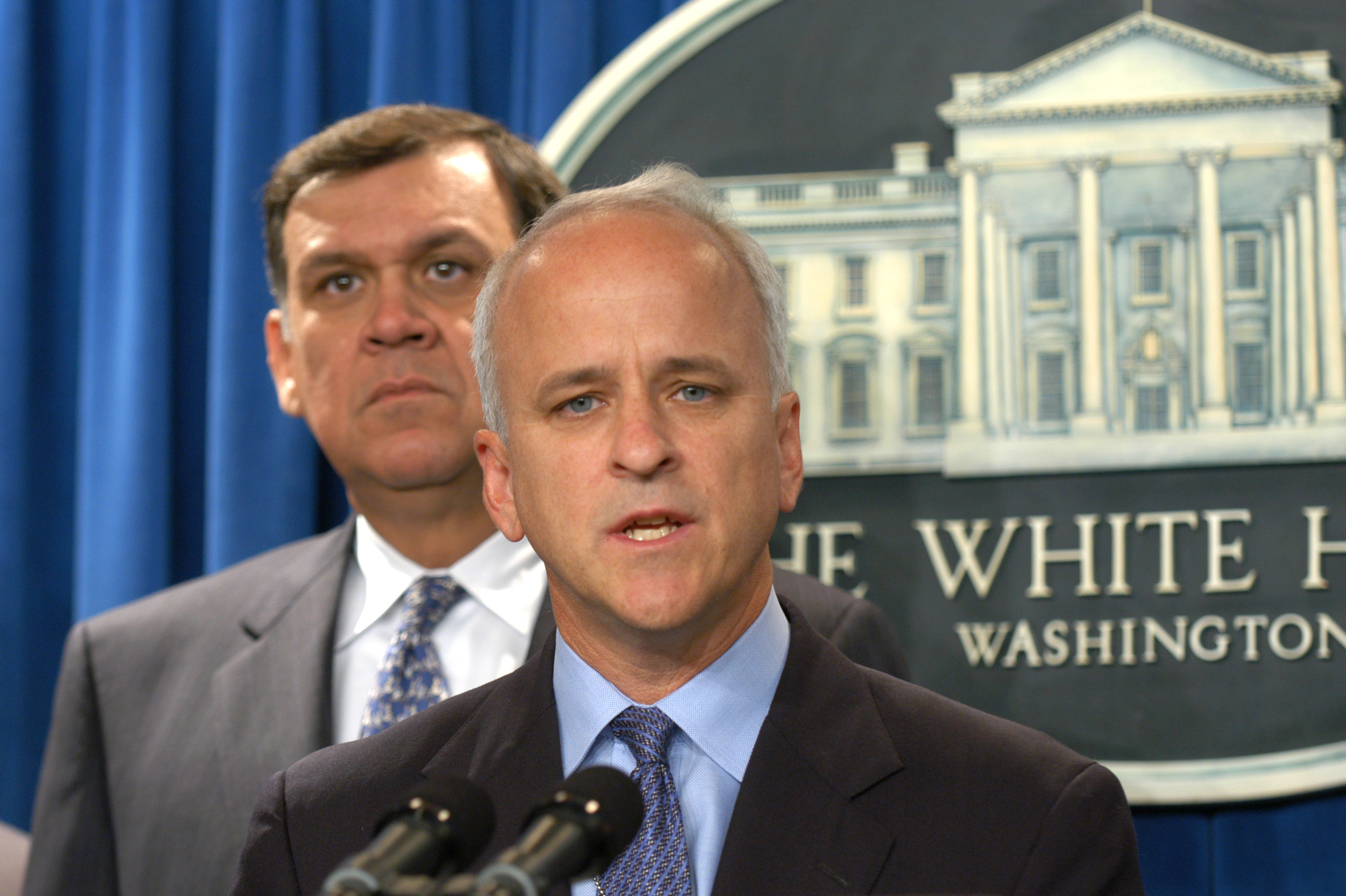
Towey at a White House press conference for faith-based initiatives in 2003

On February 1, 2002, President George W. Bush named Towey the Director of the White House Office of Faith-Based and Community Initiatives. Jeb Bush, the president's brother, was a personal friend of Towey and had recommended him for the office. Towey was initially named Deputy Assistant to the President, a less senior rank than that held by his predecessor at the OFBCI, John J. DiIulio. He reported to John Bridgeland, the director of the USA Freedom Corps. In January 2005, he was promoted to Assistant to the President and began reporting to Bush.

As faith czar (the informal name for Towey's White House position) Towey decried what he termed "militant secularism": the view that religious considerations should be excluded from government affairs and public education. He helped implement 'charitable choice' policies opening federal funding for prison counseling, addiction counseling, mentoring, and other programs to small faith-based non-profit organizations. Towey supported proposed legislation increasing tax incentives for charitable donation and extending the ministerial exemption to faith-based organizations.

In a session of "Ask the Whitehouse" dated November 26, 2003, Towey stated in response to a question about pagan faith-based organizations:

I haven't run into a pagan faith-based group yet, much less a pagan group that cares for the poor! Once you make it clear to any applicant that public money must go to public purposes and can't be used to promote ideology, the fringe groups lose interest. Helping the poor is tough work and only those with loving hearts seem drawn to it.

Pagans criticised Towey for disregarding charitable efforts by pagans and for portraying them as uncompassionate.

=== Saint Vincent College ===
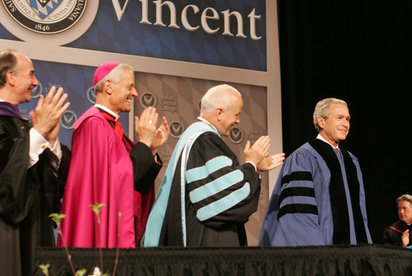
President George W. Bush delivered the 2007 commencement address for Saint Vincent College. Right to left: Bush, Towey, Archbishop Donald Wuerl, and SVC board president J. Christopher Donahue.

Towey became the sixteenth President of Saint Vincent College, a small Catholic college in Latrobe, Pennsylvania, on July 1, 2006. Under Towey, Saint Vincent College made the Young America's Foundation list of top ten conservative colleges in the United States for the first time in 2007. The school had previously received honorable mention on the list. Towey was a member of the National Advisory Committee on Institutional Quality and Integrity, an accreditation advisory body for the Department of Education, between 2007 and 2008. He was one of the initial signatories to the 2009 Manhattan Declaration, a religious-freedom manifesto.

Towey's relationship with faculty members at Saint Vincent was strained and often contentious. Some believed him to be exerting undue influence over matters such as hiring or the college's 2007 reaccreditation process. In February 2008, nearly three quarters of the tenured faculty signed a letter of concern to the college's board of directors regarding Towey, stating that he had shown "systematic and pervasive disregard for collegiality and shared governance" and had "brought about an unparalleled crisis". Towey attributed the dissension to a clash of cultures with a predominantly Benedictine faculty unaccustomed to rapid change, and to the fact that he was "new to academia". An additional source of conflict during his tenure at Saint Vincent College was derived from a lawsuit between key officials of the university and a Monk and member of the staff at the time, Father Mark Gruber. Gruber was a key leader of dissent against the Towey administration, as he accused the arch abbot and Towey of damaging his good name. However, in 2012, the Catholic Church officials confirmed that "Gruber has been found guilty of the delicts (canonical crimes) of possession of child pornography; production of materials which gravely injure good morals; abuse of the Sacrament of Confession (but not a violation of the sacramental seal); and defamation of a legitimate superior." In July 2013 he was relieved of his monastic and priestly duties.

Towey stepped down as president on June 30, 2010, one year before his contract ended. In the interval between his departure from Saint Vincent and his hiring by Ave Maria University in 2011, Towey worked as a consultant for Aging with Dignity and the Papal Foundation.

=== Ave Maria University ===
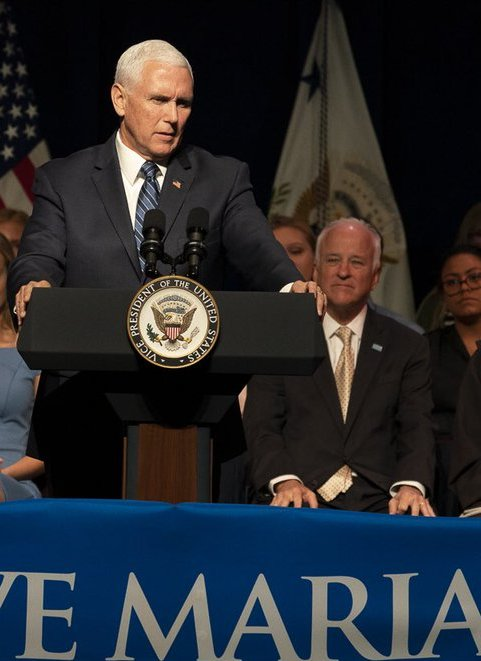
Towey watches Mike Pence deliver a speech at AMU in 2019

Towey assumed the role of President of Ave Maria University from Nicholas Healy on July 1, 2011.

In 2013, Ave Maria University launched the Mother Teresa Project, a program for students to learn about the life of Teresa and participate in charitable works and mission trips. Towey obtained the approval of the Missionaries of Charity through his previous association with their founder. In 2014, the university opened a Mother Teresa museum featuring her letters and possessions, and storyboards with photos from her life.

As President of Ave Maria University, Towey had great quantifiable success. According to then chairman of the Board Michael Timmis, Towey increased undergrad enrollment by 70%, raised over 80 million dollars, added 24 majors to the university, and he successfully reattained accreditation through 2025. It is noteworthy that upon Towey's arrival, he cut the budget by 3.6 million dollars to keep the school afloat, and went on to earn an investment grade credit rating with a "stable outlook by Standard and Poor's.

In 2016, Towey was sued for alleged involvement in manipulating the funds of Rhodora J. Donahue Academy of Ave Maria, a private K–12 school affiliated at the time with AMU. Shortly before Towey's scheduled deposition in 2017, AMU agreed to sell Donahue to the Diocese of Venice for US$1 million—less than one fifth of the school building's appraised value—and the lawsuit was withdrawn. These accusations were never substantiated in a court of law.

In 2018, Towey was sued for breach of contract by a former AMU professor who alleged that he had been fired for reporting sexual harassment of his colleagues by another AMU employee. This lawsuit was later withdrawn.

On October 9, 2018, Towey announced that he would step down as President of Ave Maria on June 30, 2020.

==== Response to the Viganò letter ====
On August 29, 2018, Towey issued a statement in response to Archbishop Carlo Maria Viganò's August 25 letter. Viganò had accused Pope Francis and other members of the hierarchy of the Catholic Church of having known of then-cardinal Theodore McCarrick's alleged sexual misconduct. Viganò wrote that Francis' predecessor, Pope Benedict XVI, had imposed sanctions on McCarrick but Francis had not enforced them. In his response, Towey characterized the Viganò allegations as baseless, calculated to harm the reputation of the pope, and founded upon a flawed understanding of religious conservatism:

There is nothing new about the rift between Pope Francis and some conservative members of the Church hierarchy. ... The release of the Archbishop’s manifesto seemed timed to inflict the maximum damage possible to the Pope’s credibility, and the choreographed chorus of support by others in league with them, was just as troubling. Contrary to the popular narrative, most conservative Catholics are not following suit and embracing their defiance, and certainly not on our campus. ... Those so-called conservative Catholics who now challenge the Holy Father’s legitimate authority and openly undermine his papacy, are betraying their own principles and hurting the Church they profess to love. They should stop now.

Towey's remarks met with a swift backlash from Ave Maria University alumni and from other Catholics, some of whom interpreted the statement as dismissive of the victims of the alleged sexual abuse. The Cardinal Newman Society responded that Towey "unfairly attacks credible, faithful Catholic leaders ... There are serious scandals that can no longer be ignored." On August 30, Towey revised the statement, removing an allegation that Cardinal Raymond Burke's support for the Viganò letter was motivated by Burke's frustrated career ambitions, and issued a second statement reiterating his opposition to public criticism of the pope.

=== After AMU ===
In 2016, Towey appeared in a video advertisement for the Florida congressional candidate Francis Rooney, stating, "Mother Teresa always spoke very eloquently about the sanctity of life. ... Francis Rooney's one of those people that's going to give voice to those same values that Mother Teresa espoused". In April 2020, he sent a cease and desist letter to Chuck Dietzen, an Indiana congressional candidate whose campaign video featured a photograph of Dietzen working with Teresa. Towey wrote, "During her lifetime, Mother Teresa strictly prohibited any political use of her name, image or likeness, or any other representations that sought to associate her with any political cause or campaign".

Dietzen's lawyer, Jim Bopp, was planning on complying until he learned that Towey had also sent the letter to the press. He asked Towey to provide proof that he represented the Missionaries of Charity, a list of recipients of the letter, and information about whether the Dietzen photo was copyrighted. Towey told Bopp he wouldn't do so. (A regional superior of the order told The Indianapolis Star that Towey did have power of attorney.) The following week, Bopp learned of Towey's participation in the Rooney ad. He called it "hypocrisy". Towey said that mentioning Teresa in the Rooney ad was "an error in judgment" which he regretted.

After AMU, Towey returned to Aging with Dignity as the CEO of the non-for-profit he established in 1996. Upon his return, he founded a new Washington D.C. office, and has published an opinion piece in the Washington Post.

In Oct. 2022, the National Review also published an article by Towey that highlighted his support for improved end-of-life care and his fervent opposition to the spread of physician-assisted suicide. The article, titled “MAID in Canada: The Right to Die,” detailed the dangerous, slippery slope that Canada has embarked upon in expanding the right to assisted suicide to the mentally ill and minors.

== Awards and recognition ==
- 2000 – Pro Ecclesia et Pontifice Papal Cross

== References and sources ==
=== Sources ===
- Black, Amy E. (2004). Of Little Faith: The Politics of George W. Bush's Faith-Based Initiatives. Georgetown University Press. p. 217. ISBN 978-1589013827.
- Black, Amy E.; Koopman, Douglas L. (August 20, 2007). "Politics of Faith-Based Initiatives". In Rozell, Mark J.; Whitney, Gleaves (eds.). Religion and the Bush Presidency. Springer. ISBN 9780230607354.
- Fendall, Lon (2008). Stand Alone Or Come Home: Mark Hatfield as an Evangelical and a Progressive. Barclay Press. ISBN 9781594980152.
- Kuo, David (2006). Tempting Faith: An Inside Story of Political Seduction. Simon and Schuster. ISBN 9781416542384.
- Solomon, Lewis D. (2003). In God We Trust?: Faith-based Organizations and the Quest to Solve America's Social Ills. Lexington Books. ISBN 9780739106303.
- Thompson, Larry Clinton (2010). Refugee Workers in the Indochina Exodus, 1975–1982. McFarland. ISBN 9780786455904.

Political offices
Preceded by John DiIulio	Director of the White House Office of Faith-Based and Community Initiatives; 2002–2006	Succeeded by Jay Hein
Academic offices
Preceded by James Will	President of Saint Vincent College; 2006–2010	Succeeded by Norman Hipps
Preceded by Nicholas Healy	President of Ave Maria University; 2011–2019	Succeeded by Christopher Ice
