= Advance healthcare directive =

Legal document

An advance healthcare directive, also known as living will, personal directive, advance directive, medical directive or advance decision, is a document in which a person specifies what actions should be taken for their health if they are no longer able to make decisions for themselves because of illness or incapacity. In the U.S. it has a legal status in itself, whereas in some countries it is legally persuasive without being a legal document.

A living will is one form of advance directive, leaving instructions for treatment. Another form is a specific type of power of attorney or health care proxy, in which the person authorizes someone (an agent) to make decisions on their behalf when they are incapacitated. People are often encouraged to complete both documents to provide comprehensive guidance regarding their care, although they may be combined into a single form. An example of combination documents includes the Five Wishes in the United States. The term living will is also the commonly recognised vernacular in many countries, especially the U.K. The legality of advance consent for advance healthcare directives depends on jurisdiction.

== Background ==
Advance directives were created in response to the increasing sophistication and prevalence of medical technology. Numerous studies have documented critical deficits in the medical care of the dying; it has been found to be unnecessarily prolonged, painful, expensive, and emotionally burdensome to both patients and their families.

== Living will ==
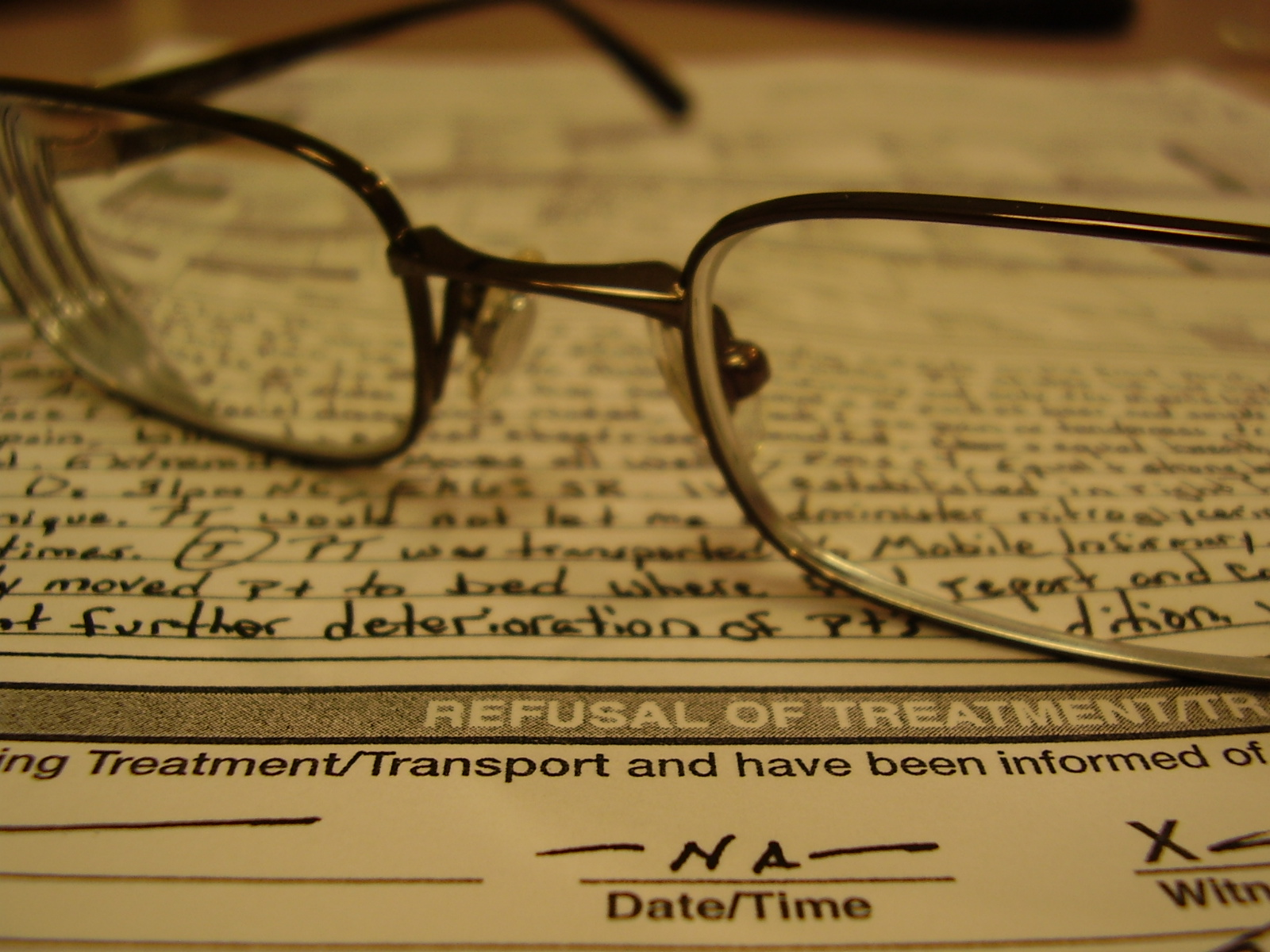
Refusal of treatment form

The living will is the oldest form of advance directive. It was first proposed by an Illinois attorney, Luis Kutner, in a speech to the Euthanasia Society of America in 1967 and published in a law journal in 1969. Kutner drew from existing estate law, by which an individual can control property affairs after death (i.e., when no longer available to speak for himself or herself) and devised a way for an individual to express their health care desires when no longer able to express current healthcare wishes. Because this form of "will" was to be used while an individual was still alive (but no longer able to make decisions), it was dubbed the "living will". The U.S. Patient Self-Determination Act (PSDA) went into effect in December 1991 and required healthcare providers (primarily hospitals, nursing homes, and home health agencies) to give patients information about their rights to make advance directives under state law.

A living will usually provides specific directives about the course of treatment healthcare providers and caregivers are to follow. In some cases a living will may forbid the use of various kinds of burdensome medical treatment. It may also be used to express wishes about the use or foregoing of food and water, if supplied via tubes or other medical devices. The living will is used only if the individual has become unable to give informed consent or refusal due to incapacity. A living will can be very specific or very general. An example of a statement sometimes found in a living will is: "If I suffer an incurable, irreversible illness, disease, or condition and my attending physician determines that my condition is terminal, I direct that life-sustaining measures that would serve only to prolong my dying be withheld or discontinued."

More specific living wills may include information regarding an individual's desire for such services such as analgesia (pain relief), antibiotics, hydration, feeding, and the use of ventilators or cardiopulmonary resuscitation. However, studies have also shown that adults are more likely to complete these documents if they are written in everyday language and less focused on technical treatments.

However, by the late 1980s, public advocacy groups became aware that many people remained unaware of advance directives and even fewer actually completed them. In part, this was seen as a failure of health care providers and medical organizations to promote and support the use of these documents. The public's response was to press for further legislative support. The most recent result was the Patient Self-Determination Act of 1990, which attempted to address this awareness problem by requiring health care institutions to better promote and support the use of advance directives.

Living wills proved to be very popular, and by 2007, 41% of Americans had completed a living will. In response to public needs, state legislatures soon passed laws in support of living wills in virtually every state in the union.

However, as living wills began to be better recognized, key deficits were soon discovered. Most living wills tended to be limited in scope and often failed to fully address presenting problems and needs. Further, many individuals wrote out their wishes in ways that might conflict with quality medical practice. Ultimately, it was determined that a living will alone might be insufficient to address many important health care decisions. This led to the development of what some have called "second generation" advance directives – the "health care proxy appointment" or "medical power of attorney".

== Healthcare proxy ==
Power of attorney statutes have existed in the United States since the days of "common law" (i.e., laws brought from England to the United States during the colonial period). These early powers of attorney allowed an individual to name someone to act in their stead. Drawing upon these laws, "durable powers of attorney for health care" and "healthcare proxy appointment" documents were created and codified in law, allowing an individual to appoint someone to make healthcare decisions in their behalf if they should ever be rendered incapable of making their wishes known. People will normally benefit from having both a durable power of attorney and a healthcare proxy.

A healthcare proxy document appoints a person, the proxy, who can make decisions on behalf of the granting individual in the event of incapacity. The appointed healthcare proxy has, in essence, the same rights to request or refuse treatment that the individual would have if still capable of making and communicating health care decisions. The appointed representative is authorized to make real-time decisions in actual circumstances, as opposed to advance decisions framed in hypothetical situations, as might be recorded in a living will. The healthcare proxy was rapidly accepted within the U.S. and authorizing legislation was soon enacted in most states.

One problem with a conventional healthcare proxy is that it may not be possible for the appointed proxy to determine what care choices the individual would have made if still capable, as healthcare proxies may be too vague for meaningful interpretation. While a study comparing next-of-kin decisions on behalf of an incapacitated person, (who later recovered) found that these surrogates chose correctly 68% of the time overall.

=== Values-based directives ===
One alternative to a conventional healthcare proxy is the values history, a "two-part advance directive instrument that elicits patient values about terminal medical care and therapy-specific directives". The goal of this advance directive is to move away from a focus on specific treatments and medical procedures to a focus on patient values and personal goals. Studies suggest that values regarding financial and psychological burden are strong motivators in not wanting a broad array of end-of-life therapies.

Another alternative to a conventional healthcare proxy is the medical directive, a document that describes six case scenarios for advance medical decision-making. The scenarios are each associated with a roster of commonly considered medical procedures and interventions, allowing the individual to decide in advance which treatments are wanted or not wanted under the circumstances.

A study conducted to address concerns that a non-statutory advance directive might leave an incapacitated person with a document that may not be honored found that they are generally accepted.

=== Psychiatric advance directives ===
A psychiatric advance directive (PAD), also known as a mental health advance directive, is a written document that describes what a person wants to happen if at some time in the future they are judged to have a mental disorder in such a way that they are deemed unable to decide for themselves or to communicate effectively.

A PAD can inform others about what treatment they want or do not want from psychiatrists or other mental health professionals, and it can identify a person to whom they have given the authority to make decisions on their behalf. A mental health advance directive is one kind of advance health care directive.

==== Legal foundations ====
Psychiatric advance directives are legal documents used by persons currently enjoying legal capacity to declare their preferences and instructions for future mental health treatment, or to appoint a surrogate decision maker through Health Care Power of Attorney (HCPA), in advance of being targeted by coercive mental health laws, during which they may be stripped of legal capacity to make decisions.

In the United States, although 25 states have now passed legislation in the past decade establishing authority for PADs, there is relatively little public information available to address growing interest in these legal documents. The Joint Commission on the Accreditation of Healthcare Organizations (JCAHO) requires behavioral health facilities to ask patients if they have PADs.

==== Clinical benefits ====
A NIH-funded study conducted by researchers at Duke University has shown that creating a PAD with a trained facilitator increases therapeutic alliance with clinicians, enhances involuntary patients' treatment satisfaction and perceived autonomy, and improves treatment decision-making capacity among people labeled with severe mental illness.

PADs also provide a transportable document—increasingly accessible through electronic directories—to convey information about a detainee's treatment history, including medical disorders, emergency contact information, and medication side effects. Clinicians often have limited information about citizens detained and labeled as psychiatric patients who present or are coercively presented and labeled as in crisis. A PAD may help clinicians gain prompt access to relevant information about individual cases and thus improve the quality of clinical decision-making, and enhance patient safety and long-term autonomy.

==== Barriers ====
National surveys in the United States indicate that although approximately 70% of people targeted by coercive psychiatry laws would want a PAD if offered assistance in completing one, less than 10% have actually completed a PAD.

In a survey conducted of 600 psychiatrists, psychologists, and social workers showed that the vast majority thought advance care planning for crises would help improve patients' overall mental health care. Further, the more clinicians knew about PAD laws, the more favorable were their attitudes toward these practices. For instance, while most psychiatrists, social workers, and psychologists surveyed believed PADs would be helpful to people detained and targeted for forced drugging and electroshock when labeled with severe mental illnesses, clinicians with more legal knowledge about PAD laws were more likely to endorse PADs as a beneficial part of patients' treatment planning.

Many clinicians reported not knowing enough about how PADs work and specifically indicated they lacked resources to readily help patients fill out PADs or to help their clients develop crisis plans.

== Worldwide ==
=== Australia ===
The laws regarding advance directives, powers of attorney, and enduring guardianships vary from state to state. In Queensland, for example, the concept of an advance health directive is defined in the Powers of attorney act of 1998 and Guardianship and Administration act of 2000. Tasmania has no specific legislation concerning advance healthcare directives. Advance Care Planning (ACP) has been gaining prominence in Australia for its role in enhancing a patient's autonomy and as an important component of good end-of-life care.

=== Canada ===
Health Canada – Canada's federal health agency – has acknowledged the need for a greater investment in palliative and hospice care as the country faces a rapidly growing population of elderly and terminally ill citizens.

Canada has focused on advance care planning that involves encouraging individuals to reflect on and express their wishes for future care, including end-of-life care, before they become terminally ill or incapable of making decisions for themselves. A number of publicly funded initiatives exist to promote advance care planning and to encourage people to appoint "substitute decision makers" who make medical decisions and can give or withhold consent for medical procedures according to the patient's pre-expressed wishes when the patient becomes incapable of doing so themselves.

In 2008, The Advance Care Planning in Canada: A National Framework and Implementation Project was founded. The goal was to engage healthcare professionals and educate patients about the importance of advance care planning and end of life care.

Polling indicates that 96% of Canadians think that having a conversation with a loved one about planning for the end of life is important. However, the same polls show that only about 13% have actually done so, or have created an advance care plan for themselves.

A 2014 Ipsos Reid Survey reveals that only about a third of Canadian doctors and nurses working in primary care feel comfortable discussing end of life issues with their patients. End-of-life issues in Canada have recently been highlighted due to the ongoing related debate about physician-assisted death in Canada. Former Federal Health Minister Rona Ambrose (July 15, 2013 to November 4, 2015) has stated: "I think the starting point for me is that we still don't have the best elderly care and palliative care yet ... So let's talk about making sure we have the best end-of-life care before we start talking about assisted suicide and euthanasia."

=== UK ===
In the UK, emergency care and treatment plans (e.g. ReSPECT) are clinical recommendations written by healthcare professionals after discussion with patients or their relatives about their priorities of care. Research has found that the involvement of patients or their family in forming ECTP (emergency care and treatment plan) recommendations is variable. In some situations (where there are limited treatment options available, or where the patient is likely to deteriorate quickly) healthcare professionals will not explore the patient's preferences, but will instead ensure that patients or their relatives understand what treatment will or will not be offered.

==== England and Wales ====
In England and Wales, people may make an advance directive or appoint a proxy under the Mental Capacity Act 2005. This is only for an advance refusal of treatment for when the person lacks mental capacity; to be legally binding, the advance decision must be specific about the treatment that is being refused and the circumstances in which the refusal will apply. To be valid, the person must have been competent and must have understood the decision when they signed the directive. Where the patient's advance decision relates to a refusal of life-prolonging treatment this must be recorded in writing and witnessed. Any advance refusal is legally binding providing that the patient is an adult, the patient was competent and properly informed when reaching the decision, it is clearly applicable to the present circumstances and there is no reason to believe that the patient has changed their mind. If an advance decision does not meet these criteria but appears to set out a clear indication of the patient's wishes, it will not be legally binding but should be taken into consideration in determining the patient's best interests. In June 2010, the Wealth Management Solicitors, Moore Blatch, announced that research showed demand for Living Wills had trebled in the two years previous, indicating the rising level of people concerned about the way in which their terminal illness will be managed. According to the British Government, every adult with mental capacity has the right to agree to or refuse medical treatment. To make their advance wishes clear, people can use a living will, which can include general statements about wishes, which are not legally binding, and specific refusals of treatment called "advance decisions" or "advance directives".

=== European Union ===
Country reports on advance directives is a 2008 paper summarizing advance health care legislation on each country in the European Union with a shorter summary for the U.S.; a 2009 paper also provides a European overview.

==== Germany ====
On 18 June 2009 the Bundestag passed a law on advance directives, applicable since 1 September 2009. Such law, based on the principle of the right of self-determination, provides for the assistance of a fiduciary and of the physician.

==== Italy ====
On 14 December 2017, Italian Senate officially approved a law on advance healthcare directive that came into force on 31 January 2018.

Controversy over end-of-life care emerged in Italy in 2006, when a terminally ill patient suffering from muscular dystrophy, Piergiorgio Welby, petitioned the courts for removal of his respirator. Debated in Parliament, no decision was reached. A doctor eventually honored Welby's wishes by removing the respirator under sedation. The physician was initially charged for violating Italy's laws against euthanasia, but was later cleared. Further debate ensued after the father of a 38-year-old woman, Eluana Englaro, petitioned the courts for permission to withdraw feeding tubes to allow her to die. Englaro had been in a coma for 17 years, following a car accident. After petitioning the courts for 10 years, authorization was granted and Englaro died in February 2009. In May 2008, apparently as a result of the recent Court of Cassation's holding in the case of Englaro, a guardianship judge in Modena, Italy used relatively new legislation to work around the lack of the advance directive legislation. The new law permitted a judicially appointed guardian ("amministratore di sostegno") to make decisions for an individual. Faced with a 70-year-old woman with end-stage Lou Gehrig's Disease who was petitioning the court (with the support of her family) to prevent any later use of a respirator, the judge appointed her husband as guardian with the specific duty to refuse any tracheotomy and/or respirator use if/when the patient became unable to refuse such treatment herself.

=== Japan ===
Advance healthcare directives are not legally recognized in Japan. According to a 2017 survey by the Ministry of Health, Labor and Welfare (MHLW), 66% of surveyed individuals supported the idea of such directives, but only 8.1% had prepared their own. The private organization Nihon Songenshi Kyōkai (Japan Society for Dying with Dignity) offers members a semi-standardized "living will" (ribingu uiru) form that is registered with the organization, though it holds no legal weight.

=== Korea ===
Advance healthcare directives are legally recognized in Korea since 2016, when the Act on Decisions on Life-Sustaining Treatment for Patients in Hospice and Palliative Care was implemented in Korea, providing a broad framework for end-of-life decision-making.

=== Nigeria ===
Advance healthcare directives is yet to be legalised in Nigeria, and patient's "written directives" for determining their preferences, tradition still dominates in Nigeria and most African countries.

=== Israel ===
In 2005, the Knesset passed a law allowing people to write advance care directives. Right to refuse care is only recognized if the patient is considered terminally ill and their life expectancy is less than six months.

=== Switzerland ===
In Switzerland, there are several organizations that take care of registering patient decrees, forms that are signed by the patients declaring that in case of permanent loss of judgement (e.g., inability to communicate or severe brain damage) all means of prolonging life shall be stopped. Family members and these organizations also keep proxies that entitle their holder to enforce such patient decrees. Establishing such decrees is relatively uncomplicated.

In 2013 a law concerning advance healthcare directives has been voted. Every adult with testamentary capacity can redact a legal binding document declaring a will in the event of loss of judgement. They may also designate a natural person to discuss medical procedures with the attending doctor and make decisions on their behalf if they are longer capable of judgment.

=== United States ===
Aggressive medical intervention leaves nearly two million Americans confined to nursing homes, and over 1.4 million Americans remain so medically frail as to survive only through the use of feeding tubes. Of U.S. deaths, about a third occur in health care facilities. As many as 30,000 persons are kept alive in comatose and permanently vegetative states.

Cost burdens to individuals and families are considerable. A national study found that: "In 20% of cases, a family member had to quit work", 31% lost "all or most savings" (even though 96% had insurance), and "20% reported loss of [their] major source of income". Yet, studies indicate that 70-95% of people would rather refuse aggressive medical treatment than have their lives medically prolonged in incompetent or other poor prognosis states.

As more and more Americans experienced the burdens and diminishing benefits of invasive and aggressive medical treatment in poor prognosis states – either directly (themselves) or through a loved one – pressure began to mount to devise ways to avoid the suffering and costs associated with treatments one did not want in personally untenable situations. The first formal response was the living will.

In the United States, all states recognize some form of living wills or the designation of a health care proxy. The term living will is not officially recognized under California law, but an advance health care directive or durable power of attorney may be used for the same purpose as a living will.

In Pennsylvania on November 30, 2006, Governor Edward Rendell signed into law Act 169, that provides a comprehensive statutory framework governing advance health care directives and health care decision-making for incompetent patients. As a result, health care organizations make available a "Combined Living Will & Health Care Power of Attorney Example Form from Pennsylvania Act 169 of 2006".

Several states offer living will "registries" where citizens can file their living will so that they are more easily and readily accessible by doctors and other health care providers. However, in recent years some of these registries, such as the one run by the Washington State Department of Health, have been shuttered by the state government because of low enrollment, lack of funds, or both.

On July 28, 2009, Barack Obama became the first United States President to announce publicly that he had a living will, and to encourage others to do the same. He told an AARP town meeting, "So I actually think it's a good idea to have a living will. I'd encourage everybody to get one. I have one; Michelle has one. And we hope we don't have to use it for a long time, but I think it's something that is sensible." The announcement followed controversy surrounding proposed health care legislation that included language that would permit the payment of doctors under Medicare to counsel patients regarding living wills, sometimes referred to as the "infamous" page 425. Shortly afterwards, bioethicist Jacob Appel issued a call to make living wills mandatory.

=== India ===
Supreme Court of India on March 9, 2018, permitted living wills and withholding and withdrawing life sustaining treatments. The country's apex court held that the right to a dignified life extends up to the point of having a dignified death.

== See also ==
- Do not resuscitate
- Engage with Grace
- My body, my choice
- Ordinary and extraordinary care
- Futile medical care
