= Remittances from the United States =

International money transfers made by migrant workers and immigrants

International money transfers made by migrant workers and immigrants sending a portion of their earnings to their families in their country of origin are known as remittances. Remittances are an important aspect of the global economy, totaling an estimated $601 billion (USD) for the year 2015. The United States is currently the largest source of international remittances in the world, sending a total of $148 billion in 2017. Mexico received the largest portion of these remittances, accounting for more than US$30 billion. making the U.S.-Mexico remittance corridor one of the largest in the world. With the exception of the 2008 financial crisis, remittances sent from the U.S. have been consistently climbing for the past half century. This major increase in remittances can be partially attributed to the larger population of immigrants and migrant workers, as well as to increasing globalization in the financial and money markets. China and India are also major recipients of U.S. remittances, and are the top two recipients of remittances globally.

Top Recipients of U.S. Remittances 2015 (In Billions of US$)
Country	Remittances	GDP of recipient country (nominal)	% of GDP of recipient country (nominal) supplied by remittances
Mexico	25.2	1,143.79	2.2%
China	16.3	11,064.66	0.14%
India	11.5	2,088.84	0.53%
Philippines	10.1	291.96	3.46%
Vietnam	7	193.6	3.62%
Guatemala	5.8	63.79	9.09%
Nigeria	5.7	481.06	1.18%
El Salvador	4	25.85	15.47%
Dominican Republic	3.7	67.10	5.51%
Honduras	3.3	20.15	16.38%

== Methods used ==
The methods used to transfer any amount of money across international borders can be broken into two broad categories, formal channels, and informal channels. A formal remittance channel is an authorized and legal method of sending money across borders and is usually facilitated by a financial institution at either end of the transaction. Common types of formal transactions include the use of credit cards, cash transfers, account-to-account transfers, and prepaid funds. Wire transfers are the preferred method within the banking industry, as they allow for nearly instantaneous transfer within a secure network of financial institutions. Informal methods of transfer are just about any money transfer system that does not involve a traditional bank. This can range from using a smaller unlicensed Money Transfer Operator (MTO) to the sending of physical money in the mail, or through a friend or family member. Informal methods of transfer have been historically the most popular methods for immigrants and workers to send money to their families back home. Accessibility, Cost, and Speed are some of the major factors that contribute to their popularity.

The use of formal methods by individual immigrants and workers in the U.S. has been increasing over the last decade, this can be attributed partially to a sharp decline in the average cost of formal money transfer systems, brought about by increased competition as more and more companies now offer their own international money transfer services. Another factor that has increased the use of formal methods has been the scrutiny which informal money transfers have come under. Since the September 11th terrorist attacks, Informal money transfer systems are believed the primary methods that terrorist organizations, or drug cartels receive funding from supporters in wealthier countries. New regulations included in the Dodd-Frank act, have also played a key role in maintaining a higher standard of accountability and reliability of service for licensed MTOs which has further increased their popularity.

=== Remittance providers ===
The remittance market has been growing steadily for decades. Yet despite the growing demand, larger traditional banking institutions have been reluctant to offer competitive remittance services. Remittance services of banking institutions likely account for less than 5-10% of U.S.- Latin America money transfers. Despite Large profit margins, the money transfer systems of banks were set up with large sums of money in mind, making small remittance transfers of only a few hundred dollars or less relatively inefficient and undesirable. Because of this, many banks remittance services are offered only as an afterthought, with very few offering rates at competitive levels.

Where American banks have fallen short, MTOs have emerged. With an 8% average growth rate in recent years, it comes as no surprise that a variety of companies have sprung up in order to meet the needs of a growing population of immigrants looking to send money home. Among these, Western Union still stands as the dominant remittance service provider in the United States. Globally nearly 1 in every $5 being sent across borders went through Western Union in 2011, which amounted to nearly $80 billion. Although Western Union is the largest of the remittance focused companies, they certainly aren't the only one. MoneyGram is likely its next largest global competitor with around $20 billion in transfers handled each year. These companies are able to earn extremely high-profit margins on their relatively inexpensive services. Western Union's profit margins have been known to be as high as 28% in years past. The profitability of the remittance market, along with the growth of Electronic Funds Transfer technologies has also led to the creation of numerous internet based remittance companies such as XOOM and Remitly. Alternative digital business models were deployed by RegaloCard and Priver providing free and instant transfers via mobile

== Latin America ==
=== Mexico ===
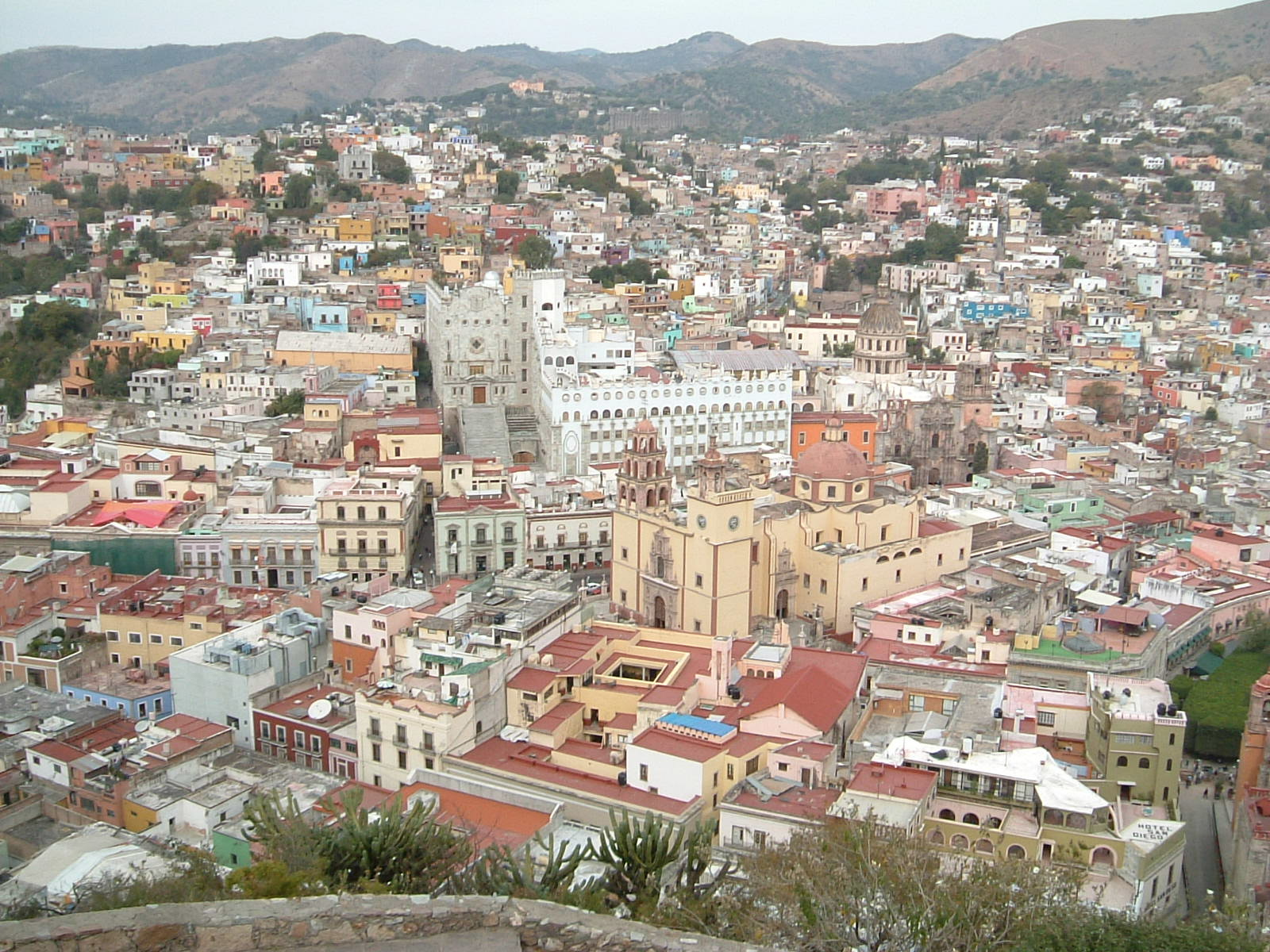
Guanajuato A city in central Mexico

Mexico is the third largest remittance receiving country in the world, with a total of $25.7 billion received in 2015. The vast majority of these remittances come from the U.S. In all, only $500 million of the $25.7 billion in remittances came from sources other than the United States. Mexico's GDP in 2015 was an estimated 1.14 trillion U.S. Dollars. Although remittance to Mexico has grown considerably in the past decade, a large portion of that growth may have been due to immigrants switching from informal to formal channels of remittance. The acceptance and use of formal channels of remittance has been a major development in recent decades, spurred on by the support of both the Mexican and American governments.

In 2001 the U.S.-Mexico partnership for prosperity was launched as a private-public venture with the goal of promoting economic development in Mexico's poorer regions. One of the primary methods used to achieve this desired development was by using remittances. The project sought to better utilize remittances as a source for economic investment by first reducing the cost of formal remittance services, as well as increasing the availability of integrated financial services in the poorer regions of Mexico. After this initiative, the average cost of sending decreased dramatically. In most cases, the cost of sending $300 to Mexico decreased by as much as 50% or more. Since the 1990s the advancement of technology and increased competition in the MTO market have both had a major impact on the costs of Mexican remittance.

==== Economic impacts ====
In Mexico, remittances have facilitated a number of benefits for the Mexican economy and infrastructure. Because of the relatively high demand for remittance services, many banks are able to offer remittance services as a secondary profit source. While the profits from remittance services are typically less than those of a bank's more traditional services, they have allowed the banks the opportunity to encourage remittance recipients to open savings accounts and to keep a portion of their remittances at the institution. This is incredibly important, as an inflow of remittance capital does not necessarily improve the economic environment of the region the money is sent to, since most of the money is spent on consumable goods and day to day expenses. This type of spending has a slight impact on demand, but has little effect on overall investment and infrastructure development. Another way Mexican communities have benefited from remittances is through the use of hometown associations (HTAs). An HTA is a community of Mexican immigrants who pool their resources in an effort to improve their communities of origin back in Mexico. They do this most often by hosting community events in order to raise money for public works and social projects in their hometowns.

=== Honduras ===
In 2008 Honduras received US$2.8 billion in remittances. This accounted for over 20% of their GDP that year. 91.4% of Honduran remittances were sent from Hondurans in the United States. In 2014 International remittances to Honduras accounted for 17.4% of their GDP. in 2015 Honduras received $3.3 billion from the United States alone, accounting for 16.4% of their total GDP that year. In 2014 no other South American country received a higher percentage of their GDP in remittances than Honduras.

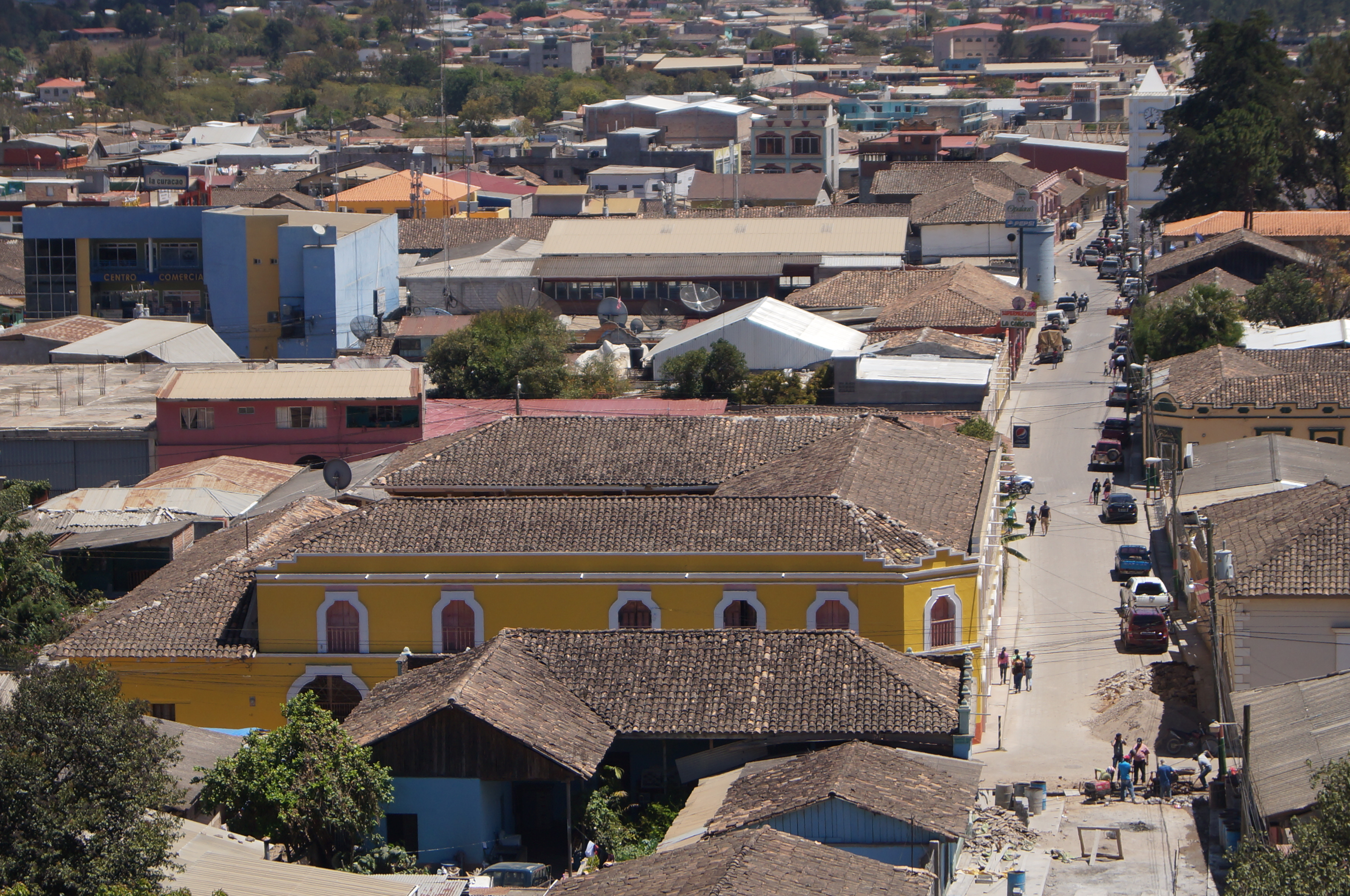
La Esperanza

Remittances in Honduras are primarily used for basic living expenses at the household level. Within the country, remittances are the third largest source of income for households. Remittances also play a secondary role of bringing a level investment back into small capital starved communities. Returning Honduran migrants often contribute to community development through their investments in the local private sector. In the town of La Esperanza, returning migrants finance 11% of businesses development.

Within Honduras, remittance services are largely provided by banks as well as local micro-finance institutions. In the U.S. most Honduran migrants do not have the proper legal U.S. documentation such as valid U.S. entry visas or social security numbers. Many of these migrants were also too young when the left Honduras to hold any official Honduran identification. This makes their financial inclusion into the U.S. banking system difficult. Because of this, they typically rely on non-banking institutions, such as MTOs (money transfer operators) to provide them with the remittance services they need. Due to convenience and low cost, formal remittance channels have become the primary method Honduran immigrants use to send remittances back to their families. About 92% of Honduran remittances are sent through the formal system of regulated MTOs.

==== Economic impacts ====
Remittances from the U.S. play a major role in the Honduran economy. The massive inflow of capital has presented Honduras with the ability to improve its financial sector and increase its inclusion of the poor. Inclusion into financial system gives many of the poor access to financial services that they would have otherwise been unable to obtain. These services include savings accounts, credits, and insurance products. Empirical studies have repeatedly shown that high financial inclusion rates have a strong positive impact on economic growth. Most Honduran financial institutions are attempting to increase inclusion rates by using the remittance receivers as a gateway toward financial inclusion. Despite growing networks and financial inclusion, availability of remittance services in the rural regions of Honduras remains limited and in need of expansion.

=== Guatemala ===
In 2001 remittances to Guatemala were an estimated $500 million, which was equivalent to roughly 3% of their GDP. By 2005 remittances had grown to nearly $3 billion, and accounted for almost 10% Guatemala's GDP. This apparent jump in remittances may be partly explained by the World Bank Implementing more accurate methods of measurement, as well as Guatemalan migrants increasingly switching over to formal remittance channels following tighter remittance regulations imposed by the U.S. government. In 2015 U.S. Remittances to Guatemala totaled $5.8 billion, still accounting for almost 10% of their GDP for that year.

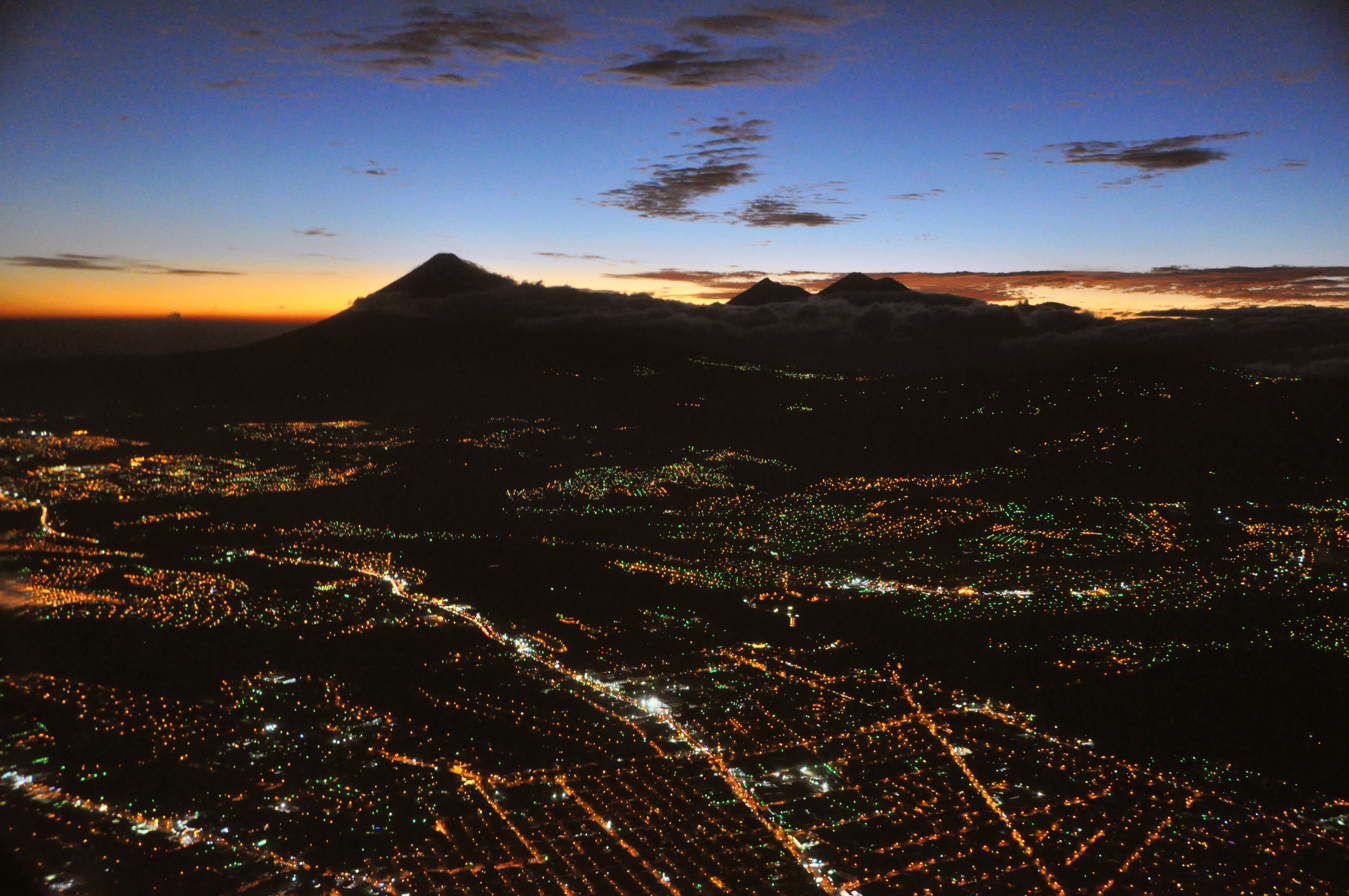
Guatemala City at night

Undocumented Guatemalan migrants living in the U.S. make up the majority of remitters to the country. Young male migrants between 20 and 44 years old account for 63% of U.S. remitters. Many of these migrants have limited education and financial literacy. They typically send monthly remittances averaging $280 directly to their family members, the majority of whom live in rural areas of Guatemala with high levels of poverty. These remittances are primarily used for daily household expenses such as consumption, as well as for education and home improvement. Unskilled labor is the most common employment opportunity for them, with over half of Guatemalan migrants working in areas such as construction. Both senders and receivers of remittances typically have limited access to financial services such as banking or credit.

Initially, the majority of Guatemalan remittances were sent through informal channels consisting of couriers known as viajeros for cash based remittances and cambistas for money orders cashing. These services were offered primarily through the Guatemalan-owned, U.S.-based company, King Express. However, after new anti-money laundering measures began being implemented in the early 2000s the capabilities of these informal operators were drastically reduced, and as a result, migrants began relying more heavily on formal MTOs. King Express still plays a significant role in the Guatemalan money orders market today, but the Growing demand for electronic funds transfer services has seen the rise of Western Union in the Guatemalan remittance market. It was estimated that around 76% of Guatemalan remittances took the form of EFTs in 2005.

Remittances in Guatemala are primarily distributed by large Guatemalan banks, which often have alliances with U.S. based MTOs. Despite the large presence of banks in the Guatemalan economy, many of the country's poor remain un-banked, and there is little effort or incentive to increase the levels of financial inclusion rate of this underrepresented segment of the population. Guatemala has high levels of income inequality, and Guatemalan banks prefer to focus their services on the proportion of the population with much higher incomes.

==== Economic impacts ====
Guatemala has some of the highest poverty and income inequality rates in Latin America. With over 56% of the population living below the poverty line, and 23% population living in extreme poverty. For the poorest households, remittances constitute a major portion of their income, as much as 50-60%. Many of these poor use their remittance money for daily consumption, education, and housing. Despite their extreme dependence on U.S. remittances, the poorest households receive a disproportionate amount of remittances sent to the country. The poorest decile of the population in 2005 received only $270 million of the $3 billion in total remittances or only about 9%. Contrast this with the fact that the 2nd, 3rd, and 4th richest deciles, when combined, received about 50% of remittances that year, and it is easy to see how the income inequality in Guatemala is a serious issue that only seems to be getting worse. While U.S. remittances to Guatemala may be contributing to the widening income gap, it is critical to understand that the poorest segments of the population are the ones who depend on U.S. remittances the most.

== Laws and legislation ==
The PATRIOT Act of 2001 introduced a number of new regulations focused on the security of international money transfers. It increased regulation of bulk cash transportation to and from the United States. It also called for new compliance requirements on banks known as “Know Your Customer” policies. Under the patriot act, banks usually have double I.D. requirements which are much harder for migrants to meet. The Real I.D. Act of 2005 put further pressure on the ability of migrants to obtain legal identification by requiring more a more stringent identification process in obtaining a state-issued driver's license.

The longstanding United States embargo against Cuba had restricted remittances to Cuba until the Cuban thaw in 2014. Remittances were later limited during the Trump administration to a quarterly maximum of $1000, but was reversed under the Biden administration in 2022.

The 2025 One Big Beautiful Bill Act has a 1% tax on remittances.

== Politics and controversy ==
After the terrorist attacks of September 11th, many questioned the role of remittances in the funding of terrorist groups abroad. A study done in 2013 aimed to discover just that. The study, published by Taylor & Francis, found that there was indeed a positive correlation between international remittances received by a country, and the level of domestic terrorism present. In 2016 Presidential candidate Donald Trump ran on a campaign promise of building a wall along the U.S. Mexico border. In November 2016 U.S.-Mexico remittances spiked for a short period, likely because many immigrants were unsure how the U.S.-Mexico relations might be affected by the incoming President Trump. Illegal immigration along the Mexican border also surged with over 47,214 being apprehended that very month. Trump proposed a tax on remittances to Latin America and the Caribbean to pay for the border wall.
