= Advance care planning =

Planning about a patient's future health care

Advance care planning is a process that enables individuals with decisional mental capacity to make plans about their future health care. Advance care plans provide direction to healthcare professionals when a person is not in a position to make and/or communicate their own healthcare choices. Advance care planning is applicable to adults at all stages of life.

Participation in advance care planning has been shown to reduce stress and anxiety for patients and their families, and lead to improvements in end of life care. Older adults are more directly concerned as they may experience a situation where advance care planning can be useful. However, only a small portion of elderly use them.

The main components of advance care planning include the nomination of a substitute decision maker, and the completion of an advance care directive.

== Definition ==
Advance care planning was defined by an international white paper as involving individuals with decisional mental capacity at the outset, being able to be fully involved in plans and discussions about their health care. This has led to some countries in the United Kingdom using 'Future Care Planning' as an umbrella term, to include both advance care planning for those with capacity, and a planning for those with diminished or absent mental capacity (Best Interests decision making as defined by the UK Mental Capacity Act). Professor Mark Taubert, a palliative care consultant who is lead for Advance & Future Care Planning in Wales, published a position paper on this in 2022, and NHS Scotland has also adopted Future Care Planning as an umbrella term, under which Advance Care Planning or Anticipatory Care planning are only a part-component.

== Background ==
Advance care planning may have relevance for adults at any stage of life. Advance care planning typically involves a conversation between people, their families and carers and those looking after them about their future wishes and priorities for care. However, notions of advance care planning vary internationally. Advance care planning aims to allow people to live well, and when death approaches, die in accordance with their personal values. Advance care planning is only applicable when the individual cannot make and/or communicate decisions about what they want in relation to their healthcare. If advance care planning has occurred, patients who have lost capacity or the ability to communicate or both, are able to continue to have a say in their medical care. This has been shown to improve end of life care, and provide improved outcomes for both patients and their surviving relatives.

While applicable to all stages of life, it is particularly applicable to perioperative planning and end-of-life care decision making, since approximately 1 in 4 people lose decision making capacity when approaching the end of their life. Results of a systematic review indicate there are several prognostic indicators to help identify patients who may benefit from advance care planning discussions while still in the primary care setting.

Although ACP is potentially appropriate for nearly all adult patients, given the realities of a busy practice, it would be useful to have a system for identifying patients with a more limited prognosis.

Federal and state legislation in the US, Australia, Canada and the UK supports the right of patients to refuse unwanted medical treatments. People can also express their preferences through written advance directives or by advising their appointed substitute decision maker about their wishes for when they are unable to make or communicate these decisions/wishes themselves.

Increasingly digital approaches are emerging to support the documentation and sharing of advance care planning information, with the majority of approaches using electronic health record systems. Whilst different approaches are emerging, there has been low uptake of digital advance care planning in countries including the UK. Reasons for low uptake have been associated with implementation challenges experienced by health professionals, including interoperability challenges. There is increasing recognition of the need for patients to have access to their own digital advance care plan to verify information stored about their care preferences.

== Components ==
There are two methods by which the communication of an individual's preferences can be known. These are:

1. the appointment of a substitute decision maker, and
2. the completion of an advance care directive or similar document.

Findings from a systematic review suggest the value and importance that various types of decision aids have for patients to use and help clarify their goals.

=== Substitute decision maker ===
A substitute decision maker makes decisions on behalf of an individual only when that individual does not have the capacity to make/communicate decisions for themselves.

There are a number of methods by which a substitute decision maker can be identified. The ideal method is the appointment of a person using a statutory document. In the absence of a statutory document the substitute decision maker may be a "person responsible" as listed in order of authority in legislation.

A substitute decision maker can be chosen by an individual following completion of relevant paperwork, can be assigned to the person by law in the absence of a chosen substitute decision maker (e.g. family member or carer), or can be appointed for the person (e.g. guardian appointed by a guardianship tribunal).

Substitute decision makers make decisions based on the principles of either substituted judgement or best interests. Substituted judgement is when the substitute decision maker arrives at a decision based on the best approximation of what they believe the person would want. This decision should be informed by both the known wishes of the person and the best available healthcare advice. Best interests decision making requires the substitute decision maker to focus on the patient's best interests.

Many, but not all, jurisdictions have legislation supporting the appointment of a substitute decision maker through a statutory document. They have different names depending on the jurisdiction:

| Jurisdiction | | Substitute Decision Maker Type |
|---|---|---|
| Australia | Australian Capital Territory | Enduring Power of Attorney |
| Australia | New South Wales | Enduring Guardian |
| Australia | Northern Territory | N/A |
| Australia | Queensland | Enduring Power of Attorney |
| Australia | South Australia | Medical Power of Attorney |
| Australia | Tasmania | Enduring Guardian |
| Australia | Victoria | Medical Treatment Decision Maker |
| Australia | Western Australia | Enduring Power of Guardianship |
| United Kingdom | | Lasting power of attorney - health and welfare |
| United States | | Health care proxy |
| Canada | Newfoundland and Labrador | Substitute decision maker |
| Canada | Nova Scotia | Delegate Decision maker |
| Canada | New Brunswick | Power of Attorney for personal care |
| Canada | Prince Edward Island | Health Care Proxy |
| Canada | Quebec | Mandatary |
| Canada | Ontario | Power of Attorney for Personal Care |
| Canada | Manitoba | Health Care Proxy |
| Canada | Saskatchewan | Health Care Proxy |
| Canada | Alberta | Healthcare Agent |
| Canada | British Columbia | Temporary Substitute Decision Maker |
| Canada | Yukon Territory | Health Care Proxy |
| Canada | Northwest Territories | Health Care Agent |
| Canada | Nunavut | N/A |

=== Advance care directives ===
An advance care directive is a document detailing an individual's health care preferences. This may include personal values and life goals, describe circumstances the person would find unacceptable, identify preferences relating to specific medical interventions, or a combination of these.

Advance care directives may be written on specifically designed forms, but can also take the form of a written letter or statement. Inclusion of a doctor in the completion of an advance care directive will assist in ensuring that an individual's wishes are clear and written in a manner that is easy for substitute decision makers and/or medical staff to interpret and follow them in the future. Having a physician witness the document will reinforce this by showing future medical staff that the document contains information about informed decisions due to the assistance of a physician.

=== Advance Decisions to Refuse Treatment (United Kingdom) ===
Some countries do not use the term 'directive', due to advance statements and/or advance care plans not usually having the legal standing to enforce a directive (for instance, a patient cannot direct a doctor to give him a specific treatment at a later time-point i.e. when she/he loses decisional capacity). In the United Kingdom, Advance Decisions, or Advance Decisions to Refuse Treatment (short: 'ADRT') have a legal standing under the UK Mental Capacity Act (2005). They can be written down and signed by patients. Such an ADRT must be specific about the treatment that is being refused and the circumstances in which the refusal will apply. To be valid, the person must have been competent and understood the decision when they signed the ADRT. Where the patient's advance decision relates to a refusal of potentially life-saving or life prolonging treatment, this must be recorded in writing and witnessed. Any advance refusal is legally binding, providing that the patient is an adult, the patient was competent and properly informed when reaching the prior decision. It is clearly applicable to the present circumstances and there is no reason to believe that the patient has changed their mind. If an advance decision does not meet these criteria but appears to set out a clear indication of the patient's wishes, it will not be legally binding but should be taken into consideration in determining the patient's best interests. An example of an ADRT is the national form and guidance published by NHS Wales on their Advance and Future Care Planning site.

== Benefits ==
Research conducted in Switzerland with people aged 71 to 80 showed that better knowledge on advance care planning dispositions could improve the perception older people have of them. Communication on dispositions should take into account individual knowledge levels and address commonly enunciated barriers that seem to diminish with increased knowledge.

=== Adults with heart failure ===
Advance care planning (ACP) may help to increase documentation by medical staff regarding discussions with participants, and improve an individual's depression. This involves discussing an individual's future care plan in consideration of the individual's preferences and values. The findings are however, based on low-quality evidence as there is a need for further evidence from large studies to fully explore the effects of ACP for older adults.

=== Older people with frailty ===
Advance care planning can effectively support older people with frailty to express what kind of healthcare they would prefer in the future. It can also improve the outcomes of healthcare received by elderly with frailty.
