= Crime in Georgia (U.S. state) =

In 2008, there were around 434,560 crimes reported in the U.S. state of Georgia, including 650 murders.

== Statistics ==
From 1877 to 1950, the state was the site of at least 586 lynchings of black people, the most of any state.

In 2008, there were 434,560 crimes reported in Georgia, including 650 murders, 387,009 property crimes, and 2,344 rapes.

== Capital punishment laws ==
Capital punishment is applied in this state. Up until 2009, juvenile offenders could be charged as adults for crimes called the seven deadly sins.

== Notable Cases ==
2002 - Chris Benoit double-murder and suicide

2013 - Murder of Antonio Santiago

2024 - Murder of Laken Riley

2024 - 2024 Apalachee High School shooting

== See also ==
- Crime in Atlanta
- Gangs in Georgia
- Law of Georgia (U.S. state)
