= Aging with Dignity =

Non-profit in Florida, United States

Aging with Dignity logo with tagline

Aging with Dignity is a national non-profit organization based in Tallahassee, Florida. The stated mission of Aging with Dignity is to "honor the God-given human dignity of the most vulnerable among us". The primary focus of Aging with Dignity is to improve end-of-life care by encouraging people to make medical decisions in advance of a serious illness.

== History ==
Aging with Dignity was founded in 1996 by Jim Towey, who was inspired by his twelve years of work as legal counsel for Mother Teresa of Calcutta. Founding advisory board members include former Florida Governors Lawton Chiles, Jeb Bush, and Bob Graham, Assistant Secretary on Aging Josefina Carbonell and US Senator Bill Nelson among others. Initial support was provided by the Claude Pepper Foundation, the Harry & Jeannette Weinberg Foundation, and the Robert Wood Johnson Foundation.

== Leadership ==
In addition to founding Aging with Dignity, Jim Towey served as President until his appointment in 2002 as director of the White House Office of Faith-Based and Community Initiatives. He was succeeded by current President Paul Malley.

== Projects ==
=== Five Wishes ===
Five Wishes is a national advance directive that meets the legal requirements in 44 States and the District of Columbia. A Florida-only version was introduced in 1997, followed by a national version in 1998. An online version called Five Wishes Online was introduced in April 2011 allowing users to complete the document using an online interface or print out a blank version to complete by hand. More than 35 million documents are in circulation, distributed by more than 35,000 organizations worldwide. The document combines two legal documents, a living will and health care power of attorney in addition to addressing matters of comfort care, spirituality, forgiveness, and final wishes.

=== Translations ===
Five Wishes has been translated into 29 different languages: Albanian, Arabic, Armenian, Bengali, Chinese Traditional, Chinese Simplified, Croatian, French, German, Gujarati, Haitian Creole, Hebrew, Hindi, Hmong, Ilocano, Italian, Japanese, Khmer, Korean, Persian, Polish, Portuguese, Punjabi, Russian, Somali, Spanish, Tagalog, Urdu, and Vietnamese.

=== Voicing My Choices ===
Voicing My Choices is a planning guide for adolescents and young adults. It seeks to helps young people living with a serious illness to communicate their preferences to friends, family and caregivers. The document was developed by researchers at the Pediatric Oncology Branch, National Cancer Institute and the National Institute of Mental Health at the National Institutes of Health.

=== My Wishes ===
My Wishes is a pediatric document that helps children communicate how they want to be treated if they become very sick. Based on Five Wishes and developed by child life professionals, My Wishes was introduced nationally in May 2006. The document seeks to empower children to make their wishes known, and to facilitate communication with family and health care providers. The My Wishes document is also available in Spanish (Mis Deseos).

=== Hope Today ===
The Hope Today Project is a pilot project serving residents of Franklin and Wakulla counties in Northern Florida. The stated mission of Hope Today is to build networks of support to locate and care for seniors and disabled individuals living alone. The program is intended to serve as a model for replication in other communities.
