= Jay Hein =

American lobbyist (born 1979)

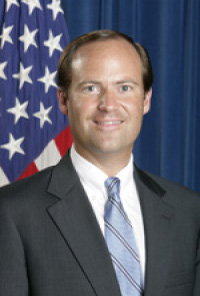

Director of the White House Office of Faith-Based and Community Initiatives
- In office August 3, 2006 – August 29, 2008
- President: George W. Bush
- Preceded by: Jim Towey
- Succeeded by: Jedd Medefind

Personal details
- Born: August 22, 1979 (age 47)
- Party: Republican
- Education: Eureka College (BA); University of Illinois Springfield

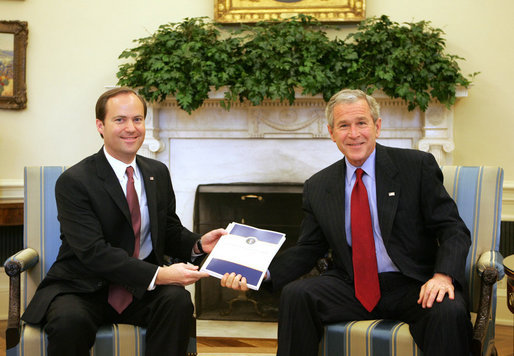
Hein with President George W. Bush in 2008

Jay F. Hein is a former director of the White House Office of Faith-Based and Community Initiatives (OFBCI), and Deputy Assistant to U.S President George W. Bush. As director of the OFBCI, he was charged with the mission of expanding and strengthening the influence of faith based organizations in providing social welfare services. Hein resigned from the post in September 2008 to take a position with the Institute for Studies of Religion at Baylor University, and to return to his former job as president of the Sagamore Institute for Policy Research, a non-profit Indianapolis, Indiana based think tank.

While at the OFBCI, Hein viewed one of its purposes as leveling the playing field for small religious groups that wanted to obtain government grants. He also supported the "hiring rights" of religious-based organizations to require membership in their own religion as a condition of employment, regardless of whether the organization received federal funds.

Prior to his appointment to the OFBCI, Hein, as president and founder of the Sagamore Institute, conducted research that concentrated on community-based reforms. Previous to his involvement with Sagamore, Hein was the director of the conservative Hudson Institute's Civil Society programs. While there, Hein conducted research and analysis to support Wisconsin's welfare reform program and he assisted former Wisconsin Governor Tommy Thompson, and the state of Wisconsin in devising welfare replacement alternatives such as welfare to work and post secondary training and education.

== Education ==
Hein received a bachelor's degree in social science and business from Eureka College in 1987. He was one of the first recipients of the Ronald Reagan Leadership Program scholarship, a full tuition grant given to just 6 entering freshmen each year. Hein also did graduate work in political science at the University of Illinois Springfield, and is now a distinguished fellow at Baylor University, as well as the Director of its Program for Faith and Service.

Political offices
| Preceded by Jim Towey | Director of the White House Office of Faith-Based and Community Initiatives; 2006–2008 | Succeeded by Jedd Medefind |
