= Surrogate decision-maker =

Advocate for incompetent patients

A surrogate decision maker, also known as a health care proxy or as agents, is an advocate for incompetent patients. If a patient is unable to make decisions for themselves about personal care, a surrogate agent must make decisions for them. If there is a durable power of attorney for health care, the agent appointed by that document is authorized to make health care decisions within the scope of authority granted by the document. If people have court-appointed guardians with authority to make health care decisions, the guardian is the authorized surrogate.

== Background ==
At the 1991 Annual Meeting of the American Medical Association, the AMA adopted the report of the Council on Ethical and Judicial Affairs known as, "Decisions to Forgo Life-Sustaining Treatment for Incompetent Patients." The recommendations of the report were the basis for amendments to Opinion 2.20 known as, "Withholding or Withdrawing Life-Sustaining Medical Treatment." The report itself provides guidelines for physicians who may have to identify a surrogate decision maker, assist a surrogate (proxy) in making decisions for incompetent patients, and resolve conflicts that may arise between decision makers, or between the decision maker's choice and medically appropriate options. Since the first incorporation of these guidelines to the AMA Code of Medical Ethics, the council has deferred to Opinion 2.20 to address inquiries involving surrogate decision making, even though the guidelines presented in this Opinion refer only to decisions made near the end of life.

With continued discussion concerning health care preferences for all patients, including those who are incompetent, greater options have been made available to secure health care directives. The involvement of third parties in a patient's health becomes more likely in decisions that may occur in instances other than the end of life.

In addition, the council recognizes that there is a spectrum of decision-making capacity ranging from immaturity, to mental illness, to serious brain damage, and that health care decisions often must be made for individuals with diminished decisional faculties over extended periods of time. The council offers the following report to expand on its previous guidelines and to identify features related to a meaningful and effective physician-proxy relationship.

The report begins by defining a number of terms related to health care directives before presenting theoretical frameworks used in making decisions for incompetent patients. It then provides a protocol for identifying a surrogate decision maker as well as guidance for physicians who may run into conflict either assisting the surrogate in coming to a decision or with the decision itself. Finally, the report offers guidelines for nurturing an effective physician-proxy relationship.

A study was conducted aiming to describe physicians' experiences with surrogate communication and decision making for hospitalized adults. It was concluded that physician-surrogate decision making may be enhanced if patients discuss their preferences in advance and if physician contact with surrogate decision makers is facilitated. A further study by the same group of researchers was conducted exploring the degree to which physicians report reliance on patient preferences when making medical decisions for hospitalized patients lacking decisional capacity. Although a majority of physicians identified patient preferences as the most important general ethical guideline for surrogate decision-making, they relied on a variety of factors when making treatment decisions for a patient lacking decisional capacity.

== Designating a surrogate decision maker ==
The Patient Self-Determination Act guarantees a patient's right to formally designate a surrogate to make treatment decisions for the patient if the patient becomes unable to make their own decisions. A surrogate decision-maker, or durable power of attorney for health care (DPA/HC), must be documented. A common form that is valid in 40 states is Five Wishes.

When filing an advance directive, an alternate health care agent should be identified. The surrogate decision maker must be a trusted individual that is able to make crucial decisions on behalf of the advance directive client. The advance directive should also indicate specific instructions for when a patient is incapacitated. Treatment options should be examined and discussed with a physician, attorney, and family members. Common instructions might include instruction surrounding the use of a feeding tube. The client's inclinations must be clearly written, and the health care agent should fully understand the instructions given as well as how to execute them.

When drafting a health care proxy, it is best to consult a physician and attorney. The forms are available through lawyers, hospitals, and websites dedicated to health care ethics. The proxy must identify the client and the client's agent, also including all contact information. The advance directive must state that the designated agent has authority to make health care decisions on the patient's behalf and what limitations, if any, are imposed on the agent's authority. The document should clearly state that the agent's authority begins only when the patent is unable to make health care decisions. When the document is finished, it must be signed and have been witnessed by two individuals who are not the agents, caregivers, or relatives to the patient. The completed document should be signed by the witnesses and the client of the advance directive. The document should be given to the patent's physician, lawyer, spouse/partner, and family. The advance directive should be reviewed regularly and reflect changes in the client's current marital situation (e.g. marriage or divorce). For the agent to view the medical records of the client, the client should sign a HIPAA (Health Insurance Portability and Accountability Act) release form.

== Criteria for being a surrogate agent ==
In the event that a surrogate decision maker has not been identified through either a medical power of attorney or a court-appointed legal guardian, such an agent is selected by medical personnel. A patient must meet a certain set of criteria prior to the legal selection of a health care surrogate agent. The patient must have a disabling condition such as a mental illness or infirmity, an impairment in the ability to complete activities of daily living, cognitive impairment, and a lack of any previously indicated alternative to guardianship. This person is chosen by either the attending physician or their advance practice nurse. In the US, hierarchy of health care surrogates may vary according to the law of the specific state, but an example order of priority is listed here:

1. The client's guardian
2. The client's spouse
3. Any adult son or daughter of the client
4. Either parent of the client
5. Any adult brother or sister of the client
6. Any adult grandchild of the client, or an adult relative who has exhibited special care and concern, who has maintained close contact, and who is familiar with the patient's activities, health, and religious or moral beliefs
7. A close friend of the client
8. The client's guardian of the estate

When there are multiple candidates at the same level of priority in the hierarchal structure, it becomes their duty to reach an agreement in regard to decisions and care of the patient. If such surrogate agents are unable to develop a consensus, the physician looks to the majority of agents in that category.

If an agent of greater hierarchy becomes available than the current identified agent, the person of higher precedence has priority. If any agent becomes unavailable, the physician returns to the hierarchal structure to indicate the next candidate.

A prime example of this would be Nancy Cruzan. This case has helped to establish some principles of surrogacy, such as using the person who best knows the patient rather than just the next of kin.

=== Controversial agents ===
Any health care surrogate agent is granted the same rights in regard to access of medical information and decision-making as would the alert and competent patient. These rights remain until such time as the client regains decisional capacity, a guardian is appointed, or the patient's death occurs. All health care surrogates are expected to follow the same set of standards: patient's known wishes, substituted judgments, and patient's best interests.

The following people are denied the ability to act as a health care surrogate:

1. The client's treating health care provider
2. An employee of the treating health care provider, unless that employee is a relation of the patient
3. Owner, operator, or administrator of the patient's current health care facility
4. An employee of an owner, operator, or administrator of the patient's current health care facility, unless that employee is a relation of the patient

== Powers and limitations of a surrogate ==
A surrogate decision-maker must use the doctrine of substituted judgment in consenting to or refusing health care on behalf of an incompetent individual. All surrogates, whether appointed by the person, by default, or by the court, have an obligation to follow the expressed wishes of the adult person and to act in the person's best interests, taking into account the person's values if known. If no advance directives are available, the proxy should use the principle of substituted judgment by considering what the patient would want in the given situation. This may require further discussion with others who knew the patient prior to the current period of incapacity.

Occasionally, there is simply no information available about this patient's wishes and a "reasonable person" or best interest standard is applied by the hospital care team. This standard is used when the patient's values are unknown. The best interest's standard is the least preferred standard because surrogates use their own values to decide what is in the patient's best interests—which places a heavy burden on the surrogate. The agent should not be given the power to make decisions against the patient's will, and does not take away the right to make decisions from the patient. This is no longer effective when the agent knows that the patient has died.

== Conflicts of interest ==
A conflict of interest occurs when an individual or organization is involved in multiple interests, one of which could possibly corrupt the motivation for an act in the other. For example, a woman marries a wealthy man. In his final will, the man wants to leave his multi-million dollar estate to his wife. Soon after this occurs, the man becomes ill and falls into an unconscious persistent vegetative state. The wife believes that the care team should take her husband off life support and allow him to die. In this situation, the care team would have to take into account that a conflict of interest could be present. There are other examples of cases following the links listed below.

=== Best interests standard ===
The best interest standard is defined as the best possible outcome for patient in a given situation, the outcome that provides the most benefit to the patient. The values of the client must be taken into account. Religion, any beliefs related to life and death. What are the patient's best interests? Some best interests in order of their standards include life at any cost, freedom from pain, rationality, and dignity. It is all in what the patient chooses to be of utmost importance to them.

== Laws related to surrogacy in the US ==
To decide for themselves, the patient must be competent to decide. This means that the patient must be conscious and able to choose the option they feel is best for their health and well-being. This must be fulfilled first under any circumstance. However, there are some exceptions. Some states have passed laws allowing incompetent patients with certified mental illness to speak for themselves regarding decision-making.

=== Current status of the law ===
Adults that are considered competent have the right to refuse treatment. As stated above, some states allow incompetent adults to refuse treatment. There can also be recommended termination of medical treatment for incompetent adults by a physician. Two tests for competency are the substituted judgment test and the best interests test.

Current statutory solutions include living wills or advance directives that explain the patient's wishes in certain medical situations. A durable power of attorney for health care (DPA/HC) and is another way of identifying a patient's final wishes through an attorney. The patient self-determination act states that hospitals and health care facilities must provide information about advance directives and DPA/HC. Also, a proxy or surrogate decision-maker can provide these final wishes to the doctor or care team if a DPA/HC or AD is not present.

Some fictional assumptions underlying judicial decisions include the following misconceptions:

1. It is better to make a mistake in favor of preserving the patient's life. This is an all too common misconception about surrogate decision-making, and another reason why it is so important to have a DPA/HC or AD. In most cases, patients wish to have a death free from pain, and wish to be only provided with comfort care during the remaining hours of their life.

2. The state has an interest in preserving life. Although euthanasia is illegal in the US, Physician assisted suicide has been passed in some states.

3. Most people want to be kept "alive" by machines. Most people don't want to drain their family's funds to keep them alive especially when they are in a persistent vegetative state with no possible chance for recovery. In these cases, it is often weighing the risks and benefits of keeping the patient breathing, when they are clearly not living their life to its full potential.

4. There is no harm in postponing the decision. Often postponing the decision to keep a person on life support drains resources and funds.

5. Youth withdraw medical treatment from the elderly. Usually the next of kin to the elderly are younger, and know what the best interests of the elderly are and have discussed. Although at times it is difficult to explain the wishes of the patient to the physician or care team when the proxy disagrees with the patient they are representing.

6. The family may terminate medical treatment for financial reasons. It is difficult for a family member to see another family member suffer from illness or in pain, which is often why family members refrain from life support or a feeding tube.

7. Removal of life-sustaining treatment is a step toward euthanasia. Euthanasia and sustaining from treatment are completely different aspects of death. Euthanasia is usually taking an active approach to the death of a patient while removing treatment simply allows the patient to die from their illness while providing them comfort care.

8. The religious oppose termination of life-sustaining treatment. Freedom from pain and comfort care is most often the humane way and accepted by most all religions.
