= Ordinary and extraordinary care =

Aspect of bioethics

This is an article about ethical issues in health care. For other meanings, including those involved in tort law, see Standard of Care (disambiguation).

Ordinary and extraordinary care are distinguished by some bioethical theories, including the teaching of the Catholic Church.

== Catholic doctrine ==
In explaining the Catholic Church's attitude towards preserving life, Pope Pius XII, in a 1957 Address to Anaesthetists, stated: “[...] normally one is held to use only ordinary means – according to circumstances of persons, places, times and culture – that is to say, means that do not involve any grave burden for oneself or another.”

A 1957 article by the Jesuit theologian Father Gerald Kelly provides further detail. Kelly maintains that medical professionals are morally obligated to use ordinary means to preserve the lives of their patients, but extraordinary care is not morally obligatory. Ordinary means are "all medicines, treatments, and operations, which offer a reasonable hope of benefit for the patient and which can be obtained and used without excessive expense, pain or other inconvenience." In this view, everyone is obligated to use ordinary means to preserve his or her life; abstaining from or withholding ordinary means from oneself or another is tantamount to suicide or euthanasia. Extraordinary means are those "which cannot be obtained or used without excessive expense, pain, or other inconvenience, or which, if used, would not offer a reasonable hope of benefit." They involve a disproportionately great burden on the patient or community.

== Secular opinions ==
Ordinary means to preserve life have also been defined as "what is reasonable", taking into account "reasonable/proportionate hope of benefit/success; common diligence; and not unreasonably demanding." In this view, elements of extraordinary needs are "what is inappropriate", characterized by “certain impossibility; excessive effort; level of pain; extraordinarily expensive; and causing severe dread or revulsion."

The American Life League maintains that ordinary care can become extraordinary care under certain situations.
