= Seven-deadly-sins law =

US law intended to address violent crime among youth

In the United States, a seven-deadly-sins law for juvenile offenders is a law intended to address the increasing rates of violent crime among youth. The law has taken many forms in different state legislatures in the United States. However, the "seven deadly sins" aspect always refers to the jurisdiction of the superior court over the trial of any juvenile 13–17 years old who allegedly committed murder, rape, armed robbery with firearm, aggravated child molestation, aggravated sodomy, aggravated sexual battery, or voluntary manslaughter. In the mid 1990s, numerous US states enacted seven-deadly-sins laws to combat so-called teen "superpredators," a predicted wave of remorseless teenaged criminals. However, this prediction did not come to fruition.

== By state ==
=== Georgia ===
Among the states in the US to pass such a bill was Georgia, whose State Bill 440 attempted "to provide that certain juvenile offenders who commit certain violent felonies shall be tried as adults in the superior court."

In April 1994, the law was passed in the US state of Georgia.

State Bill 440 attempted "to provide that certain juvenile offenders who commit certain violent felonies shall be tried as adults in the superior court." This meant that murder, armed robbery, kidnapping, rape, aggravated sexual battery, aggravated sodomy and aggravated child molestation carried a minimum of 10 years in prison, with the latter four crimes carrying a minimum of 25 years to life in prison. First-degree murder is punishable by death, life in prison without parole or life in prison with no parole for at least 30 years, while second-degree murder carries a sentence of imprisonment for not less than 10 years and up to 30 years. Anyone convicted a second time of any of these crimes will automatically be sentenced to life imprisonment without the possibility of parole. The law was approved by voters on November 8, 1994 and was signed into law by then Governor Zell Miller on December 15, 1994 and went into effect on January 1, 1995. The law is codified and found under Title 17, Chapter 10, Section 7 (OCGA Section 17-10-7) of the Official Code of Georgia Annotated.

In 2009, a bill softened the effects of that law, regressing from the default to try violent minor offenders as adults.

== See also ==
- Young offender
- Defense of infancy
- Juvenile delinquency
- Juvenile court
- Trial as an adult
- Capital punishment for juvenile offenders
- Roper v. Simmons
- Crime in Georgia (U.S. state)
