= James Q. Wilson =

American political scientist and public policy expert

- Born: James Quinn Wilson; May 27, 1931; Denver, Colorado, U.S.
- Died: March 2, 2012 (aged 80); Boston, Massachusetts, U.S.
- Education: University of Redlands (BA); University of Chicago (MA, PhD)
- Known for: Broken windows theory
- Awards: Lifetime Achievement Award, American Political Science Association; Presidential Medal of Freedom; Charles E. Merriam Award for Outstanding Public Policy Research (1977); James Madison Award (1990); Bradley Prize (2007)
- Scientific career
- Fields: Political science; Public administration; Sociology
- Workplaces: Boston College; Harvard University (1961–1987); University of California, Los Angeles (1987–1997); Pepperdine University (1998–2009); American Political Science Association; RAND Corporation; American Enterprise Institute; American Academy of Arts and Sciences; American Philosophical Society; Human Rights Foundation

James Quinn Wilson (May 27, 1931 – March 2, 2012) was an American political scientist and an authority on public administration. Most of his career was spent as a professor at the University of California, Los Angeles (UCLA) and Harvard University. He was the chairman of the Council of Academic Advisors of the American Enterprise Institute, member of the President's Foreign Intelligence Advisory Board (1985–1990), and the President's Council on Bioethics. He was Director of Joint Center for Urban Studies at Harvard and the Massachusetts Institute of Technology (MIT).

Wilson was the former president of the American Political Science Association and a member of the American Academy of Arts and Sciences, the American Philosophical Society and Human Rights Foundation. He also was a co-author of a leading university textbook, American Government, and wrote many scholarly books and articles, and op-ed essays. He gained national attention for a 1982 article introducing the broken windows theory in The Atlantic. In 2003, he was awarded the Presidential Medal of Freedom by President George W. Bush.

== Early life and education ==
Wilson was born in Denver, Colorado, but grew up mostly in Long Beach, California. His father, Claude Wilson, worked as a salesman. His mother, Marie, was an at-home parent who did not work outside the home.

Wilson completed his B.A. at the University of Redlands in 1952, and he was its national collegiate debate champion in 1951 and 1952.

He served in the U.S. Navy during the Korean War, but did not see combat.

Wilson completed an M.A. (1957) and a Ph.D. (1959) in political science at the University of Chicago.

== Career ==
From 1961 to 1987, Wilson was the Shattuck Professor of Government at Harvard University. His 1975 book Thinking About Crime put forward a novel theory of incapacitation as the most effective explanation for the reduction in crime rates observed where longer prison sentences were the norm. Criminals might not be deterred by the threat of longer sentences, but repeat offenders would be prevented from further offending, simply because they would be in jail rather than out on the street.

Wilson and George L. Kelling introduced the broken windows theory in the March 1982 edition of The Atlantic Monthly. In an article titled "Broken Windows", they argued that the symptoms of low-level crime and disorder (e.g. a broken window) create an environment that encourages more crimes, including serious ones.

From 1987 to 1997, he was the James Collins Professor of Management and Public Policy at the UCLA Anderson School of Management at UCLA. From 1998 to 2009, he was the Ronald Reagan Professor of Public Policy at Pepperdine University's School of Public Policy.

Wilson authored the university text American Government, and coauthored later editions with John J. DiIulio, Jr. The text has been widely sold, though its use became controversial in later years after universities alleged it to have inaccuracies and "right-wing bias".

Wilson was a former chairman of the White House Task Force on Crime (1966), of the National Advisory Commission on Drug Abuse Prevention (1972–1973) and a member of the Attorney General's Task Force on Violent Crime (1981), the President's Foreign Intelligence Advisory Board (1985–1990), and the President's Council on Bioethics. He was a former president of the American Political Science Association. He served on the board of directors for the New England Electric System (now National Grid USA), Protection One, RAND, and State Farm Mutual Insurance.

He was the chairman of the Council of Academic Advisors of the American Enterprise Institute. He was a member of the American Academy of Arts and Sciences, the American Philosophical Society, and the International Council of the New York-based Human Rights Foundation.

== Political views ==
Early in his career, Wilson was a liberal. Over time, his views shifted towards conservatism. As a young professor he "voted for John Kennedy, Lyndon Johnson and Hubert Humphrey and worked in the last's presidential campaign." Wilson was later recognized as a leading conservative scholar, as indicated by his advisory position to the American Enterprise Institute.

Wilson was a staunch advocate for perseverance in the war on drugs:

Even now, when the dangers of drug use are well understood, many educated people still discuss the drug problem in almost every way except the right way. They talk about the "costs" of drug use and the "socioeconomic factors" that shape that use. They rarely speak plainly—drug use is wrong because it's immoral and it is immoral because it enslaves the mind and destroys the soul.

Wilson also pioneered the idea that public administration was increasingly replete with political calculations and concerns:

This is because our constitutional structure and our traditions afford individuals manifold opportunities not only to bring their special interests to the attention of public officials but also — and this the important thing — to compel officials to bargain and to make compromises. The nature of the governmental system gives private interests such good opportunities to participate in the making of public decisions that there is virtually no sphere of 'administration' apart from politics.

Wilson studied conflict between "amateur" and "professional" participants in politics, especially in the Democratic Party in the 1960s. He argued that professional politicians, parties, political machines and informal power structures were essential to the functioning of the government and its formal power structures. In 1962, he wrote that "If legal power is badly fragmented among many independent elective officials and widely decentralized among many levels of government, the need for informal methods of assembling power becomes great."

== Personal life ==
On September 13, 1952, Wilson married Roberta (Evans) Wilson; they originally met in high school, and remained married until his death, nearly sixty years later. The couple had two children.

Wilson enjoyed scuba diving.

== Death ==
Wilson died in Boston, Massachusetts, on March 2, 2012, from complications caused by leukemia.

== Awards ==
- Honorary doctorate from Brigham Young University, 1994
- Honorary doctorate from Harvard University
- Lifetime Achievement Award, American Political Science Association, 2001
- Presidential Medal of Freedom by President George W. Bush in 2003

== Books ==
- American Politics, Then and Now (2010)
- American Government, 12th ed. (2010, with John J. DiIulio, Jr.)
- Understanding America: The Anatomy of an Exceptional Nation (2008, ed. with Peter Schuck)
- The Marriage Problem: How Our Culture Damages Families (2002)
- Moral Judgment (1997)
- The Moral Sense. New York: Free Press. 1993.
- On Character: Essays by James Q. Wilson (1991)
- Bureaucracy (1989) – "his masterwork"
- Crime and Human Nature (1985, with Richard Herrnstein)
- Watching Fishes: Life and Behavior on Coral Reefs (1985, with Roberta Wilson)
- The Politics of Regulation (1980)
- The Investigators (1978)
- Thinking About Crime (1975)
- Political Organizations (1973)
- Varieties of Police Behavior (1968)
- City Politics (1963, with Edward C. Banfield)
- The Amateur Democrat (1962)
- Negro Politics (1960)

== Films ==
- Vigilante Vigilante: The Battle for Expression (2011)
