= Mayberry Machiavelli =

Mayberry Machiavelli is a satirically pejorative phrase coined by John J. DiIulio Jr., a former George W. Bush administration staffer who ran the President's Faith-Based Initiative.

== Origin ==
After DiIulio resigned from his White House post in late 2001, journalist Ron Suskind quoted him in an Esquire magazine article describing the administration of the Bush White House as follows: "What you've got is everything—and I mean everything—being run by the political arm. It's the reign of the Mayberry Machiavellis." In a 2002 letter to Suskind (but not published until 2007), DiIulio wrote that the "Mayberry Machiavellis" were the junior and senior staffers who reduced every issue to a simplistic black and white, us vs them narrative and prioritized politics over good policy.

The phrase invokes the infamous Machiavellian-style power politics coupled with the simplistic mindset of a rural small town, as exemplified by the fictional town of Mayberry in the television shows The Andy Griffith Show and its spin-off Mayberry R.F.D., which ran on the American television network CBS from 1960 to 1971.

== Usage ==
In 2004, Fantagraphics published a political comics anthology called The Bush Junta: Cartoonists on the Mayberry Machiavelli and the Abuse of Power, co-edited by Mack White and Gary Groth.

In addition to its initial association with the Bush administration, the phrase has also been applied to the Obama administration and the Trump administration.
