= Engage With Grace =

- Founded: 2008
- Founders: Alexandra Drane, Matthew Holt
- Type: Nonprofit organization
- Purpose: End-of-life planning

Engage With Grace is a non-profit, viral movement designed to help start the conversation about the end-of-life experience. The movement is built around The One Slide, which has five questions and can be used to help people better understand and communicate their preferences to loved ones. Engage With Grace also promotes the importance of supporting each other’s preferences and ensuring that these wishes are honoured.

== History ==
The concept for Engage With Grace was developed by Alexandra Drane (Co-Founder and Chairman of the Board of Eliza Corporation) and Matthew Holt (Founder of Health 2.0, and The Health Care Blog) in the summer of 2008, following a discussion about how few people discuss their end-of-life preferences. Both Holt and Drane had personally experienced the consequences of not knowing their loved ones’ preferences. In addition, they wanted to address statistics like the one suggesting that 73% of Americans would prefer to die at home, but only about 25% do.
