= John J. DiIulio Jr. =

American political scientist (born 1958)

John DiIulio

Director of the White House Office of Faith-Based and Community Initiatives
- In office January 29, 2001 – August 17, 2001
- President: George W. Bush
- Preceded by: Position established
- Succeeded by: Jim Towey

Personal details
- Born: 1958 (age 67–68)
- Party: Democratic
- Education: University of Pennsylvania (BA, MA); Harvard University (MA, PhD)

John J. DiIulio Jr. (born 1958) is an American political scientist. He currently serves as the Frederic Fox Leadership Professor of Politics, Religion, and Civil Society and Professor of Political Science at the University of Pennsylvania.

== Career ==
In 1980, DiIulio received a B.A. in Economics and Political Science and an M.A. in Political Science-Public Policy from the University of Pennsylvania. In 1982, he received an M.A. in political science from Harvard University, followed by a Ph.D. in political science in 1986. After a stint teaching at Harvard, DiIulio then spent thirteen years at Princeton University as a professor of politics and public policy. Since 1999, he has been a professor at the University of Pennsylvania. DiIulio has also been a fellow at the Brookings Institution (1992–2006) and the Manhattan Institute (1995–2000).

During an academic leave in 2001, DiIulio served as the first director of the White House Office of Faith-Based and Community Initiatives under President George W. Bush. He was the first senior Bush advisor to resign and was succeeded by Jim Towey. In a letter written a little over a year after resigning (that later was printed in Esquire), he wrote that while "President Bush is a highly admirable person of enormous personal decency", his governing style allowed certain staffers, referred to as "Mayberry Machiavellis", to "[steer] legislative initiatives or policy proposals as far right as possible." In late 2008 and early 2009, DiIulio consulted with the transition team of President Barack Obama regarding the restructuring of the White House faith-based initiative.

DiIulio has authored numerous studies on crime, government, and the relationship between religion and public policy. He is also the co-author with James Q. Wilson of the widely used textbook American Government, which was reviewed by the publisher and the College Board after the discovery of factual inaccuracies and allegations of conservative bias regarding issues such as global warming, school prayer, and gay rights. Among those who criticized the textbook was James E. Hansen, the director of NASA's Goddard Institute for Space Studies, who wrote to the publisher that the book contained "a large number of clearly erroneous statements" which cause "the mistaken impression that the scientific evidence of global warming is doubtful and uncertain."

He is also responsible for popularizing the concept of superpredators in reference to juvenile violent crime in the early 1990s. Under this concept DiIulio and his co-authors, William J. Bennett and John P. Walters, referred to recidivist delinquents as, "radically impulsive, [and] brutally remorseless youngsters..."

DiIulio predicted that juvenile crime would triple by 2010. The next few years resulted in a change of juvenile sentencing, which led to many juvenile cases being treated by adult sentencing standards. DiIulio and other researchers had argued that juvenile crime was out of control; however, research showed that juvenile crime began to decline in the early to mid-1990s. According to the Juvenile Justice and Delinquency Prevention Office, from 1994 to 2011, murders committed by juveniles had declined by two-thirds. DiIulio later disavowed the superpredator theory but said that "once it was out there, there was no reeling it in."

He was recognized in 2010 with two awards, the Ira Abrams Memorial Award and the Lindback Award for Distinguished Teaching, for excellence in academics and teaching.

== Selected bibliography ==
- DiIulio Jr., John J. (2005), "My Black Crime Problem, and Ours", in Gabbidon, Shaun L.; Taylor Greene, Helen (eds.), Race, Crime, and Justice: A Reader, New York: Routledge, pp. 73–85, ISBN 9780415947077. Preview.

== See also ==
- List of United States political appointments that crossed party lines

Political offices
New office	Director of the White House Office of Faith-Based and Community Initiatives; 2001	Succeeded by Jim Towey
