= American Government (textbook) =

2012 textbook by James Q. Wilson and John J. DiIulio Jr

American Government: Institutions and Policies
- American Government, tenth edition
- Authors: James Q. Wilson; John J. DiIulio, Jr. Meena Bose; Matthew Levendusky
- Language: English
- Subject: American Government
- Publisher: Houghton Mifflin Harcourt
- Publication date: 1 January 2012
- Publication place: United States
- Media type: Print
- Pages: 688
- ISBN: 0-618-56244-3
- OCLC: 61717399

American Government is a 2012 textbook, now in its seventeenth edition, by the noted public administration scholar James Q. Wilson and political scientist John J. DiIulio, Jr. DiIulio is a Democrat who served as the director of the White House Office of Faith-Based and Community Initiatives under president George W. Bush in 2001. Wilson, a Republican, chaired and participated in numerous White House task forces and commissions, and was awarded the Presidential Medal of Freedom by president George W. Bush in 2003. Wilson died in March 2012.

The book examines and analyzes the government of the United States, covering every aspect of government from elections to interest groups. The current edition, American Government: Institutions and Policies also lists co-authors Meena Bose and Matthew Levendusky. It is published by Cengage Learning.

This book is currently used in both college and Advanced Placement high school courses across the United States. The book is roughly 780 pages and includes the U.S. Constitution, U.S. Bill of Rights, outcomes of various elections throughout U.S. history, and famous court cases. It is accompanied by a companion website that features practice test questions and detailed explanations on each chapter.

== Controversy ==
The textbook became an item of national news coverage in April 2008. Matthew LaClair, a New Jersey high school senior, expressed concerns to the think tank Center for Inquiry regarding what he felt was conservative bias in the textbook and inaccuracies about its coverage of global warming. He wrote an opinion piece in the Los Angeles Times. The group issued a critical report on the textbook. The group's criticism of the coverage on climate was buttressed by a few scientists and then additional criticism from legal scholars, who claimed the book presented a skewed view of separation of church and state. The publisher, Houghton Mifflin, announced that it would review the book, as did the College Board, which oversees college-level Advanced Placement courses used in high schools.

Wilson responded to the complaint in an editorial, arguing both that the text is not unduly biased and stating that the 11th edition of the book states that scientific dispute with regard to the extent of global warming still exists but is much less than when the 10th edition was published.
