= Standard of care (disambiguation) =

Standard of care is a legal term in tort law

Standard of care or Standards of care may also refer to:

- Standard of care in English law
- Standards of Care for the Health of Transgender and Gender Diverse People
- Medical standard of care
