= Gangs in Georgia (U.S. state) =

Criminal organizations

The US state of Georgia has seen a rise in the number of gangs over recent years, in the main focused on the illegal drug trade.

== Development of gangs ==
Many gangs started appearing in Georgia in the mid 1980s, as a result of the crack cocaine epidemic. In 2003, there were an estimated 78 gangs in the Atlanta area alone. In 2015, Atlanta police announced that they were tracking an estimated 192 gangs. In more recent times, Mexican drug cartels have established Atlanta as a major distribution hub for methamphetamine, marijuana, cocaine, and heroin. Drug dealing is the main source of money for gang members, which has led some of the gangs to form untraditional alliances with one another. Armed robbery, commonly drug robberies, are another way in which gangs capitalize in Atlanta's open air drug market.

The Italian Mafia has long considered Atlanta and its suburbs to be "open territory"; its local Italian-American population was never old, large, or cohesive enough to field a local crime family on its own. Rather, families from other cities, such as New York's Five Families, have over the years embarked on one-off business ventures such as local restaurants, bars, and strip clubs as lucrative investments in their own right, or as front companies and mechanisms for money laundering. There are also a handful of Greek families owning local diners that, over the years, have been reputed as having connections with these larger syndicates.

There are also Asian gangs, mainly in the northeastern part of Atlanta, as well as individuals linked with the Russian mafia.

== Territories ==
The well-known gangs are mainly concentrated in the West, Southwest, Southeast, and East Atlanta such as "The Robbing Crew" from Decatur, “61PK” from Dallas, and the "FENNOKES" from College Park with many gangs with turf on the outskirts of the city and have hybrid sets that are found in smaller cities all over Georgia. Some of the gangs are nationwide, such as the Sureños, Bloods, Gangster Disciples, Black Disciples, Nortenos, Crips, Latin Kings, Tiny Rascal Gang, and MS-13 who have sent high ranking shot callers to establish local neighborhood cliques as loyal sets under the same flag. The Ghost Face Gangsters have operations in North Georgia, specifically in the prisons, with territories that stretch from Cobb County to Dade County.

== Gang recruitment at schools ==
In 2018, 157 counties reported in a rise of gang activity and 155 school districts reported suspected gang activity. Gangs also use social media to recruit children into joining.

== Media coverage ==
Downtown Atlanta has had national television coverage about the gang situation. The city was featured on the show Gangland, in the episodes "Death in Dixie", "Street Law", and "Death Before Dishonor". In addition, the city has been featured on Drugs, Inc.
