= Superpredator =

Moral panic and media myth

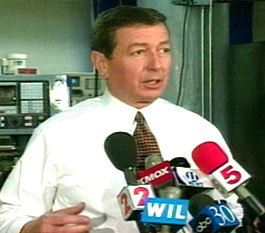
On February 18, 1999, John Ashcroft announced that he would propose and support legislation that would give federal prosecutors "greater flexibility to try violent juveniles as adults".

The superpredator or super-predator is a type of criminal in a now-discredited criminological theory that became popular in the 1990s in the United States, positing that a small but increasing population of impulsive (often urban) young men were willing to commit extremely violent crimes without remorse. Criminologist and political scientist John J. DiIulio Jr. theorized that superpredators were a growing phenomenon and predicted a large increase in youth crime and violence as a result. At the time, the idea of superpredators contributed to a nationwide moral panic regarding juvenile crime, particularly Black juvenile crime. Proponents of the theory warned of "a blood bath of violence" or "Lord of the Flies on a massive scale". American lawmakers seized on this idea, and implemented tough-on-crime legislation for juvenile offenders across the country, including life imprisonment without the possibility of parole. The theory would later face criticism, which led to its supporters getting protested against for calling Black people superpredators and Dilulio having to admit that his theory was flawed.

== Theory ==
In 1995, DiIulio coined the term superpredator for an article for The Weekly Standard, where he sought to convey an increase in violence among juveniles and the insufficiency of the juvenile justice system. In this article, he claimed that juvenile crime was rising in big cities because of kids with "absolutely no respect for human life and no sense of the future". Moreover, Dilulio attributed the rise of superpredators to extreme moral poverty, which he which he claimed was the result of children lacking adults in their lives who could teach them proper moral behavior. He theorized that there would be 30,000 new superpredators by the year 2000, that most of the crime would occur in Black inner-city neighborhoods, and that investing in religious institutions would help stop juvenile crime and moral poverty.

== Criticisms ==
This theory was criticized when crime significantly decreased in the following years. One reason for this criticism was the belief that the superpredator theory was used to justify disproportionate sentencing of African-American children, with individuals like J. C. Howell calling it "the most damaging and erroneous myth propagated in the 100-year history of the juvenile justice system in the United States". A Miami University study of United States media coverage of the 1999 Columbine High School massacre suggested that it reinforced the superpredator theory, especially with "alarmist responses to erroneous fears about growing rates and severity of youth violence". Additionally, several people began criticizing the idea that moral poverty caused the increase in juvenile crime. Legal scholars such as Franklin Zimring suggested that the greater access to guns was more likely to have increased the amount of juvenile homicides, while American journalists such as Kevin Drum proposed that the use of leaded gasoline could have caused the high crime rates of the 1980s and 1990s. Moreover, the arguments of proponents were eventually criticized for multiple errors in logic. Other errors also came to be criticized, such as one case where the wrong number was used in a calculation; the number of chronic offenders in a study was replaced with the much larger number for all police contacts, substantially inflating the predicted crime rate.

== History ==
United States politics has pursued a tough-on-crime approach through the policies they have created, rising significantly in the 1970s. The motivation for such policies was to reduce crime by criminalizing individuals with harsher sentences to keep them in prison and off the streets where there was potential to commit crimes. The harsher sentences made it more difficult to challenge a wrongful conviction, giving birth to the ideal conditions to attack minorities disproportionately.

During the war on drugs conducted by the Reagan Administration, the presence of crack cocaine in the inner-city led to an increase in crime in the 1980s as drug offenses rocketed with murder and non-negligent manslaughter right behind, hitting African American communities the hardest. With the tough-on-crime approach during the war on drugs, there was a deterrence approach where harsher penalties were hoped to deter individuals from the use of cocaine. This contributed to America's mass incarceration, leading to mainly minority communities filling up the prison systems, with 1 in 4 African American males being incarcerated or on parole by 1989.

Juvenile detention in the US
Year	Male	Female	Total
1997	90,771	14,284	105,055
1999	92,985	14,508	107,493
2001	89,115	15,104	104,219
2003	81,975	14,556	96,531
2006	78,998	13,723	92,721
2007	75,017	11,797	86,814
2010	61,359	9,434	70,793
2011	53,079	8,344	61,423
2013	46,421	7,727	54,148
2015	40,750	7,293	48,043
2017	36,982	6,598	43,580
2019	31,064	5,415	36,479
2021	21,340	3,554	24,894

A chart created by the U.S. Office of Juvenile Justice and Delinquency Prevention titled "Total juvenile detention chart for the U.S.". It shows that the number of juveniles detained pending trial was at its highest after Dilulio announced the super-predator theory in 1995, and decreased starting in 2001, after he denounced the theory.

On November 27, 1995, John Dilulio shared his theory about superpredators in his article for The Weekly Standard. The media proceeded to report on this theory throughout the 1990s, leading to criminologists and law enforcement officials showing support for it, with some of them claiming that because of superpredators, the nation was being terrorized by children like in 'Lord of the Flies'. According to Michael E. Jennings, this caused stereotypes about African American men to be reinforced, leading to the public's conclusion that African American males were predators that society needed to deal with. The media's continued use of the word "superpredators" also caused it to enter the national zeitgeist of the 1990s, leading to journalists and talk show hosts such as Oprah Winfrey using the term without referencing DiIulio.

On January 25, 1996, First Lady Hillary Clinton used the term superpredator in a speech at Keene State College. In this speech, she said that the fourth challenge shared by Americans was dealing with crime and gangs of "kids that are called superpredators," who lacked remorse for their actions.

The transcript of the 106th Congress' first session to examine funding and strategies for juvenile crime prevention and intervention on September 28th, 1999.

On September 28th, 1999, the Senate Subcommittee on Youth Violence for the 106th Congress held its first session to examine funding for juvenile crime prevention programs so that groups that received funding would work in coordination with the juvenile justice system. In the opening statement for this session, Senator Jeff Sessions acknowledged that people saw the juvenile court system as a punishment system.

By the end of the 1990s, the fear of superpredators caused politicians throughout the United States to advocate for the dismantlement of juvenile protections. This led to most states adopting policies that allowed juveniles to be tried in adult court, as well as making the punishments for juveniles convicted of crimes harsher.

In 2001, Dilulio acknowledged that his theory was flawed and apologized for the consequences that it wrought. In the years after this acknowledgment, the number of juveniles detained pending trial decreased dramatically.

During her campaign for the United States presidential election in 2016, Hillary Clinton was confronted by an activist named Ashley Williams at a private fundraiser in Charleston, South Carolina. At this fundraiser, Williams began protesting Clinton's description of Black people as superpredators in her 1996 speech. Following this incident, Clinton received more criticism for her use of the term, as well as for her support of the 1994 Crime Bill, ultimately leading to her giving an apology for her language, but not her support of the Crime Bill, on February 25, 2016.

== Impact ==
The superpredator theory reinforced stereotypes about Black Americans and encouraged the development of tough-on-crime legislation. Shared public fear in combination with the tough-on-crime approach already established led to harsh policies for juveniles, especially African American and Latino youth, such as life without parole, abolition of parole, and removing juveniles from their respective courts to adult court with adult sentences. At the time, the newer sentencing laws impacted more than 2,000 children, with 70% being of color. After being arrested, juveniles became 30% more likely to be reincarcerated, leading to more exposure to the consequences of their conviction, such as homelessness, school enrollment challenges, unemployment, and more.
