= Five Wishes =

US living will and health care power of attorney document

Cover of Five Wishes

Five Wishes is a United States advance directive created by the non-profit organization Aging with Dignity. It has been described as the "living will with a heart and soul".

== History ==
Five Wishes was originally introduced in 1996 as a Florida-only document, combining a living will and health care power of attorney in addition to addressing matters of comfort care and spirituality. With help from the American Bar Association's Commission on Law and Aging and leading medical experts, a national version of Five Wishes was introduced in 1998. It was originally distributed with support from a grant by the Robert Wood Johnson Foundation. With assistance from the United Health Foundation, Five Wishes is now available in 28 languages and in Braille. More than 40 million documents have been distributed by a network of over 40,000 partner organizations worldwide. An online version called Five Wishes Online was introduced in April 2011 allowing users to complete the document using an online interface or print out a blank version to complete by hand. An updated version, renamed Five Wishes Digital, debuted in 2022, including options for all 50 states, and fully digital signing and witnessing options.

== The Five Wishes ==
Wishes 1 and 2 are both legal documents. Once signed, they meet the legal requirements for an advance directive in the states listed below. Wishes 3, 4, and 5 are unique to Five Wishes, in that they address matters of comfort care, spirituality, forgiveness, and final wishes.

- Wish 1: "The Person I Want to Make Care Decisions for Me When I Can't" – This section is an assignment of a health care agent (also called proxy, surrogate, representative, or health care power of attorney). This person makes medical decisions on a person's behalf if they are unable to speak for themselves.
- Wish 2: "The Kind of Medical Treatment I Want or Don't Want" – This section is a living will—a definition of what life support treatment means to a person, and when they would and would not want it.
- Wish 3: "How Comfortable I Want to Be" – This section addresses matters of comfort care—what type of pain management a person would like, personal grooming and bathing instructions, and whether they would like to know about options for hospice care, among others.
- Wish 4: "How I Want People to Treat Me" – This section speaks to personal matters, such as whether one would like to be at home and whether a person would like someone to pray at their bedside.
- Wish 5: "What I Want My Loved Ones to Know" – This section deals with matters of forgiveness, how a person wishes to be remembered, and final wishes regarding funeral or memorial plans.

== Signing and witnessing requirements ==
The last portion of the document contains a section for signing the document and having it witnessed. The document indicates which states require notarization.

== Legal requirements ==
According to analysis by the American Bar Association's Commission on Law and Aging, Five Wishes currently meets the legal requirements for an advance directive in 46 states and the District of Columbia. In the remaining 4 states (Kansas, New Hampshire, Ohio, Texas), a statutory form is required, and one must attach the state document if one wishes to use the Five Wishes document as a guide.

== Translations ==
Five Wishes has been translated from English into 30 other languages: Albanian; Arabic; Armenian; Bengali; Chinese Traditional; Chinese Simplified; Croatian; French; German; Gujarati; Haitian Creole; Hebrew; Hindi; Hmong; Ilocano; Italian; Japanese; Khmer; Korean; Nepali; Persian; Polish; Portuguese; Punjabi; Russian; Somali; Spanish; Tagalog; Urdu; Vietnamese.
