= Wrongful life =

Civil law action which alleges that a defendant has wrongfully caused a child to be born

Wrongful life is the name given to a cause of action in which someone is sued by a severely disabled child (through the child's legal guardian) for failing to prevent the child's birth. Typically, a child and the child's parents will sue a doctor or a hospital for failing to provide information about the disability during the pregnancy, or a genetic disposition before the pregnancy. Had the mother been aware of this information, it is argued, she would have had an abortion, or chosen not to conceive at all.

The term "wrongful life" is also sometimes applied to what are more accurately described as wrongful living claims alleging that doctors or hospitals failed to follow a patient's end-of-life directive (for example, a MOLST or POLST) and kept the patient alive longer than preferred, thereby causing unnecessary and unwanted suffering. However, the confusion between the two is understandable and readily explained. Although wrongful life and wrongful living claims arise at opposite ends of the human lifespan, they are related in the sense that both types of claims seek the same relief: a judgment awarding monetary damages for "unwanted life."

== History ==
Historically, only parents could sue for their own damages incurred as a result of the birth of a disabled child (e.g., the mother's own pregnancy medical bills and cost of psychiatric treatment for both parents' emotional distress resulting from the realization that their child was disabled). This cause of action is known as wrongful birth. But the child could not sue for his or her own damages, which were often much more substantial, in terms of the cost of round-the-clock personal care and special education.

In four U.S. states—California, Maine, New Jersey, and Washington—the child is allowed to bring a wrongful life cause of action for such damages. In a 1982 case involving hereditary deafness, the Supreme Court of California was the first state supreme court to endorse the child's right to sue for wrongful life, but in the same decision, limited the child's recovery to special damages. This rule implies that the child can recover objectively provable economic damages, but cannot recover general damages like subjective "pain and suffering"—that is, monetary compensation for the entire experience of having a disabled life versus having a healthy mind and/or body.

The Supreme Court of California's 1982 decision, in turn, was based on the landmark California Court of Appeal decision in Curlender v. Bio-Science Laboratories (1980). The Curlender decision involved a child who was allegedly born with Tay–Sachs disease after the parents relied upon the defendants' representations about the reliability of their genetic tests in refraining from proceeding with amniocentesis.

The most famous passage from the Curlender opinion is as follows:

The circumstance that the birth and injury have come hand in hand has caused other courts to deal with the problem by barring recovery. The reality of the "wrongful-life" concept is that such a plaintiff both exists and suffers, due to the negligence of others. It is neither necessary nor just to retreat into meditation on the mysteries of life. We need not be concerned with the fact that had defendants not been negligent, the plaintiff might not have come into existence at all. The certainty of genetic impairment is no longer a mystery. In addition, a reverent appreciation of life compels recognition that plaintiff, however impaired she may be, has come into existence as a living person with certain rights.

Curlender was not the first appellate decision to authorize a cause of action for wrongful life—it noted that a 1977 decision of the intermediate appellate court of New York had taken the same position, and was promptly overruled by the highest court of that state a year later. However, Curlender stands as the first such appellate decision which was not later overruled.

Most other jurisdictions, including all U.S. states except California, Maine, New Jersey, and Washington; England and Wales; Ontario; and Australia, have refused to allow the wrongful life cause of action.

In Germany, the Federal Constitutional Court declared wrongful life claims unconstitutional. The court reasoned that such a claim implies that the life of a disabled person is less valuable than that of a non-disabled one. Therefore, claiming damages for one's life as such violates the human dignity principle codified in the first article of the German Basic Law.

Nevertheless, the German Federal Court stuck to its previous practice of granting to suffered families indemnification in form of living expenses for a child. It emphasized that damages referred to did not imply the existence of the child by itself but the economical obligation of parents to pay maintenance. It was finally upheld by the Constitutional Court in 1998, stating no matter what was the difference between existence of a child and parents' obligation to pay maintenance in terms of damage, because the recognition of a child as a person after Art. 1 I GG did not lay on the undertaking that obligation by parents.

In 2005, the Dutch Supreme Court fully upheld a wrongful life claim in the Netherlands' first wrongful life case ever.

== Ethics ==
Since wrongful life suits are a relatively new application of human rights, doctors and scholars have not come to consensus regarding their place in medical ethics. Others have objected to wrongful life claims on conceptual grounds, including the question of whether there exist rights and duties with regards to non-existent persons.

== See also ==
- Wrongful abortion
- Bioethics
