= ReSPECT process =

Emergency care and treatment plan

ReSPECT stands for Recommended Summary Plan for Emergency Care and Treatment. It is an emergency care and treatment plan (ECTP) used in parts of the United Kingdom, in which personalized recommendations for future emergency clinical care and treatment are created through discussion between health care professionals and a person (or their legal proxy or those close to them). These recommendations are then documented on a ReSPECT form.

The ReSPECT process is centred around conversations which aim to develop a shared understanding between the healthcare professional and a person about their condition, the outcomes the person values and those they fear and then how treatments and interventions (such as cardiopulmonary resuscitation (CPR), ventilation, intravenous medication, or admission to intensive care) fit into this. It supports the important principle of personalised care, moving away from a yes/no CPR decision to one that is more nuanced and patient centred.

A person's ReSPECT form includes recommendations about emergency treatments that could be helpful and should be considered, as well as those not wanted by or that would not work for them. It includes a recommendation about cardiopulmonary resuscitation (CPR), but that may be a recommendation that CPR is attempted, or a recommendation that it is not attempted.

ReSPECT forms are not legally binding but can be used by health care professionals to guide them when providing treatment for the person in a future emergency situation. As the ReSPECT process and form are designed to be recognised across different care settings (for example between hospitals, primary care, ambulance services, or care homes) and to cross geographical boundaries, the person does not have to undertake repeated conversations and discussions.

== Development ==
ReSPECT was developed after attendees at a 2014 summit at the Royal Society of Medicine on Do Not Attempt Cardiopulmonary Resuscitation (DNACPR) decisions in the UK criticised the variability and problematic practice linked to standalone DNACPR decisions. In particular DNACPR decisions were not routinely considered, were often poorly discussed or not discussed at all, and were misunderstood to mean that other care should be withheld. Alternative approaches had been developed internationally including Physician Orders for Life-Sustaining Treatment (POLST) for those approaching the end of their lives. One such approach, which contextualised the CPR decision within overall goals of care, the Universal Form of Treatment Options (UFTO), was found to address many of the issues associated with standalone DNACPR decisions. This data was presented to the UK Government's Health Select Committee who recommended that "the Government review the use of DNACPR orders in acute care settings, including whether resuscitation decisions should be considered in the context of overall treatment plans" and suggested standardising the recording mechanisms for the NHS in England. The Department of Health responded positively to this recommendation for improved processes focused on patient goals. In 2015 it documented that a working group had been established "to develop a national form that records decisions about CPR and other life-sustaining treatment in the context of a broader plan". Development of the ReSPECT process involved a review of literature, a national consultation, interviews with healthcare professionals and members of the public, a workshop with patients and public, and a usability trial.

== Usage ==
The ReSPECT process is used in around 70% of counties in England and in some areas of Scotland. In the UK, 21% of hospitals had adopted ReSPECT by December 2019. ReSPECT is the fastest growing ECTP in the UK, as many hospitals move away from using standalone DNACPR forms,. It is recommended in policy and guidance documents for doctors. Some NHS hospitals in need of improvement are required to ensure that staff are competent in using ReSPECT.

== Covid-19 ==
In 2020 it emerged that blanket DNACPR orders had been applied to UK care home residents during the COVID-19 pandemic, leading to concerns that people's individual circumstances had not been assessed and the person concerned was not involved in the decision making. These blanket orders were investigated by the Care Quality Commission, who cited ReSPECT as one of the best practice approaches in their interim report, because having conversations to understand patients' wishes about resuscitation is particularly important in the pandemic.

== Evaluation ==
A pilot of the ReSPECT process in NHS Forth Valley conducted in 2017–19, found that it led to multiple improvements. Patients and carers felt more involved in decision-making and rated the process positively (80% rating their experience as excellent and 20% as good), and staff were better able to access the information to inform decision-making in an emergency.

A wider evaluation of the use of ReSPECT in hospitals in England, during the early stages of adoption found the following:

- Hospital-based healthcare professionals prioritised ReSPECT conversations with patients whom they identified as terminally ill or anticipated were at imminent risk of deterioration. A move towards a more holistic approach in terms of treatment recommendations and conversations was observed. However, a central component of many conversations focused on situations where CPR attempts were not recommended.
- Emergency care treatment planning conversations are often complex and need to draw together patients' preferences and values within a framework of clinical judgement.
- Conversations were easier for patients, their family, and health care professionals if patients had thought about these things in advance and discussed this with their family.
- Patients (and / or those close the patient) were involved in making most but not all emergency care treatment plans. The ReSPECT supporting materials were rarely used during decision making. Involvement of patients usually focused on asking about their preferences for specific treatments or explaining recommendations. It was rarer for patients to be asked about their values and preferences, and for these to influence recommendations.
- Recommendations on ReSPECT forms completed in hospital sometimes are not helpful when future decisions are made in the community.
- ReSPECT conversations take time to do properly and so may not happen or be done well if there is limited time because of staff shortages or a busy ward environment.
