= New York State Task Force on Life and the Law =

The New York State Task Force on Life and the Law is a multidisciplinary advisory body formed to study and recommend public policies for New York State on bioethical issues.

From 1985 through 2016, the task force issued reports with policy recommendations on a broad range of bioethical topics, including brain death, do-not-resuscitate (DNR) orders, health care proxies, surrogate decision-making, the allocation of organs for transplantation, surrogacy, medical aid-in-dying, genetic testing and screening, the allocation of ventilators in a pandemic, and research involving human subjects who lack capacity.

Many of the task force's recommendations were enacted into New York State laws, promulgated as regulations, or cited in judicial decisions. Task force reports have also influenced the practice of health care professionals and institutions in New York and beyond, and are widely referenced in books and journals on medicine, law and ethics.

== Formation ==
The task force was formed in 1984 by executive order of Governor Mario M. Cuomo. Governor Cuomo noted several bioethical policy issues that were of great public concern in New York, including brain death, end-of-life decisions for severely disabled newborns, and do-not-resuscitate orders. He recognized the multidisciplinary nature of these issues, and concluded that an advisory body, composed of members with diverse disciplines, backgrounds and viewpoints, might help reach a consensus on policy recommendations. A prominent and then-recent precedent for this approach was the President's Commission for the Study of Ethical Problems in Medicine and Biomedical and Behavioral Research.

The executive order called for a body of 23 members appointed by the Governor and chaired by NYS Health Commissioner. The commissioner at the time was David Axelrod, M.D., a highly regarded public health official. The initial task force members were persons prominent in medicine, nursing, law, philosophy and ethics, civil rights and religion. The task force first met in December 1984 to begin to craft a public policy on do-not-resuscitate orders.

== Task force reports ==
Between 1986 and 2016, the task force studied and issued reports and recommendations on a broad range of bioethical issues. Its key reports, organized by category, were as follows:

=== Allocation of ventilators in a pandemic ===
- Allocation of Ventilators in an Influenza Pandemic: Planning Document (2007)
- Ventilator Allocation Guidelines (2015)

=== Dietary supplements ===
- Dietary Supplements: Balancing Consumer Choice & Safety (2005)

=== End-of-life decisionmaking / decisions for incapable patients ===
- Do Not Resuscitate Orders (1986)
- The Determination of Death (1986)
- Life-Sustaining Treatment: Making Decisions and Appointing a Health Care Agent (1987)
- When Others Must Choose: Deciding for Patients Without Capacity (1992)
- When Death is Sought: Assisted Suicide and Euthanasia in the Medical Context (1994)
- Recommendation Regarding the Extension of the Family Health Care Decisions Act to Include Hospice (2010)
- Guidelines for Determining Brain Death (2011)
- Recommendations for Extending the Family Health Care Decisions Act to Medicare and/or Medicaid-Certified and State-Licensed Agencies, Programs, and Settings (2013)
- Recommendations for Amending the Family Health Care Decisions Act to Include Health Care Decisions for Persons with Developmental Disabilities and Patients in or Transferred from Mental Health Facilities (2016) (Special Advisory Committee Report approved by the task force).

=== Genetic testing and genomic medicine ===
- Genetic Testing and Screening in the Age of Genomic Medicine (2000)

=== Human subjects research ===
- Report and Recommendations for Research With Human Subjects Who Lack Capacity (2014)

=== Organ and tissue procurement, allocation and transplantation ===
- The Required Request Law (1986)
- Transplantation in New York State: The Procurement and Distribution of Organs and Tissues (1988).

=== Reproductive and beginning-of-life Issues ===
- Fetal Extrauterine Survivability (1988)
- Surrogate Parenting: Analysis and Recommendations for Public Policy (1988)
- Assisted Reproductive Technologies: Analysis and Recommendations for Public Policy (1998)
- Revisiting Surrogate Parenting: Analysis and Recommendations for Public Policy on Gestational Surrogacy (2016)

Various task force reports are available, in booklet and or electronic format, in public libraries (including the New York State Library and the New York City Public Library), as well as in the libraries of law schools, medical and nursing schools, bioethics programs and universities.

The Empire State Bioethics Consortium now provides access on its website to electronic versions of nearly all of the task force's work.

== Impact on laws, regulations and court decisions ==
Task force reports and recommendations have been highly influential. A notable number of the task force's recommendations were adopted in whole or part as New York statutes or regulations. For example, task force proposals resulted in New York's Do Not Resuscitate Law; Health Care Proxy Law, Family Health Care Decisions Act, a law on the allocation of organs and the formation of a Transplant Council and a NYS Department of Health regulation recognizing brain death. A 1988 task force report led to a law restricting commercial surrogate parenting arrangements; however, a 2016 task force report called for legalizing and regulating gestational surrogacy, and a law reflecting that proposal was enacted in 2020. The task force report on the allocation of ventilators in a pandemic did not call for any changes in law, but influenced the policies of hospitals during the covid pandemic.

Proposals by the task force have also been adopted in states other than New York. Massachusetts and Vermont enacted laws based on the task force's health care proxy proposal; Georgia adopted a do-not-resuscitate order law based on the task force's do-not-resuscitate order proposal.

Task force reports have been cited and relied upon as an authority in many court decisions, including opinions of the United States Supreme Court and the New York State Court of Appeals. They also are referenced in numerous legal, medical and bioethical books and articles.

Many newspaper editorials address task force proposals, including over a dozen supportive New York Times editorials.

The impact of task force reports has been especially pronounced in New York policies regarding end-of-life decisions. Prior to the task force's work, brain death was not legally recognized, DNR orders were of doubtful legality, patients had no ability to appoint a health care agent, and there were no clear rules about who could make decisions for a patient who lacked capacity, or on what basis. Those issues are now largely resolved along the lines proposed by the task force, with policies that are generally accepted and regarded as successful.

Beyond impacting public policy, task force reports influenced professional practices and institutional policies. Moreover, they both reflected and contributed to changes in culture from an era when, for instance, an advance directive was considered eccentric or avant-garde, to the present day when it is considered a document responsible adults should have in their personal papers.

== Opposition ==
The task force was formed to propose policies on controversial issues, so nearly every one of its recommendations encountered some opposition, and/or criticism post-adoption. For example:

- The 1986 proposal to recognize brain death was opposed by organizations that viewed it as an intellectually dishonest means to end life-sustaining treatment for comatose patients in violation of their civil and religious rights.
- The 1986 proposal to recognize the legality of DNR orders was opposed on one hand by organizations that argued that physicians should never be allowed to "give up" on dying patients, even if patients or families ask them to; and on the other hand by some medical groups and bioethicists as a heavy handed intrusion on the judgment of physicians.
- The 1987 proposal to allow adults to appoint a health care agent was criticized by proponents of living wills as a diversion from the perceived need for New York to adopt a living will law, as most other states had.
- The 1988 proposal to allow surrogate decision-making for end-of-life decisions was opposed by groups that believe it devalues life and jeopardizes vulnerable incapable patients.
- The 1988 proposal to prohibit commercial surrogacy was opposed by groups that believe infertile couples should have the option of surrogacy, while the 2016 proposal to legalize gestational surrogacy was opposed by groups that believe the practice of surrogacy amounts to immoral baby-selling and causes harm all parties involved.
- The 2015 guidelines on the allocation of ventilators in a pandemic pursued the goal of saving the most lives, and recommended using purely clinical criteria in furtherance of that goal. This triage-type approach, which reflected public input, necessarily involved assigning – and in acute care settings potentially re-assigning – scarce ventilators to save the most lives. Some bioethicists and advocacy groups contended that this approach unjustly disadvantages people with disabilities and minority groups, while other bioethicists disabused the disability critique. In 2020, two disabilities rights organizations sued the NYS Department of Health alleging that the guidelines violated their civil rights, but the lawsuit was dismissed on the ground that the guidelines were only a proposal, not Health Department policy.

In several instances, some task force members themselves voiced their opposition to task force recommendations. Several of the reports include a minority statement by one or more members.

In many instances, legislators or regulators modified task force proposals to take into account some of the opposition arguments. For example, New York's brain death regulation includes a provision, not in the task force's proposal, to require the reasonable accommodation of patients known to have a religious or conscience based objection to the brain death standard. New York's Family Health Care Decisions Act omits a task force's proposal to allow a physician and ethics review committee to make end-of-life decisions for a patient who lacks capacity and has no surrogate decisionmaker or health care agent, in circumstances where a surrogate could make such decision.

== Task force members ==
During its 35 active years, over 50 people were appointed as members of the task force. Task force members with Wikipedia entries are as follows, along with their affiliation as described in a task force report (when available):

- Adrienne Asch, Ph.D., M.S., director of the Center for Ethics at Yeshiva University and the Edward and Robin Milstein Professor of Bioethics
- The Right Rev. David Ball, Bishop, Episcopal Diocese of Albany
- Rabbi J. David Bleich, Professor of Talmud, Yeshiva University; Professor of Jewish Law and Ethics, Benjamin Cardozo School of Law
- Kathleen M. Boozang, J.D., dean and professor of law, Seton Hall University School of Law.
- Daniel Callahan, Ph.D., director, Hasting Center.
- Nancy Neveloff Dubler, LL.B., consultant for ethics, NYC Health & Hospitals Corp., professor emerita, Albert Einstein College of Medicine.
- Joseph J. Fins, M.D., M.A.C.P., E. William Davis Jr. M.D. Professor of Medical Ethics, Professor of Medicine and Chief, Division of Medical Ethics, Weill Medical College of Cornell University
- Abbe Gluck, director of the Solomon Center for Health Law and Policy at Yale Law School.
- Beatrix A. Hamburg, M.D., professor of psychiatry and pediatrics, Mt. Sinai School of Medicine
- Rabbi James Rudin, national director of interreligious affairs, American Jewish Committee

== Chairs and executive directors ==
Under the initial executive order, the New York State Commissioner of Health is the chair of the task force. Most health commissioners performed this task personally either all of much of the time. The commissioner/task force chairs through 2019 were David Axelrod, M.D. (1979–91), Mark Chassin, M.D. (1992–94); Barbara Ann DeBuono, M.D., (1995–98); Antonia C. Novello (1999–2006); Richard F. Daines (2007–2010); Nirav Shah, M.D. (2011–2015) and Howard Zucker, M.D. (2015–21).

Tracy E. Miller, J.D., was the initial executive director of the task force and served from 1985 to 1992. Successive executive directors were Tia Powell, M.D.; Carl Coleman, J.D.; Beth Roxland, J.D.; and Stuart C. Sherman. J.D.

== The task force since 2019 ==
The task force has not met since 2019. However, in 2022, Governor Kathy Hochul continued the executive order that created the task force. Accordingly, it exists, but is inactive.
