= End-of-life ethics =

Moral considerations for individuals near death

End-of-life ethics refers to the moral principles and considerations that guide decisions and actions related to the care of individuals who are terminally ill or approaching the end of their lives. This field of ethics addresses the complex issues that arise when medical, emotional, and personal values intersect, often requiring difficult decisions about life-sustaining treatments, palliative care, and the quality of life.

== Key principles ==
=== Autonomy ===
Respect for the patient's right to make decisions about their own care is a cornerstone of end-of-life ethics. This includes the right to accept or refuse treatment, even if those decisions may lead to a hastened death. Advance directives, such as living wills and healthcare proxies, are tools that allow patients to express their preferences in advance, ensuring their wishes are respected even if they become incapacitated.

=== Beneficence ===
The principle of beneficence in medical ethics obligates physicians to act in the best interests of patients, promoting their well-being and preventing harm. It encompasses moral duties such as protecting rights, assisting individuals with disabilities, and rescuing those in danger. Unlike nonmaleficence, which emphasizes avoiding harm, beneficence requires active efforts to improve patient welfare. While rooted in altruism and ethical responsibility, it also serves as a form of reciprocity for societal benefits granted to physicians, including subsidized education and professional privileges. Additionally, beneficence contributes to medical knowledge through patient care, learning, and research.

=== Nonmaleficence ===
Nonmaleficence is the ethical obligation of physicians to avoid causing harm to patients. This principle upholds moral rules such as not killing, causing pain, or depriving others of life's goods. Its practical application involves evaluating the benefits and burdens of treatments, avoiding overly burdensome interventions, and selecting the best course of action for the patient. Nonmaleficence is especially relevant in end-of-life care decisions, such as withholding or withdrawing life-sustaining treatments, and managing symptoms like pain. The doctrine of double effect justifies the use of appropriate medications, like opioids, to relieve suffering, even if they may cause unintended harm.

=== Justice ===
The fair distribution of healthcare resources is a critical consideration in end-of-life ethics. The ethical principle of justice emphasizes the fair distribution of healthcare resources and the impartial provision of medical services. Given the inherent limitations of medical resources, their allocation should be equitable and justifiable. The distribution of advanced medical therapies requires careful evaluation to prevent unnecessary use and ensure optimal resource utilization. Healthcare professionals have a moral duty to promote fairness in end-of-life care by advocating for appropriate treatment decisions. This responsibility can be effectively fulfilled through comprehensive education and an evidence-based understanding of improved treatment outcomes.

== Ethical dilemmas ==
=== Withholding and withdrawing treatment ===
End-of-life care presents ethical challenges, particularly regarding the withholding or withdrawal of treatment. When both patient and physician agree that further intervention offers no benefit, the course of action is clear, though sensitive communication is essential. Patient autonomy must be balanced against potential harm, resource allocation, and legal or professional constraints. Physicians are not obligated to provide treatments deemed futile or contrary to a patient's best interests. Ethical decision-making should consider legal frameworks, medical evidence, patient preferences, and available resources. Clear communication and coordination are crucial in ensuring ethically and clinically appropriate end-of-life care decisions.

=== Euthanasia and physician-assisted suicide ===
Euthanasia and physician-assisted suicide represent significant ethical challenges in end-of-life care. These practices are identified alongside other difficult medical decisions including resuscitation, mechanical ventilation, artificial nutrition and hydration, terminal sedation, and withholding or withdrawing treatments. Healthcare professionals navigate these complex situations guided by five ethical principles: autonomy, beneficence, nonmaleficence, fidelity, and justice. These ethical dilemmas emerge from the tension between medical technology's ability to prolong life and the goals of end-of-life care: alleviating suffering, optimizing quality of life until death, and providing comfort in death. Ethical decision-making must balance respecting patients' wishes while protecting the rights and dignity of all involved parties.

=== Palliative sedation ===
Palliative treatment in end-of-life care emphasizes patient autonomy, ethical decision-making, and effective communication. Medical professionals are required to balance respect for self-determination with considerations of patient well-being, potential harm, and resource allocation. Decisions to withhold or withdraw treatment are made when interventions are deemed futile or when their risks outweigh potential benefits. Clinically assisted nutrition and hydration are classified as medical treatments and may be discontinued if they no longer contribute to patient well-being. Cardiopulmonary resuscitation (CPR) is generally not recommended in terminal stages. The administration of opioids and sedatives is standard for symptom management and typically does not necessitate justification under the doctrine of double effect.

=== Futile treatment ===
Futile treatment in end-of-life care refers to medical interventions that sustain life without the prospect of meaningful recovery. Advances in medical technology have enabled life prolongation through artificial means, such as ventilators and feeding tubes, raising ethical concerns about resource allocation and the financial burden of care. Decision-making in such cases involves balancing the potential benefits against the burdens of treatment. The importance of autonomous decision-making and advance directives is emphasized in determining whether to continue or withdraw interventions. Ongoing medical advancements necessitate continued ethical discussions on the appropriateness and limits of life-sustaining treatments.

=== Advance directives ===
An advance directive allows individuals to document their healthcare decisions in case of future disability or terminal illness. It can be instructional (stating specific medical preferences) or proxy-based (appointing a decision-maker). This ensures autonomy in end-of-life care. Competent individuals can directly express their wishes, while incapacitated patients rely on family members as proxies. However, families may struggle to accurately represent the patient's preferences, influenced by emotional or financial factors. Ethical and legal concerns arise, requiring public education on patient rights and proper use of advance directives to ensure informed decision-making and compliance with legal standards.

== See also ==
- Assisted suicide
- Do not resuscitate
- Futile medical care
- Persistent vegetative state
- Right to die
- Sanctity of life
- Terminal sedation
