= Nancy Neveloff Dubler =

American bioethicist and attorney (1941–2024)

Nancy Neveloff Dubler (November 28, 1941 – April 14, 2024) was an American bioethicist and attorney, and a pioneer in the field of clinical bioethics mediation. She worked at Montefiore Medical Center in the Bronx from 1975 to 2008, where she founded and served as Director of the Bioethics Consultation Service, among the first of its kind in the country. Dubler is widely known in the field of bioethics for her clinical bioethics consultation and mediation work, her teaching and mentoring, her participation on public policy bodies, her numerous scholarly articles, and her two influential books, Bioethics Mediation: A Guide to Shaping Shared Solutions, co-authored with Carol Liebman; and Ethics on Call: Taking Charge of Life-and-Death Choices in Today's Health Care System, co-authored with David Nimmons.

== Background ==
Nancy Neveloff was born in Bayport, NY on November 28, 1941, where her family lived above the pharmacy they owned. She graduated from Barnard College, where she was elected president of student government on a platform calling for its dissolution. (She won, and in fact dissolved the student government.) She went on to Harvard Law School in 1964, where she was one of five women in a class of roughly 500 students. In 1967 she married Walter Dubler, an English professor at Lehman College. Dubler's first jobs after law school included positions at South Brooklyn Legal Services, the Vera Institute of Justice, and Bank Street College of Education.

== Contributions to bioethics consulting, education and mediation ==
In 1975, Dubler joined Montefiore Medical Center and Albert Einstein College of Medicine as Director of the Division of Legal and Ethical Issues in Health Care, where she remained until 2008. Dubler founded Montefiore's Bioethics Consultation Service in 1978, bringing a multi-disciplinary approach to assist patients, families and providers with difficult health care decisions and dispute resolution. The goal of the service is to clarify issues and reach decisions in ethical issues such as end-of-life decisions, decision-making capacity, treatment refusal, informed consent, confidentiality, safe discharge and provider conscientious objection. Dubler described the ethics consult service in her 1992 book, Ethics on Call: Taking Charge of Life-and-Death Choices in Today's Health Care System, co-authored with David Nimmons: "We sit with doctors and nurses, discuss and ask questions to clarify the issues, propose different ways to think about the situation, highlight the patients' rights, and work to give the tools they need to deal with patients and families."

Dubler made significant contributions to bioethics education. In 1995 she co-created, with the late historian David Rothman, the Einstein-Cardozo Certificate Program in Bioethics and the Medical Humanities, now the longest running bioethics educational program in the tri-state area, and among the earliest in the country. This year-long interdisciplinary program has trained roughly 1,000 health and legal professionals. The course draws on texts from fiction, history, law, medicine and other fields to broaden the perspective and challenge the assumptions of participants.

Over time Dubler increasingly argued that the techniques of mediation were the best way to balance the differing views of those faced with challenging medical decisions. She incorporated the teaching of bioethics mediation into the Certificate Program and mediation is now also taught in the Bioethics MS program at Einstein. With her colleague Carol Liebman of Columbia Law School, she co-authored Bioethics Mediation: A Guide to Shaping Shared Solutions in 2004. It is now the landmark text in the field and used nationally in teaching bioethics mediation. Its guidance repeatedly states Dubler and Liebman's goal for bioethics mediation, "to level the playing field."

Building on the work in Bioethics Mediation, Dubler authored "A Principled Resolution: The Fulcrum for Bioethics Mediation," published in 2011 in Duke Law School's journal, Law and Contemporary Problems. In the article Dubler lays out in detail the ethical foundation for mediating bioethics resolutions in challenging cases. She notes the challenge of balancing among three competing factors: limits imposed by law on medical professionals and institutions, the decision-making authority of patients and families, and power imbalances in modern hospitals.

Bioethics mediation, as practiced and advocated by Dubler, was not universally acclaimed. For instance, in 2005 a reviewer of Bioethics Mediation wrote that bioethics mediation was unduly legalistic, that it displaced the moral responsibility of the physician, and that “there was little unbiased evidence about its outcomes.” But hospitals, clinicians and ethicists have increasingly recognized its value and instituted the technique. As an ethics consultant wrote, “there is widespread agreement in the field of clinical ethics that all clinical ethics consultants can benefit from the strategies mediators employ in resolving conflicts, especially those infused with rancor or whose disputants have become entrenched or immovable.”

After stepping down from her leadership role at Montefiore and Einstein in 2008, Dubler became a consultant at New York City Health + Hospitals Corporation, New York City's public hospital group. She led a complex and years-long project of training health ethics consultants at each of the HHC medical facilities, and consulting on hospital ethics policies, including during the pandemic.

== Contributions to medical ethics public policies ==
Dubler influenced public policies on medical ethics through her participation in governmental and professional advisory bodies. During Bill Clinton's presidency, she co-chaired the Bioethics Committee of the White House Task Force on Health Care Reform. She also served on a multidisciplinary panel that recommended measures to stem the outbreak of tuberculosis in New York City in 1992.

Notably, Dubler served for many years as a member of the New York State Task Force on Life and the Law and contributed significantly to, among other work, Task Force reports on genetic testing and screening (2000); research with human subjects who lack capacity (2014); allocation of ventilators in a pandemic (2015); extending New York's Family Health Care Decisions Act to other settings and populations (2016); and legalizing gestational surrogacy (2016). Dubler also was a member of the Empire State Stem Cell Board.

Dubler authored or co-authored scores of articles and book chapters. Much of her written work calls for improvements in public policies on such matters as end-of-life decisions for unbefriended patients and nursing home residents, health care in prisons and jails, the promotion of conflict mediation, and standards for credentialing and privileging ethics consultants.

In her final years Dubler played a crucial role in the formation of the Empire State Bioethics Consortium, a state-wide group of bioethics professionals committed to sharing their expertise and improving bioethics policies and practices. She participated in the consortium's workgroup challenging the isolation of long-term care residents during the covid pandemic.

On May 13, 2024, NYC Health + Hospitals held its annual John B. Corser Memorial Symposium on "How the Life and Work of Nancy Dubler Have Shaped American Bioethics / Nancy Dubler and the Communitarian Approach to Family Centered Care." The conference, planned while Dubler was alive but was held a month after she died, examined Dubler's impact on bioethics policy, education, mediation, quality, advocacy and diversity.

== Personal life ==
Dubler was married to Walter Dubler for nearly sixty years, and they had two children and five grandchildren. Walter Dubler died less than six months after Nancy Dubler's death, on October 5, 2024.
