= Wrongful abortion =

The term wrongful abortion refers to an abortion that a pregnant woman undergoes as a result of negligent or malicious conduct by a physician or health care provider.

== Types of wrongful abortion ==
There are at least two archetypal cases of wrongful abortion:

=== Misinformation about pregnancy ===
In a case of the first type, a pregnant woman seeks medical counseling regarding the possible perils related to the continuance of her pregnancy. The adviser mistakenly maintains that the pregnancy is fraught with substantial risks for the woman, and she consequently decides to undergo an abortion. Later it is found that the information given by the adviser was wrong.

=== Misinformation about health of fetus ===
In a case of the second type, the woman seeks advice concerning the health and bodily integrity of her fetus (see genetic counseling, prenatal diagnosis), and decides to undergo an abortion after being told that the fetus is deformed or disabled. Here, too, it is eventually realized that the information was wrong.

== Analogous terms ==
=== Wrongful pregnancy/conception ===
"Wrongful abortion" is comparable to other types of birth-related malpractice. One category of birth-related malpractice consists of cases in which negligence by the defendant resulted in the birth of a healthy yet unwanted child. The negligence may manifest itself in the manufacture, provision, or installation of contraceptives; in the performance of vasectomy or tubal ligation; or in the carrying out of an abortion. These cases are usually labeled "wrongful pregnancy" (or "wrongful conception" in appropriate cases). In a way, they represent a mirror image of wrongful abortion cases, although they are not exact reflections. In cases of wrongful pregnancy, the doctor's negligence makes the fulfillment of the parents’ will impossible, while in wrongful abortion cases the doctor's negligence instigates, but does not necessitate, a decision that turns out to be inconsistent with such will.

=== Wrongful birth/life ===
Another category of birth-related malpractice, more closely related to wrongful abortion, consists of cases in which a woman seeks medical advice regarding the health of her fetus, and decides to conceive or to continue her pregnancy once the adviser maintains that the fetus will not be born with congenital disabilities, a statement that is later found to be incorrect. The parents’ cause of action for their resulting losses is labeled "wrongful birth," while the infant’s cause of action for their own losses is termed "wrongful life." Wrongful birth is a more accurate mirror image of wrongful abortion. The former deals with the non-prevention of the birth of an unwanted child, whereas the latter deals with the prevention of the birth of a wanted child. In both cases the defendant’s negligence does not make the fulfillment of the parent’s will physically impossible, but instigates a decision that turns out to be inconsistent with such will.

== See also ==
- Wrongful life
- Bioethics
