= Rights of the Terminally Ill Act =

Rights of the Terminally Ill Act may refer to:

- Rights of the Terminally Ill Act 1995, briefly legalising euthanasia in Australia's Northern Territory
- Uniform Rights of the Terminally Ill Act, dealing with withholding of life support in the United States

== See also ==
- Terminally Ill Adults (End of Life) Bill, in England and Wales
- Assisted Dying for Terminally Ill Adults (Scotland) Bill
