= Allow natural death =

Medical term

Allow Natural Death (AND) is a medical term defining the use of life-extending measures such as cardiopulmonary resuscitation (CPR). These orders emphasize patient comfort and pain management instead of life extension. Currently, American medical communities utilize "do not resuscitate," (DNR) orders to define patients' medical wishes. Those who propose to replace DNR with AND posit that DNR orders are ambiguous and require complex understanding between several parties, while AND orders are clearer. Proponents of replacing DNR with AND believe that AND terminology is more ethically conscientious DNR terminology. Research has been conducted regarding participant preference for AND vs. DNR terminology. The ease with which the terminology change can be practically incorporated depends on many factors such as costs and staff reeducation.

== DNR vs. AND ==
DNR orders range in the extent of life-saving measures to be avoided, from solely prohibiting the use of resuscitation to prohibiting any action seen as life extending. Because there are many parties involved in a patient's end of life care - significant others, family, personal doctors, specialists and nurses - DNR orders are not always completely clear, leaving open possible violation of the patient's wishes. DNR terminology was replaced in 2005 by the American Heart Association with Do Not Attempt Resuscitation (DNAR) in an effort to make clearer the meaning of the order. However, DNR remains the popularly understood and used term in the medical and layperson settings. AND is yet another phrase for similar orders, and implementing it involves a term change.

Those who propose to replace DNR orders with AND orders posit that AND is less ambiguous, clearly instructing medical personnel to not use any artificial, life extending measures. This would be especially helpful in regards to emergency care, when medical personnel who are unfamiliar with the patient must decide what medical practices should be used. Pros are that AND increases clarity on meaning and the choice of life or death. AND orders also don't use negative wording that could be confusing to interpret. Furthermore, proponents of AND claim that because it contains "death" in the title it is more clear to the patient and family exactly what the patient is agreeing to. Critics of AND claim it is simply the replacement of one ambiguous term with another. Cons include that death can be vague and CPR isn't mentioned in the phrase. Just as DNR particulars vary, so too would AND particulars vary. Thus, they argue that change would be ineffective.

== Ethics ==
AND terminology represents an ideology of patient care that emphasizes bodily autonomy and respect of the individual. This is in contrast to the terminology associated with DNR, or "do not resuscitate," which has been criticized for placing emphasis on potential negative outcomes associated with hospitalization, i.e. the act of "not" resuscitating is a conscious decision to "not" engage in life-extending care. Proponents of AND argue that, by "allowing" natural death, the provider is, instead, consciously deciding to engage in care; although such care is not life-extending, this form of care respects the wishes of patients to die peacefully and without suffering.

AND and DNR share similar ethical considerations with regards to end-of-life care. These considerations can involve the four main principles of biomedical ethics, including autonomy, beneficence, nonmaleficence, and justice. Autonomy can be thought of as a patient's right to self-determination and the right to decide what kind of care they should receive, which can be achieved through ANDs or DNRs. The principles of beneficence and nonmaleficence require that the healthcare providers are aware of their patient's AND and DNR statuses, and of their roles in that patient's end-of-life care. Lastly, the principle of justice refers to the obligation for healthcare providers to advocate for fair and appropriate treatment of their patients at the end of their lives, which requires abiding by the conditions expressed through AND and DNR.

In the cases of attempted suicide or medical mismanagement, there are questions around the meaning of what a "natural" death is. It is argued that in these cases, physicians should have the capability to revoke a patient's DNR or AND, though a wide consensus has yet to be reached.

== Studies and Outcomes ==
Most studies regarding AND are surveys based on hypothetical situations and are given to specific groups. One study gave a scenario regarding loved ones to nurses, nursing students, and people with no nursing background. Each group rated how likely they were to agree to end of life care when DNR or AND was used. Participants were significantly more likely to agree to end of life care when AND was used.

Another study found similar results when giving a scenario to 524 adults- end of life care was more accepted when AND was used.

However, when patients with cancer were given a scenario about how much time they had left to live (1 year, 6 months, or 1 month), the results were different. In two studies conducted by the same authors, there was no significant difference in choosing end of life care when AND or DNR was used.

Finally, an anonymous survey asked residents and doctors about their experience with end of life care after their hospital switched to using AND over DNR. A majority agreed that using AND improved discussions about end of life care and decreased the burden of decision making.

== Future Directions ==
There are barriers that exist in implementing "allow natural death". Some argue that costs will occur with the need to reeducate clinical staff and replace forms and edit electronic medical databases. People are looking into high-end care for when it comes to end of life decisions and AND can help provide more autonomy for patients.

== See also ==
- Letting die
- Coup de grace

== Bibliography ==
- Fan, S.-Y., Wang, Y.-W., & Lin, I.-M. (2018). Allow natural death versus do-not-resuscitate: Titles, information contents, outcomes, and the considerations related to do-not-resuscitate decision. BMC Palliative Care, 17(1). https://doi.org/10.1186/s12904-018-0367-4.
  - This is a peer-reviewed scientific journal, so it should be a reliable source. It covers the topic in some depth, so it's helpful in establishing notability.
- Miljković, M. D., Emuron, D., Rhodes, L., Abraham, J., & Miller, K. (2015). "allow natural death" versus "do not resuscitate": What do patients with advanced cancer choose? Journal of Palliative Medicine, 18(5), 457–460. https://doi.org/10.1089/jpm.2014.0369.
  - This is a peer-reviewed scientific journal, so it should be a reliable source. It covers the topic in some depth, so it's helpful in establishing notability.
- Wittmann-Price, Ruth; Celia, Linda M. (Nov–Dec 2010). "Exploring perceptions of "do not resuscitate" and "allowing natural death" among physicians and nurses". Holistic Nursing Practice. 24 (6): 333–337.
  - This is a peer-reviewed scientific journal, so it should be a reliable source. It is an observational study that was used to understand the differences in perception of the terms "allow natural death" and "do not resuscitate."
- Akdeniz, Melahat; Yardımcı, Bülent; Kavukcu, Ethem (2021). "Ethical considerations at the end-of-life care". SAGE open medicine. 9: 20503121211000918.
  - This is a peer-reviewed review article, so it should be a reliable source. It covers ethical considerations of end-of-life care, so it's helpful in providing context to the discussion of "allowing natural death."
- Knox, C., Vereb, J.A. (2005). "Allow Natural Death: A More Humane Approach to Discussing End-of-Life Directives". Journal of Emergency Nursing. 31 (6): 560-561. PMID 16308044
  - This is an history of AND vs. DNR and argues for use of AND in a reputable journal.
- Venneman, S. S., Narnor-Harris, P., Perish, M., Hamilton, M. (2007). ""Allow natural death" versus "do not resuscitate": three words that can change a life". Journal of Medical Ethics. 34 (1): 2-6.
  - This is a quantitative survey study in the Journal of Medical Ethics, which is a reputable and relevant source.
- Robinson, C., Kolesar, S., Boyko, M., Berkowitz, J., Calam, B., Collins, M. (2012). "Awareness of do-not-resuscitate orders". Canadian Family Physician. 58 (4): 229-233. PMID 22611610
  - This is a primary cross-sectional study in a peer-reviewed journal on patient awareness of DNR and how and when they would like to decide on how or whether to use one.
