= Tia Powell =

American psychiatrist and bioethicist

- Born: May 7, 1957 (age 69); Chevy Chase, Maryland
- Education: Harvard College (BA); Yale University (MD)
- Website: https://www.tiapowellmd.com/

External media

Audio
- How to Live a Joyful Life after a Dementia Diagnosis Ep. 42, Wisconsin Alzheimer's Disease Research Center, June 16, 2022

Video
- Einstein On: Clinical Bioethics: Dr. Tia Powell, December 11, 2012

Tia Powell is an American psychiatrist and bioethicist and author. She is currently working on a book about caregivers. She was for 15 years Director of the Montefiore-Einstein Center for Bioethics and of the Einstein Cardozo Master of Science in Bioethics Program, as well as a Professor of Clinical Epidemiology and Clinical Psychiatry at the Albert Einstein College of Medicine in The Bronx, New York. She holds the Trachtenberg Chair in Bioethics and is Professor of Epidemiology, Division of Bioethics, and Psychiatry. She was director of Clinical Ethics at Columbia-Presbyterian Hospital in New York City from 1992 to 1998, and executive director of the New York State Task Force on Life and the Law from 2004 to 2008.

Powell graduated from Harvard-Radcliffe College and Yale Medical School.

Powell has served on a number of committees for the Institute of Medicine, especially focusing on ethical issues related to dementia, aging, and public health disasters. She worked with the Institute of Medicine on 5 separate projects related to public health disasters, including as co-chair of the IOM report on antibiotics for anthrax attack. She has bioethics expertise in public policy, dementia, consultation, end of life care, decision-making capacity, bioethics education and the ethics of public health disasters.

As executive director of the New York State Task Force on Life and the Law, Powell initiated development of guidelines for the allocation of ventilators in New York State, in the event of a crisis. With Guthrie S. Birkhead, Powell co-chaired a 2007 workgroup that developed draft guidelines for New York State for the allocation of ventilators in the event of an influenza pandemic. This became the foundation for New York State's 2015 Ventilator Allocation Guidelines.

== Dementia Reimagined ==
In 2019, Powell published Dementia Reimagined: Building a Life of Joy and Dignity from Beginning to End through Penguin Random House. Dementia Reimagined combines medicine and memoir, discussing both the history of dementia and Alzheimer's disease and the emotional and ethical issues involved in dealing with it in an elderly family member. One of the historical figures she discusses is Solomon Fuller, a black doctor whose research at the turn of the twentieth century anticipated important aspects of current medical knowledge about dementia.

== Selected publications ==
- Powell, Tia (2022). "Bioethical Issues in Dementia and Alzheimer's Disease". In Reynolds, Joel Michael; Wieseler, Christine (eds.). The disability bioethics reader. New York London: Routledge. ISBN 9780367220020.
- Dike, Charles C.; Briz, Laura; Fadus, Matthew; Martinez, Richard; May, Catherine; Milone, Richard; Nesbit-Bartsch, Ariana; Powell, Tia; Witmer, Ashley; Brendel, Rebecca Weintraub (August 2022). "Religion, Spirituality, and Ethics in Psychiatric Practice". The Journal of Nervous and Mental Disease. 210 (8): 557–563. doi:10.1097/NMD.0000000000001505. ISSN 0022-3018. PMID 35344979. S2CID 247776852.
- Powell, Tia (September 2022). "Running Toward Disasters: One Bioethicist's Experience in Translational Ethics". Perspectives in Biology and Medicine. 65 (4): 622–628. doi:10.1353/pbm.2022.0053. ISSN 1529-8795. PMID 36468390.
- Zhang, Kaleena; Shi, Marc; Powell, Tia; Chuang, Elizabeth (May 2022). "Primary and Specialist-Level Palliative Care during the spring 2020 COVID-19 Surge: A Single-Center Experience in the Bronx". American Journal of Hospice and Palliative Medicine. 39 (5): 598–602. doi:10.1177/10499091211034416. ISSN 1049-9091. PMC 8922160. PMID 34313146.
- Powell, Tia (2019). Dementia reimagined: building a life of joy and dignity from beginning to end. New York: Avery, an imprint of Penguin Random House. ISBN 978-0735210905.
- Powell, Tia (March 19, 2019). "Solomon Carter Fuller: Remembering a forgotten dementia researcher". Psychology Today.
- Powell, T; Christ, KC; Birkhead, GS (March 2008). "Allocation of ventilators in a public health disaster". Disaster Medicine and Public Health Preparedness. 2 (1): 20–6. doi:10.1097/DMP.0b013e3181620794. PMID 18388654. S2CID 34802808.
- New York State Task Force on Life and the Law (March 15, 2007). Allocation of Ventilators in an Influenza Pandemic: Planning Document – Draft for Public Comment (PDF). New York State Department of Health. Archived from the original (PDF) on 2011-09-27.
- Sloan, RP; Bagiella, E; Powell, T (February 1999). "Religion, spirituality, and medicine". The Lancet. 353 (9153): 664–667. doi:10.1016/s0140-6736(98)07376-0. ISSN 0140-6736. PMID 10030348. S2CID 36568822.
