= Family Health Care Decisions Act =

New York law

The Family Health Care Decisions Act (the FHCDA) is a New York State statute that enables a patient's family member or close friend to make health care treatment decisions if the patient lacks capacity and did not make the decision in advance or appoint a health care agent. It also creates a bedside process to determine patient incapacity; a priority list for the selection of the decision-maker; and ethical standards for making decisions, including life-sustaining treatment decisions. In short, it empowers a surrogate decision-maker for health care decisions for incapable patients in New York.

Each day thousands of health care decisions for incapable patients are made in New York hospitals, nursing homes and hospice programs in accordance with the standards and requirements of the FHCDA.

== Background ==
The FHCDA is based on recommendations of the New York State Task Force on Life and the Law in a 1992 report, When Others Must Choose: Deciding for Patients Who Lack Capacity. The Task Force is a multidisciplinary body created in 1984 by Governor Mario M. Cuomo to recommend public policies on bioethical issues, including decisions for patients who lack capacity. Previously, the Task Force issued reports on, among other topics, brain death, do not resuscitate orders and health care proxies – all of which led to new laws or regulations.

Until the FHCDA was enacted in 2010, the law in New York on life-sustaining-treatment could be summarized in three principles:

First, an adult patient with capacity had a broad right to choose to forgo life-sustaining treatment.

Second, life-sustaining treatment could be withdrawn or withheld from an adult patient who lacked capacity if the adult, prior to losing capacity, either left "clear and convincing evidence" of a prior decision to forgo such treatment under the circumstances, or appointed a health care agent.

The third principle is the converse of the second principle: Life-sustaining treatment could not be withdrawn or withheld from an adult patient who lacks capacity if the adult did not leave "clear and convincing evidence" of a prior decision to forgo such treatment under the circumstances, or appoint a health care agent. This third principle was broadly criticized as a source of great suffering. In many cases involving a dying patient, the family believed that the patient would prefer comfort care to invasive treatment; the attending physician and the health care team agreed with that approach; even an ethics committee or judge agreed with that approach. But New York's clear and convincing evidence standard mandated the continuation of the unwanted treatment.

The Task Force collected data, reviewed laws in other states, and read and heard a range of medical, ethical and religious view. In 1992 it issued its report, proposing a surrogate decision-making statute for New York.

Assemblymember Richard N. Gottfried, Chair of the NYS Assembly Health Committee, introduced a bill based on the Task Force's proposal in 1993; he named later versions of his bill the "Family Health Care Decisions Act." Gottfried became a tenacious champion for the bill over many years. Senate Health Chair Kemp Hannon also sponsored versions of the bill for many years.

The FHCDA bill was controversial, with numerous organizations and individuals advocating in support or opposition. Opponents, notably the NYS Catholic Conference of Bishops and Agudath Israel, an orthodox Jewish organization, generally contended that the bill did not adequately respect the sanctity of life or protect vulnerable patients from decisions that were against the patient's wishes. One of the Task Force members, Rabbi David Bleich, wrote a dissenting statement emphasizing that surrogate decision-making, unlike the patient's advance directive or appointment of a health care agent, was not an extension of autonomy, and was "stark abnegation of preservation of life as a value in and of itself". The Catholic Conference expressed particular concern about the absence of language to protect a fetus when the patient is a pregnant woman. However, surprisingly, NYS Right to Life ultimately supported the bill.

Over time, and particularly in light of the Terri Schiavo case and recognition that New York was one of only a few states that did not allow surrogate decision-making, a general consensus emerged in the public and the Legislature on the need to authorize surrogate decision-making in New York. Even so, the bill was gridlocked for many years by two issues: whether the surrogate priority list should include the category "domestic partner" in order to empower a patient's same-sex partner, and whether the law should specify, in cases where the patient is a pregnant woman, that the surrogate must consider the impact of the decision on the fetus. In large part because of these two irreconcilable issues, the bill languished for seventeen years, with separate versions in the Republican-controlled Senate and Democratic-controlled Assembly. Finally in 2010, Democrats gained control of both houses of the New York State Legislature and Democratic Senator Thomas Duane became Senate Health Chair. The two issues in dispute were resolved in favor of the Assembly bill approach, language was finalized and the bill passed. Governor Paterson signed the bill into law at a ceremony at Albany Memorial Hospital and it became effective in 2011.

== Key Provisions ==
The FHCDA's key provisions are found in NYS Public Health Law Article 29-cc. Those provisions, in summary, are:

- Applicability. The FHCDA applies to decisions in hospitals and nursing homes and, as a result of a 2015 amendment, in hospice programs. The FHCDA does not apply to end of life decisions for patients with developmental or intellectual disabilities, which are governed by the "Health Care Decisions Act for People with Developmental Disabilities." It also does not apply if the patient made a decision personally before losing capacity, or appointed a health care agent.
- Determination of Incapacity. The FHCDA creates a bedside process to determine whether a patient lacks capacity to make health care decisions, largely relying upon the attending practitioner. A finding of incapacity triggers the authority of a surrogate decision-maker. If the patient objects to the determination, a court must make the determination through a special proceeding or guardianship proceeding.
- Identification of the Surrogate. The FHCDA creates a priority list of potential surrogate decision-makers, depending on who is available, willing and competent to act. It starts with a court appointed guardians if there is one, then moves through various categories of relatives, i.e., spouse, adult son or daughter, adult sibling. A final category is "close friend", which requires the friend to attest to a bona fide close relationship with the patient.
- Decision-making standard. In general a surrogate must make a decision based on the patient's wishes if known (a subjective standard), or if not reasonably known based on the patient's best interests (an objective standard). But there is no longer any requirement to establish the patient's wishes by "clear and convincing evidence".
- Patients without surrogates. There is a bedside process to secure consent to treatment, or a decision to withdraw or withhold life-sustaining treatment, for a patient who lacks capacity and does not have any family member or friend to act as surrogate decision-maker.
- Ethics Review Committees. The FHCDA requires New York hospitals, nursing homes and hospice programs to have or participate in an ethics review committee. The ERC's role is to try to resolve disputes and, in limited instances, to review and approve decisions.

== Proposals to Extend the FHCDA ==
Proposals have been made by the Task Force on Life and the Law and others to extend the scope of the FHCDA in four respects:

- to make it apply to hospice programs. This was accomplished by an amendment in 2015;
- to make it apply to DNR orders for people in psychiatric hospitals and mental health units. This was accomplished by amendments in 2023 and 2024;
- to make it apply in ambulatory and home care settings. This has not been accomplished; and
- to make to apply to end-of-life decisions people with developmental or intellectual disabilities and supersede the separate law that governs such decisions for that population. This has not been accomplished.

There are also various other proposals to amend the FHCDA, as well as guidance to professionals on how to interpret and follow it. Medical Orders for Life-Sustaining Treatment (MOLST) forms track the requirements of the FHCDA.

== See also ==
- Advance health care directive - Living Will
- Uniform Rights of the Terminally Ill Act
- Do Not Resuscitate
- Patient refusal of nutrition and hydration
- MOLST
