= Cattanach v Melchior =

Judgement of the High Court of Australia

- Court: High Court of Australia
- Full case name: Cattanach & Anor v Melchior & Anor
- Decided: 16 July 2003
- Citations: [2003] HCA 38; (2003) 215 CLR 1

Case history
- Prior action: Melchior v Cattanach & Anor [2001] QCA 246; Queensland Court of Appeal
- Subsequent action: none

Court membership
- Judges sitting: Gleeson CJ, McHugh, Gummow, Kirby, Hayne, Callinan, Heydon JJ

Case opinions
- (4:3) Appeal dismissed. Benefits received by having a child not legally relevant to the head of damage that compensates for cost of raising and maintaining the child.

Cattanach v Melchior [2003] HCA 38; (2003) 215 CLR 1, was a significant case decided in the High Court of Australia regarding the tort of negligence in a medical context. It was held by a majority of the High Court (by McHugh, Gummow, Kirby and Callinan JJ; Gleeson CJ, Hayne and Heydon JJ dissenting) that the negligent doctor could be held responsible for the costs of raising and maintaining a healthy child.

== Facts ==
Mrs Kerry Anne Melchior had seen the obstetrician and gynaecologist Stephen Alfred Cattanach, and asked for a tubal ligation procedure to be performed on her, citing financial inability to support a third child. She recalled having one ovary removed when she was fifteen years of age and that her fallopian tube had at that time also been removed. While performing the operation Dr Cattanach could see no evidence of a second fallopian tube and so assumed that Mrs Melchior's recollection was accurate.

Some time after the operation Mrs Melchior became pregnant by her husband, Craig Melchior and gave birth to the healthy baby Jordan. Kerry Anne and Craig Melchior brought actions against, inter alia, Dr Cattanach for negligence. Mrs Melchior applied for damages for loss and damage caused by pregnancy and birth, Mr Melchior applied for damages for loss of consortium and they jointly applied for damages for the cost of raising and maintaining the child to majority.

== Supreme Court of Queensland ==
In the Supreme Court of Queensland, Holmes J held that the failure of Dr Cattanach to warn the Melchiors of their capacity to conceive and his negligent advice caused them to become parents of an unplanned child. Mrs Melchior was awarded $103,672.39 for loss and damage caused by pregnancy, Mr Melchior was awarded $3,000 for loss of consortium and they were jointly awarded $105,249.33 for the cost of raising and maintaining the child.

The appeal of Dr Cattanach and the State of Queensland (which was vicariously liable for Dr Cattanach's negligence) to the Queensland Court of Appeal (McMurdo P, Davies and Thomas JJA) was dismissed by a majority, Thomas JA dissenting. Special leave was later granted for the defendants to appeal to the High Court exclusively on the issue of the award of damages for the cost of raising and maintaining a healthy child.

== High Court ==
The State of Queensland and the defendant Dr Cattanach argued that the birth of a healthy child was not a harm and therefore could not be compensated; that the damages do not arise from a physical injury to the plaintiff; that such damages would open the floodgates to lawsuits; and that the benefit of raising a child may be greater than the cost, though it is immeasurable. Intervening by leave were also the Solicitors-General for Western Australia and South Australia, arguing the same lines.

However, the majority of the High Court, consisting of McHugh and Gummow JJ in a joint judgment, Kirby and Callinan JJ, found that damages for the costs of raising the child were recoverable. Within the majority, McHugh and Gummow JJ and Kirby J all found, contrary to the majority of the Queensland Court of Appeal, that the claim for the costs of child-rearing was not one for pure economic loss, but rather flowed logically from the injury sustained by Mrs Melchior as a result of Dr Cattanach's negligence.[12] Justices McHugh and Gummow pointed out that it defied logic to allow the recovery of damages for medical expenses and for the pain and suffering of childbirth, but not for the costs of raising the child.[13] Only Callinan J agreed with the Queensland majority that this was a case of pure economic loss.[14] Justices McHugh and Gummow stated that the damage claimed was not the child or the parent–child relationship, but rather the burden of the legal and moral responsibilities arising from parenthood.[15] Justice Kirby stated that the injury was constituted by the economic harm rather than the birth of the child.[16]

== Legislative reform ==
In November 2003 the Queensland parliament passed the Justice and Other Legislation Amendment Act 2003. Section 41 of that Act inserted new sections 49A and 49B into the Civil Liability Act 2003. These sections prevent a court from awarding damages for a financial loss suffered in rearing a healthy child. This effectively prevents a decision awarding the same damages that were awarded in Cattanach v Melchior being awarded again in Queensland - however, the amendment does not prevent a successful Wrongful Birth claim.

Section 71 of the New South Wales Civil Liability Act 2002 has similar effect.

Further, the Civil Liability Act 1936 (SA) Section 67 again has a very similar effect, though is expressed slightly differently.
