= Futile medical care =

Medical treatment with no reasonable hope of benefit

Futile medical care is the continued provision of medical care or treatment to a patient when there is no reasonable hope of a cure or benefit.

Some doctors suggest discontinuing the use of any treatment that has not been shown to provide a measurable benefit. Futile care discontinuation is distinct from euthanasia because euthanasia involves active intervention to end life, while withholding futile medical care does not encourage or hasten the natural onset of death.

However, medical futility is highly controversial because it sits at the intersection of life-or-death decisions, deep personal values, and professional boundaries. There is no universal agreement on when a life is no longer worth prolonging.

== Definition ==
Medical futility is generally divided into two main categories: quantitative (based on numerical probability) and qualitative (based on the quality of the outcome). The examples of quantitative futility are continuing cardiopulmonary resuscitation on a patient with widespread, terminal cancer whose organs are already failing, or administering a high-toxicity chemotherapy to a patient when clinical data show almost zero survival rate for their specific condition. The example of qualitative futility is keeping a patient in a persistent vegetative state for years with zero chance of regaining consciousness.

Many controversies surrounding the concept of futile care center around how futility is assessed differently in specific situations rather than on arguments in favor of providing futile care per se. It is difficult to determine when a particular course of action may fall under the definition of futile medical care because it is difficult to define the point at which there is no further benefit to intervention (varying from case to case). For instance, a cancer patient may be willing to undergo more chemotherapy with a very expensive medication for the possible benefit of a few weeks of life, while medical staff, insurance company staff and close relatives may believe this is a futile course of care. Examples also include doing surgery on an elderly or terminally ill person who is unlikely to benefit from the surgery, which some surgeons have called "autopsies under anesthesia".

A 2010 survey of more than 10,000 physicians in the United States found respondents divided on the issue of recommending or giving "life-sustaining therapy when [they] judged that it was futile", with 23.6% saying they would do so, 37% saying they would not, and 39.4% selecting "It depends".

== Futile medical care and euthanasia ==
The difficulty with the issue of non-treatment lies in the borderline with euthanasia, which is punishable by law in most countries. Euthanasia designates a practice (action or omission) whose aim is to intentionally bring about the death of a person, in principle suffering from an incurable disease which inflicts intolerable suffering, particularly by a doctor or under his or her control. In France, the case of accident victim Vincent Lambert, who spent 11 years in a persistent vegetative state before dying in 2019, has been qualified as unreasonable obstinacy by his doctor and by several court rulings, but has remained a source of legal proceedings and societal debate for several years over whether stopping treatment would be euthanasia or not.

In France, the Code of Medical Ethics rejects the practice of acharnement thérapeutique (relentless therapy), while advocating palliative care. The aim of palliative care is not to hasten a patient's death, but to relieve pain, even if, to do so, caregivers sometimes use doses of analgesics or painkillers that risk bringing the moment of death closer.

Denmark recognizes patients' right to refuse treatment.

== Issues in futile care considerations ==
The issue of futile care in clinical medicine generally involves two questions. The first concerns the identification of those clinical scenarios where the care would be futile. The second concerns the range of ethical options when care is determined to be futile.

=== Assessment of futility in a clinical context ===
Clinical scenarios vary in degrees and manners of futility. While scenarios like providing ICU care to the brain-dead patient or the anencephalic patient when organ harvesting is not possible or practical are easily identifiable as futile, many other situations are less clear.

A study in the United Kingdom with more than 180,000 patients aimed to define a timeframe for quantitative futility in emergency laparotomy and investigate predictors of futility using the United Kingdom National Emergency Laparotomy Audit (NELA) database. A two-stage methodology was used; stage one defined a timeframe for futility using an online survey and steering group discussion; stage two applied this definition to patients enrolled in NELA December 2013–December 2020 for analysis. Futility was defined as all-cause mortality within 3 days of emergency laparotomy. Results showed that quantitative futility occurred in 4% of patients (7442/180,987) and median age was 74 years. Significant predictors of futility included age, arterial lactate and cardiorespiratory co-morbidity. Frailty was associated with a 38% increased risk of early mortality and surgery for intestinal ischaemia was associated with a two times greater chance of futile surgery. These findings suggest that quantitative futility after emergency laparotomy is associated with quantifiable risk factors available to decision-makers preoperatively and should be incorporated into shared decision-making discussions with extremely high-risk patients.

Another practical clinical example that often occurs in large hospitals is the decision about whether or not to continue resuscitation when the resuscitation efforts following an in-hospital cardiac arrest have been prolonged. A 1999 study in the Journal of the American Medical Association has validated an algorithm developed for these purposes.

As medical care improves and affects more and more chronic conditions, questions of futility have continued to arise. A relatively recent response to this difficulty in the United States is the introduction of the hospice concept, in which palliative care is initiated for someone thought to be within about six months of death. Numerous social and practical barriers exist that complicate the issue of initiating hospice status for someone unlikely to recover.

=== Options for futile care and futile care as a commodity ===
Another issue in futile care theory concerns the range of ethical options when care is determined to be futile. Some people argue that futile clinical care should be a market commodity that should be able to be purchased just like cruise vacations or luxury automobiles, as long as the purchaser of the clinical services has the necessary funds and as long as other patients are not being denied access to clinical resources as a result. In this model, Baby K would be able to get ICU care (primarily ventilatory care) until funding vanished. With rising medical care costs and an increase in extremely expensive new anti-cancer medications, the similar issues of equity often arise in treatment of end-stage cancer.

=== Options with regard to futile care ===
If futile care is not desired, a signed and notarized do not resuscitate (DNR) order can prevent these futile actions and treatments from being performed.

If futile care is desired, an advance directive can express wishes to receive any and all care that has a chance of prolonging life.

== See also ==
- Texas Futile Care Law
- Right to die
- Hospice
- Slow code
