= Medical Orders for Life-Sustaining Treatment =

MOLST is an acronym for Medical Orders for Life-Sustaining Treatment. The MOLST Program is an initiative to facilitate end-of-life medical decision-making in New York State, Connecticut, Massachusetts, Rhode Island, and Maryland, that involves use of the MOLST form. Most other U.S. states have similar initiatives, such as Physician Orders for Life-Sustaining Treatment. In New York state, the MOLST form is a New York State Department of Health form (DOH-5003). MOLST is for patients such as a terminally ill patient, whether or not treatment is provided. For this example, assume the patient retains medical decision-making capacity and wants to die naturally in a residential setting, not in the intensive-care unit of a hospital on a ventilator with a feeding tube. Using MOLST, with the informed consent of the patient, the patient's doctor could issue medical orders for life-sustaining treatment, including any or all of the following medical orders: provide comfort measures (palliative care) only; do not attempt resuscitation (allow natural death); do not intubate; do not hospitalize; no feeding tube; no IV fluids; do not use antibiotics; no dialysis; no transfusions. The orders should be honored by all health care providers in any setting, including emergency responders who are summoned by a 9-1-1 telephone call after the patient loses medical decision-making capacity.

== MOLST Program in New York State ==
The MOLST Program is a New York State initiative that facilitates end-of-life medical decision-making. One goal of the MOLST Program is to ensure that decisions to withhold or withdraw life-sustaining treatment are made in accordance with the patient's wishes, or, if the patient's wishes are not reasonably known and cannot with reasonable diligence be ascertained, in accordance with the patient's best interests.

Patricia "Pat" Bomba, MD, spearheaded the MOLST Program since its inception. Dr. Bomba was a Vice President at Excellus BlueCross BlueShield.

Information about the MOLST Program can be found on the websites that Excellus BlueCross BlueShield maintains called www.compassionandsupport.org, and www.molst.org.

=== Legal basis in New York State ===
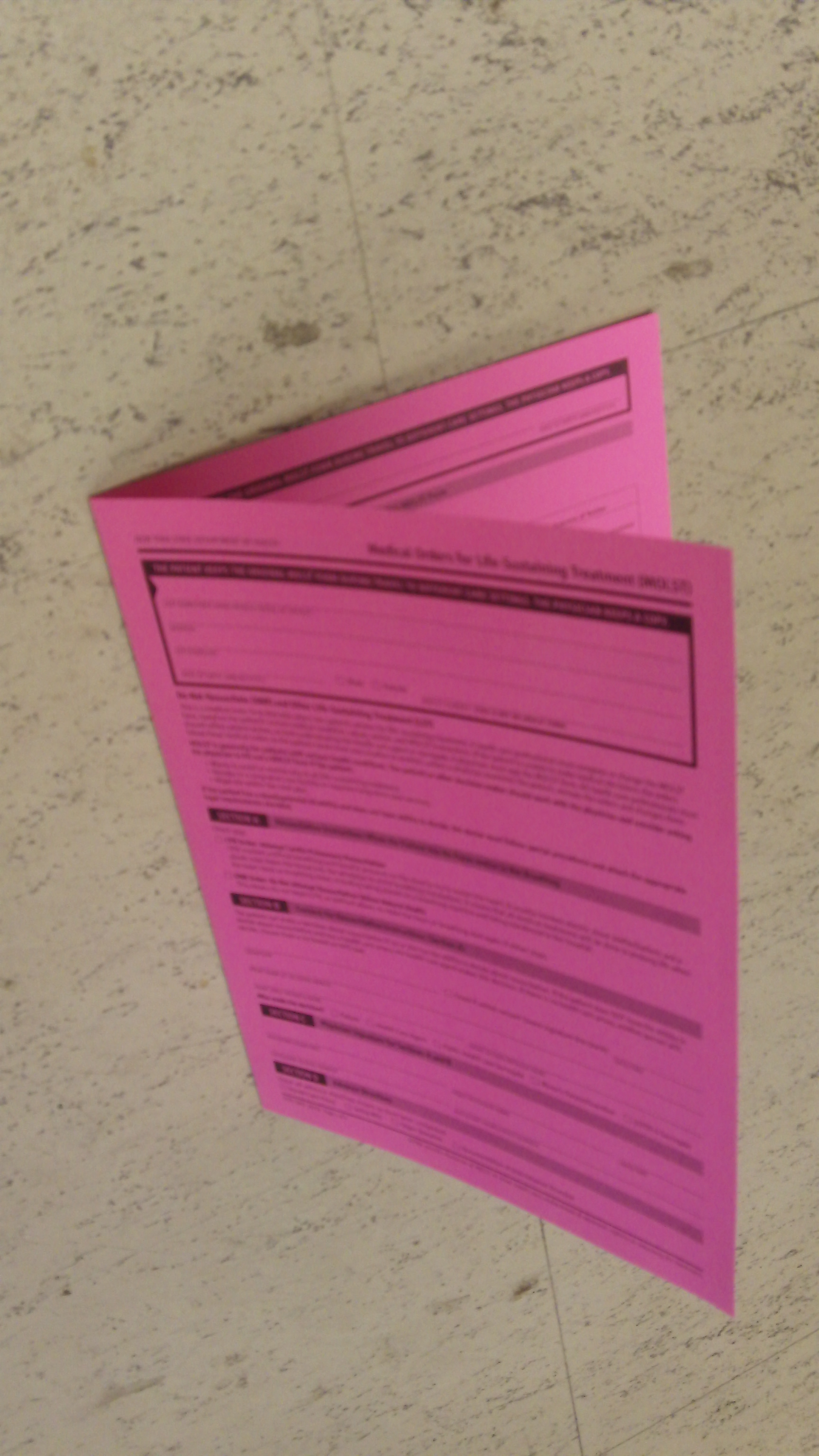
The MOLST Form

Under New York common law, health care providers may withhold or withdraw life-sustaining treatment from a patient who is dying and currently lacks the capacity to make his or her own medical decisions if doing so is based upon clear and convincing evidence of the patient's wishes.

Since 1987, New York has had a Do Not Resuscitate (DNR) law allowing surrogates to make decisions regarding cardiopulmonary resuscitation on behalf of an adult patient who lacks medical decision-making capacity. In 1991, the law was amended to authorize non-hospital orders not to resuscitate. Based upon this law, the New York State Department of Health created a "standard form" to issue a non-hospital order not to resuscitate (DOH-3474), which is still in use today.

In 2005, the law was amended to give the New York State Department of Health authority to issue "alternative forms" for issuing non-hospital orders not to resuscitate in Monroe and Onondaga Counties. This established MOLST as a pilot program. In 2006, the law was amended to allow such "alternative forms" to be used to issue non-hospital Do Not Intubate (DNI) orders. This was necessary because in New York State, emergency medical services personnel may only honor a DNR order in the event of a cardiac or respiratory arrest and would still intubate a patient with a DNR order unless the patient's heart or breathing has completely stopped.

In 2008, MOLST ceased to be a pilot program when the law was amended to authorize use of the MOLST form as a non-hospital DNR and DNI order statewide. In 2010, along with passage of the Family Health Care Decisions Act, the legal authority for MOLST was moved from N.Y. Public Health Law Article 29-B to a new N.Y. Public Health Law Article 29-CCC.

Under current law, the MOLST form can be used to issue a non-hospital DNR and DNI order in New York State, and those orders must be honored by emergency medical services personnel, home care services personnel, hospice personnel and hospital emergency services personnel. Physicians may also use the form for any patient in any setting to issue any orders for life-sustaining treatment.

Coverage for an initial preventive physical examination under Medicare Part B includes verbal or written information regarding a patient's ability to prepare a MOLST form and the physician's willingness to issue orders on a MOLST form.

New York Public Health Law section 2997-c requires the "attending health care practitioner" to offer to provide patients with a terminal illness with information and counseling regarding palliative care and end-of-life options appropriate to the patient.
