= Uniform Rights of the Terminally Ill Act =

The Uniform Rights of the Terminally Ill Act (1985, revised 1989), was recommended as a Uniform Act in the United States. The Uniform Rights of the Terminally Ill Act subsequently was passed by many states. The Uniform Rights of the Terminally Ill Act was replaced as a recommended Uniform act by the Uniform Health-Care Decision-making Act in 1993. The law allows a person to declare a living will specifying that, if the situation arises, he or she does not wish to be kept alive through life support if terminally ill or in a coma. The patient may also obtain a health care power of attorney. This power of attorney appoints an agent to make medical decision for the patient in case the patient becomes incompetent.

Many people make use of this act because they do not wish to endure any pain or suffering if weakened by a fatal disease. They want to "die with dignity," so that family members will not have to go through emotional pain of watching their loved one sleep through many years of life with no response to any stimuli.

This form of death is known as passive euthanasia, where death is not inflicted with drugs, but is allowed by cutting off life support.

== See also ==
- Family Health Care Decisions Act
