= Patient Self-Determination Act =

US law

The Patient Self-Determination Act (PSDA) was passed by the United States Congress in 1990 as an amendment to the Omnibus Budget Reconciliation Act of 1990. Effective on December 1, 1991, this legislation required many hospitals, nursing homes, home health agencies, hospice providers, health maintenance organizations (HMOs), and other health care institutions to provide information about advance health care directives to adult patients upon their admission to the healthcare facility. This law does not apply to individual physicians.

Section 1233 of the proposed America's Affordable Health Choices Act of 2009 (H.R. 3200) would have authorized reimbursements for physician counseling regarding advance directives (once every five years) but it was not included in the Patient Protection and Affordable Care Act of 2010 because of controversy over what were characterized as "death panels."

== Requirements ==
The requirements of the PSDA are as follows:

- Patients are given written notice upon admission to the health care facility of their decision-making rights, and policies regarding advance health care directives in their state and in the institution to which they have been admitted. Patient rights include:

1. The right to facilitate their own health care decisions
2. The right to accept or refuse medical treatment
3. The right to make an advance health care directive

- Facilities must inquire as to whether the patient already has an advance health care directive, and make note of this in their medical records.
- Facilities must provide education to their staff and affiliates about advance health care directives.
- Health care providers are not allowed to discriminately admit or treat patients based on whether or not they have an advance health care directive.
