= Do not resuscitate =

Legal order saying not to perform CPR if heart stops

Do-not-resuscitate order
- DNR form used in Virginia
- Other names: Do not attempt resuscitation, allow natural death, do not attempt cardiopulmonary resuscitation, do not attempt resuscitation, no CPR, not for resuscitation, not to be resuscitated no code

A do-not-resuscitate order (DNR), also known as Do Not Attempt Resuscitation (DNAR), Do Not Attempt Cardiopulmonary Resuscitation (DNACPR), no code or allow natural death, is a medical order, written or oral depending on the jurisdiction, indicating that a person should not receive cardiopulmonary resuscitation (CPR) if that person's heart stops beating. Sometimes these decisions and the relevant documents also encompass decisions around other critical or life-prolonging medical interventions. The legal status and processes surrounding DNR orders vary in different polities. Most commonly, the order is placed by a physician based on a combination of medical judgement and patient involvement.

== Basis for choice ==
Interviews with 26 DNR patients and 16 full code patients in Toronto, Canada in 2006–2009 suggest that the decision to choose do-not-resuscitate status was based on personal factors including health and lifestyle; relational factors (to family or to society as a whole); and philosophical factors. Audio recordings of 19 discussions about DNR status between doctors and patients in two US hospitals (San Francisco, California and Durham, North Carolina) in 2008–2009 found that patients "mentioned risks, benefits, and outcomes of CPR," and doctors "explored preferences for short- versus long-term use of life-sustaining therapy." A Canadian article suggests that it is inappropriate to offer CPR when the clinician knows the patient has a terminal illness and that CPR will be futile.

=== Outcomes of CPR ===
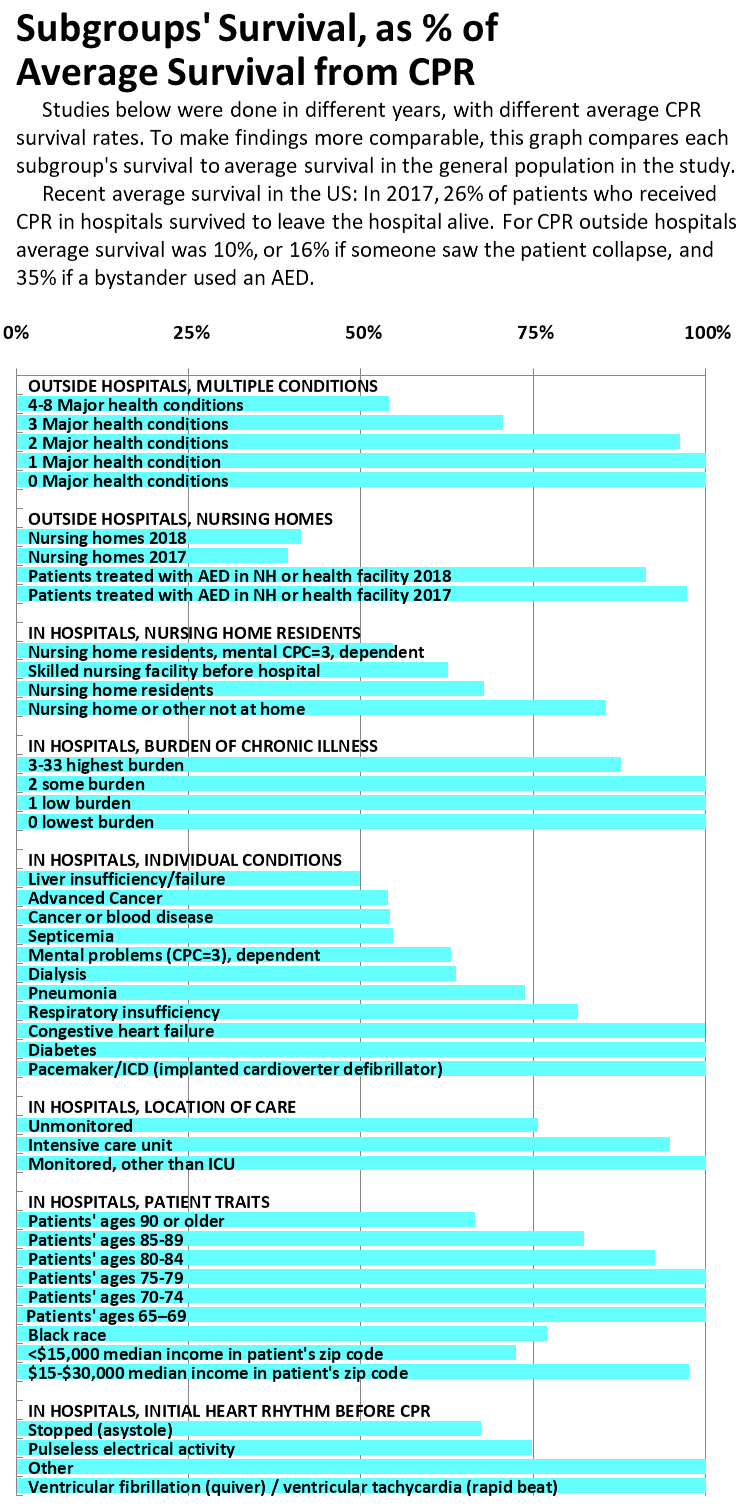
Survival from CPR among various groups

When medical institutions explain DNR, they describe survival from CPR, in order to address patients' concerns about outcomes. After CPR in hospitals in 2017, 7,000 patients survived to leave the hospital alive, out of 26,000 CPR attempts, or 26%. After CPR outside hospitals in 2018, 8,000 patients survived to leave the hospital alive, out of 80,000 CPR attempts, or 10%. Success was 21% in a public setting, where someone was more likely to see the person collapse and give help than in a home. Success was 35% when bystanders used an Automated external defibrillator (AED), outside health facilities and nursing homes.

In information on DNR, medical institutions compare survival for patients with multiple chronic illnesses; patients with heart, lung or kidney disease; liver disease; widespread cancer or infection; and residents of nursing homes. Research shows that CPR survival is the same as the average CPR survival rate, or nearly so, for patients with multiple chronic illnesses, or diabetes, heart or lung diseases. Survival is about half as good as the average rate, for patients with kidney or liver disease, or widespread cancer or infection.

For people who live in nursing homes, survival after CPR is about half to three quarters of the average rate. In health facilities and nursing homes where AEDs are available and used, survival rates are twice as high as the average survival found in nursing homes overall. Few nursing homes have AEDs.

Research on 26,000 patients found similarities in the health situations of patients with and without DNRs. For each of 10 levels of illness, from healthiest to sickest, 7% to 36% of patients had DNR orders; the rest had full code.

=== Risks ===
As noted above, patients considering DNR mention the risks of CPR. Physical injuries, such as broken bones, affect 13% of CPR patients, and an unknown additional number have broken cartilage which can sound like breaking bones.

Mental problems affect some patients, both before and after CPR. After CPR, up to 1 more person, among each 100 survivors, is in a coma than before CPR (though most people come out of comas). Five to 10 more people, of each 100 survivors, need more help with daily life than they did before CPR. Five to 21 more people, of each 100 survivors, decline mentally, but stay independent.

=== Organ donation ===
Organ donation is possible after CPR, but not usually after a death with a DNR. If CPR does not revive the patient, and continues until an operating room is available, then kidneys and liver can be considered for donation. US Guidelines endorse organ donation, "Patients who do not have ROSC (return of spontaneous circulation) after resuscitation efforts and who would otherwise have termination of efforts may be considered candidates for kidney or liver donation in settings where programs exist." European guidelines encourage donation, "After stopping CPR, the possibility of ongoing support of the circulation and transport to a dedicated centre in perspective of organ donation should be considered." CPR revives 64% of patients in hospitals and 43% outside (ROSC), which gives families a chance to say goodbye, and all organs can be considered for donation, "We recommend that all patients who are resuscitated from cardiac arrest but who subsequently progress to death or brain death be evaluated for organ donation."

1,000 organs per year in the US are transplanted from patients who had CPR. Donations can be taken from 40% of patients who have ROSC and later become brain dead, and an average of 3 organs are taken from each patient who donates organs. DNR does not usually allow organ donation.

=== Less care for DNR patients ===
Reductions in other care are not supposed to result from a DNAPR decision being in place. Some patients choose DNR because they prefer less care: Half of Oregon patients with DNR orders who filled out a POLST (Physician Orders for Life-Sustaining Treatment) (in Tennessee known as POST, Physician Orders and Scope of Treatment) wanted only comfort care, and 7% wanted full care. The rest wanted various limits on care, so blanket assumptions are not reliable. There are many doctors "misinterpreting DNR preferences and thus not providing other appropriate therapeutic interventions."

Patients with DNR are less likely to get medically appropriate care for a wide range of issues such as blood transfusions, cardiac catheterizations, cardiac bypass, operations for surgical complication, blood cultures, central line placement, antibiotics and diagnostic tests. "Providers intentionally apply DNR orders broadly because they either assume that patients with DNR orders would also prefer to abstain from other life-sustaining treatments or believe that other treatments would not be medically beneficial." 60% of surgeons do not offer operations with over 1% mortality to patients with DNRs. The failure to offer appropriate care to patients with DNR led to the development of emergency care and treatment plans (ECTPs), such as the Recommended Summary Plan for Emergency Care and Treatment (ReSPECT), which aim to record recommendations concerning DNR alongside recommendations for other treatments in an emergency situation. ECTPs have prompted doctors to contextualize CPR within a broader consideration of treatment options, however ECTPs are most frequently completed for patients at risk of sudden deterioration and the focus tends to be on DNR.

Patients with DNR therefore die sooner, even from causes unrelated to CPR. A study grouped 26,300 very sick hospital patients in 2006–2010 from the sickest to the healthiest, using a detailed scale from 0 to 44. They compared survival for patients at the same level, with and without DNR orders. In the healthiest group, 69% of those without DNR survived to leave the hospital, while only 7% of equally healthy patients with DNR survived. In the next-healthiest group, 53% of those without DNR survived, and 6% of those with DNR. Among the sickest patients, 6% of those without DNR survived, and none with DNR.

Two Dartmouth College doctors note that "In the 1990s ... 'resuscitation' increasingly began to appear in the medical literature to describe strategies to treat people with reversible conditions, such as IV fluids for shock from bleeding or infection... the meaning of DNR became ever more confusing to health-care providers." Other researchers confirm this pattern, using "resuscitative efforts" to cover a range of care, from treatment of allergic reaction to surgery for a broken hip. Hospital doctors do not agree which treatments to withhold from DNR patients, and document decisions in the chart only half the time. A survey with several scenarios found doctors "agreed or strongly agreed to initiate fewer interventions when a DNR order was present.

After successful CPR, hospitals often discuss putting the patient on DNR, to avoid another resuscitation. Guidelines generally call for a 72-hour wait to see what the prognosis is, but within 12 hours, US hospitals put up to 58% of survivors on DNR, and at the median hospital, 23% received DNR orders at this early stage, much earlier than the guideline. The hospitals putting fewest patients on DNR had more successful survival rates, which the researchers suggest shows their better care in general. When CPR happened outside the hospital, hospitals put up to 80% of survivors on DNR within 24 hours, with an average of 32.5%. The patients who received DNR orders had less treatment, and almost all died in the hospital. The researchers say families need to expect death if they agree to DNR in the hospital.

=== Controlled organ donation after circulatory death ===
In 2017, Critical Care Medicine (Ethics) and the American Society of Anesthesiologists (ASA) Committees on Transplant Anesthesia issued a statement regarding organ donation after circulatory death (DCD). The purpose of the statement is to provide an educational tool for institutions choosing to use DCD. In 2015, nearly 9% of organ transplantations in the United States resulted from DCD, indicating it is a widely-held practice. According to the President's Commission on Death Determination, there are two sets of criteria used to define circulatory death: irreversible absence of circulation and respiration, and irreversible absence of whole brain function. Only one criterion needs to be met for the determination of death before organ donation and both have legal standing, according to the 1980 Uniform Determination of Death Act (UDDA); a determination of death must be according to accepted medical standards. All states within the United States adhere to the original or modified UDDA. The dead donor role states that a patient should not be killed for or by the donation of their organs and that organs can only be procured from dead people (lungs, kidneys, and lobes of a liver may be donated by living donors in certain highly regulated situations).

The definition of irreversibility centers around an obligatory period of observation to determine that respiration and circulation have ceased and will not resume spontaneously. Clinical examination alone may be sufficient to determine irreversibility, but the urgent time constraints of CDC may require more definitive proof of cessation with confirmatory tests, such as intra-arterial monitoring or Doppler studies. In accordance with the Institute of Medicine, the obligatory period for DCD is longer than 2 minutes but no more than 5 minutes of absent circulatory function before pronouncing the patient dead, which is supported by a lack of literature indicating that spontaneous resuscitation occurs after two minutes of arrest and that ischemic damage to perfusable organs occurs within 5 minutes.

Most patients considered for DCD will have been in the intensive care unit (ICU) and are dependent on ventilatory and circulatory support. Potential DCD donors are still completing the dying process but have not yet been declared dead, so quality end-of-life care should remain the absolute top priority and must not be compromised by the DCD process. The decision to allow death to occur by withdrawing life-sustaining therapies needs to have been made in accordance to the wishes of the patient and/or their legal agent; this must happen prior to any discussions about DCD, which should ideally occur between the patient's primary care giver and the patient's agent after rapport has been established.

=== Patient values ===
The philosophical factors and preferences mentioned by patients and doctors are treated in the medical literature as strong guidelines for care, including DNR or CPR. "Complex medical aspects of a patient with a critical illness must be integrated with considerations of the patient's values and preferences" and "the preeminent place of patient values in determining the benefit or burden imposed by medical interventions." Patients' most common goals include talking, touch, prayer, helping others, addressing fears, and laughing. Being mentally aware was as important to patients as avoiding pain, and doctors underestimated its importance and overestimated the importance of pain. Dying at home was less important to most patients. Three quarters of patients prefer longer survival over better health.

== Advance directives, including living wills ==
Advance directives, including living wills, are documents written by individuals themselves, so as to state their wishes for care, if they are no longer able to speak for themselves.

In contrast, it is a physician or hospital staff member who writes a DNR "physician's order," based upon the wishes previously expressed by the individual in their advance directive or living will. Similarly, at a time when the individual is unable to express their wishes, but has previously used an advance directive to appoint an agent, then a physician can write such a DNR "physician's order" at the request of that individual's agent. These various situations are clearly enumerated in the "sample" DNR order presented on this page.

=== United States ===
In the United States, an advance directive or living will is not sufficient to ensure a patient is treated under the DNR protocol, even if it is their wish, as neither an advance directive nor a living will legally binds doctors. They can be legally binding in appointing a medical representative, but not in treatment decisions.

=== United Kingdom ===
In the United Kingdom, emergency care and treatment plans (e.g. ReSPECT) are clinical recommendations written by healthcare professionals after discussion with patients or their relatives about their priorities of care. Research has found that the involvement of patients or their family in forming ECTP recommendations is variable. In some situations (where there are limited treatment options available, or where the patient is likely to deteriorate quickly) healthcare professionals will not explore the patient's preferences, but will instead ensure that patients or their relatives understand what treatment will or will not be offered.

== Storage and communication ==
In the US, Physician Orders for Life-Sustaining Treatment (POLST) documents are the usual place where a DNR is recorded outside hospitals.

A disability rights group criticizes the process, saying doctors are trained to offer very limited scenarios with no alternative treatments, and steer patients toward DNR. They also criticize that DNR orders are absolute, without variations for context. The Mayo Clinic found in 2013 that "Most patients with DNR/DNI (do not intubate) orders want CPR and/or intubation in hypothetical clinical scenarios," so the patients had not had enough explanation of the DNR/DNI or did not understand the explanation.

=== Medical jewellery ===
Medical bracelets, medallions, and wallet cards from approved providers allow for identification of DNR patients in home or non-hospital settings. In the US each state has its own DNR policies, procedures, and accompanying paperwork for emergency medical service personnel to comply with such forms of DNR.

=== DNR tattoos ===
There is a growing trend of using DNR tattoos, commonly placed on the chest, to replace other forms of DNR, but these often cause confusion and ethical dilemmas among healthcare providers. Laws vary from place to place regarding what constitutes a valid DNR and currently do not include tattoos. End of life (EOL) care preferences are dynamic and depend on factors such as health status, age, prognosis, healthcare access, and medical advancements. DNR orders can be rescinded while tattoos are far more difficult to remove. At least one person decided to get a DNR tattoo based on a dare while under the influence of alcohol.

== Ethics and violations ==
DNR orders in certain situations have been subject to ethical debate. In many institutions it is customary for a patient going to surgery to have their DNR automatically rescinded. Though the rationale for this may be valid, as outcomes from CPR in the operating room are substantially better than general survival outcomes after CPR, the impact on patient autonomy has been debated. It is suggested that facilities engage patients or their decision makers in a 'reconsideration of DNR orders' instead of automatically making a forced decision.

When a patient or family and doctors do not agree on a DNR status, it is common to ask the hospital ethics committee for help, but authors have pointed out that many members have little or no ethics training, some have little medical training, and they do have conflicts of interest by having the same employer and budget as the doctors.

In the United States there is accumulating evidence of racial differences in rates of DNR adoption. A 2014 study of end stage cancer patients found that non-Latino white patients were significantly more likely to have a DNR order (45%) than black (25%) and Latino (20%) patients. The correlation between preferences against life-prolonging care and the increased likelihood of advance care planning is consistent across ethnic groups.

There are also ethical concerns around how patients reach the decision to agree to a DNR order. One study found that patients wanted intubation in several scenarios, even when they had a Do Not Intubate (DNI) order, which raises a question whether patients with DNR orders may want CPR in some scenarios too. It is possible that providers are having a "leading conversation" with patients or mistakenly leaving crucial information out when discussing DNR.

One study reported that while 88% of young doctor trainees at two hospitals in California in 2013 believed they themselves would ask for a DNR order if they were terminally ill, they are flexible enough to give high intensity care to patients who have not chosen DNR.

There is also the ethical issue of discontinuation of an implantable cardioverter defibrillator (ICD) in DNR patients in cases of medical futility. A large survey of Electrophysiology practitioners, the heart specialists who implant pacemakers and ICDs, noted that the practitioners felt that deactivating an ICD was not ethically distinct from withholding CPR thus consistent with DNR. Most felt that deactivating a pacemaker was a separate issue and could not be broadly ethically endorsed. Pacemakers were felt to be unique devices, or ethically taking a role of "keeping a patient alive" like dialysis.

A self-report study from 1999 conducted in Germany and Sweden found that the frequency of resuscitations performed against patients' wishes (per DNR status) was as high as 32.5% among German doctors polled.

=== Violations and suspensions ===
Medical professionals can be subjected to ramifications if they knowingly violate a DNR. Each state has established laws and rules that medical providers must follow. For example, in some states within the US, DNRs only apply within a hospital, and can be disregarded in other settings. In these states, EMTs (emergency medical technicians) can therefore administer CPR until reaching the hospital where such laws exist.

If a medical professional knows of a DNR and continues with resuscitation efforts, then they can be sued by the family of the patient. This happens often, with a jury awarding $400,000 to the family of a patient for "Wrongful Prolongation of Life" in June 2021. Physicians and their attorneys have argued in some cases that when in doubt, they often err on the side of life-saving measures because they can be potentially reversed later by disconnecting the ventilator. This was the case in 2013 when Beatrice Weisman was wrongfully resuscitated, leading to the family filing a lawsuit.

In the US, bystanders who are not healthcare professionals working in a professional setting are protected under the Good Samaritan Law in most cases. Bystanders are also protected if they begin CPR and use a AED even if there is a DNR tattoo or other evident indicator.

Instead of violating a DNR, anesthesiologists often require suspension of a DNR during palliative care surgeries, such as when a large tumor needs to be removed or a chronic pain issue is being solved. Anesthesiologists argue that the patient is in an unnatural state during surgery with medications, and anesthesiologists should be allowed to reverse this state. This suspension can occur during the pre-op, peri-op, and post-operative period. These suspensions used to be automatic and routine, but this is now viewed as unethical. The Patient Self-Determination Act also prohibits this, as automatic suspension would be a violation of this federal order. However, it is still a common practice for patients to opt for a suspension of their DNR depending on the circumstances of the surgery.

Ethical dilemmas on suspending a DNR occur when a patient with a DNR attempts suicide and the necessary treatment involves ventilation or CPR. In these cases, it has been argued that the principle of beneficence takes precedence over patient autonomy and the DNR can be revoked by the physician. Another dilemma occurs when a medical error happens to a patient with a DNR. If the error is reversible only with CPR or ventilation, there is no consensus if resuscitation should take place or not.

== Terminology ==
DNR and Do Not Resuscitate are common terms in the United States, Canada, and New Zealand. This may be expanded in some regions with the addition of DNI (Do Not Intubate). DNI is specific for not allowing the placement of breathing tubes. In some hospitals DNR alone will imply no intubation, though 98% of intubations are unrelated to cardiac arrest; most intubations are for pneumonia or surgery. Clinically, the vast majority of people requiring resuscitation will require intubation, making a DNI alone problematic. Hospitals sometimes use the expression no code, which refers to the jargon term code, short for Code Blue, an alert to a hospital's resuscitation team. If a patient does want to be resuscitated, their code status may be listed as full code (the opposite of DNR). If the patient only wants to be resuscitated under certain conditions, this is termed partial code.

Some areas of the United States and the United Kingdom include the letter A, as in DNAR, to clarify "Do Not Attempt Resuscitation". This alteration is so that it is not presumed by the patient or family that an attempt at resuscitation will be successful.

As noted above in Less care for DNR patients, the word "resuscitation" has grown to include many treatments other than CPR, so DNR has become ambiguous, and authors recommend "No CPR" instead. In the United Kingdom the preferred term is now DNACPR, reflecting that resuscitation is a general term which includes cardiopulmonary resuscitation as well as, for example, the administration of intravenous fluid.

Since the term DNR implies the omission of action, and therefore "giving up", a few authors have advocated for these orders to be retermed Allow Natural Death. Others say AND is ambiguous whether it would allow morphine, antibiotics, hydration or other treatments as part of a natural death. New Zealand and Australia, and some hospitals in the UK, use the term NFR or Not For Resuscitation. Typically these abbreviations are not punctuated, e.g., DNR rather than D.N.R.

Resuscitation orders, or lack thereof, can also be referred to in the United States as a part of Physician Orders for Life-Sustaining Treatment (POLST), Medical Orders for Life-Sustaining Treatment (MOLST), Physician's Orders on Scope of Treatment (POST) or Transportable Physician Orders for Patient Preferences (TPOPP) orders, typically created with input from next of kin when the patient or client is not able to communicate their wishes.

Another synonymous term is "not to be resuscitated" (NTBR).

In 2004 the internal telephone number for cardiac arrests in all UK hospitals was standardised to 2222; in 2017 the European Board of Anaesthesiology (EBA, European Resuscitation Council (ERC), and the European Society of Anaesthesiology (ESAIC) issued a joint statement recommending this practice across all European hospitals. Current UK practice is for resuscitation recommendations to be standalone orders (such as DNACPR) or embedded within broader emergency care and treatment plans (ECTPs), such as the Recommended Summary Plan for Emergency Care and Treatment (ReSPECT).

== Usage by country ==
DNR documents are widespread in some countries and unavailable in others. In countries where a DNR is unavailable, the decision to end resuscitation is made solely by physicians.

A 2016 paper reports a survey of small numbers of doctors in numerous countries, asking "how often do you discuss decisions about resuscitation with patients and/or their family?" and "How do you communicate these decisions to other doctors in your institution?" Some countries had multiple respondents, who did not always act the same, as shown below. There was also a question "Does national guidance exist for making resuscitation decisions in your country?" but the concept of "guidance" had no consistent definition. For example, in the US, four respondents said yes, and two said no.

Doctors' approaches to communication about resuscitation
Country/Location	Discuss with patient or family	Tell other doctors the decision
Argentina	Most	Written
Australia	Most, half	Oral+notes+pre-printed,(2) notes
Austria	Half	Notes
Barbados	Half	Oral+notes
Belgium	Half, rarely	Notes+electronic
Brazil	Most	Oral+notes
Brunei	Rarely	Oral+notes
Canada	Always, most	Oral+notes, oral+notes+electronic, notes+pre-printed
Colombia	Half	Oral
Cuba	Always	Oral
Denmark	Most	Electronic
France	Most	Pre-printed
Germany	Always	Oral+notes+electronic
Hong Kong	Always, half	Notes+pre-printed, oral+notes+pre-printed
Hungary	Rarely	Oral
Iceland	Rarely	Notes+electronic
India	Always	Notes, oral, oral+notes
Ireland	Most, rarely	Notes (2)
Israel	Most, half	Oral+notes,(2) notes
Japan	Most, half	Oral, notes
Lebanon	Most	Oral+notes+electronic
Malaysia	Rarely	Notes
Malta	Most	Notes
New Zealand	Always	Pre-printed
Netherlands	Half	Electronic (3)
Norway	Always, rarely	Oral, notes+electronic
Pakistan	Always	Notes+electronic
Poland	Always, most	Oral+notes, notes+pre-printed
Puerto Rico	Always	Pre-printed
Saudi Arabia	Always, most	Pre-printed, notes+electronic, oral
Singapore	Always, most, half	Pre-printed (2), oral+notes+pre-printed, oral+notes+electronic, oral+pre-printed
South Africa	Rarely	Oral+notes
South Korea	Always	Pre-printed
Spain	Always, most	Pre-printed, oral+notes+electronic, oral+notes+pre-printed
Sri Lanka	Most	Notes
Sweden	Most	Oral+notes+pre-printed+electronic
Switzerland	Most, half	Oral+notes+pre-printed, oral+notes+other
Taiwan	Half, rarely	Notes+pre-printed+other, oral
UAE	Half	Oral+notes
Uganda	Always	Notes
USA	Always, most	Notes, electronic, oral+electronic, oral+notes+electronic, oral+notes+pre-printed+electronic

=== Australia ===
In Australia, Do Not Resuscitate orders are covered by legislation on a state-by-state basis.

In Victoria, a Refusal of Medical Treatment certificate is a legal means to refuse medical treatments of current medical conditions. It does not apply to palliative care (reasonable pain relief; food and drink). An Advanced Care Directive legally defines the medical treatments that a person may choose to receive (or not to receive) in various defined circumstances. It can be used to refuse resuscitation, so as to avoid needless suffering.

In NSW, a Resuscitation Plan is a medically authorised order to use or withhold resuscitation measures, and which documents other aspects of treatment relevant at end of life. Such plans are only valid for patients of a doctor who is a NSW Health staff member. The plan allows for the refusal of any and all life-sustaining treatments, the advance refusal for a time of future incapacity, and the decision to move to purely palliative care.

=== Brazil ===
There is no formally recognized protocol for creating and respecting DNR orders in Brazil's healthcare delivery system. The legality of not administering resuscitation procedures for terminally ill patients has not been clearly defined, leading many providers to practice caution around withholding CPR.

Although DNR orders have not been institutionalized in Brazil there has been a significant amount of dialogue around the ethical question of whether or not to withhold resuscitation interventions. In the past two decades the Federal Medical Board of Brazil published two resolutions, CFM 1.805/2006 and CFM 1.995/2012, which address therapeutic limitations in terminally ill patients as well as advanced directives. A recent study also showed that in Brazil's healthcare system CPR is being withheld in scenarios of terminal illness or multiple comorbidities at rates similar to those in North America.

=== Canada ===
Do not resuscitate orders are similar to those used in the United States. In 1995, the Canadian Medical Association, Canadian Hospital Association, Canadian Nursing Association, and Catholic Health Association of Canada worked with the Canadian Bar Association to clarify and create a Joint Statement on Resuscitative Interventions guideline for use to determine when and how DNR orders are assigned. DNR orders must be discussed by doctors with the patient or patient agents or patient's significant others. Unilateral DNR by medical professionals can only be used if the patient is in a vegetative state.

=== France ===
In 2005, France implemented its "Patients' Rights and End of Life Care" act. This act allows the withholding/withdrawal of life support treatment and as well as the intensified usage of certain medications that can quicken the action of death. This act also specifies the requirements of the act.

The "Patients' Rights and End of Life Care" Act includes three main measures. First, it prohibits the continuation of futile medical treatments. Secondly, it empowers the right to palliative care that may also include the intensification of the doses of certain medications that can result in the shortening the patient's life span. Lastly, it strengthens the principle of patient autonomy. If the patient is unable to make a decision, the discussion, thus, goes to a trusted third party.

=== Hong Kong ===
A Law Reform Commission consultation from 2004 to 2006 resulted in a recommendation that legislation be passed in support of advance directives. In November of 2024, the Legislative Council of Hong Kong passed “The Advance Decision on Life-sustaining Treatment Ordinance” to take effect after 18 months. This law establishes a legal framework for competent patients over 18 to refuse life-sustaining treatment.

Since 2010, The Hong Kong Hospital Authority has adopted a set of forms which its doctors will recognize if properly completed. However, their recognition at private hospitals is less clear.

=== India ===
In India, a DNR order is a medical directive indicating no cardiopulmonary resuscitation (CPR) should be performed if the patient's heart or breathing stops, and does not imply withdrawal of all care. Even though DNR policies are not uniformly codified under the national law, they are guided by ethical frameworks from the Indian Council of Medical Research (ICMR) and legal precedents such as the Supreme Court's judgement (2018), in Common Cause vs. Union of India, which recognised the right to die with dignity under Article 21, legalising passive euthanasia and advance medical directives by 'competent' adults.

In case of pediatric and minors patients, the guidelines are outlined by the ICMR, the Indian Academy of Pediatrics, and the Ministry of Health and Family Welfare. Minors, lacking legal capacity to consent, require resuscitation decisions to be made by parents or legal guardians and physicians. Such decisions are legally permissible only if resuscitation is medically futile, unlikely to improve survival or quality of life, or would prolong suffering in terminal or irreversible conditions. Physicians are legally required to thoroughly discuss prognosis, outcomes, and implications with parents or guardians, securing their informed, signed consent and documenting the medical rationale. The decision is reviewed periodically and is reversible if the patient's condition improves or if new information emerges.

=== Israel ===
In Israel, it is possible to sign a DNR form as long as the patient is at least 17 years of age, dying, and aware of their actions.

=== Italy ===
In Italy DNR is included in the Italian law no. 219 of December 22, 2017, "Disposizioni Anticipate di Trattamento" or DAT, also called "biotestamento". The law no.219 "Rules on informed consent and advance treatment provisions", reaffirm the freedom of choice of the individual and make concrete the right to health protection, respecting the dignity of the person and the quality of life. The DAT are the provisions that every person of age and capable of understanding and wanting can express regarding the acceptance or rejection of certain diagnostic tests or therapeutic choices and individual health treatments, in anticipation of a possible future inability to self-determine. To be valid, the DATs must have been drawn up only after the person has acquired adequate medical information on the consequences of the choices he intends to make through the DAT. With the entry into force of law 219/2017, every person of age and capable of understanding and willing can draw up his DAT. Furthermore, the DATs must be drawn up with: public act authenticated private writing simple private deed delivered personally to the registry office of the municipality of residence or to the health structures of the regions that have regulated the DAT Due to particular physical conditions of disability, the DAT can be expressed through video recording or with devices that allow the person with disabilities to communicate. The DATs do not expire. They can be renewed, modified or revoked at any time, with the same forms in which they can be drawn up. With the DAT it is also possible to appoint a trustee, as long as he is of age and capable of understanding and willing, who is called to represent the signatory of the DAT who has become incapable in relations with the doctor and health facilities. With the Decree of 22 March 2018, the Ministry of Health established a national database for the registration of advance treatment provisions. Without the expression of any preference by the patient, Physicians must attempt to resuscitate all patients regardless of familial wishes.

=== Japan ===
In Japan, DNR orders are known as Do Not Attempt Resuscitation (DNAR). Currently, there are no laws or guidelines in place regarding DNAR orders but they are still routinely used. A request to withdraw from life support can be completed by the patient or a surrogate. In addition, it is common for Japanese doctors and nurses to be involved in the decision-making process for the DNAR form.

=== Jordan ===
DNRs are not recognized by Jordan. Physicians attempt to resuscitate all patients regardless of individual or familial wishes.

=== Nigeria ===
There is no formally accepted protocol for DNRs in Nigeria's healthcare delivery system. Written wills may act as a good guide in many end of life scenarios, but often physicians and/or patients' families will act as the decision makers. As quoted in a 2016 article on Advanced Directives in Nigeria, "everything derives from communal values, the common good, the social goals, traditional practices, cooperative virtues and social relationship. Individuals do not exist in a vacuum but within a web of social and cultural relationships." There are vast cultural differences and perspectives on end of life within Nigeria itself between regions and communities of different ancestry.

=== Saudi Arabia ===
In Saudi Arabia patients cannot legally sign a DNR, but a DNR can be accepted by order of the primary physician in case of terminally ill patients.

=== Taiwan ===
In Taiwan, patients sign their own DNR orders, and are required to do so to receive hospice care. However, one study looking at insights into Chinese perspectives on DNR showed that the majority of DNR orders in Taiwan were signed by surrogates. Typically doctors discuss the issue of DNR with the patients family rather than the patient themselves. In Taiwan, there are two separate types of DNR forms: DNR-P which the patient themselves sign and DNR-S in which a designated surrogate can sign. Typically, the time period between signing the DNR and death is very short, showing that signing a DNR in Taiwan is typically delayed. Two witnesses must also be present in order for a DNR to be signed.

DNR orders have been legal in Taiwan since June 2000 and were enacted by the Hospice and Palliative Regulation. Also included in the Hospice and Palliative Regulation is the requirement to inform a patient of their terminal condition, however, the requirement is not explicitly defined leading to interpretation of exact truth telling.

=== United Arab Emirates ===
The UAE have laws forcing healthcare staff to resuscitate a patient even if the patient has a DNR or does not wish to live. There are penalties for breaching the laws.

=== United Kingdom ===
==== England ====
In England, CPR is presumed in the event of a cardiac arrest unless a do not resuscitate order is in place. If they have capacity as defined under the Mental Capacity Act 2005 the patient may decline resuscitation. Patients may also specify their wishes and/or devolve their decision-making to a proxy using an advance directive, which are commonly referred to as 'Living Wills', or an emergency care and treatment plan (ECTP), such as ReSPECT. Discussion between patient and doctor is integral to decisions made in advance directives and ECTPs, where resuscitation recommendations should be made within a more holistic consideration of all treatment options. Patients and relatives cannot demand treatment (including CPR) which the doctor believes is futile and in this situation, it is their doctor's duty to act in their 'best interest', whether that means continuing or discontinuing treatment, using their clinical judgment. If the patient lacks capacity, relatives will often be asked for their opinion in order to form a 'best interest' view of what the individual's views would have been (prior to losing capacity). Evaluation of ReSPECT (an ECTP) found that resuscitation status remained a central component of conversations, and that there was variability in the discussion of other emergency treatments.

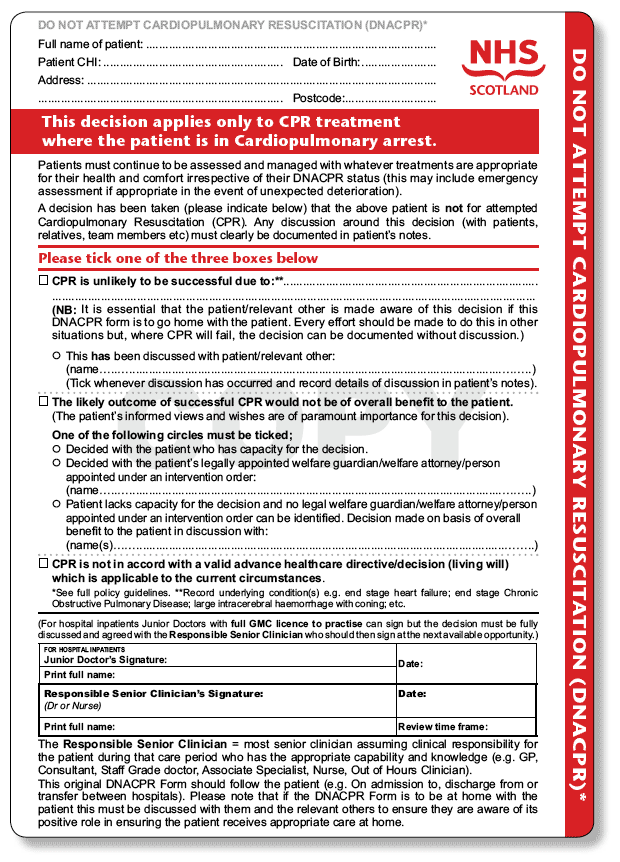
DNACPR form as used in Scotland

In 2020 the Care Quality Commission found that residents of care homes had been given inappropriate orders of Do not attempt cardiopulmonary resuscitation (DNACPR) without notice to residents or their families, causing avoidable deaths. In 2021, the Mencap charity found that people with learning disabilities also had inappropriate DNACPR orders. Medical providers have said that any discussion with patients and families is not in reference to consent to resuscitation and instead should be an explanation. The UK's regulatory body for doctors, the General Medical Council, provides clear guidance on the implementation and discussion of DNACPR decisions, and the obligation to communicate these decisions effectively was established by legal precedent in 2015.

==== Scotland ====
In Scotland, the terminology used is "Do Not Attempt Cardiopulmonary Resuscitation" or "DNACPR". There is a single policy used across all of NHS Scotland. The legal standing is similar to that in England and Wales, in that CPR is viewed as a treatment and, although there is a general presumption that CPR will be performed in the case of cardiac arrest, this is not the case if it is viewed by the treating clinician to be futile. Patients and families cannot demand CPR to be performed if it is felt to be futile (as with any medical treatment) and a DNACPR can be issued despite disagreement, although it is good practice to involve all parties in the discussion.

As in England and Wales, inappropriate orders have been given to individuals who had no medical reason for them, such as a deaf man who received a DNACPR order in 2021 due to "communication difficulties."

==== Wales ====
Wales has its own national DNACPR policy, 'Sharing and Involving'. They use the term 'Do Not Attempt Cardiopulmonary Resuscitation' or 'DNACPR'. They also have an active public information campaigns, which includes the website 'TalkCPR'

=== United States ===
In the United States the documentation is especially complicated in that each state accepts different forms, and advance directives also known as living wills may not be accepted by EMS as legally valid forms. If a patient has a living will that specifies the patient requests DNR but does not have a properly filled out state-sponsored form that is co-signed by a physician, EMS may attempt resuscitation.

The DNR decision by patients was first litigated in 1976 in In re Quinlan. The New Jersey Supreme Court upheld the right of Karen Ann Quinlan's parents to order her removal from artificial ventilation. In 1991 Congress passed into law the Patient Self-Determination Act that mandated hospitals honor an person's decision in their healthcare. Forty-nine states currently permit the next of kin to make medical decisions of incapacitated relatives, the exception being Missouri. Missouri has a Living Will Statute that requires two witnesses to any signed advance directive that results in a DNR/DNI code status in the hospital.

In the United States, cardiopulmonary resuscitation (CPR) and advanced cardiac life support (ACLS) will not be performed if a valid written DNR order is present. Many states do not recognize living wills or health care proxies in the prehospital setting and prehospital personnel in those areas may be required to initiate resuscitation measures unless a specific state-sponsored form is properly filled out and cosigned by a physician.

==== Legal precedent for the right to refuse medical interventions ====
There are three notable cases which set the baseline for patient's rights to refuse medical intervention:

1. Karen Quinlan, a 21-year-old woman, was in a persistent vegetative state after experiencing two 15-minute apneic periods secondary to drug use. After a year without improvement her father requested that life support be withdrawn. The hospital refused and this culminated in a court case. The trial court sided with the hospital, however the New Jersey Supreme Court reversed the decision. This was the first of multiple state level decisions pre-empting the Cruzan case which established the non-religious (there were other prior rulings regarding Jehovah's Witnesses) right to refuse care and extended that right to incapacitated patients via their guardians. It also established that court cases are not needed to terminate care when there is concordance between the stakeholders in the decision (Guardian, Clinician, Ethics Committees). It also shifted the focus from the right to seek care to the right to die. Mrs. Quinlan survived for 9 years after mechanical ventilation was discontinued.
2. Nancy Cruzan was a 31-year-old woman who was in a persistent vegetative state after a motor vehicle accident that caused brain damage. Her family asked that life support be stopped after 4 years without any improvement. The hospital refused without a court order, and the family sued to obtain one. The trial court sided with the family concluding that the state could not override her wishes. This ruling was appealed to and reversed by the Missouri Supreme Court. This case was ultimately heard by the United States Supreme Court, which affirmed the right of competent individuals to refuse medical treatment and established standards for refusal of treatment for an incompetent person.
3. Theresa "Terri" Schiavo was a 27-year-old woman who experienced cardiac arrest and was resuscitated successfully. She was in a persistent vegetative state thereafter. After 8 years in this state without recovery, her husband decided to have her feeding tube removed. Schiavo's parents disagreed and the case that ensued ultimately was heard by the Florida Supreme Court which ruled that remaining alive would not respect her wishes. The United States Supreme Court affirmed that decision and refused to hear the case. This case affirmed the right of a patient to refuse care that is not in their best interests even when incapacitated.

== See also ==
- Futile medical care
- End-of-life ethics
