= Wrongful birth =

Legal cause of action

Wrongful birth is a legal cause of action in some common law countries in which the parents of a congenitally diseased child claim that their doctor failed to properly warn of their risk of conceiving or giving birth to a child with serious genetic or congenital abnormalities. Thus, the plaintiffs claim, the defendant prevented them from making a truly informed decision as to whether or not to have the child. Wrongful birth is a type of medical malpractice tort. It is distinguished from wrongful life, in which the child sues the doctor.

== Elements ==
An example of the general elements of a wrongful birth claim, as established by the California Supreme Court, are:

- the existence of a patient–doctor relationship between the defendant and the plaintiff;
- the doctor negligently failed to disclose to the prospective parents the risk of having a child with a genetic or congenital disease;
- the plaintiff suffered harm; and
- the doctor's negligence caused that harm.

=== Patient–doctor relationship ===
The plaintiff must establish the existence of a patient–doctor relationship by showing that the doctor gave the plaintiff a medical diagnosis or medical advice.

=== Negligence ===
In a wrongful birth case, the plaintiff must show that the doctor failed to follow the standard of care with respect the diagnosis or disclosure of the plaintiffs' risk of transmitting genetic or congenital abnormalities to their children.

If the plaintiffs allege that the defendant failed to properly diagnose the plaintiffs' risk of passing on a genetic disorder or other abnormality, then the plaintiffs must put forth expert testimony as to the standard of care for the diagnosis at issue. Lay juries do not have the necessary knowledge of medical practice to evaluate the conduct of doctors without the assistance of an expert witness.

If the plaintiffs allege that the defendant failed to disclose the risk of conceiving a child with an abnormality, then the plaintiffs must show that the doctor had the duty to make the disclosure at issue. Doctors are under an obligation to disclose to their patients the risks of passing on a genetic condition to their prospective children. However, the doctor need not disclose all risks or recommend all available testing procedures. For example, in the case of Munro v. Regents of the University of California, the court held that the doctor was not under an obligation to recommend a Tay–Sachs test when the doctor had no reason to suspect his patients were at any more at risk for Tay–Sachs disease than the general population, when the risk of Tay–Sachs among the general population was between 1 in 200 and 1 in 300, and when the Tay–Sachs test was "generally useless" for the vast majority of patients. The plaintiffs may also prove the negligence element by showing that the doctor failed to properly disclose the availability of genetic or prenatal screening procedures. As in other failure to disclose cases, the plaintiff will need to show that doctor owed a duty to make the disclosures at issue.

=== Harm ===
The plaintiffs in a wrongful birth case may claim that their harms consist in having a child with an undesired abnormality, or in having been denied the opportunity to make a fully informed choice as to whether to conceive or to abort the fetus.

=== Cause ===
In the past, plaintiffs have had to prove cause by showing that if the defendant had not been negligent, the child would have been normal. Under this standard, the defendant may argue that even if she or he failed to diagnose an existing fetus with a genetic or developmental abnormality, she or he did not cause the parents or fetus to have mutated genes or the fetus to develop the abnormality. Once the fetus is determined to have an abnormality, the doctor may not be able to treat the fetus, making the abnormality inevitable. If the doctor fails to diagnose the plaintiff's risk of transmitting a genetic disease, or fails to inform the plaintiff of that risk, then it is the combination of the parents' genetic mutations and choice to have a child that most directly results in the conception of an abnormal child. Because of difficulties in proving cause under this standard some courts disallowed wrongful birth suits.

More recently, plaintiffs have been able to prove the causation element by showing that the defendant's negligence deprived them of the opportunity to fully consider the choice whether or not to conceive or abort their fetus. However, the plaintiffs must still prove that had the doctor acted properly they would have declined to conceive or would have aborted their abnormal fetus. This standard for causation has allowed plaintiffs to more easily prove the causation element. Still, the plaintiffs' claim that they would not have had an abnormal child is in some ways speculative. The decision whether or not to conceive given the risk of bearing an abnormal child would likely to be difficult and emotional, with an unpredictable outcome, as would the decision to abort an abnormal fetus. Additionally, some defendants have argued that the tort is subject to fraudulent claims, as proof of the claim that the plaintiffs would have aborted an abnormal fetus would often come in the form of the plaintiff's retrospective and subjective testimony.

== Damages ==
Most courts now only allow only the costs associated with raising an abnormal child, such as medical care that would not be needed for a healthy child. Thus, most courts do not allow the recovery of all costs associated with raising the plaintiffs' child. Some courts have ruled that plaintiffs may recover additional damages, such as those for emotional distress, loss of consortium, and physical pain suffered by the wife during delivery of an unhealthy child. See the example of the Keel case below.

== Prevalence of wrongful birth laws ==
On February 19, 1975, the Texas Supreme Court's ruling in the case Jacobs v. Theimer made Texas the first state in America to declare a woman could sue her doctor for a wrongful birth. That case involved Dortha Jean Jacobs (later Dortha Biggs), who caught rubella while pregnant and gave birth to Lesli, who was severely disabled. Dortha and her husband sued her doctor, saying he did not diagnose the rubella or warn them how it would affect the pregnancy.

Twenty-five U.S. states now recognize the wrongful birth cause of action.

However, some states have statutorily banned wrongful birth actions. See for example Idaho Code §5-334(1): "A cause of action shall not arise, and damages shall not be awarded, on behalf of any person, based on the claim that but for the act or omission of another, a person would not have been permitted to have been born alive but would have been aborted."

== Controversy ==
There is some controversy as to whether or not the wrongful birth cause of action should be recognized.

=== Arguments against ===
Allowing the wrongful birth cause of action may increase the rate of abortion, a practice some consider unethical. Doctors under threat of being sued for wrongful birth have an incentive to be vigilant in detecting the risk that prospective parents will have a congenitally diseased child, in disclosing any risks to the prospective parents, and in recommending various tests to determine the risk or existence a congenital abnormality. Thus, more prospective parents will become aware of that their fetuses have congenital abnormalities, giving them reason to abort. Academics concerns have also been raised that wrongful birth suits restrict rather than advance the freedom of choice by parents and doctors.

Most disability activists consider these actions to be unethical and indicative of social intolerance toward disabled individuals. For instance, in 2012, several disability rights organizations wrote a letter to the ACLU protesting its language in support of wrongful birth lawsuits. It is generally felt that allowing wrongful birth lawsuits for things like Down Syndrome and Spina Bifida sends a clear message that such individuals should not be born.

=== Arguments for ===
The prospective parents of any child have an autonomy interest in making informed decisions about whether or not to procreate. Many prospective parents might want to know if they are at high risk for passing a genetic disease to their offspring. They also might want to know whether their fetus has some kind of congenital abnormality. A doctor who fails to adequately disclose the risk that his patients might have an abnormal child, or who fails to properly diagnose an abnormal fetus, is depriving the prospective parents of the chance to make a fully informed procreative decision. In light of the great importance many people place on their procreative decisions and the care with which they make them, a doctor whose negligence interferes with those decisions should be held responsible for the consequences of that negligence.

== Example ==
In the Alabama case of Keel v. Banach the plaintiffs were a man and his pregnant wife, who both sought to avoid having a child with genetic or developmental abnormalities. The man's previous stillborn child had a spinal cord defect and other abnormalities known to have a hereditary basis, placing the man at increased risk of fathering a second child with such abnormalities. The defendant was an obstetrician who performed several sonograms on the woman and her developing fetus. The defendant did not detect any abnormalities and assured the parents that their child was developing normally. However, the child was born with a variety of severe congenital abnormalities, requiring multiple surgeries. The child died at the age of six.

The parents sued on a theory of wrongful birth. The court ruled "the parents of a congenitally defective child may maintain an action for its wrongful birth if the birth was the result of the negligent failure of the attending physician to discover and inform them of the existence of fetal defects." The plaintiffs could recover for any medical expenses caused by the defendant's negligence as well as for the physical pain of the wife, loss of consortium and mental and emotional suffering.

== Similar causes of action ==
=== Wrongful life ===
Wrongful life is a legal cause of action in which a congenitally-diseased child sues the doctor, claiming that but for the negligence of the doctor, the child would not have been born into a life of pain and suffering. The child claims he or she would have been better off never having been born than having been born with a congenital disease. Unlike wrongful birth causes of action, most states do not recognize the wrongful life cause of action. Some courts have reasoned that wrongful life claims call for the court to answer a metaphysical question better left to philosophers: whether it is better never to be born than to be born with a congenital disease. However, some courts, starting with California, have recognized the wrongful life claim. The California Court of Appeal held in 1980 that "a reverent appreciation of life compels recognition that [a wrongful life] plaintiff, however impaired she may be, has come into existence as a living person with certain rights" – i.e. the right to recover against a doctor whose negligence resulted in her disease. In 1982, the Supreme Court of California largely endorsed and adopted the Court of Appeal's holding in a different case but limited the child's recovery to special damages.

=== Wrongful conception ===
In a wrongful conception case, the plaintiffs claim that their doctor negligently performed a vasectomy, tubal ligation, or other sterilization procedure, resulting in an unwanted pregnancy or birth. The resulting child is usually healthy, though unwanted.

In 2003, the Indiana Supreme Court recognized the medical malpractice tort of "wrongful pregnancy" when a woman became pregnant after a failed sterilization procedure. The court decided that the damages may include the cost of the pregnancy but may not include the ordinary cost of raising the child, as the benefits of rearing the child could not be calculated.

=== Wrongful adoption ===
In a wrongful adoption case, the plaintiffs are adoptive parents of an unhealthy child, who claims that the adoption agency failed to disclose facts necessary for the plaintiffs to make an informed decision about what child to adopt, such as the background, health or genetic status of potential adoptees.

== See also ==
- Cattanach v Melchior
