= Physician Orders for Life-Sustaining Treatment =

Medical order regarding decisions for end-of-life care

POLST (Physician Orders for Life-Sustaining Treatment) is an approach to improving end-of-life care in the United States, encouraging providers to speak with the severely ill and create specific medical orders to be honored by health care workers during a medical crisis. POLST began in Oregon in 1991 and currently exists in 46 states, British Columbia, and South Korea. The POLST document is a standardized, portable, brightly colored single page medical order that documents a conversation between a provider and an individual with a serious illness or frailty towards the end of life. A POLST form allows emergency medical services to provide treatment that the individual prefers before possibly transporting to an emergency facility.

The POLST form is a medical order which means that the POLST form is always signed by a medical professional and, depending upon the state, the person stated on the form can sign as well. A pragmatic rule for initiating a POLST can be if the clinician would not be surprised if the individual were to die within one year. One difference between a POLST form and an advance directive is that the POLST form is designed to be actionable throughout an entire community. It is immediately recognizable and can be used by doctors and first responders (including paramedics, fire departments, police, emergency rooms, hospitals and nursing homes). Compared to documents like DNI (Do Not Intubate), DNR (Do Not Resuscitate) and advance directive, the POLST form provides more information on the types of end-of-life treatment or intervention that the severely ill person wishes to receive.

Organizations that have passed formal resolutions in support of POLST include the American Bar Association and the Society for Post-Acute and Long-Term Care Medicine (AMDA). Other organizations that support POLST include the American Nurses Association (ANA); the National Academy of Medicine; National Association of Social Workers (NASW); AARP; the American Academy of Hospice and Palliative Medicine (AAHPM); The Pew Charitable Trusts; and the Catholic Health Association of the United States(CHA).

POLST orders are also known by other names in some states:

- Medical Orders for Life-Sustaining Treatment (MOLST),
- Medical Orders on Scope of Treatment (MOST),
- Physician's Orders on Scope of Treatment (POST) or
- Transportable Physician Orders for Patient Preferences (TPOPP).

== What is POLST? ==
POLST represents a significant paradigm change in advance care policy by standardizing provider communications through a plan of care in a portable way, rather than focusing solely on standardizing individuals' communications via advance directives.

The POLST paradigm requires people, their surrogates, and their providers to accomplish three core tasks:

- First, POLST begins with a conversation between a health care professional and the individual (or the individual's authorized surrogate) about treatment options in light of the individual's current condition.
- Second, the individual's preferences for treatments are incorporated into medical orders, which are recorded on a highly visible, standardized form that is kept at the front of the medical record or with the individual if they lives in the community.

POLST forms record several treatment decisions common to seriously ill individuals, for example: cardiopulmonary resuscitation; the level of medical intervention desired in the event of an emergency (comfort only, limited treatment, or full treatment); and the use of artificial nutrition and hydration. As technology and treatment options change, POLST forms will also continue to evolve.

- Third, providers encourage that the POLST form travels with the individual whenever he or she moves from one setting to another, thereby promoting the continuity of care throughout a community.

The POLST form is designed to transfer across treatment settings, so it is readily available to medical personal, including EMTs, emergency physicians and nursing staff. The POLST program relies upon teamwork and coordinated systems to ensure preferences are honored throughout the health care system. Research suggests the POLST form accurately represents individual's treatment preferences the majority of the time and that the treatments provided at the end of life match the orders on the form. An established POLST program can help reduce unwanted hospitalizations and honor the person's end-of-life wishes.

To determine whether a POLST form should be completed, clinicians should ask themselves, "Would I be surprised if this person died in the next year?" If the answer is that the patient's prognosis is one year or less, then a POLST form is appropriate.

In a 2006 consensus report, the National Quality Form observed that "compared with other advance directive programs, POLST more accurately conveys end-of-life preferences and yields higher adherence by medical professionals." The National Quality Forum and other experts have recommended nationwide implementation of the POLST paradigm Implementation of POLST was also recently recommended by the National Academy of Sciences Institute of Medicine in its report, "Dying in America: Improving Quality and Honoring Individual Preferences Near the End of Life." The report was released September 17, 2014.

== What is on the POLST Form? ==
The POLST form is usually on brightly colored paper that contains options for the individual depending on their health status. The POLST form generally has sections for the individual to decide whether or not they would want cardiopulmonary resuscitation (CPR), the preferred level of medical interventions, or whether they would want artificially administered nutrition. Depending on the state, there could be another section on whether to provide antibiotics or not to the individual being treated.

=== Cardiopulmonary Resuscitation (CPR) ===
The first section in most forms across the country is Section A indicating the option between performing cardiopulmonary resuscitation (CPR) or no CPR or do not attempt to resuscitate. The national form indicates mechanical ventilators, defibrillation and cardioversion under the CPR specifications. A study showed that there was a high rate of providers respecting the individual's decisions regarding CPR, which means that the providers respected their wishes according to the POLST forms.

=== Preferred Medical Interventions ===
The level of medical intervention is on section B on the POLST form with options of "comfort measures", "limited additional treatment", or "full treatment". This section only comes into play if the individual still has a pulse and/or if they are still breathing. The "comfort measures" allow for natural death and only helps the individual relieve any pain. By checking this box, the individual also prefers to not be transferred within the hospital. The "limited additional treatment" includes the comfort measures in addition to basic medical treatment. “Full treatment” authorizes the medical team to try their best to save the individual and increases their life expectancy with all methods. This option also allows people to choose whether they would like a trial period. A study on nursing home residents has shown the high rate that the medical teams respected peoples’ wishes and gave the treatments according to the orders on section B.

=== Artificially Administered Nutrition ===
This section comes with options of “no artificial nutrition by tube”, “defined trial period of artificial nutrition by tube” and “long-term artificial nutrition by tube”. If the person is able to chew and swallow, the food will be taken by mouth. Studies have found that orders to withhold artificial nutrition such as feeding tubes are usually executed by the providers.

=== Antibiotics ===
For most versions of POLST, orders on antibiotics have three aspects: antibiotic use to enhance comfort, the use of intravenous/intramuscular (IV/IM) antibiotics, and the use of antibiotics at time of disease or infection. Studies have found orders on the use of antibiotics for comfort measures tend to have high rates of execution. However, one study has shown that providers do not always obey the individual's wish to not use antibiotics. Because certain types of infection have other means to alleviate symptoms of infections, so physicians' use of antibiotics seem to be generally unaffected by POLST.

== How is the form used? ==
Before executing the orders on the POLST form, the provider should talk with individuals with decision-making capacity to obtain the most updated wishes. This process or conversation could involve families and relevant care providers as well to ensure people are well-informed while making the decisions. If the individual has made changes to the POLST form, the provider is responsible for explaining how the updates will likely impact future treatment plans. However, if the individual is not able to make decisions because of his or her disease state, the clinicians have to follow orders on preexisting POLST forms.

== Differences between an advance directive and a POLST Form ==
=== Advance Directive ===
An advance directive is a legal document that allows individuals to share their wishes with their health care team during a future medical emergency. The document does so by designating a guardian that the user wants their medical team to work with (also known as a “surrogate”). Competent individuals above 18 years of age can fill out an advance directive. An advance directive allows an individual to state what treatments he or she would want in a medical crisis, but it is not a medical order. Advance directives are not portable in a sense that it is not accessible across medical systems, so it is the individual's responsibility to have the form on them at all times. This can bring up challenges as it can be difficult to locate and may need to be interpreted when it is needed. Because advanced directives are filled out by healthy individuals, the form is considered to be a "living will".

=== POLST Form ===
Unlike advance directives, a POLST should only be used when the individual is at the end of life. Typically, if a provider believes that a person's condition will increasingly worsen and make it hard for the individual to survive another year, then a POLST Form is used. A POLST form turns a person's treatment wishes outlined in an advance directive into medical orders. The POLST Form provides explicit guidance to healthcare professionals under predictable future circumstances based on the individual's current medical condition. The POLST form is reviewed more frequently compared to an advance directive to make sure that the form complies with the individual's wishes in treatments as the disease progresses.

Compared to the advanced directive, there is no designated surrogate when using a POLST Form. To designate a health care surrogate, people must use an advance directive. Once a surrogate is established and if the individual does not have the mental capacity to make decisions, the surrogate has the authority to make decisions on the POLST Form; the amount of authority for the surrogate, however, varies per state. An individual does not need to have an advance directive to have a POLST form although health care professionals recommend that all competent adults have advance directives in place; this will help healthcare providers shape a more concise medical decision that better reflects the individual's wishes.

Lastly, the POLST form is very portable unlike the advance directive. It is the physicians' responsibility to make it accessible across different medical facilities.

== POLST History ==
- 1991: Oregon POLST task force was created. The first prototype was known as the Medical Treatment Cover Sheet (MTC). This was created to have a standard to regulate medical orders for people with chronic illnesses. The list of treatments that were included on this form would include resuscitation, nutrition, intubation, antibiotics, and other preferred medical interventions. Focus groups and studies were executed to evaluate the use of this form and significant modifications were made. This later resulted in the renaming of the form.
- 1993: The name "Physician Orders for Life-Sustaining Treatment or POLST was adopted.
- 1995: First POLST form was used in Oregon. Many other states wanted to implement this in their own settings so there was a need for execution at a national level.
- 2004:
  - National POLST Paradigm Task Forced was developed. The task force included Oregon, New York, Pennsylvania, Washington, West Virginia, and Wisconsin. The focus of the task force was to create an organized standard and help other states who wanted to develop a POLST program.
  - Georgia, Idaho, Maryland, Nevada, Utah, and Vermont were all under development for POLST by this time.
- 2005: The National Task Force created a more clear description and outline of the program including the contents of the form and developments of endorsement for the program. This was established as the National POLST Paradigm.
- 2006: West Virginia and Wisconsin adopt POLST. Iowa forms a focus group of health care providers to address the current fragmentation of end-of-life communication.
- 2007: A formal in-person meeting was held for education on the POLST paradigm at the National Hospice and Palliative Care Organization conference in New Orleans.
- 2008: POLST becomes law in California and MOLST becomes law in New York. Iowa pilot project conducted (continues until 2011).
- 2009:
  - A second in-person formal meeting was held with the American Academy of Hospice and Palliative Medicine national conference in Austin, Texas. A major goal at this point was to have a structure similar in all states so it can be used and honored in all states and provide education about the program for efficient care. The program gives people the power to make the decision about their care and provides a guidance for decision-making about life-sustaining treatments.
  - Massachusetts MOLST Demonstration Project was implemented in Massachusetts pursuant to a mandate in the Commonwealth Acts of 2008. MA MOLST form http://molst-ma.org/sites/molst-ma.org/files/MOLST%20Form%20and%20Instructions%208.10.13%20FINAL.pdf
  - Oregon developed a was to allow electronic access of POLST statewide to steer away from paper forms and accessing medical records.
- 2010: Illinois forms the POLST Taskforce with support from more than 60 health care organizations; the Catholic Health Association formally supports POLST.
- 2011: POLST is signed into law in New Jersey after Governor Chris Christie conditionally vetoes S-2197 for provisions allowing doctors to override people's wishes. Vermont requires all out-of-hospital DNR/COLST orders to be documented on the Vermont DNR/COLST form.
- 2012:
  - First National POLST Conference held in San Diego, California. Iowa passes legislation to implement the current IPOST form; Illinois passes POLST legislation (Illinois introduces a POLST form in March 2013).
  - Wisconsin Catholic bishops warn against POLST.
  - Anti-abortion groups react to Wisconsin bishops' statement.
  - Anti-abortion leaders find parallels between POLST ramifications and similar political expedients in history.
  - The Catholic Health Association specifies how the POLST form is consistent with the Catholic Directives.
- 2013: POLST becomes law in Indiana and Nevada; 20 states have POLST statutes. 27 states was under development for this program. Only 7 states at this point did not have POLST in some form of development.
- 2015:
  - California allows a nurse practitioner or physician assistant under a supervision of a physician to sign a POLST form.
  - 46 out of 50 states have the program established or under development.

== Public Opinions ==
=== Support ===
Supporters suggests that POLST protects individuals’ right to make their own medical decisions and prevents the miscommunications among individuals, their family members and healthcare providers. Most healthcare providers have a positive attitude towards POLST, saying that the form presents peoples’ wishes and they can provide better care at individual's end of life with the form as guidance. This also prevents undesirable interventions as well as unnecessary expense on hospice care in healthcare facilities. For example, the medical teams would not give resuscitation or other medical interventions unless individuals indicate on the form. According to Gundersen lutheran Health System, after they have adopted POLST, about $3000 to $6000 is reduced at the cost for each person because the hospital does not need to use medical devices or interventions to support their lives after they select “comfort measures” on the form. In addition, the formal document is a standard medical order signed by physicians and it is legal and effective in various healthcare settings and states. In other words, if individuals travel to another state with POLST, hospitals in that state may accept the form as a plan of care and fulfill their wishes at the end of life. POLST can be also an implement to examine any discrepancies between the actual treatments and individuals’ preferences, and to make sure that healthcare providers would respect and obey their preferences, which avoids the situations that may go against their wills.

POLST covers the limitations that advance directives and Do Not Resuscitate or Do Not Intubate orders (DNR/DNI) have. For example, illnesses are unsteady as the conditions may change in severity every day. Individuals that are 18 years old and above can fill out the form when they are healthy and competent, but they are not able to foresee what may happen and they may change their mind in treatments; however, advance directives does not take the changes into consideration. The form can be filled out by surrogates who may express individual’s preferences differently or mistakenly. Also, DNR/DNI only considers the situations that are related to CPR or intubation instead of recording individuals’ preferences in various situations at the end of their lives. Some studies have shown that the providers were less likely to give aggressive treatments to individuals with DNR/DNI even if they are not critically ill. A study on nursing home residents has found that most residents with DNR order marked on POLST forms that they would like to have treatments, which indicates that DNR orders do not convey individual’s ideas and POLST is a better tool in communication. Therefore, advance directives and DNR/DNI may not be truly proposed to improve individuals care at the end of life.

=== Opposition ===
Conservative groups like the Media Research Center and the Catholic Medical Association argue that there will be unintended consequences or potential abuses fostered by POLST adoption. In some cases, this results from the way the enabling laws are written. Any document determining an individual's quality of care or life-ending choices carries moral and ethical dilemmas, and POLST instruments (or the protocols and circumstances through which they are explained to people) have been criticized for this by the Catholic Medical Association. The Catholic Health Association answered criticisms in a white paper entitled “The POLST Paradigm and Form: Facts and Analysis.” POLST is viewed to be conflicted with Catholic ideas on “rightful and wrongful refusal decisions” especially on the last section about nutrition and antibiotics, and the Catholic providers feel being forced to follow the order since it seems to violate their beliefs.

Healthcare providers also mention some challenges that have met when introducing POLST to individual's and their families. They may not feel comfortable discussing the content of the form or they have trouble understanding it. People and their family members may also have different opinions when completing the form. In addition, the physicians may not support POLST and refuse to sign because they are worried that they may need to take the blame or have some responsibilities by signing it even if using the form is a part of standard care.

Some people suggested that some of the questions on POLST forms do not apply to actual situations. For example, in the first section on the form is asking if individuals would like to have resuscitation when they do not have pulses. But some individuals may not be hospitalized or they may be living at home and cannot get access to the interventions mentioned on the form; and thus, the question is not suitable for their situations. Some people also doubt whether POLST truly delivers individuals’ wills as they may change their minds in different contexts. Studies have shown that up to 45% of individuals were unsure of their choices when they first filled out the form and up to 70% of individuals had inconsistent answers when the questions were phrased differently.

== POLST research ==
Several studies have supported the use of POLST as a tool to ensure people's wishes are complied with:

- In a 1998 study, charts of 180 residents at eight Oregon nursing facilities were evaluated over a one-year period. Where the POLST forms of residents included "do not resuscitate" and "comfort measures only" orders, none of the residents received unwanted cardiopulmonary resuscitation (CPR), intensive care, or ventilator support.
- In 2000, a study was done in the community setting showed that CPR use was 91% consistent with the use of POLST forms and about 45% of medical interventions were consistent with section B of the form.
- In 2004, a survey of selected sites revealed that the POLST program was widely used in Oregon nursing facilities. Care matched POLST instructions to a high degree regarding CPR (91%), antibiotics (86%), intravenous fluids (84%), and feeding tubes (94%). Level-of-care instructions (from comfort care to full medical intervention) were followed less often (46%).
- A 2004 survey of 572 EMTs in Oregon found that a large majority of EMTs felt that the POLST form provides clear instructions about people's preferences and is useful when deciding which treatments to provide.
- In 2009, researchers assessed the penetration of POLST in hospice programs in Oregon, Wisconsin, and West Virginia. A pilot study indicated that POLST was used widely in hospices in Oregon (100%) and West Virginia (85%) but only regionally in Wisconsin (6%). A majority of hospice staff believed POLST was useful in preventing unwanted resuscitation and initiating conversations about treatment preferences.
- In 2010, an observational retrospective cohort study compared the use of the POLST forms with the use of "traditional" orders in 1711 residents of nursing facility. The results of the study showed that individuals are much more likely to include end-of-life treatment preferences "beyond CPR status" when using the POLST form (98%) than "traditional practices or orders" (16%).
- In 2011, a survey with a sample size of 169 was done in the state of New York found that the about half of the providers and healthcare workers including physicians, nurses, social workers and nurse practitioners felt the need to have a conversation about the POLST form with the individual they are providing service to. The major reason for this preference is these healthcare workers believe the use of the POLST form can lead to better management of disease symptoms such as pain.
- In 2014, state death records containing cause and location of death were matched with POLST orders for people (sample size N = 58,000) with a POLST form in the state registry. Conclusion: The association with numbers of deaths in the hospital suggests that end-of-life preferences of people who wish to avoid hospitalization as documented in POLST orders are honored.
- In 2014, a chart review study with a sample size of 31,294 studied POLST forms in an electronic registry in the state of Oregon. The study found that POLST forms came in six different combinations: "DNR/Comfort Measures Only, DNR/Limited Interventions, DNR/Full Treatment, Attempt CPR/Comfort Measures Only, Attempt CPR/Limited Interventions, and Attempt CPR/Full Treatment." The data showed that about 10% of the order combinations appeared confusing and did not make sense to providers because they seemed contradicting. The most popular combinations were "DNR/Comfort Measures and DNR/Limited Interventions."
- In 2016, the study included comparison of two different state POLST programs having distinct demographics and different approaches to electronic registries. A key metric evaluated was the relationship of POLST medical intervention orders to in-hospital death, which was evaluated using POLST data linked with state death records. Conclusion: the study indicated similar patterns between the two states in which Comfort Only orders less often resulted in in-hospital deaths, compared to Full Treatment orders.

=== Limitations of POLST Research ===
Most of the studies done on the POLST research were done in Oregon where there is a less diverse demographic. The studies done on POLST were mainly done in nursing facilities. Therefore, there is limited data about POLST in other parts of the community. In addition, the training for the physicians for implementing POLST program may not be consistent throughout different healthcare facilities.
