= List of medical ethics cases =

Some cases have been remarkable for starting broad discussion and for setting precedent in medical ethics.

== Research ==
Research
case	country	location	year	summary
Psychosurgery			1880s	Psychosurgery (also called neurosurgery for mental disorder) has a long history. During the 1960s and 1970s, it became the subject of increasing public concern and debate, culminating in the US with congressional hearings. Particularly controversial was the work of Harvard neurosurgeon Vernon Mark and psychiatrist Frank Ervin, who wrote a book, Violence and the Brain, in 1970. The National Commission for the Protection of Human Subjects of Biomedical and Behavioral Research in 1977 endorsed the continued limited use of psychosurgical procedures. Since then, a few facilities in some countries have continued to use psychosurgery on small numbers of patients. In the US and other Western countries, the number of operations has further declined over the past 30 years, a period during which there have been no major advances in ablative psychosurgery.
Surgical removal of body parts to try to improve mental health	United States	New Jersey	1920s	Controversial psychiatrist Henry Cotton at Trenton State Hospital in New Jersey became convinced that insanity was fundamentally a toxic disorder and he surgically removed body parts to try to improve mental health.
The Monster Study	United States	Iowa	1939	The Monster Study is the name given to a stuttering experiment performed on orphan children in Davenport, Iowa in 1939. It was conducted by Wendell Johnson at the University of Iowa. The research began with the selection of 22 subjects from a veterans' orphanage in Iowa. None were told the intent of the research, and they believed that they were to receive speech therapy. The study was trying to induce stuttering in healthy children. The experiment became national news in the San Jose Mercury News in 2001, and a book was written. On 17 August 2007, six of the orphan children were awarded $925,000 by the State of Iowa for lifelong psychological and emotional scars caused by six months of torment during the Iowa University experiment. Although none of the children became stutterers, some became self-conscious and reluctant to speak. A spokesman for the University of Iowa called the experiment "regrettable".
Medical Experimentation on Black Americans	United States	Various	Occurred over many decades	There has been a long history of medical experimentation on African Americans. From the era of slavery, when atrocities were committed on black women by J. Marion Sims, to the present day, Black Americans have been unwitting subjects of medical experimentation. Author Harriet Washington argues that "diverse forms of racial discrimination have shaped both the relationship between white physicians and black patients and the attitude of the latter towards modern medicine in general." In the 1960s, Ionia State Hospital, located in Ionia, Michigan, was one of America's largest and most notorious state psychiatric hospitals in the era before deinstitutionalization. Doctors at this hospital diagnosed African Americans with schizophrenia because of their civil rights ideas. See The Protest Psychosis.
Plutonium injections	United States		1945–1947	Eighteen people were injected with plutonium by Manhattan Project doctors; the most notorious of them, Albert Stevens, received more radiation than any other living person. None of the patients were told about the experiment, nor did the doctors ask for their consent. See Eileen Welsome's book The Plutonium Files.
Doctors' Trial	United States		1946	German medical doctors went on criminal trial for Nazi human experimentation. See The Years of Extermination.
Guatemala syphilis experiments	U.S./ Guatemala		1946–48	The syphilis experiments in Guatemala were United States human experiments conducted in Guatemala from 1946 to 1948. The experiments were led by physician John Charles Cutler. They were done during the administration of American President Harry S. Truman and Guatemalan President Juan José Arévalo. Doctors infected soldiers, prostitutes, prisoners, and mental patients with syphilis and other sexually transmitted diseases without the informed consent of the subjects, and treated most subjects with antibiotics. This resulted in at least 83 deaths. In October 2010, the US formally apologized to Guatemala for conducting these experiments.
Skid Row Cancer Study	United States	New York State	1950s	More than 1200 homeless men from Lower Manhattan were convinced with promises of food and shelter to have their prostates biopsied by a Dr. Perry Hudson. They were not informed of possible side effects, i.e., rectal tearing and impotence. The homeless were targeted for these biopsies because the biopsies were painful and untested, and less vulnerable populations would not volunteer.
Radioactive iodine experiments	United States		1950s	The U.S. Atomic Energy Commission has a history of involvement in experiments involving radioactive iodine. In a 1949 operation called the "Green Run", the AEC released iodine-131 and xenon-133 to the atmosphere, which contaminated a 500,000-acre (2,000 km^{2}) area containing three small towns near the Hanford site in Washington. In 1953, the AEC ran several studies on the health effects of radioactive iodine in newborns and pregnant women at the University of Iowa. Also in 1953, the AEC sponsored a study to discover if radioactive iodine affected premature babies differently from full-term babies. In another AEC study, researchers at the University of Nebraska College of Medicine fed iodine-131 to 28 healthy infants through a gastric tube to test the concentration of iodine in the infants' thyroid glands.
Henrietta Lacks	United States	Baltimore	1951	A product derived from a cancer patient's specimen, HeLa is the cornerstone of an industry. Cancerous tissue was taken from her without her consent.
Albert Kligman's dermatology experiments	United States	Philadelphia	1951–1974	Clinical non-therapeutic medical experiments on prison inmates was conducted at Holmesburg Prison in Philadelphia from 1951 to 1974 under the direction of dermatologist Albert Kligman.
Allan Memorial Institute	Canada	Montreal, Quebec	1957–1964	The Allan Memorial Institute is known for its role in the Project MKULTRA run by the CIA. The Agency's initiative to develop drug-induced "mind control" techniques was implemented in the institute by its then-Director Donald Ewen Cameron.
UK mental institutions	UK		1960s	In the 1960s, there was abuse and inhumane treatment of psychiatric patients who were hidden away in institutions in the UK. Barbara Robb documented her difficult personal experience of being treated at Ely Hospital. She wrote the book Sans Everything and she used this to launch a campaign to improve or close long stay facilities. Shortly after, a long stay hospital for mentally disabled people in Cardiff was exposed by a nurse writing to the News of the World. This exposure prompted an official inquiry, which was highly critical of conditions, staff morale, and management. At the same time Michael Ignatieff and Peter Townsend both published books which exposed the poor quality of institutional care.
Thalidomide scandal	International: Mostly US and Europe		1950s-60s	Thalidomide was given to people, including pregnant women, resulting in severe birth deformities and miscarriages. Despite not receiving FDA approval in the US, thalidomide was given to many women as part of clinical trials without their consent or awareness. This led to substantive changes to clinical trial regulations in US and Europe.
Milgram experiment	United States		1961	The Milgram experiment on obedience to authority figures was a series of notable social psychology experiments conducted by Yale University psychologist Stanley Milgram, which measured the willingness of study participants to obey an authority figure who instructed them to perform acts that conflicted with their personal conscience. The detailed findings are discussed in his 1974 book, Obedience to Authority: An Experimental View. The experiments were controversial, and considered by some scientists to be unethical and physically or psychologically abusive. Psychologist Diana Baumrind considered the experiment "harmful because it may cause permanent psychological damage and cause people to be less trusting in the future."
Harry Bailey's deep sleep therapy	Australia	Sydney	1962-1979	Controversial Australian psychiatrist Harry Bailey treated mental patients via deep sleep therapy and other methods at a Sydney mental hospital. He has been linked with the deaths of 85 patients. He died by suicide before he could be punished.
Political abuse of psychiatry	Soviet Union, Romania, Hungary, Czechoslovakia, Yugoslavia and China		1960s to 1980s	Psychiatrists have been involved in human rights abuses in states across the world when the definitions of mental disease were expanded to include political disobedience. In the period from the 1960s to 1986, abuse of psychiatry for political purposes was reported to be systematic in the Soviet Union and other Eastern European countries. Political abuse of psychiatry also takes place in the People's Republic of China. Psychiatric diagnoses such as the diagnosis of "sluggish schizophrenia" in political dissidents in the USSR were used for political purposes.
Stanford prison experiment	United States		1971	The Stanford prison experiment was a study of the psychological effects of becoming a prisoner or prison guard. The experiment was conducted in August 1971 by a team of researchers led by psychology professor Philip Zimbardo. Participants took on the roles of prisoners and guards in a mock prison situated in the basement of the Stanford psychology building. Some of the prisoners were subjected to psychological torture. Many of the prisoners passively accepted psychological abuse, and Zimbardo himself permitted the abuse to continue. Two of the prisoners quit the experiment early and the entire experiment was abruptly stopped after only six days. Certain portions of the experiment were filmed and excerpts of footage are publicly available.
Human radiation experiments	United States		1970s	Human radiation experiments were directed by the United States Atomic Energy Commission and the Manhattan Project. In Nashville, pregnant women were given radioactive mixtures. In Cincinnati, some 200 patients were irradiated over a period of 15 years. In Chicago, 102 people received injections of strontium and cesium solutions. In Massachusetts, 74 schoolboys were fed oatmeal that contained radioactive substances. In all of these cases, the subjects did not know what was going on and did not give informed consent. The government covered up most of these radiation mishaps until 1993, when President Bill Clinton ordered a change of policy. The resulting investigation was undertaken by the Advisory Committee on Human Radiation Experiments. See The Plutonium Files.
Tuskegee syphilis experiment	United States	Tuskegee, Alabama	1972	A 40-year experiment conducted by the U.S. Public Health Service withheld standard medical advice and treatment from a poor minority population with an easily treatable disease. The experiment targeted black male farmers who were told they needed to be treated for 'bad blood', but who were, in fact, syphilitic. In addition to many fatalities, some children were born with congenital syphilis due to the study.
Moore v. Regents of the University of California	United States	California	1976	Researchers commercialized a patient's discarded body parts. The man did not authorize the use of his bodily tissues or fluids, and researchers did not obtain informed consent. He did not want his donation to generate commercial profit for private entities.
Eugene Landy	United States	California	1980s	Eugene Ellsworth Landy was an American psychologist and psychotherapist best known for his unconventional 24-hour therapy as well as ethical violations concerning his treatment of Beach Boys co-founder Brian Wilson in the 1980s. In 2015, Landy's relationship with Wilson was dramatized in the biographical film Love & Mercy.
Willowbrook State School	United States	Staten Island	1987	A school had been infecting disabled children in experiments for years.
Study 329	Canada, United States	12 psychiatric centers	1994–2001	SmithKlineBeecham, known since 2000 as GlaxoSmithKline, conducted a clinical trial from 1994 to 1997 in 12 psychiatric centers in North America to study the efficacy of paroxetine (Paxil, Seroxat), an anti-depressant, on teenagers. The trial data suggested that the drug was not efficacious and that the paroxetine group were more likely to think about suicide. The paper that wrote up the study was published in 2001, ostensibly authored by a group of academics, but actually ghostwritten by the drug company. The article downplayed the negative findings and concluded that paroxetine helped with teenage depression. The company used this paper to promote paroxetine for teenagers. The ensuing controversy led to several lawsuits, including from the parents of teenagers who killed themselves while taking the drug, and intensified the debate about medical ghostwriting and conflict of interest in clinical trials. In 2012 the US Justice Department fined GlaxoSmithKline $3 billion for several violations, including withholding data on paroxetine, unlawfully promoting it for adolescents, and preparing a misleading article about study 329. New Scientist wrote in 2015: "You may never have heard of it, but Study 329 changed medicine."
Death associated with psychotropic drugs	United States	Cheyenne, Wyoming	1998	In 1998, 60-year-old Donald Schell went to see his doctor, complaining of difficulty sleeping. He was diagnosed with an anxiety state and placed on Paxil (paroxetine - see "Study 329" above), an SSRI anti-depressant. Within 48 hours of being put on Paxil Schell killed his wife, daughter, infant granddaughter, and himself. Tim Tobin, Schell's son-in-law, took legal action against SmithKline (now GlaxoSmithKline). The Tobin case was heard in Wyoming from May 21 to June 6, 2001. The jury returned a guilty verdict against SmithKline and awarded Tobin $6.4 million. This was the first guilty verdict returned against a pharmaceutical company regarding adverse behavioral effects of a psychotropic drug.
Robert Courtney	United States	Kansas City, Missouri	2002	Courtney is a former pharmacist who owned and operated Research Medical Tower Pharmacy in Missouri. In 2002, he was convicted of pharmaceutical fraud and sentenced to federal prison.
Greenberg v. Miami Children's Hospital Research Institute	United States	Florida	2003	Patients donated tissue samples, which researchers subsequently used in a plan to generate profit.
GlaxoSmithKline human experiments	Various		2004–2012	In 2004 GlaxoSmithKline (GSK) sponsored at least four medical trials using Hispanic and black children at New York's Incarnation Children's Center. Normally trials on children require parental consent but, as the infants were in care, New York's authorities held that role. Experiments were designed to test the "safety and tolerance" of AIDS medications, some of which have potentially dangerous side effects. In 2006, GSK and the US Army were criticized for Hepatitis E vaccine experiments conducted in 2003 on 2,000 soldiers of the Nepali Army. It was said that using soldiers as volunteers is unethical because they "could easily be coerced into taking part." In January 2012, GSK and two scientists who led the trials were fined approximately $240,000 in Argentina for "experimenting with human beings" and "falsifying parental authorization" during vaccine trials on 15,000 children under the age of one. Babies were recruited from poor families that visited public hospitals for medical treatment. Fourteen babies allegedly died as a result of the trials.
Death from prescription drugs	United States	Hull, Massachusetts	2006	Rebecca Riley, the daughter of Michael and Carolyn Riley of Massachusetts, was found dead in her home at age four, her lungs filled with fluid, after prolonged exposure to various medications. The medical examiner's office determined the girl died from "intoxication due to the combined effects" of prescription drugs. Police reports state she was taking 750 milligrams a day of Depakote, 200 milligrams a day of Seroquel, and .35 milligrams a day of Clonidine. Riley had been taking the drugs since the age of two for bipolar disorder and ADHD, diagnosed by child psychiatrist Kayoko Kifuji of the Tufts-New England Medical Center.
University of Minnesota Research Participant Dan Markingson	United States	Minnesota	2004	University of Minnesota research participant Dan Markingson committed suicide in May 2004 while enrolled in an industry-sponsored pharmaceutical trial comparing three FDA-approved atypical antipsychotics: Seroquel (quetiapine), Zyprexa (olanzapine), and Risperdal (risperidone). Writing on the circumstances surrounding Markingson's death in the study, which was designed and funded by Seroquel manufacturer AstraZeneca, University of Minnesota Professor of Bioethics Carl Elliott noted that Markingson was enrolled in the study against the wishes of his mother, Mary Weiss, and that he was forced to choose between enrolling in the study or being involuntarily committed to a state mental institution. Further investigation revealed financial ties to AstraZeneca by Markingson's psychiatrist, Dr. Stephen C. Olson, oversights and biases in AstraZeneca's trial design, and the inadequacy of university Institutional Review Board (IRB) protections for research subjects. Although a 2005 FDA investigation appeared to clear the university, greater awareness of the case stemming from Elliott's 2010 article in the magazine Mother Jones resulted in a group of university faculty members sending a public letter to the Board of Regents urging an external investigation into Markingson's death.

== Termination of mechanical ventilation and life support ==
Termination of life support
case	country	location	year	summary
Alta Fixsler case	United Kingdom	Manchester	2021	Parents wish to keep a child on life support.
Betancourt v. Trinitas Hospital	United States	New Jersey	2008	A hospital wishes to withhold treatment from someone whom it judges to have no chance of living.
Mordechai Dov Brody	United States	Brooklyn	2008	The parents of a brain-dead boy want to keep him on life support.
Cuthbertson v Rasouli	Canada	Toronto	2013	The wife of a brain-damaged man wants to keep him on life support.
Lantz v. Coleman	United States	Connecticut	2007	Prison officials question whether to force-feed inmates who are on hunger strike.
Charlie Gard case	United Kingdom	Great Ormond Street Hospital, London, England	2017	After losing a UK Supreme Court case, the parents of Gard, 10 months, petitioned the EU Court in France, and lost the final appeal. They wanted the hospital to allow them to travel to the U.S. for an experimental therapy that may have provided some temporary benefit but likely would not have improved his neurological condition, due to a mitochondrial DNA depletion disease (the treatment is nucleoside bypass therapy). At the least, they wanted for the hospital to continue to provide advanced life support palliative care for their son—respiration, nutrition, hydration—or to send him home on life support to eventually die, but those requests were also denied and support was turned off on July 27, 2017. Gard died the next day.
Tirhas Habtegiris	United States	Texas	2005	The hospital removes life support from an unconscious immigrant from Eritrea against her family's wishes. The family are in a foreign country and unable to travel.
Rom Houben	Belgium		2010	A man seems to be in a persistent vegetative state, and after 23 years a communication test is conducted.
Sun Hudson case	United States	Texas	2004	An infant is removed from life support against his mother's wishes.
Baby K	United States	Virginia	1992	The mother of an anencephalic baby wishes to keep the child on life support perpetually.
Jesse Koochin	United States	Salt Lake City	2004	Parents wish to keep a child on life support.
Spiro Nikolouzos case	United States	Texas	2005	A family wishes to keep life support for a man in a persistent vegetative state.
David Vetter	United States	Texas	1984	A boy dies at age 12 after living a lifetime with highly unusual medical care in a sterile environment.
Jahi McMath case	United States	California	2013	A teenage girl is declared brain-dead and her family wishes to keep her body on mechanical ventilation perpetually.

== Withholding life-prolonging medical treatment ==
Withholding life-prolonging treatment
case	country	location	year	summary
Baby Doe Law	United States	New York	1983	The parents of a child born with severe birth defects request the right to refuse treatment and keep the child off life support.
Baby M	Australia	Melbourne	1989	Parents and doctors agree to withhold life-prolonging measures from a severely disabled newborn baby, including surgeries and medication, while Right to Life activists claim the baby is murdered.

== Informed consent to medical treatment ==
Informed consent to medical treatment
case	country	location	year	summary
Christiane Völling	Germany		2011	Informed consent and involuntary sex reassignment in the case of an adult intersex woman.
Gillick competence	England		1985	The right of minors to request contraception from their doctor without parental consent.

== Person wishes for assisted suicide ==
Assisted suicide
case	country	location	year	summary
Betty and George Coumbias	Canada	Vancouver, British Columbia	2007	A couple request to have the legal right to commit suicide together, although only the husband is ill.
Dax Cowart	United States		1973	A man who suffered severe burns requests the right to die.
Giovanni Nuvoli	Italy	Alghero, Sardinia	2007	A man in pain requests to have a legal right to die.
Sue Rodriguez	Canada	Victoria, British Columbia	1991	A woman requests a right to assisted suicide.
Ramón Sampedro	Spain	Galicia	1998	For 29 years, a man requests his right to assisted suicide.
Noelia Castillo	Spain	Barcelona	2026	A woman requests to have a legal right to euthanasia.
Aruna Shanbaug case	India	Karnataka	2011	A writ petition under Article 32 of the Constitution is filed on behalf of the petitioner Aruna Ramachandra Shanbaug by activist, author and journalist Pinki Virani, claiming to be a next friend.
Piergiorgio Welby	Italy	Rome	2006	A patient requests to have a legal right to die.

== Person wishes for euthanasia for another ==
Euthanasia of another
case	country	location	year	summary
Andrew Bedner	United States	White River Junction, Vermont	2008	A man is charged with critically harming his child, who is on life support. If the child dies, the man may be charged with murder.
Tony Bland	England	Sheffield	1993	Bland was the first patient in English legal history to be allowed to die by the courts through the withdrawal of life-prolonging treatment.
Carol Carr	United States	Georgia	2002	A mother shoots and kills her adult sons to relieve their suffering from Huntington's disease.
Cruzan v. Director, Missouri Department of Health	United States	Missouri	1990	The parents of a woman in a persistent vegetative state request the right to remove her life support equipment.
Eluana Englaro	Italy	Lecco	1992	Parents receive permission to remove the life support from a woman in a persistent vegetative state for 17 years.
June Hartley	United States	California	2009	A woman euthanizes her brother after he has medical problems.
Jack Kevorkian	United States	Michigan	1994	A medical doctor advocates for assisted suicide and the right to die.
Robert Latimer	Canada	Saskatchewan	1993	A man euthanizes his child who has lived in pain for years.
Karen Ann Quinlan case	United States	New Jersey	1976	A 21-year-old girl is in a persistent vegetative state. Her parents wish to remove her from artificial respiration.
Terri Schiavo case	United States	Florida	2005	A woman is in a persistent vegetative state. Her husband wishes to remove her life support. Her parents wish her to remain on life support.
Marlise Muñoz	United States	Texas	2013	A woman is declared brain-dead by her physician. Her husband and family wish to remove life support. The hospital persists in keeping her on life support because it claims it cannot legally withdraw life support from a pregnant patient.
