= Maternal somatic support after brain death =

Medical practice

Maternal somatic support after brain death occurs when a brain dead patient is pregnant and her body is kept alive to deliver a fetus. It occurs very rarely internationally. Even among brain dead patients, in a U.S. study of 252 brain dead patients from 1990–96, only 5 (2.8%) cases involved pregnant women between 15 and 45 years of age.

== Past cases ==
In the 28-year period between 1982 and 2010, there were "30 [reported] cases of maternal brain death (19 case reports and 1 case series)." In 12 of those cases, a viable child was delivered via cesarean section after extended somatic support. However, according to Esmaeilzadeh, et al. there is no widely accepted protocol to manage a brain dead mother "since only a few reported cases are found in the medical literature." Moreover, the mother's wishes are rarely, if ever, known, and family should be consulted in developing a care plan.

== Life support complications ==
Throughout their care, brain dead patients could experience a wide range of complications, including "infection, hemodynamic instability, diabetes insipidus (DI), panhypopituitarism, poikilothermia, metabolic instability, acute respiratory distress syndrome and disseminated intravascular coagulation." Treating these complications is difficult since the effects of medication on the fetus's health are unknown.

== Fetus's chance of survival ==
According to Esmaeilzadeh, et al., "[a]t present, it seems that there is no clear lower limit to the gestational age which would restrict the physician's efforts to support the brain dead mother and her fetus." However, it is likely that the older a fetus is when its mother becomes brain dead, the greater its chance for survival, since survival odds in cases of preterm birth improve with increasing gestational age.

== Brain death vs. similar conditions ==
It is important to understand the similarities and differences between brain death and two other conditions: persistent vegetative state and coma.

=== Difference between brain death and persistent vegetative state ===
Patients in a persistent vegetative state "are alive but also have severely impaired consciousness, although their eyes may open spontaneously. The eye opening may give the impression of consciousness, but there is no awareness of the environment. These patients do not acknowledge the examiner; they do not attend or track objects that are presented to them; their movements are non-purposeful; they do not speak." The difference between the two states is that brain death means "death of the brainstem" which can be clinically diagnosed and vegetative state means "permanent and total loss of forebrain function" which needs further investigation.

=== Difference between brain death and coma ===
People in comas have "presence of brain stem responses, spontaneous breathing or non-purposeful motor responses." However, comas can result in brain death, or recovery or even a persistent vegetative state.

== United States federal and state laws ==
Several laws have bearing in situations that involve maternal somatic support after brain death. The Federal Patient Self-Determination Act (PSDA) requires health care institutions to provide newly admitted adult patients with information regarding advance health care directives. The intent of this law is to make patients aware of their rights with regard to end-of-life care.

State laws have also proven important in cases involving maternal somatic support. The Texas Advance Directives Act, also referred to as the Texas Futile Care Law, provides hospitals with discretion over continuing the provision of life support, and voids advance directive wishes for patients who are pregnant. This Texas law served as a point of contention in the Death of Marlise Muñoz—a situation in which end-of-life care became entangled with abortion laws and politics. Marlise Muñoz was 14 weeks pregnant when this incident occurred, and while an abortion was, at the time, legal at 14 weeks in Texas, the state's law dictates that a hospital must provide life support for pregnant women. Absent from the legislation are specifics as to how the law should be applied depending on how far along a woman is in her pregnancy, as well as the definition of terminally ill versus brain dead. This Texas law does not specifically detail a hospital's obligation in the case when a pregnant woman is brain dead, thus leading to the long-drawn legal battle that ensued in the weeks following Marlise Muñoz's pulmonary embolism. Texas is one of several states that have laws that pertain to pregnant women and advance directives or Do Not Resuscitate (DNR) directives. Specifically, 26 states have laws that ignore advance directives when a woman is terminally ill, but pregnant. This recent situation involving Marlise Muñoz raised a host of questions related to unborn fetuses, patient and family preferences, and hospital discretion in interpreting state laws that involve advance directives.

== Cost of care ==
The cost of maintaining a brain dead mother on life support depends on the number of days spent in the Intensive Care Unit (ICU). One might consider that every day (after viability) that the fetus is in utero is a day in which fetal development occurs and represents one day less that the fetus would have to be in the neonatal ICU (NICU). A 2005 study found the average cost of medical ventilation for adults in the ICU to be $1,500 per day and long-term ICU care to be approximately $5,000 per day. Of the twelve viable children known to be delivered from brain dead mothers on prolonged somatic support between 1982 and 2010, the mean gestational age at the time of brain death was 22 weeks and the mean gestational age at delivery was 29.5 weeks, leading to an average length of somatic support for the mothers in the ICU of 7.5 weeks (52.5 days).

The cost of a cesarean section, the recommended mode of delivery for brain dead pregnant women, is roughly $4,500 for physicians' fees alone, according to the Healthcare Bluebook. Depending upon how many weeks a neonate is premature, he or she could spend anywhere between two and four months in the NICU. NICU costs generally run more than $3,500 per day. The most recent peer-reviewed investigation to note the overall cost of care for a viable child delivered from a somatically supported brain dead mother focused on the case of a child delivered via cesarean section in California on the 63rd hospital day at 31 weeks gestation, to a mother who was brain dead at 22 weeks gestation in 1983. The costs for maternal care in that case were $183,081 and those for neonatal care were $34,703. The average household income in the U.S. in 1983 was $29,184. The death of Marlise Muñoz at John Peter Smith Hospital in Fort Worth, TX was the most recently publicized instance of somatic support of a brain dead pregnant woman from 2013-2014. The hospital declined to reveal how much it cost to treat Muñoz. Ascertaining the costs of treatment for such episodes of care may be difficult given that the billing procedures of many hospitals rely on the costs listed in each hospital's chargemaster. Costs maintained on the chargemaster differ greatly from hospital to hospital and there is little transparency detailing many hospitals' chargemaster listings. The Patient Protection and Affordable Care Act (ACA) does have a provision, Sect. 2718 (c), that requires all hospitals to publish a list of their "standard charges", but the Department of Health and Human Services has not issued a rule to implement that provision.

== Payment for care ==
It is uncertain if government or private health insurance would pay for extended somatic support for a brain dead pregnant woman and how much of care costs a family may have to pay. In the death of Marlise Muñoz at John Peter Smith Hospital, the hospital declined to reveal who would pay for the extended medical care provided.

== Ethical considerations ==
Ethical decisions to prolong somatic survival for a brain dead pregnant woman take on several views, with decisions often influenced by the gestational age of the fetus at the time the woman sustained injury. Beneficence and right to life for both the fetus and mother guide many ethical arguments. If prolonging the mother's life is likely to have a positive outcome for the fetus, it can be considered ethical. Drawing upon the principle of beneficence, Dillon et al. and Loewy propose the following rubric when determining whether or not to offer life support to a pregnant, brain dead woman:

- If the fetus suffers from the event as the mother suffers, life support should not be provided.
- Pregnancy before 24 Weeks Gestation: Life support administered to the mother for the sake of the fetus should not be provided.
- Pregnancy from 24–28 Weeks Gestation: Intervention should be provided only after educating decision-makers of potential risks.
- Pregnancy after 28 Weeks Gestation: Intervention should be provided until fetus can be delivered or the mother's condition worsens.

A second view considers the autonomy of the mother and her right to die. For example, the FIGO Committee for the Ethical Aspects of Human Reproduction and Women's Health has published Brain Death and Pregnancy, a report to help clinicians, healthcare administrators, and families evaluate the ethical considerations surrounding women's health. Within this report the committee establishes that healthcare providers are first responsible to the woman, and then to the unborn fetus. The report concludes by stating, "Women have the right to die in dignity. The goal of fetal rescue does not exonerate healthcare givers from the duty to respect this right of the primary patient—the woman."

A third view considers the cognizance of the mother. The mother is responsible for the well-being of her fetus as long as she recognizes its existence. When a pregnant woman becomes brain dead, the mother can no longer acknowledge the fetus; as such, the mother no longer has a moral responsibility for keeping the fetus alive. Without an advance directive stating that the woman wishes to be kept alive to save her unborn child, prolonging life is unethical.

Finally, some ethicists have argued that there are no ethical dilemmas inherent in the case of a pregnant woman who is declared brain dead. They argue that because the brain dead patient is no longer alive, he or she ceases to be a patient; the continuation of ventilation in an effort to save the fetus can be considered a medical experiment that requires ethics committee or IRB-approval before a facility can perform this work.

== Public opinion and activism ==
Keeping a medically declared brain dead woman on life support to sustain a potentially viable fetus is a topic of considerable debate and controversy. Such circumstances involve considerable moral, ethical, biological and legal issues. There is heavy discourse between biomedical and legal experts regarding whether a dead person is "a dysfunctional incubator" to an unborn fetus. And, further deliberation surrounds a woman's rights under the 14th Amendment to make medical decisions about her own body. There is also question about the intervening capacity of state authority in such cases, particularly in states like Texas, which prohibit medical officials from withdrawing life support from a pregnant patient. Public opinion is depicted as being shaped by individual beliefs pertaining to related matters of end-of-life care, abortion, female reproductive rights and the rights of an unborn child. Personal viewpoints are also shaped by religious beliefs. Arguments have been made in favor of or against preserving the somatic function of a dead pregnant woman. These disputes are often spearheaded by activist groups that advocate one of these two positions. Opponents of life-sustaining efforts, when it conflicts with a woman's wishes, include pro-choice groups, like NARAL Pro-Choice America. These dispute government, state and/or religious institutional interventions to make decisions against an individual's own wishes, which they argue renders advance directives meaningless and fails to protect women.

Supporters in favor of life-sustaining efforts include anti-abortion advocacy groups (e.g. Secular Pro-Life, National Black Pro-Life Coalition and Operation Rescue), as well as some legislators, who advocate protecting the life of a fetus.

== Notable cases ==
On 2 August 2005 in Virginia (U.S.), a newborn was delivered prematurely to mother Susan Torres who was declared brain-dead after a stroke caused by skin cancer on 7 May 2005. Torres was on life support since her 14th week of pregnancy. The newborn later died on 12 September 2005 during surgery for intestinal complications of premature birth.

On 4 April 2015 in Nebraska (U.S), a newborn was delivered prematurely after mother Karla Perez was declared brain-dead due to a brain hemorrhage in February 2015. Perez was declared dead 6 April 2015.

On 26 August 2019 in Brno (Czech Republic) a newborn was delivered in 34th week of pregnancy to a mother declared brain-dead after a stroke. The mother was on life support since her 16th week of pregnancy.

In February 2025 in Georgia (U.S.), Adriana Smith was declared brain dead due to a stroke in her ninth week of pregnancy and was kept on life support without her family's consent. According to the hospital, taking her off life support would violate Georgia's abortion law, which prohibits abortion after six weeks. The case was a subject of controversy regarding medical ethics, abortion laws, consent, and racial equity in healthcare in the U.S. The newborn was delivered prematurely on June 13, 2025. Smith was taken off of life support four days later.

== See also ==
- Death of Marlise Muñoz
- Adriana Smith pregnancy case
- Susan Torres
