= Euthanasia in the United States =

Active euthanasia is illegal in all 50 states of the United States. Assisted suicide is legal in twelve jurisdictions in the US: Washington, D.C. and the states of California, Colorado, Delaware, Oregon, Vermont, New Mexico, Maine, New Jersey, Hawaii, Washington, New York and Montana. The status of assisted suicide is disputed in Montana, though currently authorized per the Montana Supreme Court's ruling in Baxter v. Montana that "nothing in Montana Supreme Court precedent or Montana statutes [indicates] that physician aid in dying is against public policy."

== Early history ==
Debates about the ethics of euthanasia and physician-assisted suicide date from ancient Greece and Rome. After the development of ether, physicians began advocating the use of anesthetics to relieve the pain of death. In 1870, Williams first proposed using anesthetics and morphine to intentionally end a patient's life. Over the next 35 years, debates about euthanasia raged in the United States which resulted in an Ohio bill to legalize euthanasia in 1906, a bill that was ultimately defeated.

Euthanasia advocacy in the U.S. peaked again during the 1930s and diminished significantly during and after World War II. Euthanasia efforts were revived during the 1960s and 1970s, under the right-to-die rubric, physician assisted death in liberal bioethics, and through advance directives and do not resuscitate orders.

Several major court cases advanced the legal rights of patients, or their guardians, to withdraw medical support with the expected outcome of death. These include the Karen Ann Quinlan case (1976), Brophy and Nancy Cruzan cases. More recent years have seen policies fine-tuned and re-stated, as with Washington v. Glucksberg (1997) and the Terri Schiavo case. The numerous legislative rulings and legal precedents that were brought about in the wake of the Quinlan case had their ethical foundation in the famous 1983 report completed by the President's Commission for the Study of Ethical Problems in Medicine, under the title "Deciding to Forgo Life-Sustaining Treatment." The Commission sustained in its findings that it was morally acceptable to give up a life-supporting therapy and that withholding or withdrawing such a therapy is the same thing from an ethical stand-point, while artificial feeding and other life-supporting therapy are of the same importance for the patients and doctors. Before this report, to withdraw a medical therapy was regarded as much more serious decision than not to start a therapy at all, while artificial feeding was viewed as a special treatment. By 1990, barely a decade and a half after the New Jersey Supreme Court’s historic decision, patients were well aware that they could decline any form of medical therapy if they simply choose to do that either directly or by expressing their wish via appointed representative.

In a 2004 article in the Bulletin of the History of Medicine, Brown University historian Jacob M. Appel documented extensive political debate over legislation to legalize physician-assisted suicide in both Iowa and Ohio in 1906. The driving force behind this movement was social activist Anna S. Hall. Canadian historian Ian Dowbiggin's 2003 book, A Merciful End, revealed the role that leading public figures, including Clarence Darrow and Jack London, played in advocating for the legalization of euthanasia.

== Legislation and political movements ==
=== California ===
In the 1983 case of Barber v. Superior Court, two physicians had honored a family's request to withdraw both respirator and intravenous feeding and hydration tubes from a comatose patient. The physicians were charged with murder, despite the fact that they were doing what the family wanted. The court held that all charges should be dropped because the treatments had all been ineffective and burdensome. Withdrawal of treatment, even if life-ending, is morally and legally permitted and is considered passive euthanasia. Competent patients or their surrogates can decide to withdraw treatments, usually after the treatments are found ineffective, painful, or burdensome.

=== New Jersey ===
In the United States legal and ethical debates about euthanasia became more prominent in the Karen Ann Quinlan case who went into a coma after allegedly mixing tranquilizers with alcohol, surviving biologically for 9 years in a "persistent vegetative state" even after the New Jersey Supreme Court approval to remove her from a respirator. This case caused a widespread public concern about "lives not worth living", and the possibility of at least voluntary euthanasia if it could be ascertained that the patient would not have wanted to live in this condition.

=== Texas ===
In 1999, the state of Texas passed the Advance Directives Act. Under the law, in some situations, Texas hospitals and physicians have the right to withdraw life support measures, such as mechanical respiration, from terminally ill patients when such treatment is considered to be both futile and inappropriate. This is sometimes referred to as "passive euthanasia".

In 2005, a six-month-old infant, Sun Hudson, with a uniformly fatal disease thanatophoric dysplasia, was the first patient in which "a United States court has allowed life-sustaining treatment to be withdrawn from a pediatric patient over the objections of the child's parent".

=== Massachusetts ===
Currently, euthanasia is illegal in Massachusetts. According to Ch. 201D §12 Massachusetts states that "Nothing in this chapter shall be construed to constitute, condone, authorize, or approve suicide or mercy killing or to permit any affirmative or deliberate act to end one's own life other than to permit the natural process of dying". Even though euthanasia as well as physician assisted suicide is not legal in Massachusetts, the Supreme Court ruled in 1997 to not allow euthanasia or physician assisted suicide, but to give the freedom to the patient to refuse life supporting medical care by making these two laws different from one another. So now although there is no euthanasia in Massachusetts, one is allowed to refuse artificial life support measures.

=== Unsuccessful initiatives ===
Attempts to legalize euthanasia and assisted suicide resulted in ballot initiatives and legislation bills within the United States in the last 35 years. For example, Washington voters saw Ballot Initiative 119 in 1991, California placed Proposition 161 on the ballot in 1992, and Michigan included Proposal B in their ballot in 1998.

== U.S. public opinion ==
In the U.S., there is a wide range of public opinion about euthanasia and the right-to-die movement in the United States.

=== Opinions of the general public ===
Since 1947, Gallup polling has regularly asked thousands of American citizens: “When a person has a disease that cannot be cured, do you think doctors should be allowed to end the patient’s life by some painless means if the patient and his family request it?” to gauge public opinion on euthanasia. The question leaves unclear the diagnosis, age, or background of the patient and the legality of the situation. However, the question does clarify that the euthanasia is, in this case, voluntary. Support for euthanasia has increased from 37% in 1947 to a peak of 75% in 2005; however, support fell back to 64% in 2012. Gallup also uses a different phrasing to capture opinions of physician-assisted suicide instead of euthanasia by using terms like "severe pain, suicide, legalization." However, in these scenarios, support falls by roughly 10-15% showing that support for euthanasia is higher than support for physician-assisted suicide among the general population. This is an interesting discrepancy as there are no states in which voluntary euthanasia is legal, but at least 5 in which physician-assisted suicide is legal.

=== Physicians' opinions ===
A recent review studied surveys, interviews, and death certificates from 1947-2016 to gain insight into physician opinions on both physician-assisted suicide and euthanasia. In the U.S., less than 20% of physicians reported any patients asking for assistance with euthanasia or physician-assisted suicide; 5% or fewer reported agreeing to assist patients with euthanasia or physician-assisted suicide requests. In Oregon and Washington state, where physician-assisted suicide is legal, less than 1% of physicians prescribe medications for physician-assisted death each year. In other countries, these percentages were much higher - for example, 60% of Dutch physicians have prescribed medication for physician-assisted suicide; in the Netherlands and Belgium, over half of doctors reported patient requests for aid in dying. The study found a large percentage of these requests to be associated with cancer and to be for patients who were "older, white, and well-educated".

Opinions among physicians are harder to elucidate and have much smaller sample sizes than for the general public, and therefore may not be as accurate. Physicians surveyed were less likely to support either physician-assisted suicide or euthanasia than the public. Unlike the public opinion, physicians were more comfortable with physician-assisted suicide than euthanasia. In other countries where both are legal, namely Belgium and the Netherlands, physicians are much more supportive with a roughly 85% support rate.

=== Opinions by religious affiliation ===
In various studies from the 1990s, previously surveyed religious groups reported that religiosity (i.e., self-evaluation and frequency of worship service attendance) correlated to opinions on euthanasia. Individuals who attended church regularly and more frequently and considered themselves more religious were found to be more opposed to euthanasia than to those who had a lower level of religiosity. However, this study represents decades old data that is not confirmed by newer sources.

In more recent studies, a gap is exposed in the meaning of the word "religion" and how it relates to individual views on euthanasia. Evidently, there are vast differences between religious observers between and within religious sects. The deep differences among different religions, especially those religions not prevalent in the Western world, have been ill-accounted for in the vast majority of studies attempting to link euthanasia and religious views. Future research needs to better elucidate which religious views they correlate to views on euthanasia, with less emphasis on which religion/sect a person "belongs" to, as this may lead to clearer correlation between which beliefs are more or less likely to influence opinions on euthanasia.

== See also ==
- Assisted suicide in the United States
- Brittany Maynard
- Principle of double effect
