= Ethical issues in psychiatry =

Ethical issues in psychiatry are discussed in the following articles:

- Psychiatry#Ethics
- Anti-psychiatry
- List of medical ethics cases
- Pharmaceutical marketing
- Political abuse of psychiatry
- Scientology and psychiatry
- Medical ethics
