= Jill Singer =

Australian journalist, writer and television presenter

- Born: Jill Leonie Singer; 1957; Korumburra, Victoria, Australia
- Died: 8 June 2017 (aged 60); Melbourne, Victoria, Australia
- Occupation: Journalist
- Children: 1

Jill Leonie Singer (1957 – 8 June 2017) was an Australian journalist, writer and television presenter.

== Career ==
Singer began her career in journalism as an ABC radio trainee in 1984. She eventually became a senior reporter for The 7.30 Report on the ABC and later presented the Victorian edition of Today Tonight on the Seven Network.

She presented The 7.30 Report, The Arts Show, 2-shot and People Dimensions (ABC TV). She was the executive producer of ABC TV's national morning news and current affairs program First Edition. She wrote a weekly column for Melbourne's Herald Sun newspaper between 1997 and 2012, and lectured in television journalism at RMIT University in Melbourne. She made regular appearances on The Conversation Hour (ABC 774) and on Sky News Australia's Melbourne Report. In 2005 she published a book about commercial surrogacy, Immaculate Conceptions : Thoughts on babies, breeding and boundaries.

== Awards ==
In 1992, Singer won the Walkley Award for Best Investigative Television Journalist for Baby M, a story on the death of an infant with severe abnormalities. In 1997, Singer was highly commended at the Quill Awards for her Herald Sun column. In 1999, Singer won the Quill Award for Best Television Current Affairs report for an investigation into ExxonMobil.

In 2010, Singer and Lisa Whitehead won the Quill Award for Best Television Current Affairs (less than 15 minutes) for a report on flaws in the criminal justice system's treatment of domestic violence victims.

== Personal life and death ==
In February 2017, Singer was diagnosed with terminal AL amyloidosis. On 8 June 2017, a post by her family on Singer's Facebook page announced that she had died at the age of 60 in Melbourne, Victoria. She had married two months earlier on 8 April 2017, and had a daughter from her first marriage.
