= Worrall Frederick Mountain =

American judge (1909–1992)

Worrall Frederick Mountain (June 28, 1909 – August 24, 1992) was a justice of the New Jersey Supreme Court from 1971 to 1979.

== Background ==
Mountain was born in East Orange, the son of Worrall Frederick Mountain, who had once served as the city's mayor. He graduated from Princeton University in 1931 and Harvard Law School in 1934. He was an associate with the Newark firm of Pitney, Hardin & Skinner and in 1940, he left to form the law firm of Mills, Jeffers & Mountain in Morristown. He served in the U.S. Navy during World War II.

== New Jersey courts ==
Mountain was elevated to the bench in 1966 and served in the New Jersey Superior Court and sat in the Appellate Division from 1970 to 1971. He was appointed to the Supreme Court by Governor of New Jersey William T. Cahill. He participated in such landmark cases as the discriminatory zoning matter of Southern Burlington County NAACP v. Mount Laurel in 1975, and the 1976 right-to-die decision regarding In re Quinlan.

== Later life, death, and legacy ==
Mountain retired from the bench in 1979, after which he returned to private practice. He resided in Hightstown. He died on August 24, 1992. An American Inns of Court bears his name.

== See also ==
- List of justices of the Supreme Court of New Jersey
