= Carl Elliott (philosopher) =

American philosopher

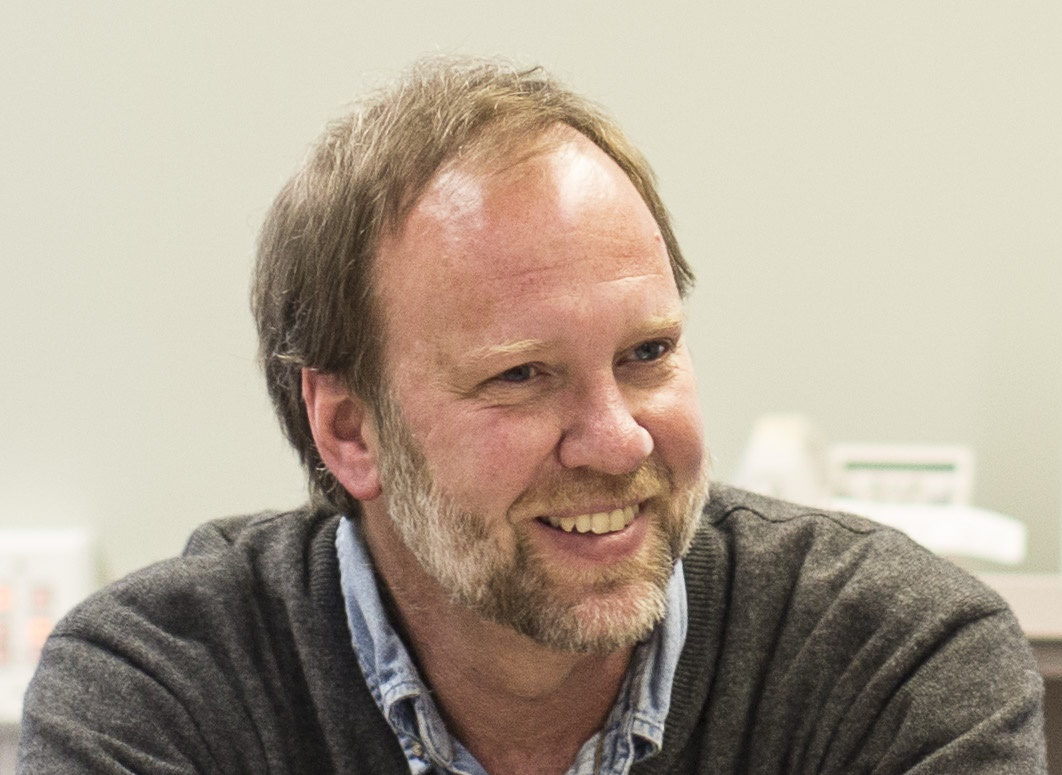
- Born: July 25, 1961 (age 65); South Carolina, U.S.

Academic background
- Education: Davidson College (BS); University of Glasgow (PhD); Medical University of South Carolina (MD)

Academic work
- Discipline: Philosophy
- Sub-discipline: Bioethics
- Institutions: McGill University; East Carolina University; University of Otago; University of Minnesota

Carl Elliott (born July 25, 1961) is an American philosopher working as a professor in department of philosophy at the University of Minnesota.

== Early life and education ==
A native of South Carolina, Elliott was educated at Davidson College in North Carolina and at the University of Glasgow in Scotland, where he received his PhD in philosophy. He received his MD from the Medical University of South Carolina.

== Career ==
Prior to his appointment at the University of Minnesota in 1997 he was on the faculty of McGill University in Montreal. He has held postdoctoral or visiting appointments at the University of Chicago, East Carolina University, the University of Otago in New Zealand, and the University of Natal Medical School (now the Nelson R. Mandela School of Medicine), the first medical school in South Africa for non-white students.

Elliott received a Guggenheim Fellowship and a National Endowment for the Humanities Public Scholar Award in 2018. He was the Cary and Ann Maguire Chair in Ethics and American History at the John W. Kluge Center at the United States Library of Congress in 2019. He is a Member of the Institute for Advanced Study in Princeton, New Jersey, where he led a faculty seminar on bioethics in 2003–2004, and an honorary faculty member of the University of Otago Bioethics Centre in New Zealand. He is a fellow of the Hastings Center, an independent bioethics research institution.

Elliott's scholarly interests include the influence of market forces on medicine, the ethics of enhancement technologies, research ethics, the philosophy of psychiatry, and the work of Ludwig Wittgenstein and Walker Percy. His articles have appeared in The New Yorker, Mother Jones, The Atlantic Monthly, The London Review of Books, The Believer, The American Prospect and Dissent. He is known for often taking darkly comic approaches to serious or offbeat topics. His New Yorker article, "Guinea Pigging", covered professional research subjects, while an article in the December 2000 Atlantic Monthly discussed the phenomenon of apotemnophilia, the desire for amputation of a healthy limb. He has also written several satirical pieces, including an article for the American Prospect on Extreme Psychiatry as a reality TV show, and a piece for the Ruminator Review on "how to become an academic failure."

Elliott has authored or edited seven books, including A Philosophical Disease: Bioethics, Culture and Identity (Routledge, 1999), Better than Well: American Medicine Meets the American Dream (W.W. Norton, 2003), and White Coat, Black Hat: Adventures on the Dark Side of Medicine (Beacon Press, 2010). In 2011, Elliott won the Erikson Institute Prize for Excellence in Mental Health Media. His latest book is The Occasional Human Sacrifice: Medical Experimentation and the Price of Saying No (W.W. Norton, 2024), about whistleblowers who've spoke out against abusive medical research.

=== Dan Markingson ===
Elliott became well known for his advocacy around the death of Dan Markingson, a mentally ill man under a civil commitment order who committed suicide after being pressured into an industry-funded antipsychotic study at the University of Minnesota. Elliott wrote critically about the way the university handled the case in a Mother Jones article in 2010. Although the University of Minnesota denied any wrongdoing for years, it was forced to suspend recruitment into psychiatric drug studies after a scathing investigation by the Minnesota Office of the Legislative Auditor.
