= Death of Dan Markingson =

Controversial suicide case

Dan Markingson (November 25, 1976 – May 8, 2004) was a man from St. Paul, Minnesota who died by suicide in an ethically controversial psychiatric research study at the University of Minnesota. For nearly eleven years, University of Minnesota officials defended the conduct of its researchers, despite significant public criticism, numerous news reports, and pressure for an external investigation. In March 2015, an investigation by a state watchdog agency found a number of major ethical violations in the case, including serious conflicts of interest and financial incentives, poor oversight of the study, pressure on Markingson to join the study while he was in a highly vulnerable state, and a series of misleading public statements by university officials. Shortly afterward, the university suspended recruitment into psychiatric research studies. On April 9, 2015, Charles Schulz, MD, announced his resignation as Chair of the Department of Psychiatry.

Because of the many ethical issues involved in Markingson's story, it is now used as a case study in many university bioethics courses.

== Markingson and the CAFÉ study ==
Dan Markingson was raised in St. Paul, Minnesota by his mother, Mary Weiss, and earned a degree in English literature from the University of Michigan. In the summer of 2003, when he was 26 years old, Markingson was living in Los Angeles, where he hoped to become a screenwriter. During a visit to Los Angeles, Weiss became alarmed at changes in her son's behavior that suggested he was seriously mentally ill. She persuaded him to return to St. Paul. On November 12, 2003, Markingson spoke about an apocalyptic "storm" in which he would be required to murder people, including his mother. As a result, he was admitted to a locked psychiatric unit at Fairview University Medical Center. His treating physician was Dr. Stephen Olson, an associate professor in the University of Minnesota's Department of Psychiatry.

After starting Markingson on risperidone, an antipsychotic drug, Olson wrote in support of a petition for an involuntary commitment order that would send Markingson to Anoka Metropolitan Regional Treatment Center, a long-term state psychiatric hospital. A judge granted the commitment order on November 17, 2003. Two other clinicians examined Markingson as part of the commitment process and both noted Markingson's extremely disordered thinking. Shortly afterward, Olson requested that the court grant Markingson a stay of commitment, which permitted Markingson to avoid involuntary confinement at Anoka as long as he agreed to abide by the Fairview University Medical Center treatment plan. A judge granted that request on November 20, 2003.

Rather than simply treating Markingson, however, Olson asked Markingson to enroll in the AstraZeneca-sponsored CAFÉ study, which compared three atypical antipsychotic drugs. The CAFÉ study was a year-long, double-blinded study aimed at patients experiencing their first episode of psychosis.

On November 21, 2003, one day after the stay of commitment was granted, Jean Kenney, a study coordinator, had Markingson sign an informed consent form for the CAFÉ study when his mother, Mary Weiss, was not present. Weiss strongly objected to her son's enrollment in the research study, but her objections were dismissed.

Two weeks later, Markingson was discharged to Theo House, a residential facility for the mentally ill in St. Paul. He was required to sign an aftercare agreement stating that he understood that he could be returned to involuntary confinement if he failed to take his study medication or keep his CAFÉ study appointments.

Over the course of the next five months, Mary Weiss became convinced that Markingson's condition was deteriorating and tried repeatedly to have him removed from the CAFÉ study. She warned the University of Minnesota research team that Markingson was in danger of suicide. On April 11, 2004, she left a voice mail message for the study coordinator, Jean Kenney, asking "Do we have to wait until he kills himself or anyone else before anyone does anything?" On May 8, Markingson killed himself with a box cutter, nearly decapitating himself. Laboratory tests later revealed that he had been taking quetiapine, produced by AstraZeneca.

== Responses to Markingson's death ==
The University of Minnesota Institutional Review Board received a serious adverse event report from Olson, but did not review any medical records or interview anyone other than Olson. On July 22, 2005, the Food and Drug Administration issued an Establishment Inspection Report. The FDA inspector, Sharon Matson, found no violations.

However, an investigation by the state Ombudsman for Mental Health and Mental Retardation found several areas of concern. In a letter on June 17, 2005, the Ombudsman's office pointed out that patients under a civil commitment (involuntary commitment) order are especially vulnerable and need special protection. The letter also noted a conflict of interest, since Olson had served as both Markingson's treating physician and the principal investigator of the study into which he recruited Markingson.

In January, 2007, Mary Weiss filed a lawsuit against the University of Minnesota, but a Hennepin County judge ruled that the university had statutory (or discretionary) immunity. The judge allowed a malpractice suit against Olson to proceed, which was settled for $75,000. The University of Minnesota then filed a notice to assess costs against Mary Weiss, demanding $57,000. The university agreed to drop the demand if Weiss agreed not to appeal the immunity ruling.

The Markingson case was first brought to public attention when the St. Paul Pioneer Press published a 3-part series in May 2008. The Pioneer Press series raised concerns about the financial ties Olson and his CAFÉ study co-investigator, Charles Schulz, the Chair of the Department of Psychiatry, had to AstraZeneca and other pharmaceutical companies. It also noted that recruitment into the CAFÉ study had increased dramatically after the University of Minnesota had established a special unit for psychotic patients called Station 12 in which every patient was evaluated for potential recruitment into a research study.

In 2009, the Minnesota state legislature passed "Dan's Law," which placed significant restrictions on the ability of psychiatrists to recruit patients under civil commitment (involuntary commitment) orders into psychiatric drug studies.

In August 2010, Mother Jones magazine published an article on the Markingson case by Carl Elliott, a professor in the University of Minnesota's Center for Bioethics. AstraZeneca, the sponsor of the CAFÉ study, had paid $520 million to settle a federal lawsuit for fraudulent marketing of its antipsychotic, Seroquel. Unsealed documents provided evidence that AstraZeneca had suppressed unfavorable research studies and manipulated study results. Elliott cited the opinion of several experts that the CAFÉ study had been designed to produce a positive result for Seroquel.

In response, the University of Minnesota issued the first of a number of public statements claiming that the Markingson case had already been thoroughly investigated and that no investigation had found fault with university researchers.

In November 2012, the Minnesota Board of Social Work issued a "corrective action" against the CAFÉ study coordinator, Jean Kenney, for numerous lapses. Among its findings were that Kenney had performed medical tasks beyond her competency and failed to inform Markingson of new metabolic risks of quetiapine (Seroquel) when the study sponsor notified investigators.

On May 16, 2013, Aaron Friedman, the Dean of the University of Minnesota Medical School and vice-president for Health Sciences, published an editorial in the Minneapolis Star Tribune stating that the death of Dan Markingson was "not a scandal" and that "it is time to stop blaming our university and our researchers."

On December 5, 2013, the University of Minnesota Faculty Senate voted to endorse a "Resolution on the Matter of the Markingson Case," in response to a letter from 175 scholars in bioethics and related disciplines asking for an investigation of Markingson's death. Eric Kaler, the president of the University of Minnesota, agreed to commission an external review, but excluded the Markingson case from the investigation.

Six months later, another University of Minnesota research subject, Robert Huber, revealed publicly that he had been recruited into a study of an unapproved antipsychotic drug, bifeprunox, under circumstances similar to those of Dan Markingson. Shortly afterward, the Office of the Legislative Auditor, a state watchdog agency, agreed to investigate the Markingson case. In November, Niki Gjere, a clinical nurse specialist at University of Minnesota Medical Center at Fairview, told Fox 9 News that she had objected to Markingson's enrollment in the CAFÉ study in 2003 but her objections were ignored. She also said that nurses were "badgered and pressured" into finding subjects for psychiatric drug studies.

== Results of investigations ==
On February 27, 2015, the university released an external review commissioned in light of the Faculty Senate resolution and managed by the Association for the Accreditation of Human Research Protection Programs. The review leveled harsh criticism at the university for a number of problems, including inadequate scientific review of research studies by the Institutional Review Board, poor training of researchers, a defensive posture by university officials toward criticism, and a "culture of fear" in the Department of Psychiatry, where staff members provided "stories of intimidation" and "fear of retaliation" if they spoke up about safety violations.

Three weeks later, the Office of the Legislative Auditor released its report, "A Clinical Drug Study at the University of Minnesota Department of Psychiatry: The Dan Markingson Case." Noting that Markingson was an "extraordinarily vulnerable" subject, the report presented evidence of coercive recruitment practices, serious conflicts of interest, an inadequate response to the concerns of Mary Weiss, and a "superficial review" of Markingson's suicide by the university's Institutional Review Board. It also found a significant conflict of interest in an investigation of Stephen Olson, MD, by the state Board of Medical Practice. The Legislative Auditor pointed out the behavior of University of Minnesota officials as an issue of special concern, noting that university leaders made "misleading statements about previous reviews and been consistently unwilling to discuss or even acknowledge that serious ethical issues and conflicts are involved."

In response, university leaders suspended recruitment into psychiatric research studies and announced a plan to reform policies and procedures at the university.

== Outstanding issues ==
The investigations into Markingson's death have concluded, but problems in the Department of Psychiatry have continued.

On April 17, 2015, the New York Times reported that Charles Schulz, who had recently stepped down as Chair of the Department of Psychiatry, had enrolled two residents of a sex offender facility in a study of quetiapine for borderline personality disorder. According to the director of the facility, however, neither resident had a diagnosis of borderline personality disorder. One resident, a cook at the facility, had crushed up a large quantity of quetiapine and mixed it into the morning oatmeal. According to the Times, this episode "did not seem to ruffle the university oversight board that is charged with looking into such episodes." A complaint was submitted to the Food and Drug Administration.

On May 6, the university released the results of an investigation into the treatment of Robert Huber. It found that Huber had not been coerced into the bifeprunox research study, despite being confined to a locked unit under a 72-hour emergency hold.

In July, Ken Winters, a faculty member in the Department of Psychiatry, retired after admitting that he had forged a federal research document. He told KMSP News that the university had allowed him to retire without sanctions.

On February 10, 2016, a consultant hired by the University of Minnesota found over forty critical violations of research and safety policy in the Department of Psychiatry. The consultant also reported being verbally abused and intimidated by faculty members, and said university administrators had instructed her not to put her critical findings in writing.

In April 2016, Rep. Cindy Pugh, Rep. Connie Bernardy, and Rep. Abigail Whelan, members of the Minnesota House of Representative Higher Education Finance and Policy committee, introduced a bill that would have research studies in the Department of Psychiatry monitored by the Ombudsman for Mental Health and Developmental Disabilities. Brian Herman, vice-president for Research at the University of Minnesota, testified against the bill on April 13, 2016. The bill is currently still under consideration.

== Legacy ==
After the Markingson case, legislators, attorneys and bioethicists have questioned whether it is ethically acceptable to recruit seriously mentally ill patients into research studies while they are under involuntary commitment orders, pointing out that most studies could be done with subjects who are less vulnerable. Involuntarily committed patients are often confined to locked psychiatric units under the care of authorities who control their potential release. Many are also suffering from conditions that impair their capacity to think clearly and make good judgments about their health. These circumstances can compromise the ability of such patients to give true informed consent.

The Markingson case also raised questions about whether it is ethically acceptable for physicians to recruit their own patients into research studies they are conducting. The Ombudsman for Mental Health and Mental Retardation noted that "it is very difficult for people to say no when they rely on someone for ongoing medical care." Legislation passed in the aftermath of the Markingson case placed significant restrictions on psychiatrists recruiting their own patients into drug studies.

Some commentators have cited the Markingson case as an example of the way that improper financial incentives and financial conflicts of interest can endanger the welfare of patients. Both Olson and Schulz worked as paid speakers and consultants for the pharmaceutical industry, and the chair of the Institutional Review Board panel overseeing the CAFÉ study had received speaking and consulting fees from AstraZeneca, the study sponsor, raising questions about their judgment and impartiality.

In addition, as the Legislative Auditor pointed out, AstraZeneca prorated its payments to the University of Minnesota based on the number of subjects enrolled and how long they remained in the study, creating "an incentive to enroll and keep subjects enrolled in the CAFÉ study." The Legislative Auditor went on to note that "Olson kept Markingson in the study despite Mary Weiss' repeated warnings that Dan was not well and the study medication was not working."

Some experts cite the CAFÉ study as an example of a pharmaceutical company designing a research study in a way that produces positive results to be used for marketing purposes, rather than answering a legitimate scientific question. David Healy, a professor of psychiatry at Bangor University in Wales, has said that the CAFÉ study was an "entirely marketing-driven exercise." It is widely seen as unethical to enroll subjects in research studies that are not well-designed or scientifically valid.

Critics also assert that the Markingson case raises questions about the responsibility of institutional leaders to investigate credible evidence of the mistreatment of research subjects and take steps to remedy the problems. Many scholars contend that unethical behavior in organizations persists when employees fear retaliation for reporting such behavior. The University of Minnesota's Department of Psychiatry had a significant history of research misconduct that preceded the Markingson case, yet university leaders dismissed criticism from university employees, refused to conduct a legitimate investigation when Markingson died by suicide and repeatedly made misleading statements to deflect public attention from the case. Leaders from many industries apart from health care emphasize that a culture of safety cannot exist without public transparency and a spirit of trust among employees.

Finally, the Markingson case adds to a larger debate about the safety of medical research and the adequacy of the current oversight system. It is one of a number of high-profile studies in recent decades in which research subjects have died or been seriously injured, including the TGN1412 study by PAREXEL in London; the Abduhalli v. Pfizer case in Kano, Nigeria: the BIA 10-2474 study in Rennes, France; the suicide of Traci Johnson in a duloxetine study at the laboratories of Eli Lilly and Company; the death of Ellen Roche at the Johns Hopkins School of Medicine; the death of Nicole Wan at the University of Rochester Medical Center; the death of Walter Jorden at a CRI Worldwide facility (now part of PRA Health Sciences) in New Jersey, and the death of Jesse Gelsinger at the University of Pennsylvania.

Some critics fault poor oversight by the Food and Drug Administration. When journalist Peter Aldhous compared Food and Drug Administration records with disciplinary actions by state medical boards, he found dozens of doctors conducting research studies after they had been sanctioned or stripped of their licenses for substance abuse, fraud, negligence, or mistreatment of their patients. A report by the Office of the Inspector General of the U.S. Department of Health and Human Services found that the FDA inspects less than one percent of research sites, often long after questionable studies have been completed. In 2005, investigative journalists for Bloomberg Markets magazine discovered that the largest drug testing site in North America was located in a converted motel in Miami, where researchers were paying undocumented immigrants to test unapproved drugs. A former FDA investigator told the magazine, "The FDA's backbone has been Jell-O. The folks at the FDA stopped enforcing the rules several years ago."

However, the problem may well extend beyond the FDA to the entire research oversight system, which depends heavily on a network of Institutional Review Boards to protect subjects. Critics argue that Institutional Review Boards are understaffed and under-qualified, that they are excessively bureaucratic, and that they attempt to restrict research outside their mandate and expertise. Many Institutional Review Boards, such as the one at the University of Minnesota, are staffed by colleagues of clinical investigators whose studies are being evaluated, raising concerns about personal conflicts of interest. Others, known as "independent" or "commercial" Institutional Review Boards, are funded by research sponsors themselves, an arrangement that arguably presents a financial conflict of interest. Two separate sting operations have found commercial IRBs willing to approve phony research studies deliberately designed to be risky or fraudulent.

The architecture of the current system of human subject protection in the United States was put into place after public outcry over scandals such as the Tuskegee syphilis experiment. The National Research Act was signed into law in 1974, and the federal regulations regarding oversight of biomedical research (the Common Rule) came into effect in 1981. That system includes little direct monitoring of research, but rather depends on researchers to comply with the regulations and conduct research honestly. But today's medical research enterprise may simply be too large, complex and financially powerful for such a system to be sufficient. Elizabeth Woeckner, president of Citizens for Responsible Care and Research, a non-profit watchdog organization, has said, "These are regulations for a world that doesn't exist anymore." In 2024, Carl Elliott published The Occasional Human Sacrifice: Medical Experimentation and the Price of Saying No, inspired in part by his own experience of bringing attention to the Markingson case.

== See also ==
- Declaration of Helsinki
- Unethical human experimentation in the United States
- Human subject research
- List of medical ethics cases
- Psychiatric survivors movement
