= Adriana Smith pregnancy case =

2025 medical ethics controversy in the US

Adriana Smith with her first child

The pregnancy of Adriana Smith, a woman from Georgia, US, was the focus of a medical ethics controversy in 2025. Following a medical emergency in February 2025, Smith was declared brain dead but continuing fetal cardiac activity was detected. According to the family, the hospital stated that ending Smith's life support would violate Georgia's abortion law. Therefore, at nine weeks gestation, Smith was kept on life support to allow sufficient fetal development for delivery; the family had no choice in the matter.

The case drew national and international media attention to restrictive laws on abortion in the US after the Supreme Court overturned Roe v. Wade in a 2022 ruling. It sparked discussion regarding consent and end-of-life care. On June 13, Smith's child, a son, was born prematurely via an emergency caesarean delivery. Smith was taken off life support four days later, on June 17.

== Background ==
Georgia's abortion law, known as the LIFE Act, restricts abortion once a fetal heartbeat is detected – in practice a six-week abortion ban – with exceptions in cases in which a police report for incest or rape has been filed and, for later abortions, when there are fetal abnormalities or there are life-threatening risks to the mother. Passed in 2019, the law could not be enforced until the 2022 ruling in Dobbs v. Jackson Women's Health Organization, which overturned Roe v. Wade. The state's abortion law most recently drew national media attention during the 2024 presidential race, when Democratic candidate Kamala Harris said the preventable deaths of Georgia women Amber Thurman and Candi Miller were the result of abortion bans in the state and across the country.

== Pregnancy and death ==
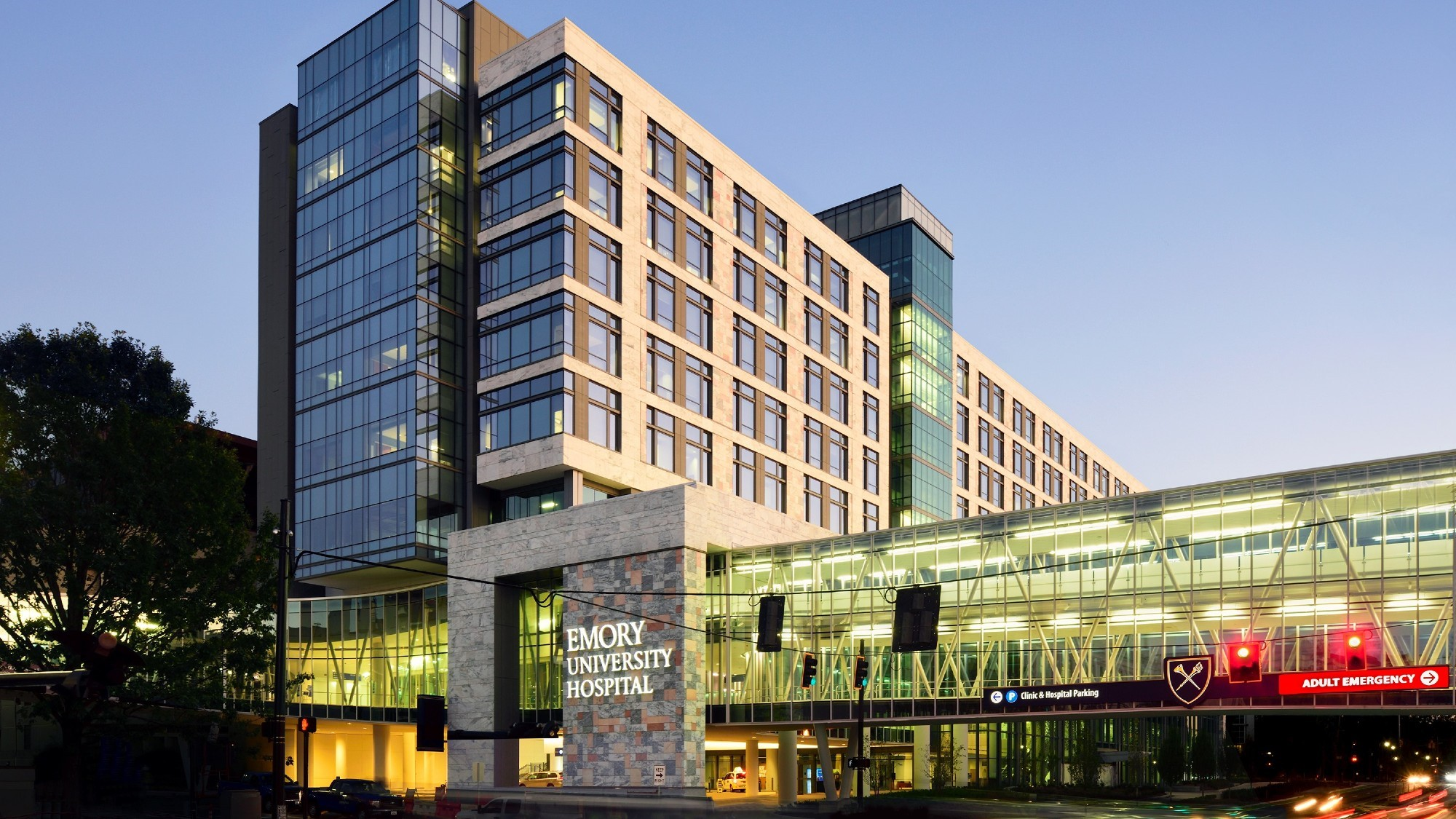
Emory University Hospital, in Atlanta, Georgia, where Smith was declared brain dead and held on life support for months

Adriana Smith, a 30-year-old woman who worked as a nurse and lived in Atlanta, Georgia, was seen at Northside Hospital in February 2025 after experiencing headaches. She was nine weeks pregnant at the time. After Smith was given medication, she was released from the hospital. In the morning, her boyfriend called 911 after he woke up to Smith's gasps for air. After being taken to Emory University Hospital, she was declared brain dead after blood clots were found in her brain.

In mid-May, Smith's mother, April Newkirk, disclosed to local news organizations that Smith's body had been on life support for three months to let the fetus grow enough to be delivered, without giving the family a say in the matter. Newkirk said that she was told that the hospital's decision to keep Smith alive was required under Georgia's anti-abortion law because of the detection of fetal cardiac activity. The situation subsequently attracted the attention of national and international news media, and was further publicized by groups supporting and opposing abortion rights, some of which began to fundraise for the family.

Details on how the fetus was being allowed to develop were not publicized by the hospital. The Atlanta Journal-Constitution reported that life support could have been ended by early August at the earliest, at which point doctors would perform a cesarean section on Smith's body. In May 2025, Newkirk started a GoFundMe online fundraiser for the medical costs with a $250,000 goal. It had raised $105,000 by mid-May, a week after its creation, and $628,000 by November 2026.

On June 15, Smith's family commemorated her 31st birthday at a somber private church service with abortion rights groups. Two days later the family announced the premature birth of a baby son, who weighed 1 pound 13 ounces (0.82 kg), through an emergency cesarean section earlier that week. Since the baby was born at just about six months of gestation, his birth is classified by the World Health Organization as "extremely preterm". Four days later, Smith was taken off life support. A funeral was held later that month.

== Reaction ==
=== Legal and bioethical concerns ===
Democratic state senator Nabilah Islam Parkes wrote to Republican state attorney general Christopher Carr later in May, calling Smith's circumstances "inhumane" and requesting clarity on how the state's abortion law would apply to Smith's case. Carr's office responded: "There is nothing in the LIFE Act that requires medical professionals to keep a woman on life support after brain death. Removing life support is not an action 'with the purpose to terminate a pregnancy." Emory Healthcare did not respond to the legal opinion.

Cole Muzio of the Christian Frontline Policy Council, a conservative Georgia-based organization, agreed with the attorney general's assertion that Georgia's abortion law was not applicable to Smith's case. According to Thaddeus Pope, a bioethicist at the Mitchell Hamline School of Law, Georgia is not one of the handful of states that expressly prohibit halting treatment of incapacitated pregnant women in their laws; as such, continuing treatment would not be legally required and stopping it would not be considered an abortion. University of Virginia bioethicist Lois Shepherd also agreed that continued treatment in this situation is likely not legally required.

Drexel University law professor David S. Cohen noted that the hospital's main concern may be with the legal rights granted to fetuses by the law. Law professor Mary Ziegler of the University of California, Davis, similarly stated that the fetal personhood provision of the state's abortion law may have caused the hospital system to interpret the law as it had in Smith's case.

Rutgers Law School professor Kimberly Mutcherson wrote that the case was "inevitable" due to the nature of laws written by legislators. According to Ziegler, there is a disconnect between "...the attorney general who says, 'No problem, go ahead,' and [...] doctors and their lawyers reading the law and saying, 'We're not so sure", a situation that she said has become more common after Roe v. Wade was overturned in 2022. George Washington University maternal-fetal medicine director Steven Ralston stated that a "long-held framework" in the practice of medicine had been broken by regulations of abortion and reproductive healthcare. Attorney Farah Diaz-Tello of If/When/How, a legal reproductive justice organization, and attorney Jess Pezley of advocacy organization Compassion & Choices both commented on the complications presented by abortion restrictions.

In a press statement, the Republican-controlled House of Representatives asserted that the law "is completely irrelevant" to Smith's case, and that "any implication otherwise is just another gross mischaracterization of the intent of this legislation by liberal media outlets and left-wing activists."

Republican state senator Ed Setzler, a sponsor of the law, stated that he supported the hospital's interpretation of the law.

=== Other reactions ===
The Associated Press reported that Smith, a Black woman, had spurred racial equity concerns from some activists, many of whom are Black women. Monica Simpson, who heads the reproductive justice organization SisterSong and was a lead plaintiff in a lawsuit against the LIFE Act, described Smith's circumstances as problematic. The organization announced it would build an altar, "Trust Black Women", as a memorial to Smith. The organization Students for Life, which opposes abortion rights, announced its intent to fundraise $100,000 to donate to the hospital for the family's care.

In the British newspaper The Independent, journalist Zoë Beaty wrote that Smith's case was "harrowing proof that the US is living in The Handmaid's Tale, urging vigilance in the United Kingdom, where she reported increasing prosecution of illegal abortion.

== Subsequent developments ==
=== Smith's child ===
In an interview two months after the delivery, in August, Smith's mother confirmed that the child was alive and said that he weighed less than 5 pounds (2.3 kg). They hoped that the child would leave the hospital by late September or October. In December, the family confirmed that the baby remained in the hospital. The father, Adrian Harden, was granted legal custody of the child through a lawsuit against Smith's mother, as he and Smith were not married. According to his attorneys, the lawsuit was necessary to avoid the possibility that the child would be placed into foster care.

=== Legislation ===
On June 17, the day Smith was taken off life support, three Democratic House Representatives—Nikema Williams of Georgia, Ayanna Pressley, and Sara Jacobs—announced a resolution that urges states to repeal laws that ban or criminalize abortion, and provide legal clarity to the subject of fetal personhood. The resolution described the case as the "direct result of the Black maternal health crisis."

Democratic state representative Park Cannon called for the passage of "Adriana's Law", which would, in Cannon's words, "affirm that individuals retain agency over their bodies and medical decisions even under restrictive fetal personhood regimes."

== Similar cases ==
The Associated Press reported on past cases similar to Smith's circumstances, which include: a pregnant Texas woman, Marlise Munoz, who in 2014 was kept on life support at a Fort Worth hospital for two months after brain death; and a Florida woman who was declared brain dead 22 weeks into her pregnancy and then had her baby delivered after weeks of care, according to a 2023 article by University of Florida College of Medicine–affiliated physicians. A 2021 review article co-authored by Thomas Jefferson University maternal-fetal medicine director Vincenzo Berghella found 35 past cases of women who were declared brain dead and subsequently had their pregnancies extended; in these 35 cases, doctors could only allow an average of a seven week extension before complications forced their intervention.

== See also ==
- Death of Chaniece Wallace
- Death of Sha-Asia Washington
- Race and maternal health in the United States
- Women's health movement in the United States
