= Death of Tirhas Habtegiris =

American immigrant from Eritrea (1978–2005)

Tirhas Habtegiris (1978 – December 14, 2005) was a United States resident originally from Eritrea, who, after being diagnosed as terminally ill, was removed from a ventilator against the wishes of her family. Habtegiris had a form of cancer known as an abdominal angiosarcoma which had spread to her lungs.

There is debate over whether Habtegiris was conscious and responsive when the respirator was removed. Her family claims that she was conscious and responsive and suffocated over the course of 16 minutes. The hospital claims that she had been unconscious and unresponsive since shortly after her admission, due to the large doses of intravenous narcotics necessary to manage her pain.

Under the Texas Advance Directives Act (or Futile Care Law), a terminally ill patient can be removed, at the hospital's discretion, from life-sustaining treatment that "the attending physician has decided and the review process has affirmed is inappropriate treatment."

A statement from the hospital indicates they offered to hire an immigration attorney to bring the woman's mother to her bedside so that she could die in her mother's arms, but the family said that the process in their home country would take too long.

== See also ==
- Terri Schiavo
- Texas Futile Care Law
