= Susan Torres =

American woman

Susan Michelle Rollin Torres (November 23, 1978 – August 3, 2005) was an American woman known for giving birth to a baby girl while brain dead and on a life support machine.

Torres had a stroke on May 7, 2005, as a consequence of an undiagnosed melanoma (skin cancer). She was taken to the Virginia Hospital Center, where it was determined that the cancer had spread to her brain, and Torres was diagnosed as being brain dead. She was 14 weeks pregnant at the time. Her husband Jason decided that because of their Catholic faith, she would be kept on life support in order to save the baby. A fund was set up to assist with the hospital bills and for the baby's care.

The child, Susan Ann Catherine Torres, was born on August 2, 2005, through a caesarean section and weighed 1 pound, 13 ounces. The mother, Torres, was removed from life support on August 3, 2005, and died the same day. As the baby's birth was premature, the child had an intestinal disorder that required surgery. On September 12, 2005, Susan Ann Catherine Torres died shortly after surgery for a perforated intestine.
