= Giovanni Nuvoli =

Italian football referee

Giovanni Nuvoli (Alghero, 15 December 1953 – Alghero, 23 July 2007) was an Italian football referee who suffered of amyotrophic lateral sclerosis since 2001. With the help of Associazione Luca Coscioni, he fought for his right to die but his attempted euthanasia was blocked by the authorities on 13 February 2007. He started a hunger strike on 16 July 2007 and subsequently died on 23 July. The case sparked controversy in Italy, also because of its similarity to that of Piergiorgio Welby.
