= Baby M (Australia) =

Australian girl who was born with severe birth defects

Baby M (14 July 1989 – 26 July 1989) was the pseudonym of an Australian girl named Allison who was born with severe birth defects, whose treatment and eventual death caused significant controversy and international discussion about the medical ethics of disabled newborns. Right to Life activists accused her parents and the hospital of murdering the infant, leading to a lengthy legal inquest.

== Baby M ==
In July 1989, Allison was born at Royal Children's Hospital in Melbourne with severe birth defects. She had an extreme case of spina bifida that left her paralysed below the waist, and she had a brain malformation marked by hydrocephalus that meant she was most likely mentally disabled and would have seizures. Within days she developed severe breathing issues.

Neonatal physician Peter Loughnan informed her parents of their daughter's poor outlook and the low quality of life she would face if she survived. He recommended the parents consider a "conservative treatment, in which Allison would be cuddled, fed and relieved of any pain," with no life-saving measures performed. He consulted with other specialists, including fellow neonatal physician Peter McDougall, who "strongly supported" Loughnan's assessment of the infant. They believed any surgery would be futile.

After consulting two Catholic priests and seeking guidance from relatives, Allison's parents agreed with the doctor's recommendation.

A relative informed the Victorian Right to Life association of the parents' decision to withhold lifesaving treatment upon advice of medical staff. When Allison was seven days old, the activists arrived at Royal Children's Hospital and demanded to see her parents, announcing they wanted to adopt her. When this was unsuccessful, the activists called the police and told them a baby was being drugged and starved to death at the hospital, causing detectives to investigate. After Allison's death at 12 days old, the Right to Life group accused the parents and the doctors of murdering her.

== Inquest and rule of law ==
In addition to media and public attention, the case was particularly unique as the medical practice of withdrawing life-saving treatment from the baby lacked "explicit legal backing" in Australia. In actuality, in a similar 1986 case, Justice Frank Vincent of the Supreme Court of Victoria ordered the same hospital to take "all necessary means" to save a nine-day-old baby boy with spina bifida. During the 1986 case, Justice Vincent ruled that nobody "has any power to determine that the life of any child, however disabled that child may be, will be deliberately taken away from it .... [The law] does not permit any decisions to be made concerning the quality of life, nor does it enable ... any assessment to be made as to the value of any human being." In that case, the grandparents had sought legal means to keep the baby alive, and Justice Vincent made the baby a ward of the court. However, the doctors and hospital did not present their side to the court or provide evidence to explain their recommendation.

In 1991, a hearing into the Baby M case lasted five months. The Deputy Coroner Wendy Wilmoth ruled that Allison had died of natural causes, and chastised the Right to Life group. "The decisions made by her doctors and her parents, and the careful steps taken to ensure these decisions were legally, ethically and morally sound, have been tested and found entirely reasonable and appropriate," Wilmoth stated. The child's parents and the medical staff were exonerated of all wrongdoing.

Television journalist Jill Singer's coverage of the case and inquest, a report entitled, Baby M, was broadcast on The 7.30 Report in 1992. It once again brought the case to the public, which prompted the Victorian Law Reform Commission to introduce new guidelines for doctors and parents in dealing with disabled and sick newborn babies. Singer won the Walkley Award for Best Investigative Report for Baby M.

== Later developments ==
In 2010, Allison's parents gave Loughnan and McDougall permission to speak publicly about the case, which they did at a medical ethics conference, "Tackling Ethical Dilemmas in Intensive Care."

== See also ==
- Baby K
