= June Hartley =

June Hartley (born 1967) is a California woman who faced charges for assisting in the suicide of her brother, Jimmy, after he suffered a series of strokes.

== Death and criminal charges ==
Jimmy Hartley, a blues musician and lead singer for the Studebaker Blues Band, was found dead in his family's home in Lodi, California on December 8, 2008. A helium tank and a copy of an instructional book by Derek Humphry, the chairman of Final Exit Network, were found near his body. He had previously been left paralyzed and lost his speech and hearing after a series of strokes in 2006. Over the next two years, he had repeatedly asked police and others to help him die.

On February 23, 2009, San Joaquin County prosecutors charged June Hartley with assisted suicide, an offense for which she faced six years in prison if convicted. She pleaded not guilty and was freed on bail on February 28, 2009. She later changed her plea to guilty on a lesser charge and received a sentence of probation and community service without jail time.

== Opinion and reaction ==
The case generated a response from both supporters and critics of assisted suicide. Brian Johnston, executive director of the California Pro-Life Council, stated that Hartley's case underscored the need for laws to keep "emotionally vulnerable people" from "taking lethal action" into their own hands. However, Barbara Coombs Lee, the president of Compassion and Choices, defended Hartley. She explained that a case like Hartley's "cries out for humane and rational legislation, but lawmakers are unwilling to embrace it." Assisted suicide advocate Jacob Appel expressed concerns that the case might have significant repercussions. He wrote that "family members and friends of similarly suffering individuals in California...may now shy away from helping their loved ones die if they fear reprisals from overzealous district attorneys."

== See also ==
- Right to die
- Bioethics
