= Abortion in Georgia (U.S. state) =

Abortion in Georgia is illegal after detection of embryonic cardiac-cell activity, which typically begins in the fifth or sixth week after the onset of the last menstrual period (LMP), two to three weeks after implantation. Although this law was ruled unconstitutional by a Georgia superior court judge on September 30, 2024, it remains in effect while the state appeals the ruling.

The 6-week abortion ban came into force on July 20, 2022, almost a month after the U.S. Supreme Court's Dobbs v. Jackson Women's Health Organization, No. 19-1392, 597 U.S. ___ (2022) ruling. In 2007, mandatory ultrasound requirements were passed by state legislators. Georgia has continually sought to legislate against abortion at a state level since 2011. The most recent example, 2019's HB 481, sought to make abortion illegal as soon as embryonic cardiac-cell activity can be detected; in most cases that is around the six-week mark of a pregnancy. An injunction was issued against this bill by a federal judge, who ruled that it contravened the Supreme Court's 1973 ruling. A poll conducted by the Pew Research Center in 2014 found that 49% of Georgians believed abortions should be illegal in all or most cases vs 48% legal in all or most cases. The 2023 American Values Atlas reported that, in their most recent survey, 63% of Georgians said that abortion should be legal in all or most cases.

The number of abortion clinics has been on the decline for many years, going from 82 in 1982 to 55 in 1992 and further falling to 17 in 2014. Due to tight restrictions in neighboring states, as well as cost issues, thousands of women come from out of state to have abortions in Georgia. There were 30,013 legal abortions in 2014, and 31,009 in 2015. 14.5% of all abortions carried out in 2015 were for out of state residents. There is an active abortion rights movement in the state. This received a surge in donations following the passing of the state's controversial 2019 bill. Women from the state participated in marches supporting abortion rights as part of a #StoptheBans movement in May 2019.

Concerns have been raised over preventable deaths due to the Georgia abortion ban. A Georgia maternal mortality review committee concluded in 2024 that the deaths of two pregnant mothers were preventable and that they were unable to receive the appropriate health care due to the state's abortion ban.

Abortions after the fifth or sixth week of pregnancy are decriminalized in the Georgia cities of Atlanta and Savannah.

== History ==
Thousands of women came from out of state in 2015 to get abortions in North Carolina and Georgia. 14.5% of all abortions in Georgia that year were for out-of-state residents, while 7.5% of all abortions performed in North Carolina were performed for out-of-state residents. This contrasted to neighboring South Carolina, where only 5.9% of abortions performed in the state involved out-of-state residents.

Status of the "heartbeat bills", i.e. abortion bans at around 6 weeks, by state (exceptions not marked): Heartbeat bills supplemented or rendered moot by abortion bans at all stages Abortion bans at all stages, but heartbeat bills blocked Other states with abortion bans at all stages, or states without abortion providers Heartbeat bill in force, without total abortion bans Heartbeat law partially passed by state legislature Law passed but blocked or struck down by court order

In the late 1960s and early 1970s, Arkansas, Colorado, Georgia, Maryland, New Mexico, North Carolina and Oregon made reforms to their abortion laws, with most of these states providing more detailed medical guidance on when therapeutic abortions could be performed. In 1962, the American Law Institute published their model penal code as it applied to abortions with three circumstances where they believed a physician could justifiably perform an abortion, "If ... there is substantial risk that the continuance of the pregnancy would gravely impair the physical or mental health of the mother or that the child would be born with grave physical or mental defect, or that the pregnancy resulted from rape, incest, or other felonious intercourse." In 1968, Georgia implemented a version of this but created an exception where they did not allow abortion in the case of incest.

The state passed a law in the 2000s banning abortions at 22 weeks because they alleged that fetuses can feel pain. The state was one of 23 states in 2007 to have a detailed abortion-specific informed consent requirement. Georgia, Michigan, Arkansas and Idaho all required that women must be provided the option by an abortion clinic to view an image of their fetus if an ultrasound is used prior to the abortion taking place. Informed consent materials about fetal pain at 20-weeks in Arkansas, Georgia and Oklahoma say, "the unborn child has the physical structures necessary to experience pain." The Journal of the American Medical Association has concluded that pain sensors do not develop in the fetus until between weeks 23 and 30. Georgia and Wisconsin were two of the only 22 states with written informed consent materials referring women to "crisis pregnancy centers" which acknowledged these centers did not support or provide women with abortion related services.

In 2011, the state was one of six where the legislature introduced a bill that would have banned abortion in almost all cases. It did not pass. This was repeated in 2012, where the state was one of three to unsuccessfully try to ban abortion.

The law as of March 2019 required that women wait 24 hours after their initial appointment for an abortion before they could have a second appointment for the actual procedure. This could be waived in case of medical emergency, allowing a woman to receive mandatory counseling over the phone or via a website. State law at the time prohibited health insurance companies on public exchanges from offering abortion services unless the life of the woman was at risk.

Georgia had an approximately six-week abortion ban slated to go into effect in 2019, which would have made it illegal to obtain an abortion in the state once embryonic cardiac-cell electrical activity could be detected. The law made no exception for cases of rape or incest and mandated a penalty in prison for doctors who perform the procedure, but noted specifically that this was not referring to the women who get this procedure done. Rep. Ed Setzler introduced that law, HB 481, in the Georgia House of Representatives on February 25, 2019. During his campaign for Governor, Brian Kemp, now the governor of Georgia, "vow[ed] to sign the toughest abortion laws in the country" and when asked about litigation, said, "bring it! I'll fight for life at the Capitol and in the courtroom." After being passed in the House on March 7, 2019, HB 481 was passed out of a Senate committee on March 18, 2019. It was subsequently passed by the entire state Senate, after which it was narrowly passed by the House 92–78. The bill was signed by Governor Kemp on May 7, 2019. Georgia was one of several states passing similar bills in April and May 2019, alongside Missouri, Louisiana, and Alabama. Many women do not yet know that they are pregnant at 6 weeks since the woman's last menstrual period.

On June 24, 2022, the Atlanta City Council passed a resolution to decriminalize abortion after the sixth week of pregnancy.

In an audio from a campaign stop in Blakely on October 13, 2022, Governor Brian Kemp said he "liked the idea" of a "statewide ban on the destruction of embryos" regardless of the reason or the health risk to the mother.

Following the overturn of Roe v. Wade in 2022, the United States maternal and infant mortality rate rose for the first time in 20 years. More than 30 states saw at least slight rises in infant mortality rates in 2022, but four had statistically significant increases - Georgia, Iowa, Missouri and Texas.

On March 21, 2025, a 24-year old woman in Tifton, Georgia was arrested after having a miscarriage and disposing of the fetal remains in a dumpster. The charges against her were dropped following nationwide backlash.

In May 2025, it was reported that 30-year old Adriana Smith, who had suffered a medical emergency and become brain-dead when 9 weeks pregnant, was being kept on life support by Emory University Hospital, who cited Georgia's abortion ban as the reason for keeping her on life support.

=== Judicial history ===
The US Supreme Court's decision in 1973's Roe v. Wade ruling meant the state could no longer regulate abortion in the first trimester. However, the Supreme Court overturned Roe v. Wade in Dobbs v. Jackson Women's Health Organization, No. 19-1392, 597 U.S. ___ (2022) later in 2022. In 1973, the US Supreme Court also ruled in a case named Doe v. Bolton. The 7–2 ruling invalidated the law in Georgia that said a woman needed to seek and attain permission from three physicians before she could have an abortion performed on her. The Court said Georgia's law put too many restrictions on women seeking to get abortions, making it unconstitutional.

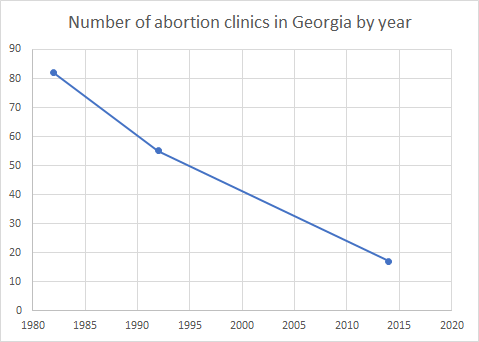
Number of abortion clinics in Georgia by year

After HB 481 was passed in May 2019, the American Civil Liberties Union, Planned Parenthood, and the Center for Reproductive Rights sued the state and sought an injunction against enforcement of the ban before it would go into effect in January 2020. The case was heard in the United States District Court for the Northern District of Georgia under Judge Steve C. Jones. Jones ruled in favor of the injunction to block enforcement in his decision in October 2019, stating "By banning pre-viability abortions, H.B. 481 violates the constitutional right to privacy, which, in turn, inflicts per se irreparable harm on Plaintiffs."

The Georgia Supreme Court on November 23, 2022, reinstated the state's ban on abortions after approximately 6 weeks of gestation (3 weeks of pregnancy). The limit is when embryonic cardiac-cell activity is detected via ultrasound. On October 24, 2023, considering a challenge to the ban, the Georgia Supreme Court upheld the ban and sent the case back to Fulton County Superior Court, which on September 30, 2024 ruled the ban unconstitutional and permanently enjoined it. Fulton Superior Judge Robert McBurney struck down the law and ruled that it violated the state constitution. However, on October 7, the Georgia Supreme Court reinstated the ban, effective immediately, while the court considered an appeal.

== Statistics ==
In the period between 1972 and 1974, the state had an illegal abortion mortality rate per million women aged 15–44 of between 0.1 and 0.9. In 1990, 796,000 women in the state faced the risk of an unintended pregnancy. In 2010, the state had eight publicly funded abortions, of which all eight were federally funded. In 2014, 49% of adults said in a poll by the Pew Research Center that abortion should be illegal in all or most cases with 48% believing it should be legal.

According to a 2020 study, the 22-week law reduced the number of abortions after 21 weeks.

Number of reported abortions, abortion rate and percentage change in rate by geographic region and state in 1992, 1995 and 1996
| Census division and state | Number | | | Rate | | | % change 1992–1996 |
|---|---|---|---|---|---|---|---|
| Census division and state | 1992 | 1995 | 1996 | 1992 | 1995 | 1996 | % change 1992–1996 |
| South Atlantic | 269,200 | 261,990 | 263,600 | 25.9 | 24.6 | 24.7 | –5 |
| Delaware | 5,730 | 5,790 | 4,090 | 35.2 | 34.4 | 24.1 | –32 |
| District of Columbia | 21,320 | 21,090 | 20,790 | 138.4 | 151.7 | 154.5 | 12 |
| Florida | 84,680 | 87,500 | 94,050 | 30 | 30 | 32 | 7 |
| Georgia | 39,680 | 36,940 | 37,320 | 24 | 21.2 | 21.1 | –12 |
| Maryland | 31,260 | 30,520 | 31,310 | 26.4 | 25.6 | 26.3 | 0 |
| North Carolina | 36,180 | 34,600 | 33,550 | 22.4 | 21 | 20.2 | –10 |
| South Carolina | 12,190 | 11,020 | 9,940 | 14.2 | 12.9 | 11.6 | –19 |
| Virginia | 35,020 | 31,480 | 29,940 | 22.7 | 20 | 18.9 | –16 |
| West Virginia | 3,140 | 3,050 | 2,610 | 7.7 | 7.6 | 6.6 | –14 |

Number, rate, and ratio of reported abortions, by reporting area of residence and occurrence and by percentage of abortions obtained by out-of-state residents, US CDC estimates
| Location | Residence | | | Occurrence | | | % obtained by out-of-state residents | Year | Ref |
|---|---|---|---|---|---|---|---|---|---|
| Location | No. | Rate^ | Ratio^^ | No. | Rate^ | Ratio^^ | % obtained by out-of-state residents | Year | Ref |
| Georgia | | | | 39,680 | 24 | | | 1992 | |
| Georgia | | | | 36,940 | 21.2 | | | 1995 | |
| Georgia | | | | 37,320 | 21.1 | | | 1996 | |
| Georgia | 26,563 | 12.6 | 203 | 30,013 | 14.3 | 229 | 12.3 | 2014 | |
| Georgia | 26,835 | 12.7 | 204 | 31,009 | 14.6 | 236 | 14.5 | 2015 | |
| Georgia | 29,631 | 13.9 | 228 | 33,811 | 15.9 | 260 | 13.4 | 2016 | |
^number of abortions per 1,000 women aged 15–44; ^^number of abortions per 1,000 live births

== Exceptions to previous 6-week ban ==
Exceptions to the previous 6-week abortion ban were only allowed in cases of immediate risk to the life of the pregnant individual. However, doctors delayed or denied care due to the vague nature of the medical exceptions in the ban.

== Post-Dobbs pregnancy related deaths ==
On August 19, 2022, 28-year old Amber Thurman of suburban Atlanta died of septic shock due to complications from a chemical abortion. The hospital waited too long to provide a dilation and curettage (D&C). A maternal mortality review committee concluded that Thurman's death was preventable. In Georgia, a D&C abortion is a felony, unless it is performed under certain circumstances, and a doctor can face up to 10 years in jail for performing it. While the Georgia law HB481 does not specifically name D&C procedures as illegal, it generalizes to include procedures that stop the heartbeat of a fetus.

In September 2024, the story garnered significant political attention in October 2024 as part of the U.S. Presidential election race, most notably following comments by the Republican presidential candidate Donald Trump and a subsequent speech by Democratic presidential candidate Kamala Harris at a political rally in Georgia. Dr. Christina Francis, an OB-GYN physician, wrote in the Atlanta Journal Constitution an opinion editorial that "Georgia's pro-life heartbeat act was not responsible for Thurman's death. That is because the law allows physicians to intervene in cases of medical emergencies or if the preborn child has no detectable heartbeat. Both of these clearly applied in Thurman's case. Furthermore, a D&C to remove the remains of an unborn child that has died is not an abortion and is not criminalized in Georgia."

On November 12, 2022, 41-year old Candi Miller of Atlanta died due to a lethal combination of painkillers in her system after performing a self-managed abortion at home. Her family stated that she did not seek any medical attention throughout her pregnancy due to fear of jail time under Georgia's abortion ban. A maternal mortality review committee concluded that her death was preventable.

In 2022, the United States maternal and infant mortality rate rose for the first time in 20 years. More than 30 states saw at least slight rises in infant mortality rates in 2022, but four had statistically significant increases: Georgia, Iowa, Missouri and Texas.

== Pro-Abortion Rights Views and Activities ==
Following the leak of the overturning of Roe v. Wade on May 2, 2022, in Georgia there were protests in Athens, Atlanta, and Savannah. On May 21, a protest occurred in Augusta. When Roe v. Wade was overturned on June 24, 2022, hundreds of pro-abortion rights protestors gathered in Atlanta. A group of pro-abortion rights protestors stayed on the Georgia State Capitol steps for over a week following the protests.

In Atlanta, Georgia in October 2023, pro-abortion rights protesters marched in the Atlanta Pride Parade and the Little Five Points Halloween Parade.

In Atlanta, Georgia on September 21 and September 28, 2024, rallies and vigils for Amber Thurman and Candi Miller were held outside of the Georgia Supreme Court and the Georgia Capitol Building, to demand the repeal of Georgia's 6-week abortion ban and the legalization of abortion nationwide.

== Anti-Abortion Views and Activities ==
=== Protests ===
After the release of the Supreme Court draft opinion that would overturn Roe v. Wade, anti-abortion activists rallied in Atlanta.

=== Violence ===
Eric Robert Rudolph was convicted for the 1996 Centennial Olympic Park bombing, the 1997 bombing of an abortion clinic in suburban Atlanta and the 1998 bombing of an abortion clinic in Birmingham, Alabama that killed an off duty police officer. He was found guilty of the crimes and received two life sentences as a result.
