= Spiro Nikolouzos case =

American medical ethics case

Spiro Nikolouzos (1936 – May 30, 2005) was a Texas man incapacitated from bleeding related to a cerebral shunt, whose care was the subject of an appeal of the Texas Futile Care Law.

Nikolouzos was hospitalized on February 10, 2005, at St. Luke's Episcopal Hospital, Houston, Texas, and was in a persistent vegetative state. He was fed through a gastric feeding tube and respirated by a ventilator. The hospital wished to discontinue life support, allowing Nikolouzos to die. His family opposed this action and claimed the hospital's decision was related to the fact that Nikolouzos's Medicare funding was running out, a contention denied by the hospital.

Under the 1999 Advance Directives Act (also known as the Texas Futile Care Law), the hospital may override the family's wishes in such a matter should an ethics committee clear such an action. However, Nikolouzos's family won an emergency injunction preventing the removal of the life support apparatus, and on March 21, 2005, Spiro Nikolouzos was removed to Avalon Place Nursing Home in San Antonio, Texas. Avalon Place had rejected his application nine days earlier.

Nikolouzos subsequently died at Avalon on May 30, 2005.

The precedent set by the case of Sun Hudson may have helped to expedite the removal of Nikolouzos from artificial respiration prior to the move.

== See also ==
- Advance Directives Act
- Futile care law

== Sources ==
- Houston Chronicle article detailing Mr. Nikolouzos's move to Avalon Place
- MSNBC article providing background information on Mr. Nikolouzos's condition and his family's emergency injunction
- First Houston Chronicle article detailing Mr. Nikolouzos's family's injunction and the precedent of Sun Hudson
- Second Houston Chronicle article detailing Mr. Nikolouzos's family's injunction and the precedent of Sun Hudson
