= Jahi McMath case =

US legal case involving brain death

Winkfield v. Children's Hospital Oakland et al
- Court: United States District Court for the Northern District of California
- Full case name: Latasha Winkfield, an individual parent and guardian of Jahi McMath, a minor vs Children's Hospital Oakland, Dr David Durand M.D. and DOES 1 through 10, inclusive
- Citation: Docket report

Case history
- Prior history: Alameda County Case No. RP-13-707598

Holding
- Settlement conference rendered mutually accepted agreement, motion denied as moot, VACATED

Case opinions
- Per curiam

Jahi McMath was a thirteen-year-old girl who was declared brain dead in California following surgery in 2013. This led to a bioethical debate engendered by her family's rejection of the medicolegal findings of death in the case, and their efforts to maintain her body using mechanical ventilation and other measures. Her parents considered these measures to constitute life support, while her doctors considered this to be futile treatment of a deceased person. In October 2014, the McMath family attorney made the unprecedented request that Jahi McMath's brain death declaration be overturned. The attorney later withdrew this request, saying he wanted time for the court-appointed medical expert and his own medical experts to confer. In March 2015, McMath's family filed a malpractice lawsuit against Children's Hospital Oakland and against the surgeon who performed McMath's surgery, indicating they were prepared to argue as part of the lawsuit that McMath was not dead, but profoundly disabled. The family lawyer stated that a preliminary second death certificate was issued on June 22, 2018, listing extensive bleeding relating to liver failure as the cause of death.

== Background ==
According to court documents, McMath was admitted to Children's Hospital Oakland on December 9, 2013, for an adenotonsillectomy, uvulopalatopharyngoplasty and submucous resection of bilateral inferior turbinates. It was hoped these procedures would provide improved airflow during her sleep at night. The hospital described these procedures as complicated. The family described the surgery as a routine tonsillectomy in media reports.

After the surgeries were performed, McMath was conscious and according to her mother, Latasha "Nailah" Winkfield, asked for a popsicle while in the recovery room. On December 9, 2013, McMath suffered massive blood loss and consequent cardiac arrest. According to McMath's doctors at Children's Hospital Oakland, the loss of blood circulation caused whole brain death. On December 12, 2013, her doctors declared her brain-dead. Her family was informed that she was legally dead, and that as a result, life support systems would be discontinued. Her family refused to accept the medical declaration of death by neurological criteria, said that McMath was not dead, and initiated legal proceedings in an effort to require the hospital to continue treatment.

== Legal action ==
On December 20, 2013, McMath's family filed a lawsuit in Alameda County Superior Court, petitioning the court to require Children's Hospital Oakland to keep McMath on life support. In a pretrial conference on December 23, Judge Evelio Grillo appointed Paul Graham Fisher, the chief of Child Neurology at Stanford University School of Medicine, to provide an independent medical opinion regarding the declaration of brain death. McMath's family also requested to have Paul A. Byrne conduct a separate evaluation. Byrne, a neonatologist, has campaigned against the medical consensus of accepting brain death as death. The court denied that request.

Fisher examined McMath and affirmed the diagnosis of brain death, reporting that she had no activity on an electroencephalogram, no blood flow to the brain and did not breathe when removed from mechanical ventilation, all of which are standard clinical indications of total brain death.

On December 24, 2013, Judge Grillo ruled that McMath was legally dead, basing his decision on the medical evidence presented by physicians from Children's Hospital Oakland and from independent expert Paul Fisher, but ruled to require the hospital to continue mechanical ventilation until December 30, 2013, later extending this order until January 7, 2014. Grillo told the family, "This has been very, very hard on you. No one anywhere would wish this to happen to anyone."

On December 30, 2013, the family appealed the decision to the Second District, California Courts of Appeal and the United States District Court for the Northern District of California, calling for the hospital to continue life support measures until other arrangements could be made by the family for the girl's care. McMath's mother argued that applying the Uniform Determination of Death Act to the case was a violation of constitutional religious and privacy rights and that because Jahi's heart was still beating, she was still alive. Byrne stated in court documents that he witnessed McMath moving in the hospital and that he considered her to be alive. The hospital stated that it would be unethical and "grotesque" to require the hospital and its doctors to provide further medical care to a dead body and said that Byrne was "a crusader with an ideology-based bias". The hospital also said that Lazarus signs are not uncommon in cases of brain death. After the hospital and McMath's family engaged in settlement talks, an agreement was facilitated in which McMath could be released from Children's Hospital, with the ventilator and her intravenous fluid lines, to the custody of her mother, but the United States District Court for the Northern District of California denied the family's petition to require hospital staff to perform a tracheostomy and insert a feeding tube.

== Transfer ==
On January 5, 2014, Children's Hospital released McMath to the Alameda County coroner. The coroner's office had issued an official death certificate for McMath on January 3, 2014, with the date of death listed as December 12, 2013. The death certificate was incomplete, pending an autopsy to determine cause of death. After receiving custody of McMath from Children's Hospital, the Coroner then released her to the custody of her mother, who was warned of and assumed all risk regarding cardiac arrest during the transfer. The family moved the girl to an undisclosed location where a tracheostomy was performed and a feeding tube was inserted.

== Commentary ==
This case has prompted some commentators to discuss the futility of life support in such cases and even refer to it as "death support". Other questions that have been raised include how California law treats brain death and whether McMath's case could change existing laws and practices. McMath's attorney, Christopher Dolan, said, "There would have been no legal battle if Jahi had had her tonsils out in New Jersey", referring to a New Jersey state law allowing religious objection to a declaration of death on the basis of neurological criteria. Public confusion surrounding differences between brain death and cardiac death raised by this case led some doctors to voice concern about how the case could affect live organ recovery from brain dead patients. The impact of this case on medical negligence awards in California has also been discussed, as there is no compensation limit if the patient is alive, while compensation is capped at $250,000 if the patient has died.

== Aftermath ==
In March 2014, the Terri Schiavo Life and Hope Network awarded McMath's family an annual award. The award recognizes "the unconditional love they have for Jahi, and their courage as they continue the fight for their daughter against overwhelming odds." McMath's mother stated she was honored to receive the award and referred to her daughter as "still asleep," clarifying that she does not use the phrase "brain dead" to refer to her daughter.

According to media reports, McMath was at a Catholic hospital in New Jersey until August 2014, after which she was moved to a New Jersey apartment.

In October 2014, McMath's attorney, Christopher Dolan, held a press conference where he said that recent medical tests had detected blood flow and electrical activity in McMath's brain and where he released videos which he said showed the girl moving on command. At that time, Dolan also filed documents asking that the Alameda County Superior Court reverse their finding of brain death in the case. Paul Fisher, M.D., the court-appointed independent expert who had confirmed McMath's diagnosis of brain death in December 2013, said that the new evidence presented did not refute his earlier determination of brain death. Dolan then withdrew the petition for the October 2014 court hearing and requested that the involved doctors collaborate, stating that "with an open and transparent dialogue between health care professionals, only one conclusion can remain: that Jahi McMath is not brain dead."

In March 2015, McMath's family filed a malpractice lawsuit against Children's Hospital Oakland and Frederick Rosen, the surgeon who performed McMath's surgery. The lawsuit alleges that the surgeon noted an abnormal artery in McMath's throat but did not notify the nurses that this placed the girl at increased risk for serious hemorrhaging. Additionally, the lawsuit alleges that McMath bled from approximately 7:30 p.m. to 12:35 a.m., that a doctor said "[expletive], her heart stopped" when he arrived hours after the family said they requested a doctor, and that the family was given conflicting information from nurses regarding how to care for McMath's bleeding. The family also claims that the hospital pressured them to donate McMath's organs.

McMath's family and Bruce Brusavich, the family's malpractice attorney, have indicated that they are prepared to argue that McMath is not brain dead, so that the California state limit of $250,000 on medical malpractice lawsuits involving children who die does not apply in her case.

After viewing over four dozen independent videos of McMath, Alan Shewmon, a UCLA pediatric neurologist, declared her technically alive in a June 29, 2017, court filing, stating that the girl follows movement commands and exhibits other proof of life. Children's Hospital Oakland maintained that the original diagnosis of brain death was correct and that the videos do not meet the diagnostic criteria for brain death.

Dolan issued a statement in June 2018 that McMath had died on June 22, 2018. She was having internal bleeding due to kidney and liver failure, so her doctors removed her from life support, allowing her heart to stop.

Dolan stated that he intends to continue his pro bono case to have McMath's California death certificate revoked and her date of death established as June 22, 2018. However, on February 1, 2019, the case to revoke McMath's original death certificate was voluntarily dismissed by the plaintiffs.

== See also ==
- Death of Marlise Muñoz
- Terri Schiavo case
- Karen Ann Quinlan
