= Betancourt v. Trinitas Hospital =

US legal case concerning bioethics

- Court: New Jersey Superior Court, Appellate Division
- Full case name: Jacqueline Betancourt, Plaintiff-Respondent, v. Trinitas Hospital, Defendant-Appellant.
- Decided: August 13, 2010
- Citations: 1 A.3d 823; 415 N.J. Super. 301

Court membership
- Judges sitting: Philip Carchman, Anthony Parrillo, Victor Ashrafi

Case opinions
- Decision by: Per curiam

Betancourt v. Trinitas Hospital, 1 A.3d 823 (2010), is a New Jersey legal case concerning whether a hospital may unilaterally refuse care to a patient on the grounds that it is futile to prolong the person's life because there is little chance that the condition will improve. The issue has become the focal point of the ongoing debate surrounding denial of care among professional bioethicists.

== Background ==
Ruben Betancourt of Elizabeth, New Jersey, was a 73-year-old retired machinist who suffered from anoxic encephalopathy, a form of brain damage, following successful thoracic surgery for a thymus gland tumor at Trinitas Regional Medical Center in 2008. His doctors determined that he was in a persistent vegetative state, removed his dialysis port, and sought to impose a do not resuscitate order on him.

In response to the decision, Betancourt's daughter went to court and sought legal guardianship of her father. The hospital, which is affiliated with the Catholic Church, opposed her petition. In court papers, Trinitas argued, "Mr. Betancourt is dying... and that dying is being prolonged by the treatment rendered." A trial court ruled in favor of Betancourt's daughter by finding that she was unquestionably a loving, appropriate guardian and was also the unanimous choice of her family. The hospital appealed the court's decision.

In contrast, Betancourt's daughter did not accept the diagnosis. "My father would turn his head," she told an interviewer. "One time I was joking, my father started laughing. How can you tell me a person like that is nonresponsive?" When asked if Betancourt was suffering pain, a Trinitas doctor answered, "I know it. I've seen it." An amicus brief filed in the case calls the diagnosis into question, as pain is not consistent with the diagnosis of persistent vegetative state.

Betancourt died in May 2009. On Friday, August 13, the Appellate Division of the Superior Court of New Jersey issued it opinion in Betancourt v. Trinitas. In essence the Court ruled that because Betancourt had died, the issue was now moot. Thus, it supported neither the plaintiff's nor the defendant's positions.

== Law and ethics ==
According to Sam Germana, vice president and general counsel for Trinitas, the hospital's ethics committee met multiple times to evaluate Betancourt's case. "Our doctors usually err on the side of doing anything," he told the press. "It's extremely rare when they say 'enough is enough, we're just keeping organs alive." At the time of the committee meetings, Betancourt's care had directly cost the hospital, by its own estimate, $1.6 million.

The case had become a cause célèbre for both supporters and opponents of the right of patients, and their surrogate decision-makers, to choose whether to discontinue life-sustaining medical treatment. Among those who had taken the hospital's side are the New Jersey Hospital Association, the Medical Society of New Jersey, and the Catholic Healthcare Partnership of New Jersey. The organizations argued that unconscious, elderly, or terminally ill patients do not have an "unfettered" right to choose whether their lives will be sustained. They also argued that hospitals have a duty to conserve their limited resources for all patients.

The family received support from a prominent authority on medical futility, Thaddeus Mason Pope, and the conservative commentator Wesley J. Smith. Smith wrote: "If the hospital won the case, doctors and bioethicists would, in effect, have been given the right to declare that the life of a patient diagnosed in a PVS is futile, and once that principle became well established in law and medical ethics, such ad hoc health care rationing wouldn't end with catastrophically ill people such as this patient."

In explaining its reasoning for dismissing the case as moot, the Court stated:

"Courts normally will not decide issues when a controversy no longer exists, and the disputed issues have become moot…" "A critical factor in the mootness analysis is whether the unusual circumstances of a case make a recurrence of this specific set of facts unlikely. This is the decisive issue here."

The Court opined that it is up to the legislature to handle the issues raised by the case:

"While we dismiss the appeal, we do not see our declination to resolve the issue on this record and in this case to be an end to the debate. The issues presented are profound and universal in application. They warrant thoughtful study and debate not in the context of overheated rhetoric in the battlefield of active litigation, such as marked the Schiavo debate, but in thoughtful consideration by the Legislature well as Executive agencies and Commissions charged with developing the policies that impact on the lives of all."

== See also ==
- Bioethics
- Karen Ann Quinlan case
