= Death of Marlise Muñoz =

2013–2014 US medical ethics controversy

Marlise Nicole Muñoz (August 20, 1980 – January 26, 2014) was an American woman at the center of a medical ethics controversy between November 2013 and January 2014. She suffered a suspected pulmonary embolism and was declared brain dead. Because she was pregnant, doctors at a Texas hospital kept her body on a ventilator in the intensive care unit despite the determination of brain death. Muñoz's husband entered a legal battle to have her removed from organ support. A Texas law restricts the application of advance directives in pregnant patients, but Muñoz's husband argued that the law was not applicable because his wife was legally dead. A judge ordered the hospital to remove organ support and her cardiac functions stopped on January 26, 2014.

== Background ==
On November 26, Erick Muñoz found his 33-year-old wife unconscious in their family home and rushed her to John Peter Smith Hospital. The cause of her condition was speculated to be a pulmonary embolism. At the hospital it was also established that she was 14 weeks pregnant. According to the hospital's lawyers, Marlise had been brain dead since November 28. In Texas, a person who is brain dead is considered legally dead.

Marlise, a paramedic like her husband, had previously told him that in case of brain death, she would not want to be kept alive artificially. With the court case ongoing and the fetus at 22 weeks, the Muñoz family publicly shared medical information about the fetus: it was severely deformed and ill, as it was gestating in a dead body.

== Legal battle ==
Erick Muñoz petitioned for Marlise to be removed from all life-sustaining measures once brain death had been declared. The hospital refused, citing a Texas law which required that lifesaving measures be maintained if a female patient was pregnant—even if there was written documentation that this was against the wishes of the patient or the next of kin. Erick Muñoz filed suit in state court.

In January 2014, Erick Muñoz's attorneys argued that the fetus had severe abnormalities caused by oxygen deprivation, and was likely non-viable. The fetus had fluid building up inside the skull (hydrocephalus) and possibly had a heart problem. The attorneys also argued that the fetus' lower extremities were deformed to the extent that the sex could not be determined. An attorney who had helped rewrite the Texas state law cited as the reasoning for maintaining life support said that there was a problem with the application of the law to a patient that was no longer alive.

On January 24, 2014, Judge R. H. Wallace Jr. ruled that the hospital must disconnect Muñoz's organ support by January 27. The judge did not rule on the constitutionality of the state law but instead found that the law did not apply to deceased patients like Muñoz.

Numerous states have adopted laws restricting the ability of doctors to end artificial life support for terminally ill pregnant patients. Twelve of those states (including Texas) have the most restrictive of such laws, which automatically invalidate a woman's advance directive if she is pregnant. Such laws state that, regardless of the progression of the pregnancy, a woman must remain on life-sustaining treatment until she gives birth.

Marlise Muñoz was disconnected from organ support at 11:30 a.m. on January 26, 2014. All remaining respiratory function ceased immediately and all cardiac function ended a few minutes later. Her body was released to her family. Erick Muñoz decided to name the fetus Nicole, his wife's middle name.

== See also ==
- John Peter Smith Hospital
- Death of Savita Halappanavar
- Jahi McMath case
- Adriana Smith pregnancy case – A similar case in which a brain-dead woman was kept on life support as a result of her pregnancy and state laws.
- Maternal somatic support after brain death
