= Cuthbertson v Rasouli =

Cuthbertson v Rasouli, 2013 SCC 53, [2013] 3 SCR 341 is a 2013 Canadian medical ethics case concerning whether a hospital may withdraw life-sustaining treatments perceived to be futile without the consent of the patient's representative.

Hassan Rasouli was an Ontario man who underwent a minor brain surgery for a benign tumor in October 2010, and was rendered comatose by a bacterial meningitis infection a few days later. His attending physicians, Dr. Brian Cuthbertson and Dr. Gordon Rubenfeld, felt that Rasouli's diagnosis of PVS offered effectively no chance of meaningful recovery, and planned to withdraw life support. Dr. Parichehr Salasel, Rasouli's wife and legal guardian, argued that end-of-life support should not be disconnected from her husband both for religious reasons and due to her belief that his condition was not as dire as the hospital stated, and obtained a court injunction to prevent the hospital from withdrawing support.

Rasouli's condition showed slight improvement while the case was in progress, resulting in the hospital upgrading his diagnosis to "minimally conscious".

The Supreme Court of Canada issued its decision in October 2013 in favour of Salasel, ruling that consent is required to withdraw treatment.
