= Texas Advance Directives Act =

Texan legislation concerning life-sustaining treatment

The Texas Advance Directives Act (1999), also known as the Texas Futile Care Law, describes certain provisions that are now Chapter 166 of the Texas Health and Safety Code. Controversy over these provisions mainly centers on Section 166.046, Subsection (e),^{1} which allows a health care facility to discontinue life-sustaining treatment ten days after giving written notice if the continuation of life-sustaining treatment is considered futile care by the treating medical team.

Although it is often said that the act is officially named the 'Futile Care Law' or the 'Futile Care Act', the statute has never legally had that title.

== The statute ==
For the hospital personnel to take advantage of legal immunity from prosecution for this the following process must be followed:

- The family must be given written information concerning hospital policy on the ethics consultation process.
- The family must be given 48 hours' notice and be invited to participate in the ethics consultation process. Family members may consult their own medical specialists and legal advisors if they wish.
- The ethics consultation process must provide a written report to the family of the findings of the ethics review process.
- If the ethics consultation process fails to resolve the dispute, the hospital, working with the family, must try to arrange transfer to another provider physician and institution who are willing to give the treatment requested by the family and refused by the current treatment team.
- If after 10 days, no such provider can be found, the hospital and physician may unilaterally withhold or withdraw the therapy that has been determined to be futile.
- The party who disagrees may appeal to the relevant state court and ask the judge to grant an extension of time before treatment is withdrawn. This extension is to be granted only if the judge determines that there is a reasonable likelihood of finding a willing provider of the disputed treatment if more time is granted.
- If either the family does not seek an extension or the judge fails to grant one, futile treatment may be unilaterally withdrawn by the treatment team with immunity from civil or criminal prosecution.^{2}

The bill was signed into law while George W. Bush was Governor of Texas. Critics have compared this law and its effects with Bush's response to Terri Schiavo's situation, in particular his stated intent to sign the proposed Incapacitated Person's Legal Protection Act.^{3}

Similar legislation, modeled on the Texas law, was proposed in Idaho in 2009, but was defeated.

== Cases ==
=== Sun Hudson ===
On March 15, 2005, six-month-old infant Sun Hudson, who had a lethal congenital malformation, was one of the first children to have care withdrawn under the Texas Futile Treatment Law. Doctors demonstrated in the ethics committee reviews that keeping the infant on a respirator would only delay his inevitable death. Sun died shortly after his care was discontinued.

=== Tirhas Habtegiris ===
In December 2005, Tirhas Habtegiris, a young woman and legal immigrant from Eritrea, was removed from a respirator. Habtegiris died from complications of incurable and untreatable cancer that had spread to her lungs. She died 16 minutes after the respirator was removed.

=== Andrea Clark ===
In April 2006, relatives of 53-year-old Andrea Clark were given the 10-day notice under this act. She had reportedly signed a statement she did not wish to die and was cognizant, although having difficulties communicating while under heavy medication and after her brain was damaged by internal bleeding and the effects of heart disease. After publicity from both right and left political groups, St. Luke's hospital in Houston agreed to review the case again, eventually retracting the original decision following this further review. Clark died on May 8, 2006, after an infection.

=== Emilio Lee Gonzales ===
In March 2007, Children's Hospital of Austin gave the mother of 16-month-old Emilio Lee Gonzales the 10 day notice under this act. This child suffered from Leigh's disease, an invariably fatal, progressive illness which eventually destroys all nerve function and thereby prevents breathing, swallowing, coughing, or any intentional or reflex movement. Joshua Carden, an attorney for the Gonzales family, reported that the family had made a "unified decision" to keep the child alive through artificial means, which at the time of the court dispute included constant use of a ventilator machine, pumping food and water into his body, and frequent suctioning fluids out of his lungs, even though the family was aware that the child would not recover.

On March 12, 2007, the hospital ethics committee set a date of March 23 for removing Gonzales from his respirator. Lawyers representing Gonzales' mother Catarina filed for a restraining order on March 20 to allow the family more time to locate another facility willing to accept Gonzales. Later that evening, the hospital agreed to postpone removal of the respirator until April 10. On April 4, lawyers for Catarina Gonzales challenged the constitutionality of the ADA in Federal court, saying that it violated Emilio Gonzales' 1st and 14th Amendment rights. However, on April 6, federal judge Sam Sparks declined to intervene and sent the matter back to state court. As of April 9, over 30 hospitals nationwide had refused to accept Emilio as a transfer patient. On April 10, Travis County Probate Judge Guy Herman issued an emergency restraining order to prevent the hospital from removing Emilio Gonzales from his respirator. A hearing was scheduled for April 19. He died at the hospital from the disease on Saturday, May 19, 2007, at the age of 19 months. He spent a total of five months on a mechanical respirator at the hospital before his death.

=== Other cases ===
Although there is much press about these cases, due to the lack of a reporting clause in the current statute, there is little information on how often these cases occur. Dr. Robert Fine, director of the Office of Clinical Ethics for the Baylor Health Care System says he collected five years' worth of information from eleven large hospitals in Texas and two years' worth of data from five other large hospitals in the state. According to Fine's data, the hospitals surveyed held 2,922 ethics committee consultations, 974 of which concerned medical futility cases. From those 974 consultations, the hospitals issued 65 letters stating agreement with the attending physicians that treatment should be withdrawn, Fine says. But he says the hospitals actually withdrew treatment in only 27 of the cases, while 22 patients died receiving treatment as they awaited transfers.^{4}

== Support ==
Before the act, a hospital could obtain a court injunction to withdraw treatment without giving the family any time to arrange a transfer.

Unlike many previous policies, the act does not take money into an account. A poor person has the same rights under the act as a wealthy person.

Bioethicist and practicing doctor Beverly B. Nuckols has argued: "There are no futile patients... there is only futile medicine and technology. If my patient suffers organ failure after organ failure, some medicines and technology can become harmful – sometimes by causing side effects and more organ failure, often by prolonging the patient's dying."

== Criticism ==
The major criticisms of the act involve the period of time allowed to transfer, and the ability of the ethics committee to make the final decision on whether continued care is considered futile.

The act provides a 10-day period for the patient's family either to find another facility to accept the patient or to obtain a court injunction to extend the time period. If no other facility will accept the patient within the period of time and the family is unable to obtain a court injunction, then the hospital is legally permitted to withdraw life sustaining-treatment from the patient, and to allow the disease to bring about patient's death. Critics maintain that ten days is not enough time to secure alternate care.

== Reform efforts ==
State Senator Bob Deuell (R-Greenville), who is also a practicing family physician, introduced Senate Bill 439. SB 439 is also known as the "Patient and Family Treatment Choice Rights Act of 2007" and would amend the applicable provisions of the Advance Directives Act to "ensure that, when an attending physician is unwilling to respect a patient's advance directive or a patient's or family's decision to choose the treatment necessary to prevent the patient's death, life-sustaining medical treatment will be provided until the patient can be transferred to a health care provider willing to honor the directive or treatment decision." SB 439 was referred to the Senate Health and Human Services Committee on February 21, 2007. A hearing was scheduled for April 12, 2007.

State Representative Bryan Hughes (R-Mineola) introduced an identical bill, HB 1094 with 59 co-sponsors. It was referred to the House Public Health Committee on February 22, 2007.

Media coverage of the Emilio Gonzales case brought debate over SB 439 and HB 1094 to the forefront.

The attempt to change this law did not make it through the 2007 legislative session. It died in the House after the Senate had passed a version of it. Supporters have said they intend to work toward acceptance of changes.

In 2015, the Texas Legislature unanimously passed HB 3074 by State Representative Drew Springer (R-Gainesville), a bill to stop dehydration and starvation of persons with disabilities by reforming the aspect of the statute which allowed healthcare providers to remove artificial nutrition and hydration against a patient's wishes. HB 3074 is the first reform effort to garner universal support from advocacy groups with 4 joint authors and 81 co-authors in the House of Representatives. It was unopposed in the House and Senate and was signed into law by Governor Greg Abbott. It was the first reform to the Texas Advance Directives Act since 2003.

== See also ==
- Spiro Nikolouzos
- Terri Schiavo
- Right to Life
- Right to die
- Culture of life/culture of death
- Futile medical care
- Euthanasia
- Health care reform debate in the United States
- Jacob M. Appel

== Notes ==
- ^1 Chapter 166 of the Texas Health & Safety Code
- ^2 Robert L. Fine, M.D.'s detailings of futile care statutes and processes from Baylor Health System
- ^3 White House Press Briefing 2005-03-21
- ^4 As discussed in "Fine RL. Point: The Texas Advance Directives Act Effectively and Ethically Resolves Disputes About Medical Futility. Chest 2009 136(4):963-7."
