= Sun Hudson case =

The case of Sun Hudson concerned Wanda Hudson and her infant son, who was allowed to die via removal of his breathing tube, contrary to her wishes.

== Chronology ==
Hudson gave birth to a son with an unknown father on September 25, 2004, at St. Luke's Episcopal Hospital in Houston, Texas, with thanatophoric dysplasia, a typically fatal form of congenital dwarfism. She was informed that the infant was most likely unable to survive, and should have his breathing tube removed pursuant to Chapter 166 of the Texas Health & Safety Code, the Advance Directives Act. Under this act, a doctor's recommendations to withdraw medical treatment can be followed, after they have been reviewed by the hospital's ethics committee and after 10 days' notice is given to the patient or guardian. Hudson was given 10 days from written notice to find a new facility to accommodate the infant, but was unable to do so. Texas Children's Hospital states that it attempted to contact 40 facilities without finding a willing one.

Legal delays prevented the removal of the breathing tube, which would have occurred on November 28, 2004, but a judge ruled that the removal of the tube did not require Hudson's agreement. On March 15, 2005, Texas Children's Hospital personnel removed the breathing tube. Official reports state that he was sedated, and asphyxiated in under a minute. Hudson disputes this, and told reporters, who were not permitted entrance, "I wanted y'all to see my son for yourself, so you could see he was actually moving around. He was conscious."

The hospital lacked confidence in Hudson's mental competence; she was quoted by The Dallas Morning News as saying that she didn't seek prenatal care "because I trusted in the Sun", which she claimed fathered the baby. She also made similar comments during an interview with Greta Van Susteren.

== Bioethics implications ==
Bioethicists note that the case is the first time a U.S. hospital has been allowed to remove life sustaining support contrary to the wishes of the legal guardian and lacking advance directives from the patient themselves. This, the bioethicists claim, makes the issue precedent-setting in further cases where it may be applied. Early speculation as to its application was the case of Spiro Nikolouzos. Nikolouzos, however, was accepted at a San Antonio nursing facility on March 21, 2005, where he died of natural causes on May 30.

== Comparisons to the Terri Schiavo case ==
Critics of the federal government's involvement in the Terri Schiavo case, which culminated around the same time as the Sun Hudson case, pointed out that the Advance Directives Act was signed into law by George W. Bush, who was then Governor of Texas. In the Terri Schiavo case, family objections were considered paramount, whereas in the Sun Hudson case, evidence-based medical care was followed instead. However, no extraordinary political measures were taken to save the life of Sun Hudson.

The Houston Chronicle quotes John A. Robertson, the Vinson and Elkins chair at the University of Texas School of Law, as saying the Texas law "allows doctors to stop treatment when ... treating is not going to help at all.... In Florida, the feeding tube will keep Terri alive, so it is not medically futile in that treatment won't work at all."
