= In re Quinlan =

Medical-legal court decision

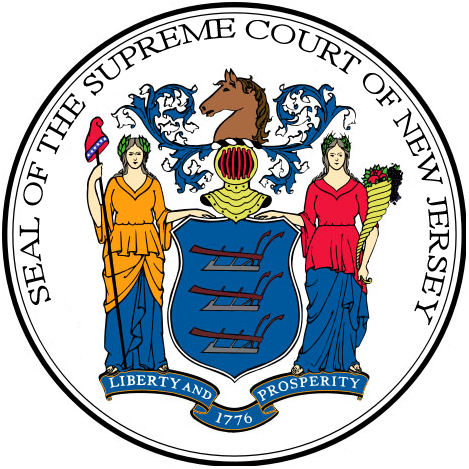
- Court: Supreme Court of New Jersey
- Full case name: In the Matter of Karen Quinlan, An Alleged Incompetent
- Argued: January 26, 1976
- Decided: March 31, 1976
- Citation: 70 N.J. 10, 355 A.2d 647

Case history
- Prior actions: In re Quinlan, 137 N.J.Super. 227, 348 A.2d 801 (1975); certification granted, 69 N.J. 399, 354 A.2d 326 (1975)

Holding
- The guardian of a person in a persistent vegetative state, their family, and attending physicians in consultation with a hospital ethics committee, may withdraw life support if there is no reasonable possibility of the comatose person ever emerging from their condition into a cognitive, sapient state.

Court membership
- Chief Justice: Richard J. Hughes
- Associate Justices: Worral F. Mountain, Mark Sullivan, Morris Pashman, Robert L. Clifford, Sidney M. Schreiber, Milton B. Conford (Note: Milton Conford was a judge from the Appellate Division temporarily appointed to the Supreme Court to fill a vacancy. See Henry v. New Jersey Dep't of Hum. Servs., 204 N.J. 320, 9 A.3d 882 (2010) (Rabner, C.J., concurring))

Case opinions
- Majority: Hughes, joined by unanimous

In re Quinlan (70 N.J. 10, 355 A.2d 647 (NJ 1976)) was a landmark 1975 court case in the United States in which the parents of a woman who was kept alive by artificial means were allowed to order her removal from artificial ventilation.

== Karen Ann Quinlan ==
Karen Ann Quinlan was 21 years old in 1975. After a night of drinking alcohol and ingesting tranquilizers, Quinlan lost consciousness and ceased breathing for two 15-minute periods. After it was determined that she was in a persistent vegetative state, her father, Joseph Quinlan, wished to remove her from the medical ventilator. Quinlan's primary physician and the hospital both refused.

== Legal case ==
Quinlan's father retained attorneys Paul W. Armstrong, a Morris County, New Jersey, legal aid attorney, and James M. Crowley, an associate at the New York City law firm of Shearman & Sterling with degrees in theology and church law, and filed suit in the New Jersey Superior Court in Morris County, on September 12, 1975, to be appointed as Quinlan's legal guardian so that he could act on her behalf. Armstrong would later become involved in the Nancy Cruzan case and eventually become a judge. Crowley was, as of 2017, legal counsel and advisor to several Vatican-related entities. Judge Armstrong is currently a Senior Policy Fellow and Judge in Residence at the Bloustein School of Planning and Public Policy at Rutgers University.

The Court denied his request on November 10, 1975. Joseph Quinlan appealed the decision to the Supreme Court of New Jersey, which on March 31, 1976, held that he could authorize the cessation of ventilation and that Saint Clare's Hospital was bound to proceed with this order.

== Aftermath ==
After being removed from the ventilator, Quinlan continued to breathe until her death, in 1985, from pneumonia.

The autopsy of Quinlan's brain found extensive damage to the bilateral thalamus.

== See also ==
- Betancourt v. Trinitas Hospital, another New Jersey case on end of life care
