= Seales v Attorney-General =

- Court: Wellington High Court
- Decided: 4 June 2015
- Citation: [2015] NZHC 1239
- Transcript: Available here

Court membership
- Judge sitting: Collins J

Keywords
- Euthanasia, Crimes Act 1961, New Zealand Bill of Rights Act 1990

Seales v Attorney-General [2015] NZHC 1239 was a 2015 court case concerned with whether a doctor could assist a terminally ill patient in ending her own life. Wellington lawyer Lecretia Seales, terminally ill from a brain tumour, sought High Court declarations to the effect that her doctor would not be committing murder, manslaughter or assisting a suicide if he assisted in her euthanasia. Seales also sought, as an alternative, that the court make declarations that the Crimes Act was not consistent with the New Zealand Bill of Rights Act 1990. The Court declined to make any of the declarations sought by Seales. Seales died of her illness the day after the judgment was delivered.

== Background ==
In 2011 Seales was diagnosed with a brain tumour. She received brain surgery, chemotherapy and radio therapy but her condition continued to deteriorate. In 2015 she put a case to the High Court to challenge New Zealand law for her right to die with the assistance of her GP, asking for a declaration that her GP would not risk conviction.

The statutory background to the decision is the Crimes Act 1961 and its prohibitions on: homicide (section 160); aiding and abetting suicide (section 179(b)); consenting to death (section 63); and acceleration of death (section 164). In New Zealand these are the legal barriers to euthanasia.

Seales's application relied on giving the word suicide an alternative meaning to the ordinary dictionary definition, as required by section 6 of the New Zealand Bill of Rights Act 1990. Accordingly, during the hearing, "Mr Curran, who appeared with Dr Butler as counsel for Ms Seales, submitted s 63 of the Crimes Act should be construed so as not to preclude consent as a defence to either murder or manslaughter where the deceased has lawfully asserted his or her NZBORA rights."

This legal argument was summarised in a law journal article prior to the hearing;

This alternative meaning would distinguish between the sorts of intentional self-inflicted deaths we ordinarily think of as being “suicide” (the lovesick teen, the family breadwinner facing financial crisis, etc.) and the act of a competent, terminally ill person who is seeking (as in Ms Seales’ case) to choose a more peaceful death when brought to death’s door by the advance of disease and enduring unbearable suffering.

— Kathryn Tucker and Andrew Geddis, Litigating for a more peaceful death

== Declarations sought by Seales ==
Seales sought two declarations regarding criminal law, and two declarations of inconsistency between the Crimes Act and the NZBoRA:

1. Administered aid in dying is not unlawful under section 160 of the Crimes Act in circumstances where the Court is satisfied that the plaintiff is a competent adult who:
  - clearly consents to the administered aid in dying; and
  - has a grievous and terminal illness that causes enduring suffering that is intolerable to her in the circumstances of her illness
2. Facilitated aid in dying is not prohibited by section 179 of the Crimes Act in circumstances where the Court is satisfied that the plaintiff is a competent adult who:
  - Act clearly consents to the facilitated aid in dying; and
  - has a grievous and terminal illness that causes enduring suffering that is intolerable to her in the circumstances of her illness

The declarations of inconsistency that Seales sought were that:

1. Section 160 of the Crimes Act is inconsistent with sections 8 and 9 of the NZBORA, to the extent that administered aid in dying is unlawful under section 160 for a competent adult who:
  - clearly consents to the administered aid in dying; and
  - has a grievous and terminal illness that causes enduring suffering that is intolerable to the individual in the circumstances of his or her illness.
2. Section 179 of the Crimes Act is inconsistent with sections 8 and 9 of the NZBORA, to the extent that it prohibits facilitated aid in dying for a competent adult who:
  - clearly consents to the facilitated aid in dying; and
  - has a grievous and terminal illness that causes enduring suffering that is intolerable to the individual in the circumstances of his or her illness.

These sections in the Crimes Act 1961, as mentioned, set out its prohibitions on homicide (section 160) and aiding and abetting suicide (section 179(b)). These work to effectively block any physician-assisted suicide or act of euthanasia by illegalizing any acts that kill a person, assist in their suicide or accelerate their death. Section 8 of the NZBORA is the right not to be deprived of life, and section 9 contains the right not to be subjected to torture or cruel treatment.

These declarations sought by Seales were to the effect of allowing her to commit physician-assisted suicide. The declarations sought with regards to the New Zealand Bill of Rights Act (NZBoRA) were inspired by the similar Canadian case of Carter v Canada, and the crippling condition that Seales found herself suffering from. Sections 160 and 179 provide a barrier to physician-assisted suicide in New Zealand which closely resembled that of pre-Carter Canada.

Her reasoning was twofold: First, that she was under the constant worry that her inevitable and impending death would be slow, unpleasant, painful or undignified. She saw this as contrary to the way in which she lived her life, and she did not wish to be put through this. Secondly, she worried that this would put her in a position where she felt compelled to take her own life prior to the point that she would desire.

== Judgment ==
Justice Collins set out a number of reasons why he would not grant these declarations, but he also acknowledged a number of things that Seales and her counsel were putting forward that were both accurate and persuasive. It was accepted that a change in the law could lead to a reduction in the number of suicides that take place in New Zealand. New Zealand currently has a very high suicide rate when compared to other developed countries, and taking a step in the direction of legalisation in favour of physician-assisted suicide could potentially help reduce this. This would act twofold, both by giving a more controlled and monitored way of ending a life, but also to reduce the number of people who take their own lives after the realization that they may end up in a position like Seales, with an impending loss of autonomy and dignity.

He explained in the affidavit of Dr Reagan in this case that in his experience the option for aid in dying was beneficial for both patients and families of those suffering. The option of having this process available for someone in a situation where a painful death is inevitable is said to help patients feel like there is a retention of some form of autonomy or control over their lives, while allowing them to live life with their families rather than feeling as though they are forced to take it prematurely so as to avoid possible suffering in the future. This right to autonomy and dignity is one that is fundamental to human rights, and a basic principle of many jurisdictions and has been highlighted as a fundamental right in the European Court of Human Rights.

Despite this, Collins J declined to grant any of the declarations sought.

Although Ms Seales has not obtained the outcomes she sought, she has selflessly provided a forum to clarify important aspects of New Zealand law. The complex legal, philosophical, moral and clinical issues raised by Ms Seales’ proceedings can only be addressed by Parliament passing legislation to amend the effect of the Crimes Act. I appreciate Parliament has shown little desire to engage in these issues. The three private members bills that have attempted to address the broad issues raised by Ms Seales’ proceeding gained little legislative traction. However, the fact that Parliament has not been willing to address the issues raised by Ms Seales’ proceeding does not provide me with a licence to depart from the constitutional role of Judges in New Zealand.

— Collins J, Seales v Attorney-General

Justice Collins noted a potential problem with adopting an alternative meaning of suicide was in giving effect to section 41 of the Crimes Act, which allows force to be used to prevent a suicide; "It is difficult to see how a person who intervenes to prevent a suicide can assess whether or not he or she is intervening in a case of “rational” suicide." Collins also noted the Canadian Supreme Court in Carter v Canada (AG) had given near identical provisions of Canadian criminal law prohibiting euthanasia the same meaning and that there was authority from the United Kingdom endorsing his interpretation of section 179(b) of the Crimes Act.

== Human rights considerations ==
=== Right to life ===
The right to life, or not to be deprived of life, is one of the most fundamental rights as per Blackstone. The differences between the Canadian charter and the NZBoRA begin to show here, as the relevant section of the Canadian Charter, section 7, is broader than section 8 of the NZBoRA. This led to a determination that in the interaction between the Canadian Charter and the Canadian Crimes Act, there was the ability for a competent adult to consent to the termination of their life, so long as they are under the influence of a grievous and irremediable medical condition that causes intolerable and enduring suffering. In New Zealand it was to be discussed in this case, using the aforementioned reasoning, as to whether this precedent was to be accepted.

An argument in favour of physician-assisted suicide based on the right to life may seem counterintuitive, however this argument is based on the proposition that the lack of any euthanasia services available to Seales was actively encouraging her to take her own life while she still had the autonomy and ability to do so. This has its grounding in section 8 of the NZBoRA. Collins J held that as he had come to the conclusion that the Crimes Act was to be interpreted in a way in which consent was no defence to assisting suicide, this had the effect of possibly forcing Seales to take her own life. This acted to engage section 8.

However, when section 8 is engaged it only guarantees that the state will deprive someone of, or interfere with, their life on grounds established by law and that this interference must be consistent with the fundamental principles of justice. These fundamental principles are outlined in Carter v Canada. These are:

- Arbitrariness – Where there is no rational connection between the objective and the law
- Overbreadth – Where the law goes further than necessary, breaching in a way that has no bearing on the objective of the law
- Gross disproportionality – Where the impact of the restriction is highly disproportionate to the purpose of the law

==== Arbitrariness ====
When determining ‘arbitrariness’, Chaoulli v Quebec is instructive. A law can be found to be arbitrary where it bears no relation to, or is inconsistent with, the objective that it pursues. In order not to be found to be arbitrary, the limit on life or liberty requires both a theoretical connection to the purpose of the legislation and a real connection on the facts. Collins J determined that the purpose of the relevant sections of the Crimes Act in New Zealand were created with the purpose to protect all life, it could not be found to be arbitrary, thus Seales' right to life was not found to be limited arbitrarily.

==== Overbreadth ====
When concerning ‘overbreadth’ or whether the legislation was 'overly broad' as Collins J put it, the question is not whether Parliament had chosen the least restrictive means, but rather whether the chosen means infringe life, liberty, or security such that it has no connection with the crime or offence. In Carter, it was held that the prohibition on suicide was overly broad, as the law went beyond what the courts thought that Parliament had intended. Here in Seales, Collins held that he was not able to read section 179 of the Crimes Act in the same way as the Canadian equivalent, and thus there was no overreaching to be found.

==== Gross disproportionality ====
Concerning ‘gross disproportionality’, the issue is whether the legislation goes beyond what would be considered within the norms accepted by the society that the legislation is found within. This was first referred to in R v Malmo-Levine as a fundamental principle of justice. This standard is also set out in Canada v Bedford as one of legislative responses that are so extreme as to be disproportionate to any legitimate government interest. Collins J held that section 179(b) did not meet this standard, as it achieved its 'fair and reasonable' objective of protecting all life.

=== Freedom from torture and cruel treatment ===
The case also considered the right not to be subject to torture or cruel treatment.

It was posed by Seales and her counsel that failing to allow her the ability to end her life was subjecting her to cruel treatment through effectively forcing her to have to live through, what was agreed by a number of professionals, to be quite a painful and debilitating terminal illness. However, previously it had been held in R v Martin (No 3) that section 8 of the NZBoRA cannot be used to affirm the right to be assisted to commit suicide. This previous judgment, coupled with the fact that it had been established by scholars that for a state’s actions to amount to ‘treatment’ there must be some positive action by the state or some exercise of state control over an individual, meant that the argument could not succeed. There was no relevant 'treatment' by the state. An example to help understand this is that of a heroin addict under the effects of drug control legislation. This may cause them pain and suffering due to withdrawals, but they are not considered subject to ‘treatment’ by the state. This is something that the House of Lords, the European Court of Human Rights and the Supreme Court of Canada all also agree upon.

== See also ==
- Lecretia Seales
- New Zealand Bill of Rights Act 1990
- Euthanasia in New Zealand
- Carter v Canada (AG)
- Pretty v United Kingdom
