= Margaret Battin =

Philosopher and medical scientist

- Other name: Peggy Battin M. Pabst Battin
- Citizenship: USA
- Education: Bryn Mawr College 1963, BA University of California, Irvine (1973, MFA 1976, PhD)
- Known for: Assisted suicide research
- Children: Michael Wood Battin Sara Battin Pearson
- Scientific career
- Fields: Philosophy, ethics
- Workplaces: University of Utah
- Thesis: Plato on Truth and Truthlessness in Poetry (1976)

Margaret Pabst Battin, also known as Peggy Battin, is an American philosopher, medical ethicist, author, and an emeritus distinguished professor at the University of Utah. She is a supporter of assisted suicide and has worked extensively on ethical aspects of this issue. In 1993, she was named a Spinoza Chair at the University of Amsterdam for her studies on assisted suicide. Battin is a Hastings Center Fellow. In 2008, Battin's husband, Brooke Hopkins, became quadriplegic after a bicycle accident, which caused her to refine and augment her thinking about assisted suicide; he died in 2013 after he requested to turn off his life support.

== Education and career ==
Battin earned a Bachelor of Arts in philosophy from Bryn Mawr College in 1963. Subsequently, she obtained a MFA in 1973 and a PhD in philosophy in 1976 from the University of California, Irvine. Her master's thesis was titled The Astonishing Possibilities of Love, and her doctoral thesis was titled Plato on Truth and Truthlessness in Poetry.

Battin took a position as visiting assistant professor at the University of Utah in 1975. She was promoted to assistant professor in 1977 and to associate professor in 1988. At Utah, she has been an adjunct professor of internal medicine in the division of medical ethics since 1990, and since 2000, she has held a position of distinguished professor of philosophy.

In 1988 Battin travelled to the Netherlands to study legal euthanasia. For the research she conducted, she was nominated as a candidate for the Spinoza Chair at the University of Amsterdam, a position she then held 1993.

Outside of non-fiction writing, Battin occasionally published fiction pieces including short stories. Fiction allowed her to explore scenarios outside the boundaries of academic philosophy. Her short story, Terminal Procedure, published in The Best American Short Stories 1976, explored ethical issues in research on animals. Robeck, a short story published in Ending Life: Ethics and the way we die (2005), depicted family tensions over what would now be called preemptive suicide in old age. The story was adapted into a stage play called WINTER by playwright Julie Jensen. The play premiered on October 12, 2016, at the Salt Lake Acting Company in Utah. It was also performed in Chicago, Illinois, and Berkeley, California, in 2017.

=== Assisted suicide ===
In 2007, Battin addressed the slippery slope argument used by opponents of assisted suicide. (Note: The slippery slope argument, in this case, is made by opponents of assisted dying who say that relatives of a terminally ill person will coerce them into assisted dying for selfish reasons.) She was the primary author on the study which investigated the demographics of those who used assisted suicide in Oregon and euthanasia in the Netherlands. The study found that the people who used assisted suicide in the US had more "comparative social, economic, educational, professional and other privileges" than those who were considered to be in vulnerable groups. After a bicycle accident in November 2008, Battin's husband Brooke Hopkins became quadriplegic. While caring for him, she became aware of an "opposite, more subtle, kind of coercion — not the influence of a greedy relative or a cost-conscious state that wants [the patient] to die, but pressure from a much-loved spouse or partner who wants [the patient] to live."

In 2011 and 2012, Battin testified in legal cases for two women seeking the right to assisted dying, Canadian woman Gloria Taylor, who suffered from amyotrophic lateral sclerosis (ALS), (Note: Gloria Taylor won her case but died unexpectedly from an infection before she could take control of her own death.) and Irishwoman Marie Fleming, who suffered from multiple sclerosis. (Note: Fleming lost her case, and unsuccessfully appealed to the Irish Supreme Court.) Under cross-examination in Taylor's case, the Canadian government's attorney remarked to Battin that her husband's accident had "presented some pretty profoundly serious challenges to her thinking on the subject.” Battin replied that it had, “but only by provoking the ‘concerted re-re-rethinking’ that any self-respecting philosopher engages in,” and continued with a statement on her continuing commitment to two moral constructs in end-of-life decision-making: autonomy and mercy. "Only where both are operating — that is, where the patient wants to die and dying is the only acceptable way to the patient to avoid pain and suffering — is there a basis for physician-assisted dying... Neither principle is sufficient in and of itself and, in tandem, the two principles operate as safeguards against abuse."

During the 2010s, Battin contacted Allyson Mower, and together with the Marriott Library, Oxford University Press, and a team of librarians, library staff, research assistants, and contractors they created an unprecedented publication format containing a massive compilation of discussion on historical sources of the ethics of suicide. As the project's size approached 1200 pages in 2010, the team developed the idea of publishing a redacted print version with the full version online. Consultations with the publisher and the library led to the publication of a printed text with embedded QR codes linking it to the web version, which itself would have catalog records, links to primary sources, and interactive features. This format combined "long-known benefits of hybrid print/electronic publishing and points to possible future directions in the relationship between publishers and libraries."

=== Applied ethics ===
Battin has worked in many other areas of applied ethics. In her book Ethics in the Sanctuary, Battin developed a method of scrutinizing the practices of organized religion. It focused on practices in different religious groups that raised issues of confidentiality, informed consent, truthtelling, and paternalism in fringe and mainline denominations.

She co-authored an exploration of ethical issues in infectious disease and a study of the ethical issues of drugs from prescription pharmaceuticals; over-the-counter drugs; complementary and alternative medications or herbal drugs; common-use drugs like alcohol, caffeine and nicotine; religious use drugs like peyote and ayahuasca; sports-enhancement drugs; and illegal street, club, and party drugs.

== Personal life ==
During Battin's early adulthood, her mother suffered from liver cancer. She recalled an incident where her mother stumbled and fell after an attempt to get out of her bed, after which her mother asked “Why should it be so hard to die?” Battin cites this as the beginning of her interest in death.

Battin met her second husband Brooke Hopkins at the University of Utah in 1975 when they were both newly appointed to teaching positions, and they bought a house together in 1976. Hopkins had a PhD in English literature from Harvard University and had taught there for five years. Ten years later, in 1986, they married. Battin had a son, Mike, and a daughter, Sara, from her previous marriage.

In 2008, Hopkins suffered a broken neck in a double-bicycle accident and became quadriplegic. (Note: Hopkins was riding his bicycle down a hill in City Creek Canyon in Salt Lake City when he collided with an oncoming bicycle around a blind curve. He landed on his head, and although he was wearing a helmet and had no brain damage, he broke his neck at the top of his spine, suffering a near-complete spinal cord injury at C2/C3.) He spent two years in hospitals and almost 3 years living at home, but he still required 24-hour medical care. (Note: Hopkins had multiple technological supports included a diaphragm pacer, a cardiac pacer, a feeding tube, supplemental oxygen when necessary, and a ventilator. He had suffered no head injury, however, and taught courses in English literature in his home. Hopkins and Battin kept an extensive, medically detailed blog of their experiences, including descriptions of virtually complete paralysis, sometimes severe pain, and functional limitation, as well as accounts of his gratitude for having been rescued and the profound deepening of personal relationships. In July 2013, Hopkins died after his life supports were turned off at his request. Battin subsequently gave a TEDMED [2014] presentation portraying the epidemiological backgrounds and emotional challenges of such a situation.) Battin said of the accident, "[It] has presented me more than an intellectual challenge to the views I've been defending over the years. It is a deeply personal, profoundly self-confronting challenge. Her son Mike said "Not a single part of her world is the same as it was six months ago... It is the most fantastic irony you could imagine." In July 2013, Hopkins died after his life support was turned off at his request.

Battin's situation was one of four case studies used for the book Epistemology, Ethics, and Meaning in Unusually Personal Scholarship. The book explores how four professors have used personal scholarship to find meaning in personal adversity.

== Honors and awards ==
- Gardner Prize. Utah Academy of Sciences, Arts, and Letters, April 2017
- Honorable Mention, PROSE Award (American Publishers Awards for Professional and Scholarly Excellence), Category Philosophy, for The Ethics of Suicide: Historical Sources (Oxford Univ. Press, 2015) . Association of American Publishers, February 2016
- University Professorship. University of Utah, June 2007
- Distinguished Honors Professorship. University of Utah, June 2002
- Rosenblatt Prize. University of Utah, June 2000
- Distinguished Research Award. University of Utah, June 1997
- Spinoza Chair. University of Amsterdam Academic Medical Center, March 1993
- First Prize for Book-length Collection of Short Stories. Utah Arts Council, January 1981
- Fellowship for Independent Study and Research. National Endowment for the Humanities, July 1977

== Major works ==
- Suicide: The Philosophical Issues, Margaret P. Battin and David J. Mayo, St. Martin's, 1980, ISBN 9780720605792
- John Donne, Biathanatos, a modern-spelling critical edition, Michael Rudick and Margaret P. Battin, eds., Garland Publishing Company, 1982 ISBN 9780824094812
- Ethical Issues in Suicide (Prentice-Hall series in the philosophy of medicine), Margaret Pabst Battin, Longman Higher Education, 1982, ISBN 9780132901550
- Suicide and Ethics: A Special Issue of Suicide and Life-Threatening Behavior, Margaret P, Battin, Ronald W. Maris, eds., Human Sciences Press, 1983, ISBN 9780898851670
- Should Medical Care Be Rationed by Age?, Timothy Smeeding, ed., with Margaret P. Battin, Leslie P. Francis, and Bruce M. Landesman Rowman & Littlefield, June 28, 1987 ISBN 9780847675210
- Puzzles about Art: An Aesthetics Casebook, Margaret P. Battin, John Fisher, Ronald Moore, Anita Silvers, St. Martin's, 1989, ISBN 9780312003074
- Ethics in the Sanctuary: Examining the Practices of Organized Religion, Margaret P. Battin, Yale University Press, July 29, 1992, ISBN 9780300052503
- The Least Worst Death: Essays in Bioethics on the End of Life', Margaret Pabst Battin, Oxford University Press, February 17, 1994, ISBN 9780195082654
- Drug use in assisted suicide and euthanasia, M Pabst Battin; Arthur G Lipman, Pharmaceutical Products Press, May 30, 1996, ISBN 9781560248149
- Physician Assisted Suicide: Expanding the Debate, Margaret P. Battin, Rosamond Rhodes, Anita Silvers, Eds., Routledge, August 10, 1998. Hardback ISBN 9780415920025.
- Praying for a Cure: When Medical and Religious Practices Conflict, Peggy DesAutels, Margaret P Battin and Larry May, Rowman & Littlefield, March 25, 1999 ISBN 9780847692637
- The Case for Physician-Assisted Dying: The Right to Excellent End-of-Life Care and Patient Choice, Timothy Quill and Margaret P. Battin, eds., Johns Hopkins University Press, 2004 ISBN 9780801880704
- Ending Life: Ethics and the way we die, Margaret Pabst Battin, Oxford University Press, April 4, 2005, ISBN 9780195140279
- Death, dying, and the ending of life, M Pabst Battin; Leslie Francis; Bruce M Landesman, eds., Ashgate Publishing, ISBN 9780754621744
- Drugs and Justice: Seeking a Consistent, Coherent, Comprehensive View, Margaret P. Battin, Erik Luna, Arthur G. Lipman, Paul M. Gahlinger, Douglas E. Rollins, Jeanette C. Roberts, Troy L. Booher, Oxford University Press, November 30, 2008, ISBN 9780195321012
- The Patient as Victim and Vector: Ethics and Infectious Disease, Margaret P Battin, Leslie P Francis, Jay A Jacobson, Charles B Smith, Oxford University Press, January 29, 2009, ISBN 9780195335835
- Medicine and Social Justice: Essays on the Distribution of Health Care, Rosamond Rhodes, Margaret Battin, Anita Silvers, Oxford University Press, August 29, 2012, ISBN 9780199744206
- The Ethics of Suicide: Historical Sources, Margaret Pabst Battin, Oxford University Press, June 11, 2015, ISBN 9780199385805; Free Digital Archive ethicsofsuicide.lib.utah.edu
- Sex and the Planet: What 'Opt-In' Reproduction Could Do for the Globe, Margaret Pabst Battin, MIT Press, May 28, 2024, ISBN 9780262547987

== See also ==
- Euthanasia and the slippery slope
- Euthanasia
- Suicide
- Applied ethics
- Medical Aid in Dying
- Reproduction
- Long-acting reversible contraceptives
