= Timeline of disability rights in Canada =

This disability rights timeline lists events relating to the civil rights of people with disabilities in Canada, including court decisions, the passage of legislation, activists' actions, significant abuses of people with disabilities, and the founding of various organizations. Although the disability rights movement itself began in the 1960s, advocacy for the rights of people with disabilities started much earlier and continues to the present.

== 1920s ==
- 1928–1972: In 1928, the Legislative Assembly of Alberta enacted the Sexual Sterilization Act. The Act, drafted to protect the gene pool, allowed for sterilization of mentally disabled persons in order to prevent the transmission of undesirable traits to offspring. The Sexual Sterilization Act was repealed in 1972. In 1995, Leilani Muir sued the Province of Alberta for forcing her to be sterilized against her will and without her permission under the Act in 1959, when she was institutionalized at the Provincial Training School for Mental Defectives. Since Muir's case, the Alberta government has apologized for the forced sterilization of over 2,800 people under the Act. Nearly 850 Albertans who were sterilized under the Sexual Sterilization Act were awarded C$142 million in damages.

== 1930s ==
- 1933 – 1973: In 1933, British Columbia legislated the Sexual Sterilization Act, which was repealed in 1973, and which closely resembled the Sexual Sterilization Act of Alberta, although the practices differed. The Sexual Sterilization Act of British Columbia created a Board of Eugenics, consisting of a judge, psychiatrist, and social worker. The Board was granted the authority to order the sterilization, with consent, of any inmate recommended to them by a superintendent, who "if discharged...without being subjected to an operation for sexual sterilization would be likely to produce or bear children who by reason of inheritance would have a tendency to serious mental disease or mental deficiency." Many of the individuals presented for sterilization under the province's eugenics program came through Riverview Hospital (Essondale). "[H]istorian Angus McLaren has estimated that in British Columbia...a few hundred individuals were sterilized".

== 1980s ==
- 1982 – The Canadian Charter of Rights and Freedoms declared physical or mental disability as a prohibited reason for discrimination; this was the first time that such a right was guaranteed in the Constitution of a country. Section 15 of the Charter makes it illegal for any governments in Canada to discriminate against persons with disabilities in their laws and programs.
- 1985 – The Canadian Human Rights Act was enacted, and it banned discrimination against people due to their physical or mental disability. Furthermore, the Act requires federally regulated employers to prevent discrimination and to provide access and support to individuals with disabilities.
- 1986 – E (Mrs) v Eve, [1986] 2 S.C.R. 388 is a judgment by the Supreme Court of Canada regarding a mother's request for the consent of the court to have her disabled daughter sterilized. This was a landmark case which is influential in Canadian legal decisions involving proxy-consented, non-therapeutic medical procedures performed on people of diminished mental capacity. Eve was a 24-year-old woman with "extreme expressive aphasia" and was at least "mildly to moderately retarded" with learning skills at a limited level. The Supreme Court of Canada ruled in favour of Eve, and unanimously rejected Mrs. E.'s request for authorization to perform a sterilization procedure. The opinion of the Supreme Court of Canada was that "barring emergency situations, a surgical procedure without consent ordinarily constitutes battery, [and] it will be obvious that the onus of proving the need for the procedure is on those who seek to have it performed...In conducting these procedures, it is obvious that a court must proceed with extreme caution; otherwise...it would open the way for abuse of the mentally incompetent, ...[so the court] would allow the appeal and restore the decision" of the original court, which had rejected the petition.

== 1990s ==
- 1993 - Barbara Turnbull made a complaint with the Ontario Human Rights Commission over lack of accessibility in cinemas operated by Famous Players Theatres; in 2001 the commission ruled in her favor, however two cinemas were closed instead of made fully accessible.
- 1993 – Sue Rodriguez, who lived in Victoria, British Columbia, was diagnosed with amyotrophic lateral sclerosis (ALS) in early 1991. She fought to have a legal right to assisted suicide; under the Criminal Code, assisted suicide is punishable by a maximum sentence of 14 years in prison. She took her cause to the Supreme Court of Canada, but ultimately lost the battle. On September 30, 1993, in what would become a landmark decision, Rodriguez v. British Columbia (Attorney General), the SCC held 5–4 against her.
- 1997 – In Eldridge v. British Columbia (Attorney General) [1997] 2 S.C.R. 624, the Supreme Court of Canada ruled that sign language interpreters must be provided in the delivery of medical services where doing so is necessary to ensure effective communication.

== 2000s ==
- 2000 – The Psychiatric Patient Built Wall Tours take place in Toronto, ON at the CAMH facility on Queen St West. The tours show the patient built walls from the 19th century that are located at present day CAMH. The purpose of the tours is to give a history on the lives of the patients who built the walls, and bring attention to the harsh realities of psychiatry. Geoffrey Reaume and Heinz Klein first came up with the idea of walking tours as part of a Mad Pride event in 2000. The first wall tour occurred on what is now known as Mad Pride Day, on July 14, 2000, with an attendance of about fifty people. Reaume solely leads the tours, and they have grown from annual events for Mad Pride, to occurring several times throughout the year in all non-winter months.
- 2001 – In R. v. Latimer [2001] 1 S.C.R. 3, the Supreme Court of Canada ruled that Robert Latimer's crime of murdering his disabled daughter Tracy Latimer could not be justified through the defence of necessity. Furthermore, the Supreme Court of Canada found that despite the special circumstances of the case, the lengthy prison sentence given to Mr. Latimer was not cruel and unusual, and therefore not a breach of section 12 of the Canadian Charter of Rights and Freedoms.
- 2003 – In Starson v. Swayze, 2003 SCC 32, [2003] 1 S.C.R. 722, the Supreme Court of Canada ruled that Mr. Starson had the right to refuse psychiatric medication because the Consent and Capacity board did not have enough evidence to support its finding that Mr. Starson was incapable of deciding on treatment.
- 2005 – The Accessibility for Ontarians with Disabilities Act, 2005 is a statute enacted in 2005 for the purpose of improving accessibility standards for Ontarians with physical and mental disabilities to all public establishments by 2025. Some employers began taking steps to bring their organizations into compliance in 2005.

== 2010s ==
- 2010 - In July 2010 in Vancouver, the board of the 21st International Congress on the Education of the Deaf (ICED) formally voted to reject all of the 1880 Milan resolutions.
- 2011 – The Joseph Maraachli case refers to an international controversy over the life of Joseph Maraachli, commonly known as Baby Joseph, a Canadian infant who was diagnosed with a rare progressive and incurable neurological disorder called Leigh's disease. A hearing before the Consent and Capacity Board of Ontario in regard to him took place in January 2011. On January 22, the Board released its decision, holding that the course of action in the child's "best interests" would be "removal of the endotracheal tube without replacement, a Do Not Resuscitate order and palliative care." The parents were ordered to consent to the removal of the breathing tube. They decided to appeal the Board's decision in the Ontario Superior Court of Justice. Still in 2011, an hour after the lawyers delivered their arguments, Justice Helen Rady returned with her decision, upholding the Board's decision as "reasonable" and dismissing the family's appeal. The family was ordered to give consent for the breathing tube's removal by February 21, 2011. The family refused to consent to the breathing tube's removal, and thus it was not removed on February 21. Joseph's parents fought to have him transferred to the United States, arguing that while Joseph's disease was terminal, a tracheotomy would extend his life and allow him to die at home. After several months and efforts by American pro-life groups, Joseph was transferred to a Catholic hospital in St. Louis, Missouri, where the procedure was performed in 2011. The successfully-obtained procedure extended Joseph's life for several months. Joseph died in 2011, at his home.
- 2012 – Queer activists glitter bombed Dan Savage on January 21, 2012, on the way into his "It Gets Better" show at the Vogue Theatre in Vancouver. His response was "Oh no! Not again!" The group said the bombing was in response to "ableism, ageism, classism, misogyny, racism, rape-apologism, serophobia, sizism, transphobia and, oh yeah, that column".
- 2012 – Canada's Department of Veterans Affairs ended its policy of deducting the amount of disabled veterans' pensions from benefits for lost earnings and Canadian Forces income support, which were introduced in 2006 under the New Veterans Charter.
- 2019 - The Accessible Canada Act became law. This was the first national Canadian legislation on accessibility to affect all government departments and federally regulated agencies.

== 2020s ==
- 2024: A crosswalk in Alberta was painted with the colors of the disability pride flag.
