= Victoria Casey =

New Zealand lawyer (c. 2010s)

- Education: University of Auckland
- Occupation: Lawyer

Victoria Casey KC is a lawyer and King's Counsel from Wellington, New Zealand.

Graduating from the University of Auckland, Casey was admitted to the bar in 1988, and worked for Bell Gully until 2002. From 2002, she worked at the law firm Meredith Connell, leaving there in 2003 to join the independent bar. In 2008, she was appointed Crown Counsel at Crown Law. Upon returning to the independent bar in 2012, she began specialising in public law, commercial law, and commercial–regulatory litigation.

Throughout 2015, she was the representative for Lecretia Seales, a terminally ill lawyer with a brain tumour who sought to voluntarily end her life, a case which culminated in the legislation of euthanasia in New Zealand. Casey was appointed as a Queen's Counsel in Wellington in 2016, the role in which she remains.

== Career ==
Casey graduated from the University of Auckland and was admitted to the bar in 1988. Shortly after graduating, she worked at the Auckland and Wellington offices of Bell Gully, a New Zealand law firm. In 2002, Casey joined the firm Meredith Connell, remaining there until 2003, where she joined the independent bar. She was appointed Crown Counsel at Crown Law in 2008. In 2012, Casey returned to the independent bar, where she specialised in areas including public law, commercial law and commercial–regulatory litigation. In 2015, Casey acted on behalf of the vulnerable persons umbrella group CARE Alliance in the high-profile case of Lecretia Seales, a terminally ill lawyer with a brain tumour who sought legal medical assistance to end her life. She was appointed as a Queen's Counsel in Wellington in 2016.
