= Euthanasia and assisted suicide in New Zealand =

Euthanasia and assisted suicide in New Zealand became legal when the End of Life Choice Act 2019 took full effect on 7 November 2021. It is illegal to "aid and abet suicide" under Section 179 of the New Zealand Crimes Act 1961. The clauses of this act make it an offence to "incite, procure or counsel" and "aid and abet" someone else to commit suicide, regardless of whether a suicide attempt is made or not. Section 179 covers both coercion to undertake assisted suicide and true suicide, such as that caused by bullying. This will not change under the End of Life Choices Act 2019, which has provisions on coercion of terminally ill people.

The controversial book The Peaceful Pill Handbook describing how to perform euthanasia was initially banned in New Zealand. Since May 2008 it has been allowed for sale to readers over eighteen years of age, if it is sealed and an indication of the censorship classification is displayed. In addition, author Philip Nitschke excised a section that dealt specifically with methods of suicide, which might otherwise have fallen afoul of Section 179.

The End of Life Choice Bill passed in parliament 69–51 in November 2019. The matter was decided at a binding referendum held alongside the 2020 general election, with the electorate voting in favour of legalisation. The legislation took effect one year after the official declaration of the referendum result, on 7 November 2021.

== Advance directives ==
Patients have the right to refuse treatment, even if it may shorten their life. Advance directives containing clauses that refuse consent to feed, or provide hydration to a person have been recognised by the courts as valid.

However, under section 31(1) of the End of Life Choices Act 2019, any advance directive that requests an assisted dying process under the Act is automatically invalid.

== Public opinion ==
2020 New Zealand euthanasia referendum result map

A survey done by Massey University in 2003 showed that 73% wanted assisted suicide legalised if it was performed by a doctor, but if done by others support dropped to 49%. The wording of the questions were:

"Suppose a person has a painful incurable disease. Do you think that doctors should be allowed by law to end the patient's life if the patient requests it?"
"Still thinking of that person with a painful incurable disease. Do you think that someone else, like a close relative, should be allowed by law to help end the patient's life, if the patient requests it?"

A survey carried out on behalf of the Voluntary Euthanasia Society in 2008 showed that 71% of New Zealanders want to have it legalised. The question read:

"In some countries, though not all, if you have an illness that results in your being unable to have an acceptable quality of life, you are legally allowed to get help from a doctor to help you to die. If you had an illness or condition which resulted in your having a quality of life that was totally unacceptable to you, would you like to have the legal right to choose a medically assisted death?"

The 2008 survey by Massey University gave similar results.

In 2015 a 3 News/Reid Research poll showed 71% want the law changed with 24% opposed.

== Stance by religious organisations ==
The Anglican Church in Aotearoa, New Zealand and Polynesia, part of the Anglican Communion is, the second largest church in New Zealand. On 1 February 2016, nine bishops made an oral submission to the Health Select Committee concerning medically assisted dying and Maryan Street's petition. In this submission they reiterated the importance of protecting human life and in conclusion made these three points:

1. New Zealand should not enact legislation that would establish medically-assisted dying as an authorised form of terminating life, thus undermining a fundamental ethical principle.
2. We should take steps to increase resources for palliative care, and the provision of social support for the lonely, ageing and depressed.
3. We should enhance support for families caring for those with terminal illnesses to assist them in understanding what is happening and likely to happen, how to manage stress and grief, and how to build positive relationships with the dying, remembering that dying can be an important last phase of life in resolving conflicts of the past and establishing new relationships of love and care.

The Catholic Church in Aotearoa New Zealand, the largest Christian denomination in New Zealand, is broadly opposed to legalising euthanasia/physician assisted suicide. There are several reasons put forth by the New Zealand Catholic Bishops Bioethics Agency, The Nathaniel Centre, against legalising euthanasia/physician assisted suicide. Firstly, safeguards such as limiting of access to a narrow group of people will not eliminate the possibility of abuses occurring. They say that it is inevitable that when following a liberal philosophy in this instance, boundaries established initially will likely be widened to allow for other interest groups to access euthanasia. Secondly, granting the choice to be killed, or receive aided death will undermine the choice and/or will of many others to live. Thirdly, legalising physician assisted suicide/euthanasia infers acceptance of the notion that 'some suicides are okay'. They say this would undermine work undertaken in recent years by various non-government and government groups to remove the various stigmas associated depression and other mental illnesses that are known to be influencing factors in an individual not seeking treatment, which ultimately leads to some individuals ending their own life. This is particularly so in relation to youth suicide. Finally, broad societal support is given to the ongoing effort within the practice of palliative care to address the needs of the whole patient and their families. They say that legalising euthanasia/physician assisted suicide may hamper progress in supporting quality of life for those who want to live. "The key issue is not compassion or morality—people on both sides of the debate want to prevent intolerable suffering. The key issue is the long-term consequences of a law change for public safety. This is an issue of social justice—protecting the vulnerable."

The Salvation Army opposes euthanasia. They do not see it as "death with dignity" and say that individuals do not have the right to take their own life.

New Zealand anti-abortion organisations such as Voice for Life and Right to Life New Zealand are also opposed to decriminalisation of voluntary euthanasia or physician assisted suicide, although this has usually been subordinate to their opposition to abortion in New Zealand.

However, according to the New Zealand census, New Zealand is an increasingly secular society and it is probable that it is medical practitioners organisations that have greater credibility when it comes to opposition to euthanasia law reform. The New Zealand Medical Association and Hospice New Zealand do not support the legalisation of euthanasia.

== Attempts at legalisation ==
Two attempts to allow for legal euthanasia in New Zealand have failed to get through Parliament. In 1995 Michael Laws championed the Death with Dignity Bill, which aimed to legalise voluntary euthanasia. The terminal illness of Cam Campion, a colleague in Laws' first term in Parliament, prompted this advocacy. It failed by 61 votes against and 29 supporting the bill.

Peter Brown, when he was an MP for the New Zealand First political party, introduced a Death with Dignity Bill in 2003, but it was defeated by 60 votes opposing to 58 supporting. Brown became an advocate for euthanasia after his wife died of cancer in 1984.

On 11 March 2012, New Zealand Labour Party list MP Maryan Street announced that she was forwarding another member's bill to the parliamentary ballot box to forward the debate after witnessing the deaths of her mother and sister from incurable illnesses. The proposed legislation was known as the End of Life Choices Bill. By mid-July 2013, there were reports that her party colleagues were requesting that Street withdraw the bill, given the possibility that it would distract from other issues during 2014 general election campaign.

On 6 June 2015, ACT New Zealand MP David Seymour confirmed that he was preparing a member's bill that would legalise medical aid in dying after Seales v Attorney-General found that only Parliament had the ability to address assisted dying laws. He entered the End of Life Choice Bill into the ballot on 14 October 2015. The bill passed its first reading 76–44 in December 2017, its second reading 70–50 in June 2019, and its third reading 69–51 in November 2019.

On 30 October 2020 the euthanasia referendum result was announced, showing 65.2% voting in favour and 33.8% voting against.

== Court cases ==
=== Lesley Martin ===
Lesley Martin received nationwide media coverage over the trial of the attempted murder of her mother. In her 2002 book To Die Like A Dog she revealed that she killed her mother due to the pain that she was suffering and was arrested shortly after its release. Martin was given a 15-month sentence of which she served seven and a half months. Martin has since retired from euthanasia reform activism and dissolved Dignity New Zealand.

=== Sean Davison ===
In a similar case, professor Sean Davison wrote his memoir, The Last Waltz: Love, Death & Betrayal, published in 2015, documenting the final days of his mother's life in 2006. A leaked copy of an early manuscript of the book revealed that he offered his mother a dose of morphine to help end her life. He was initially charged with attempted murder in 2011, but later pleaded guilty to the lesser charge of inciting and procuring suicide. He was sentenced to five months' home detention.

=== Lecretia Seales ===
In 2015, lawyer and cancer sufferer Lecretia Seales put a case before the High Court to challenge New Zealand law for her right to die with the assistance of her GP, asking for a declaration that her GP would not risk conviction. She died of natural causes shortly after her family had received the judge's decision in Seales v Attorney-General, but before it was made public.

== Organisations ==
The two main organisations lobbying for euthanasia in New Zealand are:

- the End Of Life choice society (formerly known as the Voluntary Euthanasia Society)
- the New Zealand chapter of Exit International

There were internal disagreements between Dignity New Zealand's Lesley Martin and Exit International's Philip Nitschke over the best way to provide voluntary euthanasia/physician assisted suicide for those who desire it. Martin favoured the introduction of legislation and regulation to control assisted suicide while Nitschke promotes autonomy and individual choice and responsibility at the end of life irrespective of existing legislation. Similar divisions occurred between organisations that sanction decriminalised and regulated voluntary euthanasia/physician assisted suicide and the late Jack Kevorkian in the United States, over similar tactical and strategic questions.

The main organisation lobbying against euthanasia in New Zealand is The Care Alliance, a broad coalition of organisations from medical, family values, social, ethics, faith, disability, and other areas of society that advocates for better conversations around dying and improved access to palliative and other end of life medical and health practices. The Care Alliance members, however, share an understanding that compassionate and ethical end of life care does not include euthanasia and assisted suicide.

The members of The Care Alliance are:

- Australian & New Zealand Society of Palliative Medicine
- Christian Medical Fellowship
- Euthanasia Free NZ
- Family First New Zealand
- Hospice New Zealand
- Lutherans for Life
- New Zealand Health Professionals Alliance
- Not Dead Yet Aotearoa
- Pacific Leadership Forum
- Palliative Care Nurses New Zealand
- The Nathaniel Centre
- The Salvation Army in New Zealand

== See also ==
- Culture of New Zealand
- Religion in New Zealand
- Euthanasia and assisted suicide in Australia
- Voluntary Assisted Dying Act 2017 (Victoria)
