= Sue Rodriguez =

Canadian right-to-die activist

Susan Rodriguez
- Born: Susan Jane Shipley; August 2, 1950; Winnipeg, Manitoba, Canada
- Died: February 12, 1994 (aged 43); Victoria, British Columbia, Canada
- Known for: Amyotrophic lateral sclerosis (ALS) sufferer who unsuccessfully litigated for the right to die by assisted suicide
- Children: 1

Sue Rodriguez (August 2, 1950 – February 12, 1994) was a Canadian right-to-die activist. In August 1991, she was diagnosed with amyotrophic lateral sclerosis (ALS or Lou Gehrig's disease) and was given two to five years to live. She ultimately made the decision to end her life and she sought the assistance of a doctor to that end, leading to a legal battle. She lost her case in front of the Supreme Court of Canada, but took her own life with the help of an anonymous doctor on February 12, 1994. She is cited as an important figure in the eventual legalization of medical assistance in dying in Canada.

== Life ==
Sue Rodriguez was born in Winnipeg, Manitoba and grew up in the Ontario suburb of Thornhill. She lived in California for a time before returning to Canada to settle in British Columbia. She married Henry Rodriguez and had a son, Cole Rodriguez.

== Death ==
After her ALS diagnosis, Rodriguez requested the help of a physician for medical aid in dying. However, no physicians were willing to fulfill the request; under section 241(b) of Canada's Criminal Code, anyone who "...aids or abets a person to commit suicide, whether suicide ensues or not, is guilty of an indictable offence and liable to imprisonment for a term not exceeding fourteen years". Rodriguez sought a legal exception in her home province, British Columbia, but was denied.

The British Columbia Civil Liberties Association (BCCLA) filed a lawsuit, Rodriguez v British Columbia (AG), that challenged section 241(b) as contrary to sections 7, 12, and 15 of the Canadian Charter of Rights and Freedoms. In a videotaped address to Parliament on November 24, 1992, Rodriguez famously asked, "If I cannot give consent to my own death, whose body is this? Who owns my life?" On May 20, 1993, her case was heard by the Supreme Court of Canada. On September 30 of that year, it decided against her 5–4.

On February 12, 1994, with the assistance of an anonymous doctor, Sue Rodriguez ended her own life by ingesting a liquid mixture of morphine and secobarbital. The doctor's intervention was arranged by MP Svend Robinson, who was regarded as one of Rodriguez's most prominent supporters. Robinson was present at her death. However, by her request, her husband Henry and their son Cole were not. An investigation was undertaken, but no charges were laid. Robinson has vowed never to reveal the anonymous doctor's identity.

Almost 23 years later, on June 7, 2016, medical assistance in dying became legal in Canada as the result of a similar Supreme Court case, Carter v Canada (AG). The Court unanimously struck down parts of section 241(b) and section 14 of the Criminal Code which the justices ruled unjustifiably infringed on section 7 of the Charter of Rights and Freedoms.

== In the media ==
The 1996 book Timely Death was inspired by the Sue Rodriguez story, and the 1998 film At the End of the Day: The Sue Rodriguez Story, which stars Wendy Crewson as Sue Rodriguez, dramatizes her story.

On June 17, 2016, medically assisted dying became legal in Canada. An emotional Svend Robinson, who now lives in Geneva, Switzerland, told the press: "Today's ruling is a victory for compassion, for justice and for humanity. And I pay tribute to the memory of Sue Rodriguez, who with courage, passion and dignity blazed the trail that led to this historic day. She would have been thrilled".

== See also ==
- Gloria Taylor
