= Charter (disambiguation) =

A charter is the grant of authority or rights. Charter may also refer to:

== Brands and enterprises ==
- Charter Arms (1964), an American manufacturer of revolvers
- Charter Behavioral Health Systems, defunct operator of medical facilities
- Charter Communications (1993), a large American cable television, Internet and phone company
- Charter Company (1949–1999), a very large, defunct conglomerate that had more than 180 subsidiaries
- Charter International (1889–2012), a large British engineering business, acquired by Colfax Corporation in 2012

== Contracts, governing documents and official designations ==
- Congressional charter, symbolic charters issued by the United States Congress from 1791 to 1992
- Graphic charter, the rules about the graphic identity of an organisation
- Project charter, a statement of the scope, objectives and participants in a project
- University charter
- Municipal charter
- Charter school, a publicly funded school that operates independently of the local public school system
- Charter city, form of legal municipal structure
- Charter (New York), a grant of authority or rights issued by the New York State Education Department
- Charter township, township with village-like powers in Michigan
- Anglo-Saxon charters

=== Specific charters ===
- Canadian Charter of Rights and Freedoms, a bill of rights entrenched in the Constitution of Canada
- Charter of the French Language, a statute establishing French as the official language of the province of Quebec
- Charter of the United Nations, a statement of the scope, objectives of united nations
- Charter of the Rights of the Family (aka "The Charter" / "La Carta"), Catholic Church

== Transportation ==
- Air charter, the renting of an entire plane, as opposed to just seats on a flight
- Ship charter, the renting of a ship or boat
  - Bareboat charter, a type of ship or boat chartering whereby no crew or provisions are included
  - Yacht charter, the practice of renting a sailboat or motor yacht and travelling to various destinations
- The renting of an entire train, as an excursion train, or a city bus or tram

== Other uses ==
- Charters (surname)
- Andrew Charter, field hockey player
- Charter (typeface), a serif typeface designed for Bitstream Inc. by Matthew Carter in 1987
- Charter (film), a 2020 Swedish film

== See also ==
- Chartered (disambiguation)
- Charterhouse (disambiguation)
- Chartering (disambiguation)
- Charthouse
