= Religious views on suicide =

There are a variety of religious views on suicide.

Regarding suicide in the ancient European religions, both Roman and Greek, had a relaxed attitude.

== Indian religions ==
=== Buddhism ===
In Buddhism, an individual's past acts are recognized to heavily influence what they experience in the present; present acts, in turn, become the background influence for future experiences (the doctrine of karma). Intentional actions by mind, body or speech have a reaction. This reaction, or repercussion, is the cause of conditions and differences one encounters in life.

Buddhism teaches that all people experience substantial suffering (dukkha), in which suffering primarily originates from past negative deeds (karma), or may result as a natural process of the cycle of birth and death or yet (samsara). Other reasons for the prevalence of suffering concern the concepts of impermanence and illusion (maya). Since everything is in a constant state of impermanence or flux, individuals experience dissatisfaction with the fleeting events of life. To break out of samsara, Buddhism advocates the Noble Eightfold Path, and does not advocate suicide.

In Theravada Buddhism, for a monk to so much as praise death, including dwelling upon life's miseries or extolling stories of possibly blissful rebirth in a higher realm in a way that might condition the hearer to die by suicide or to pine away to death, is explicitly stated as a breach in one of highest vinaya codes, the prohibition against harming life, one that will result in automatic expulsion from Sangha.

For Buddhists, since the first precept is to refrain from the destruction of life, including one's self, suicide is seen as a negative act. If someone dies by suicide in anger, he may be reborn in a sorrowful realm due to negative final thoughts. Nevertheless, Buddhism does not condemn suicide without exception, but rather observes that the reasons for suicide are often negative and thus counteract the path to enlightenment. With that said, in thousands of years of Buddhist history, very few exceptions are found.

But in a Buddhist tale, a bhikkhu named Vakkali who was extremely ill and racked with excruciating pain, was said to have died by suicide when near death and upon making statements suggesting he had passed beyond desires (and thus perhaps an arahant). Self-euthanasia appears to be the context for his death.

Another case is the story of a bhikkhu named Godhika, also beset by illness, who had repeatedly attained temporary liberation of mind but was unable to gain final liberation due to illness. While believing himself again in a state of temporary liberation it occurred to him to cut his own throat, in hopes thus to be reborn in a high realm. The Buddha was said to have stated:

Such indeed is how the steadfast act:

They are not attached to life. Having drawn out craving at its root

Godhika has attained final Nibbāna.

Ultimately, tales like these could be read as implying past Buddhist beliefs that suicide might be acceptable in certain circumstances if it might lead to non-attachment. In both above cases, the monks were not enlightened before dying by suicide but they hoped to become enlightened following their deaths.

The Channovàda-sutra gives a third exceptional example of one who died by suicide and subsequently attained enlightenment.

In an entry in The Encyclopedia of Religion, Marilyn J. Harran wrote the following:

Buddhism in its various forms affirms that, while suicide as self-sacrifice may be appropriate for the person who is an arhat, one who has attained enlightenment, it is still very much the exception to the rule.

Sokushinbutsu in Japanese Buddhism involves asceticism to the point of death and entering mummification while alive. This is done to attain Buddha-nature in one's body.

=== Hinduism ===
In Hinduism, suicide is spiritually unacceptable. Generally, taking your own life is considered a violation of the code of ahimsa (non-violence) and therefore equally sinful as murdering another. Some scriptures state that to die by suicide (and any type of violent death) results in becoming a ghost, wandering earth until the time one would have otherwise died, had one not died by suicide.

The Mahabharata talks of suicide, stating those who perform the act can never attain regions (of heaven) that are blessed.

Hinduism accepts a person's right to end one's life through Prayopavesa by voluntarily refusing food and liquids in cases of terminal illnesses or severe disability.

=== Jainism ===
In Jainism, suicide is regarded as the worst form of himsā (violence) and is not permitted. Ahimsā (nonviolence) is the fundamental doctrine of Jainism.

According to the Jain text Puruşārthasiddhyupāya, "when death is near" the vow of sallekhanā (fasting to death) is observed by properly thinning the body and the passions. It also mentions that sallekhanā is not suicide since the person observing it is devoid of all passions like attachment.

=== Sikhism ===
In Sikhism, suicide is seen as unethical and selfish, as it is seen as leaving more pain to those left behind. Sikhs believe that the human-life is a precious gift from the Divine and that both sukh (pleasure, happiness) and dukh (pain, sadness) are necessary components in life. Sikhism teaches its followers to accept both pleasure and pain equally and treat them the same. Under the Sikh lens, the motivation to commit suicide originates from a paradoxical self-attachment that is deep-rooted, as if the individual views their life as their own possession.

== Abrahamic religions ==
=== Christianity ===
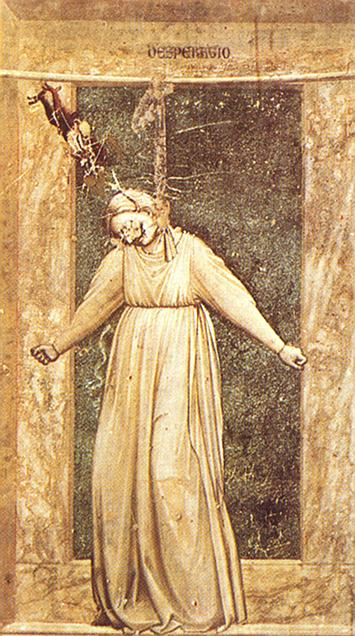
Painting by Giotto depicting a person committing the sin of desperatio, the rejection of God's mercy, because while choked they are unable to ask for repentance.

There is no express biblical warrant condemning and prohibiting suicide, and there are people mentioned within the Bible who die by suicide. Depending on a denomination's canon of books, there are seven or eleven suicides mentioned in the Bible. The descriptions of people in the Bible who died by suicide are negative. Major contexts include betrayal (Ahitophel and Judas) and divine judgement resulting in military defeat (Saul and Abimelech). In particular, Psalms 37:14–15 describes the "wicked" as falling on their own swords, and Zimri is described as having "died for his sins which he committed, doing evil in the eyes of Yahweh" (1 Kings 16:18–19). Many Christian theologians take an unfavorable view of suicide.

In early Christian traditions, the condemnation of suicide is reflected in the teachings of Lactantius, St. Augustine, Clement of Alexandria, and others. Among the martyrs at Antioch were three women who died by suicide to avoid rape; although professor William E. Phipps gives this as an example of virtuous early Christian suicides, Augustine declared that although they may have done "what was right in the sight of God," in his view the women "should not have assumed that rape would necessarily have deprived them of their purity" (as purity was, to Augustine, a state of mind).

Psalm 139:8 ("If I ascend up into heaven, thou art there: if I make my bed in hell, behold, thou art there.") has often been discussed in the context of those who die by suicide.

According to the theology of the Catholic Church, suicide is objectively a sin which violates the fifth commandment, "You shall not kill," Deuteronomy 5:17. However, the gravity and culpability for that sin changes based on the circumstances surrounding that sin. The Catechism of the Catholic Church (1992), Paragraph 2283 states: "We should not despair of the eternal salvation of persons who have taken their own lives. By ways known to him alone, God can provide the opportunity for salutary repentance. The Church prays for persons who have taken their own lives." Paragraph 2282 also points out that "Grave psychological disturbances, anguish, or grave fear of hardship, suffering, or torture can diminish the responsibility of the one committing suicide." The Catholic Church used to deny all suicides a Catholic funeral mass and burial in consecrated ground. However, the Church has since changed this practice.

Protestants, such as most mainstream Evangelicals, Charismatics, Pentecostals, and other denominations have often argued that suicide is self-murder, and so anyone who performs the act is sinning and it is the same as if the person murdered another human being. An additional view concerns the act of asking for salvation and accepting Jesus Christ as personal savior, which must be done prior to death. The unpardonable sin then becomes not the suicide itself, but rather the refusal of the gift of salvation. Most Pentecostals believe that a born-again person can still go to Heaven because the blood of Jesus covers the sin of suicide.

Suicide is regarded generally within the Eastern Orthodoxy tradition as a rejection of God's gift of physical life, a failure of stewardship, an act of despair, and a transgression of the sixth commandment, "You shall not kill" (Deuteronomy 5:17). The Orthodox Church normally denies a Christian burial to a person who has died by suicide. However, factors bearing on the particular case may become known to the priest who must share this information with the diocesan bishop; the bishop will consider the factors and make the decision concerning funeral services. However, the Eastern Orthodox Church shows compassion on those who have taken their own life because of mental illness or severe emotional stress, when a physician can verify a condition of impaired rationality.

Some other denominations of Christianity may not condemn those who die by suicide per se as committing a sin, even if suicide is not viewed favorably; factors such as motive, character, etc. are believed to be taken into account. One such example is The New Church. In the Church of Jesus Christ of Latter-day Saints, suicide is generally viewed as wrong, however the Church teaches those who die by suicide may not be responsible for their actions due to their circumstances and the act "will not be a defining characteristic of their eternities."

=== Islam ===
In Islam, suicide is considered a major sin, and those who kill themselves are disobedient. They will be punished in the Fire on the Day of Judgment because of this crime they committed. However, committing this sin does not take one out of the fold of Islam, and according to some scholars, nor does it necessarily condemn them to eternal damnation in Hell. As evidenced in the Quran:

"And to Allāh belongs whatever is in the heavens and whatever is on the earth. He forgives whom He wills and punishes whom He wills. And Allāh is Forgiving and Merciful."

— Surah Al Imran 3:129

However, it is universally prohibited based on a verse in the Qur'an which instructs:

"And do not kill yourselves, surely God is most Merciful to you."

— Surah An-Nisa 4:29

The prohibition of suicide has also been recorded in multiple statements of Hadith (sayings of Muhammad); for example:

Narrated Abu Huraira: The Prophet said, "He who commits suicide by throttling shall keep on throttling himself in the Hell-Fire and he who commits suicide by stabbing himself shall keep on stabbing himself in the Hell-Fire."

— Sahih al-Bukhari, 2:23:446

Muslims view life as a gift from Allah to humans. In Islamic law, preserving life is one of the five essential objectives. Islamic teachings emphasize that life in this world is temporary and is a period of testing, an abode of trials and tribulations and that true life is the hereafter, where humans are rewarded or punished by Allah. On this basis, Islam encourages patience in obedience to Allah and in facing life's difficulties with faith and hope in Allah and the Last Day, acceptance of Allah's decree, and without despair or hopelessness. Allah rewards his servants in the hereafter. The concept of personal freedom does not exceed the boundaries of servitude to Allah, the Lord of the Worlds. Death is not an escape from life, and it does not end with it. The punishment for the one who kills himself is only realised in the afterlife since people cannot punish a dead person. The deceased's family are not punished for a sin they did not commit, and the one who kills himself bears the sin of murder, which may include tormenting oneself, distressing one's family and community, and possibly causing a loss of rights and obligations related to others.

It is well known that a person can choose certain things in life and has the freedom to choose what to eat, drink, wear, do, or abstain from. However, it is certain that there are limitations to this freedom and that this choice does not exceed the bounds of what is possible, as evidenced by reality. A person did not create himself, cannot determine the characteristics with which he is born, and does not have control over life and death. He cannot decide when he will be born, how long he will live, or prevent his own death. There are many things he is incapable of, and he undoubtedly depends on others for existence and life.

Thus, he cannot violate laws or infringe upon others. His freedom necessitates respecting the rights of others. The fact that he did not create himself means he is dependent on the Creator who brought him into existence and gave him life, which is Allah. Life belongs to Allah, and for a person to kill himself exceeds the bounds of the choice that Allah has granted him. Considering suicide a sin against Allah means that the concept of personal freedom does not extend beyond the person being a servant owned by Allah, and he does not have absolute freedom.

Views on euthanasia vary.

Many Muslim scholars and clerics consider suicide forbidden, including suicide attacks.

=== Judaism ===
Suicides are frowned upon and buried in a separate part of a Jewish cemetery and may not receive certain mourning rites. In practice, every means is used to excuse suicide—usually by determining either that the suicide itself proves that the person was not in their right mind, or that the person must have repented after performing the deadly act but shortly before death occurred. Taking one's own life may be seen as a preferred alternative to committing certain cardinal sins. Most authorities hold that it is not permissible to hasten death to avoid pain if one is dying in any event, but the Talmud is somewhat unclear on the matter. However, assisting in suicide and requesting such assistance (thereby creating an accomplice to a sinful act) is forbidden, a violation of Leviticus 19:14 ("Thou shalt not curse the deaf, nor put a stumbling-block before the blind"), which is understood as prohibiting tempting to sin as well as literally setting up physical obstacles.

Biblical and other Jewish accounts of suicide include those of Samson and the woman with seven sons. Although the Jewish historian Josephus described a Jewish mass suicide at Masada, according to the archaeologist Kenneth Atkinson, no "archaeological evidence that Masada's defenders committed mass suicide" exists.

== Neopagan religions ==
=== Wicca ===
In Wicca as well as numerous other Neopagan religions, there is no consensus concerning suicide. Some view suicide as a violation of the sanctity of life, and a violation of the most fundamental of Wiccan laws, the Wiccan Rede. However, as Wicca teaches a belief in reincarnation instead of permanent rewards or punishments, many believe that suicides are reborn (like everyone else) to endure the same circumstances in each subsequent lifetime until the capacity to cope with the circumstance develops.

== See also ==
- Church of Euthanasia
- Prayopavesa
- Sallekhana
- Seppuku
- Sokushinbutsu
- Voodoo death
- Allahiyah
