= Charters (surname) =

Charters is a surname. Notable people with the surname include:

- Ann Charters (born 1936), American professor of English
- Charlie Charters (born 1968), former English rugby union official and sports marketing executive
- Frank Charters, (1884–1953), English cricketer
- Harvey Charters (1912–1995), Canadian canoer
- James Christian Charters a.k.a. DJ Ironik (born 1988), British musician, DJ and rapper
- John Charters, former New Zealand rower
- Samuel Charters (Canadian politician) (1863–1943), Ontario newspaper publisher and politician
- Samuel Charters (1929–2015), American music historian and writer
- Spencer Charters (1875–1943), American film actor

== See also ==
- Charter (disambiguation)
