= NACF =

NACF may refer to:

- National Agricultural Cooperative Federation
- National Art Collections Fund
- Native Arts and Cultures Foundation
- National Association of Catholic Families
