= Jo Roman =

American social worker, therapist, artist, author

Jo Roman (born Mary Clodfelter in 1917, died June 10, 1979) was an American social worker, therapist, artist, author and advocate of "rational suicide".

== Early life and career ==
She was born in Massachusetts and raised in the Lancaster, Pennsylvania area.

After the death of her first husband, she moved with her two children to Juneau, Alaska, to start an interior design business. A year or so later she began studying psychology at the University of North Carolina.

After achieving a master's degree in social work at Adelphi University circa 1952, she began working with the Manhattan Family Court and then became the director of the mental health clinic at the University Settlement House on the Lower East Side. In 1959 she married Dr. Mel Roman, an author, psychotherapist and artist.

Jo Roman's art, including paintings and "tactile boxes", were displayed in group and individual exhibitions and reviewed in art publications throughout the late 1960s and early 1970s.

== Advocacy and death ==
In 1965 Roman developed an intense interest in the philosophy, ethics and practice of "rational suicide" and concluded that the act was a "natural human right", morally comparable to having a baby or getting married. She began planning her own suicide, which she initially calculated to take place around the year 1992, when she would have been 75 years old.

In April 1978, however, she received a diagnosis of terminal breast cancer, with the most optimistic prognosis being that she had three to five years of life remaining. She began to undergo chemotherapy but, experiencing adverse reactions, decided instead to bring her plans for "self-termination" forward rather than suffer the pain and indignity of a prolonged terminal illness for the next several years.

Her preparations included completing a 250-page manuscript for a book titled Exit House: Choosing Suicide as an Alternative, which proposed state-sponsored institutions where people could end their own lives painlessly and with dignity. She also sent her own obituary to the New York Times, forwarded 100 copies of a personal letter to her family and friends and organized a ceremonial symposium/farewell party held in her art studio on Saturday, June 9, 1979, during which guests helped her create a final artwork representing her life and death. The symposium was recorded by a video documentary crew led by documentarian Richard Ellison.

Jo Roman committed suicide via an overdose of sleeping pills during the early morning following the symposium, on Sunday, June 10, 1979. She was 62 years old.

== Cultural legacy ==
The 20 hours of video recordings were edited into the documentary Choosing Suicide, which was broadcast nationwide by PBS on June 16, 1980, and sparked a vehement controversy among viewers and reviewers. Roman's book Exit House was published in the same year.

In subsequent decades, Jo Roman's works of art and advocacy have frequently been cited in academic journals and popular media concerning the moral right to die.

== Sources ==
- Ellison, Richard (1980) Television Quarterly: The Journal of the National Academy of Television Arts and Sciences, Volume XVII Number II "On 'Choosing Suicide': Documentary as Confrontation"
- Johnston, Laurie (17 June 1979) New York Times "Artist's Death: A Last Statement In a Thesis on 'Self‐Termination’"
