= Chartering =

Chartering may refer to:

- Air charter
- Chartering (shipping)

== See also ==
- Charter (disambiguation)
