= Chartered =

Chartered may refer to:

- Charter, a legal document conferring rights or privileges
  - University charter
  - Chartered company
- Chartered (professional), a professional credential
- Charter (shipping)
- Charter (airlines)
- Charter (typeface)
- Chartered Semiconductor Manufacturing, a manufacturing company

== See also ==
- Charter (disambiguation)
