= Haleigh Poutre =

American woman

- Born: February 24, 1994 (age 32); Westfield, Massachusetts
- Known for: Subject of legal controversy

Haleigh Poutre (born February 24, 1994) is an American woman who became the subject of a legal controversy regarding the removal of life support for patients in persistent vegetative states. In January 2006, shortly before she was scheduled to be removed from life support, eleven-year-old Poutre awoke from a coma she had been in since September 2005. Poutre had a severe brain injury thought to be caused by abuse by her adoptive mother. The case brought about many changes in the Massachusetts Department of Social Services, both in the way they handle reports of child abuse as well as their policies on end-of-life care for children in their custody.

== Background ==
At the age of four, Haleigh Poutre went to live with her maternal aunt, Holli Strickland, and Strickland's husband Jason, following allegations of sexual abuse at the hands of her mother's boyfriend. In 2001, Holli Strickland alone legally adopted Haleigh. When asked in court why he never legally adopted Haleigh, Jason Strickland replied, "Honestly, I didn't feel like I needed a piece of paper to say I was her father."

== Injury ==
On September 11, 2005, Haleigh was taken to the emergency room at Noble Hospital in Westfield, Massachusetts, by Holli and Jason Strickland. They reported to medical staff that she had become unresponsive after suffering from "flu-like symptoms". Physicians determined that her brain stem was partly sheared, leaving her in a vegetative state. Physicians also noted a number of other injuries including broken teeth, numerous contusions and lacerations on Haleigh's body, and several burns in various stages of healing.

On September 20, 2005, the Stricklands were arrested and charged with assault and battery. Holli Strickland was shot to death two days later while out on bond. Police believe her death on September 22, 2005, to be a murder-suicide at the hands of her grandmother, Constance Young.

== End of life debate ==
Following criminal charges, the Department of Social Services took custody of eleven-year-old Poutre. Eight days after she was admitted to the hospital, Harry Spence, the commissioner of the Massachusetts Department of Social Services, sought to remove her from life support. Physicians involved in the case asserted that Poutre was in a vegetative state, and "virtually brain dead." On October 5, 2005, a judge approved the request. Jason Strickland, Poutre's stepfather, appealed the decision. Although Jason Strickland had never legally adopted Poutre, he asserted his right to make the decision as the de facto parent.

Complicating the issue was the criminal case against Jason Strickland. If Poutre died, the state could bring murder charges against Strickland. But if she lived, even in a vegetative state, the charges brought against Strickland were significantly less severe. Many perceived the actions of Strickland to be an attempt at evading homicide charges.

On January 17, 2006, the Massachusetts Supreme Judicial Court ruled in favor of the Department of Social Services that life support could be removed. On January 18, 2006, Poutre's biological mother indicated Poutre was responding to her. As physicians were preparing to remove life support, Poutre regained consciousness. In the presence of Harry Spence, social workers asked Poutre to identify a series of items in front of her and she successfully completed the task. The order to remove life support was cancelled.

A number of Right to Life groups involved themselves with Poutre's case. They noted parallels between this case and the high-profile Terri Schiavo case which had ended in her death earlier that year. Schiavo's family, who runs the Terri Schindler Schiavo Foundation Center for Health Care Ethics Inc., contacted Mitt Romney regarding the Poutre case. Schiavo's father, Bob Schindler Sr., commented that there have been many similar cases and his foundation's goal is "essentially to guard against this rush to judgment."

== Policy changes in response to the case ==
The Department of Social Services faced harsh criticism for their role in the case. On June 14, 2006, a legislative oversight committee determined that Department of Social Services was at fault for failing to protect Poutre. Department of Social Services officials have acknowledged that they missed signs of abuse before she was brought to the hospital in September. The Department of Social Services received at least twelve reports of abuse or neglect of Poutre between 2001 and 2005. The department had been working with the Strickland family since 1998. The panel recommended a number of changes, including the creation of an audit bureau to review cases, an increase of educational requirements for social workers, and a revamping of abuse reporting systems.

In March 2006, Governor Mitt Romney appointed a panel of specialists to evaluate the case. "Haleigh's case highlights a frightening confluence of a health care system ignorant of abuse and a child protective system ignorant of medicine," they said. The panel also said current Department of Social Services procedures are "substantially insufficient" in their ability to make decisions regarding the withdrawal of life support from children in their custody. Recommendations included a number of changes, including increased access to medical, psychiatric, and child abuse expertise, and the creation of a new system for making end-of-life decisions.

On July 8, 2008, Governor Deval L. Patrick signed a new law to overhaul the child welfare system in Massachusetts. Changes include a requirement that the case undergo a special review by a state board if the Department of Social Services receives three or more reports of suspected child abuse. The results of that review will then be evaluated by prosecutors and police in the area. A new child-advocate position was also created. This advocate reports directly to the governor regarding severe child abuse or neglect in the state. The new law also involves increased penalties for failing to report child abuse. A new registry for keeping track of foster parents was also implemented. These changes were made largely in response to the Poutre case.

== Criminal case ==
In 2008, Jason Strickland was tried for the assault. Strickland admitted noticing Poutre's injuries, but claimed he believed Holli's story that the injuries were self inflicted. The story was also believed by the Department of Social Services and was the reason she was not removed from the home despite numerous reports to the agency.

During deliberations, jurors questioned whether Jason Strickland had to be present at the time of the assault in order for them to return a guilty verdict. Judge Carhart instructed them that he did not have to be present, but they would have to believe that an "ordinary person" would have realized that leaving Poutre in the care of Holli Strickland presented a serious risk of bodily harm. Strickland was convicted under this premise. Earlier in the trial, a friend of Holli Strickland's testified that she witnessed Holli push Poutre down the stairs three times in a row as a punishment, each time screaming at her to walk back up before pushing her down them again. Jurors did not believe that Jason Strickland was present for the specific assault that led to Poutre's near fatal injuries, but that he knew the abuse was ongoing. He was also convicted of other charges of assault and battery for striking Poutre himself on previous occasions; he was convicted on the assumption that although Holli was the primary abuser, he failed to stop that abuse. Strickland was sentenced to twelve to fifteen years in prison.

== Poutre's recovery ==
In 2008, Poutre was released from Brighton Rehabilitation Hospital to live as a foster child with Keith and Becky Arnett in Southwick, Massachusetts. She was adopted by the Arnetts in 2010, at the age of sixteen, and attended a special education program in the Southwick public school system. She remains substantially disabled and relies on a wheelchair, but is able to feed herself and use a letterboard to communicate. Regarding the attack, Poutre's adoptive father reports that she knows she was hurt, but she is unable to remember any specifics about the event.

== See also ==
- Persistent vegetative state
- Right to life
- Right to die
- Traumatic brain injury
- List of medical ethics cases
