= Right to die =

Moral and legal concept

The right to die is a concept based on the opinion that human beings are entitled to end their lives or undergo voluntary euthanasia. Possession of this right is often bestowed with the understanding that a person with a terminal illness, or in incurable pain has access to assisted suicide. The question of who, if anyone, may be empowered to make this decision is often the subject of debate.

Religious views on suicide vary from condoning the practice of "non-violent" suicide through fasting and starvation in Hinduism (Prayopavesa) and Jainism (Santhara), to considering it a grave sin, as in Catholicism, Islam, and Judaism.

== Ethics ==
The preservation and value of life have led to many medical advancements when it comes to treating patients. New devices and the development of palliative care have allowed humans to live longer than before. Prior to these medical advancements and care, the lifespans of those who were unconscious, minimally conscious, and in a vegetative state were short as they were unable to receive assistance with basic needs such as breathing and feeding. The advancement of medical technology raises the question about the quality of life of patients who are no longer conscious. For example, the right to self-determination questions the definition of quality and sanctity of life—if one had the right to live, then the right to die must follow suit. There are questions in ethics as to whether or not a right to die can coexist with a right to life. If it is argued that the right to life is inalienable, then it cannot be surrendered and therefore may be incompatible with a right to die. A second debate exists within bioethics over whether the right to die is universal, only applies under certain circumstances (such as terminal illness), or if it exists at all. It is also stated that 'right to live' is not synonymous to 'obligation to live.' From that perspective, the right to live can coexist with the right to die.

The right to die is supported and rejected by many. Arguments for this right include:

- If one has the right to live, then one must have the right to die, both on their terms.
- Death is a natural part of life.
- Our lives are our own, thus we may do with them as we please.
- If euthanasia is strictly controlled, we can avoid entering a slippery slope and prevent patients from seeking alternative methods which may not be legal.

Arguments against include:

- It can lead to a slippery slope; if we allow patients this right, it can expand and have dire consequences.
- Give rise to pressuring those to end their lives or the lives of others; ethically immoral by human and medical standards.
- "Throwing away" patients who are deemed no longer capable to be part of society.
- Decrease in palliative end-of-life care due to the expectation of terminal patients to exercise their right to die.

A court in the American state of Montana for example, has found that the right to die only applies to those with life-threatening medical conditions. Physician-assisted suicide advocate Ludwig Minelli, euthanasia expert Sean W. Asher, and bioethics professor Jacob M. Appel, in contrast, argue that all competent people have a right to end their own lives. Appel has suggested that the right to die is a test for the overall freedom of a given society. A professor in social work, Alexandre Baril, proposed to create an ethic of responsibility "based on a harm-reduction, non-coercive approach to suicide. [He] suggest that assisted suicide should be an option for suicidal people." He argued that the voice of suicidal people is viewed as illegitimate and that there are 'injunctions to live and to futurity' where suicidal subjects are oppressed and silenced. Baril suggests the word suicidism to describe the "[...] oppressive system (stemming from non-suicidal perspectives) functioning at the normative, discursive, medical, legal, social, political, economic, and epistemic levels in which suicidal people experience multiple forms of injustice and violence [...]" He suggests creating safer spaces and listening to suicidal people without forcing the 'will to live' upon them.

The 1991 Patient Self-Determination Act passed by the US Congress at the request of the financial arm of Medicare does permit elderly Medicare/Medicaid patients (and by implication, all "terminal" patients) to prepare an advance directive in which they elect or choose to refuse life-extending and/or life-saving treatments as a means of shortening their lives and thus suffering unto certain death. Under the Act, the treatment refused in an advance directive does not have to be proved to be "medically futile" under some existing due-process procedure developed under state laws, such as TADA in Texas.

The right to die, also known as the right to death, is an ethical and legal concept that supports the freedom of a human being to end their life or undergo voluntary euthanasia. This right is generally associated with individuals suffering from a terminal illness or lacking the will to continue living, and it may allow them to terminate their own life, refuse life-prolonging treatment, or opt for assisted suicide or euthanasia. The question of who should be able to exercise this right is often central to the debate.

Some scholars and philosophers, such as David Benatar, approach this debate in terms of antinatalism. Since human beings do not have the power to act at the time of their birth, no one should have authority over a person's decision to continue living or to die.

Supporters of the right to die often connect it to the idea that a person's body and life belong solely to themselves, and they should have the freedom to dispose of them as they see fit, understanding that the right to life does not imply a duty or obligation to live. However, a legitimate state interest in preventing irrational suicides is typically opposed. For example, Avital Pilpel and Lawrence Amsel argue:

"Contemporary advocates of rational suicide or the right to die generally demand, for reasons of rationality, that the decision to end one's life be an autonomous choice of the individual (i.e., not due to pressure from doctors or family to 'do what is right' and commit suicide), that the choice be 'the best option in these circumstances' (desired by Stoics or utilitarians), as well as other natural conditions, such as the stability of the decision, the absence of impulsivity, the absence of mental illness, deliberation, etc."

== By country ==
Status of euthanasia around the world: Active voluntary euthanasia legal (Belgium, Canada, Colombia, Ecuador, Luxembourg, the Netherlands, New Zealand, Spain and Australia) Passive euthanasia legal (refusal of treatment / withdrawal of life support) Active euthanasia illegal, passive euthanasia not legislated or regulated All forms of euthanasia illegal

Current status of assisted suicide around the world: Physician-assisted suicide is legal. Legalized by court ruling, but not legislated or regulated Physician-assisted suicide is illegal.

As of 2026, some forms of voluntary euthanasia are legal in Australia, Belgium, Canada, Colombia, Luxembourg, the Netherlands, New Zealand, Spain and Switzerland.

=== Australia ===
As euthanasia is a health issue, under the Australian constitution this falls to state and territory governments to legislate and manage.

Euthanasia was legal within the Northern Territory during parts of 1996–1997 as a result of the territory parliament passing Rights of the Terminally Ill Act 1995. As a territory and not a state, the federal government under Prime Minister John Howard amended the Northern Territory (Self-Government) Act 1978 (amongst others) to ensure that territories of Australia are no longer able to legislate on euthanasia. However, this was repealed in December 2022 with the passing of Restoring Territory Rights Act. The federal government is not able to legislate restrictions on health issues for the Australian states and territories in the same manner.

Voluntary assisted dying schemes have been in effect in the following states; Victoria since 19 June 2019, Western Australia since 1 July 2021, Tasmania since 23 October 2022, Queensland since 1 January 2023, and South Australia since 31 January 2023. New South Wales was the final state to pass legislation for assisted dying in May 2022, which went into effect on 28 November 2023.

=== Belgium ===
In 2002, the Belgian parliament legalized euthanasia.

=== Canada ===
In August 2011, a British Columbia Supreme Court judge requested to speed up a right to die lawsuit so that Gloria Taylor could have a doctor assist her in dying by suicide. She had Lou Gehrig's disease. She died of an infection in 2012.

On February 6, 2015, the Supreme Court of Canada ruled that denying the right to assisted suicide was unconstitutional. The court's ruling limits physician-assisted suicides to "a competent adult person who clearly consents to the termination of life and has a grievous and irremediable medical condition, including an illness, disease or disability, that causes enduring suffering that is intolerable to the individual in the circumstances of his or her condition." The ruling was suspended for 12 months to allow the Canadian parliament to draft a new, constitutional law to replace the existing one. The court decision includes a requirement that there must be stringent limits that are "scrupulously monitored." This will require the death certificate to be completed by an independent medical examiner, not the treating physician, to ensure the accuracy of reporting the cause of death. The Canadian Medical Association (CMA) reported that not all doctors were willing to assist in a patient's death due to legal complications and went against what a physician stood for. Many physicians stated that they should have a voice when it comes to helping a patient end their life. However, the belief in late 2015 was that no physician would be forced to do so but the CMA was offering educational sessions to members as to the process that would be used.

On June 17, 2016, legislation passed both houses of the Parliament of Canada and received Royal Assent to allow euthanasia within Canada.

=== Colombia ===
On 20 May 1997, the Constitutional Court of Colombia decriminalised piety homicide, for terminally ill patients, stating that "the medical author cannot be held responsible for the assisted suicide of a terminally ill patient" and urged Congress to regulate euthanasia "in the shortest time possible".

On 15 December 2014, the Constitutional Court had given the Ministry of Health and Social Protection 30 days to publish guidelines for the healthcare sector to use in order to guarantee terminally ill patients, with the wish to undergo euthanasia, their right to a dignified death.

=== Germany ===
In February 2020, the Federal Constitutional Court ruled that the right to personal identity in German constitutional law encompasses a right to self-determined death, which in turn contains a right to suicide. Notably, this right is not limited to terminally ill patients, instead finding its limits within the requirement for the choice to be autonomous. The ruling has sparked controversy, with opponents arguing that the ruling may enable peer pressure into assisted suicide.

=== India ===
Since 2018, the Supreme Court of India has legalized passive euthanasia in India during a case involving Aruna Shanbaug under strict conditions, namely that the patient's consent (or relatives) is needed, and that the patient must be terminally ill or vegetative state. In 2026, Supreme Court of India accepted the plea of Harish Rana for passive euthanasia who was in the vegetative state for past thirteen years.

=== Netherlands ===
The Netherlands legalized voluntary euthanasia in 2002. Under Dutch law, euthanasia and assisted suicide can only be performed by doctors, and that is only legal in cases of "hopeless and unbearable" suffering. In practice, this means that it is limited to those with serious and incurable medical conditions (including mental illness) and in considerable suffering like pain, hypoxia or exhaustion. Helping somebody to die by suicide without meeting the qualifications of the Dutch euthanasia law is illegal. These criteria concern the patient's request, the patient's suffering (unbearable), the infaust prognosis (hopeless), the information provided to the patient, the absence of reasonable alternatives, consultation of another physician and the applied method of ending life.

=== New Zealand ===
Euthanasia is legal in New Zealand. In 2015, a lawyer with cancer Lecretia Seales brought a case (Seales v Attorney-General) to the High Court to challenge New Zealand law for her right to die with the assistance of her GP, asking for a declaration that her GP would not risk conviction. However legislation to legalize euthanasia for terminally ill patients was voted upon in the 2020 general election and was voted in favour of legalisation. The End Of Life Choice Bill took effect on 7 November 2021.

=== Peru ===
Peru legally forbids euthanasia. In 2020, a legal challenge to the law was launched by Ana Estrada, aimed at decriminalizing the practice.

=== United States ===
The term right to die has been interpreted in many ways, including issues of suicide, passive euthanasia, active euthanasia, assisted suicide, and physician-assisted suicide.

In the United States, public support for the right to die by physician-assisted suicide has increased over time. In a 2005 survey, the Pew Research Center found that 70% of participants say that there are circumstances in which a patient should be allowed to die; however, only 46% of participants approved of laws permitting doctors to assist patients in ending their lives. In May 2018, a Gallup poll report announced that 72% of responders said that doctors should legally be allowed to help terminally ill patients die. However, framing effects of using language such as "suicide" rather than "ending one's life" have the potential to lower approval rates by 10-15%.

A 2014 survey of physicians revealed that 54% of respondents agreed that physician-assisted suicide should be allowed. In a rigorous survey of physicians in 1996, less than 20% of physicians reported that they received requests from patients to be euthanized, and less than 5% complied. In 2020, the Oregon Death with Dignity Act data summary revealed that the number of prescriptions for lethal doses of medications increased by 25% since 2019, and have been steadily increasing since 1998. Of patients who received these prescriptions, 66% eventually died from ingesting the medications.

==== Major right to die cases ====
===== Karen Quinlan =====
The right to die movement in the United States began with the case of Karen Quinlan in 1975 and continues to raise bioethical questions about one's quality of life and the legal process of death. Quinlan, 21, lost consciousness after consuming alcohol and tranquilizers at a party. She soon began to experience respiratory problems, which then prevented oxygen from flowing to her brain. That led her to slip into a comatose state in which a respirator and a feeding tube were used to keep her alive and breathing. Quinlan did not have a proxy or living will and had not expressed her wishes if something ever happened to her to those around her, which made it difficult to decide what the next step should be.

Quinlan's parents understood that their daughter would never wake up and that prolonging her life may be more damaging and it would not be of quality life. Her father sought out the right to be Quinlan's legal guardian and petitioned for the removal of the respirator that was keeping her alive. The court, however, argued that the removal of the ventilator, which would lead to Quinlan's death, would be considered unlawful, unnatural, and unethical. Quinlan's lawyer made the counterargument that the removal of the respirator would allow Quinlan to have a natural death, which is natural and ethical. The Quinlans won the court case and were appointed as the legal guardians of their daughter. The respirator was removed in 1976, but Quinlan continued to live without the ventilator until 1985. The case continues to raise bioethical questions of one's quality of life and the legal process of death. It also brings up many important issues that are still being addressed to this day. One of the critical points that the Quinlan case brings up is the patient's right to deny or withdraw treatment. Cases in which the patient rejected or withdrew treatment were then unheard of and went against medical ethics in preserving one's life. Debates on allowing patients the right to self-determination were controversial, and they would be evaluated for the next couple of decades from state to state. The case also brought up whether family members and those who are close to the patient are allowed in the decision-making process. Since Quinlan had no written documentation, voiced no decision, and appointed no proxy, a lengthy legal battle was caused between the Quinlan family and the state in determining Quinlan's best interest and determining if she would want to live or die. That had a significant influence on the use and establishment of advance directives, oral directives, proxies, and living wills.

===== Nancy Cruzan =====
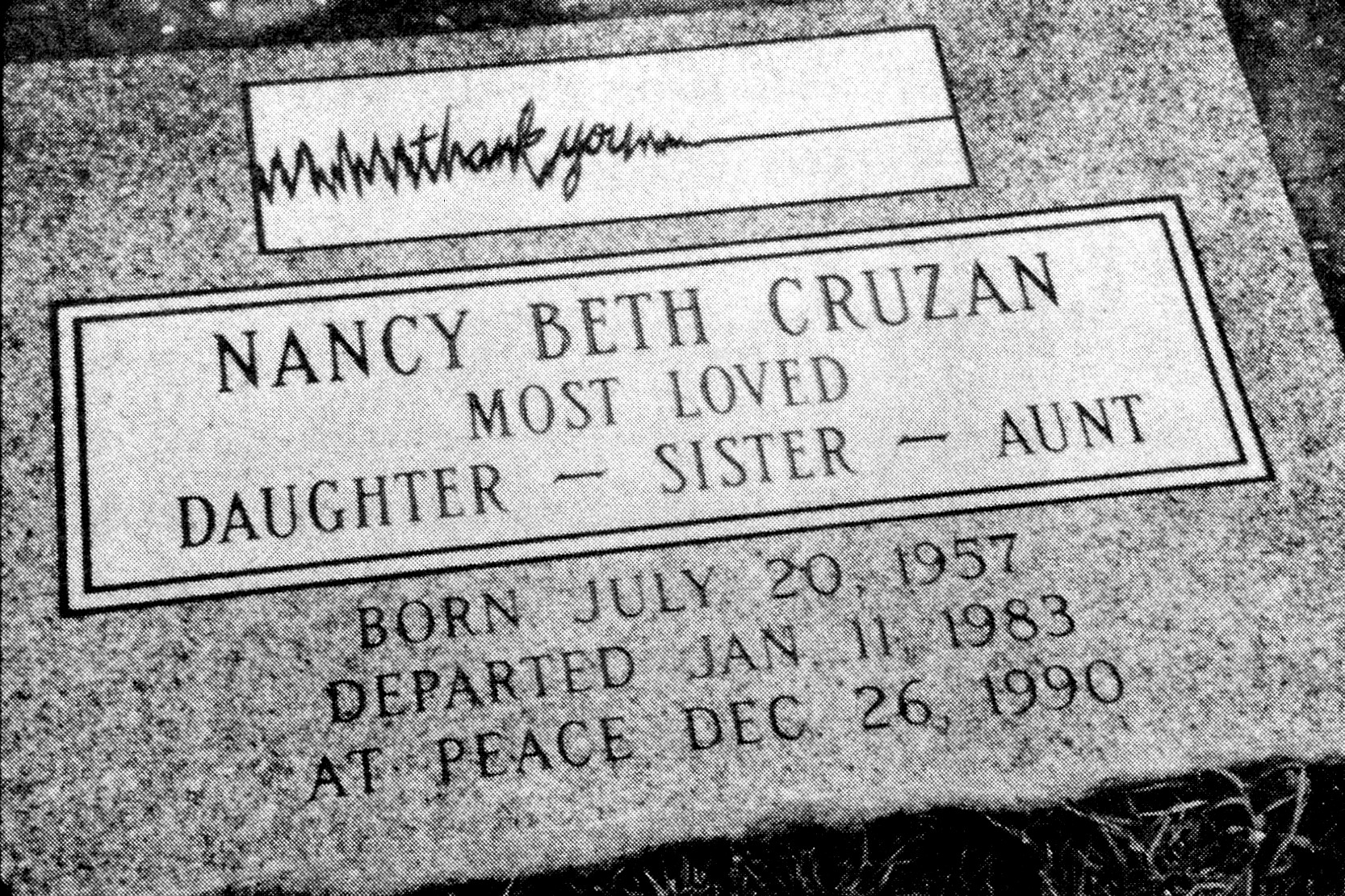
Cruzan's gravestone

Another major case that further propagated the right to die movement and the use of living wills, advance directives and use of a proxy was Cruzan v. Director, Missouri Department of Health. In 1983, Cruzan had a car accident, which left her permanently in a vegetative state. Her status as an adult and lack of an advance directive, living will, or proxy led to a long legal battle for Cruzan's family in petitioning for the removal of her feeding tube, which was keeping her alive since the accident. Cruzan had mentioned to a friend that under no circumstances would she want to continue to live if she were ever in a vegetative state, but this was not a strong enough statement to remove the feeding tube. Eventually, the Cruzan family won the case and had their daughter's tube removed. The case brought great debate if the right to die should be approved from state to state or as a whole nation.

===== Terri Schiavo =====
The Terri Schiavo case occurred between 1990 and 2005. This case was controversial due to a disagreement between Schiavo's immediate family members and her husband. In the Quinlan and Cruzan cases, the family was able to make a unanimous decision on the state of their daughters. Schiavo suffered from a cardiac arrest which led to her collapse and soon after began to have trouble breathing. The lack of oxygen to her brain caused irreversible brain damage, leaving her in a vegetative state and required a feeding tube and ventilator to keep her alive. Schiavo left no advance directive or had a discussion with her parents or husband about what she may have wanted if something were to happen to her. Soon after, her husband was appointed as her legal guardian.

Years later, her husband decided to remove Schiavo's feeding tube since the chances of her waking up were slim to none. Schiavo's family, however, argued against this decision and brought this case to court. The case was very turbulent and occurred over some years and involved the state and its legislators before a decision was made. This brought up bioethical debates on the discontinuation of Schiavo's life vs. allowing her to continue living in a permanent vegetative state. Those who were for preserving Schiavo's life stated that removing the tube would be ethically immoral since they do not know what she would have wanted. They challenged her physical and mental state and stated that she might have some consciousness; thus she deserved to continue living. Those for removing the tube argued for self-determination and that her quality of life was diminished. The Schiavo case is the most recent and significant right to die case that propagates the thought of having an advance directive or living will. It also further looks into other complications that can arise, such as family disagreements, which should have been accounted for when dealing with a right to die case.

See also

- Washington v. Glucksberg
- Vacco v. Quill

==== Legislation ====
As the health of citizens is considered a police power left for individual states to regulate, it was not until 1997 that the US Supreme Court made a ruling on the issue of assisted suicide and one's right to die. That year, the Supreme Court heard two appeals arguing that New York (Vacco v. Quill) and Washington (Washington v. Glucksberg) statutes that made physician-assisted suicide a felony violated the equal protection clause of the Fourteenth Amendment. In a unanimous vote, the Court held that there was no constitutional right to physician-assisted suicide and upheld state bans on assisted suicide. While in New York has maintained statutes banning physician-assisted suicide, the Court's decision also left it open for other states to decide whether they would allow physician-assisted suicide or not.

Since 1994, the following states in the US have passed assisted suicide laws: Oregon (Death with Dignity Act, 1994), Washington (Death with Dignity Act, 2008), Vermont (Patient Choice and Control at the End of Life Act, 2013), California (End of Life Option Act, 2015), Colorado (End of Life Options Act, 2016), District of Columbia (D.C. Death with Dignity Act, 2016), Hawaii (Our Care Our Choice Act, 2018), Maine (Death with Dignity Act, 2019), New Jersey (Aid in Dying for the Terminally Ill Act, 2019), and New Mexico (Elizabeth Whitefield End of Life Options Act, 2021) passed legislation that provides a protocol for the practice of physician-assisted suicide. The law in these states allows terminally ill adult patients to seek lethal medication from their physicians. In 2009, the Montana Supreme Court ruled that nothing in state law prohibits physician-assisted suicide and provides legal protection for physicians in the case that they prescribe lethal medication upon patient request. In California, the governor signed a controversial physician-assisted-suicide bill, the California End of Life Option Act, in October 2015 that passed during a special legislative session intended to address Medi-Cal funding, after it had been defeated during the regular legislative session.

In early 2014, New Mexico Second District Judge Nan Nash ruled that terminally ill patients have the right to aid in dying under the state constitution, i.e., making it legal for a doctor to prescribe a lethal dose of medication to a terminally ill patient. The ultimate decision will be made with the outcome of New Mexico's Attorney General's appeal to the ruling. Organizations have been continuously pushing for the legalization of self-determination in terminally ill patients in states where the right to end one's life is prohibited.

Medical perspective

The American Medical Association (AMA) is the national association that advocates for physicians and provides guidance for the best practices for delivering health care. The AMA is responsible for maintaining the Code of Ethics, which consists of two parts: the Principles of Medical Ethics and Opinions of the AMA's Council on Ethical and Judicial Affairs. The role of physicians in patient's right to die is debated within the medical community, however, the AMA provided an opinion statement on the matter.

Opinion statement regarding physician-assisted suicide

Patients who are terminally ill or suffering from debilitating illnesses may decide that they prefer to die rather than continue suffering. Physicians commit themselves to "do no harm" and by participating in assisted suicide physicians would inherently be causing harm to their patients. Rather than participating in assisted suicide, physicians should provide palliative care to minimize patient suffering. These are recommendations for physicians from the Code of Medical Ethics Opinion 5.7 regarding end of life care:

- Should not abandon a patient once it is determined that a cure is impossible.
- Must respect patient autonomy.
- Must provide good communication and emotional support.
- Must provide appropriate comfort care and adequate pain control.

=== Uruguay ===
In October 2025, with the approval of the so called Dignified Death Bill, Uruguay recognised the right of mentally sound adults in the terminal stage of an incurable and irreversible disease to request euthanasia to be administered by a doctor on their behalf, this procedure is known as active euthanasia.

Any patient who requests to be euthanized will first need to get a doctor’s counsel and approval, and then that of a second doctor independent of the first one or a medical board in case of disagreement between the first two. The patient will then undergo another interview, and finally, they will have to ratify their decision before two witnesses at least one of whom shall not receive any financial benefit due to the death of the declarant.

The physician and other members of the healthcare may validly object to their services under the figure of conscientious objector. In such a case, the healthcare institution will determine who should replace them, always ensuring the provision of the service.

== Religion ==
Religious views on suicide vary in their tolerance and include denial of the right as well as condemnation of the act. Hinduism accepts the right to die for those who are tormented by terminal diseases or those who have no desire, no ambition, and no responsibilities remaining. Death is allowed by non-violent means such as fasting to the point of starvation (Prayopavesa). Jainism has a similar practice named Santhara.

In modern Catholicism, according to Father William J. Byron of the Catholic Digest, "No one can appreciate the unimaginable pain that is the ultimate explanation for such a tragic action. No one, therefore, can judge a person whose choice we cannot fathom, whose life we can remember, but cannot restore, and whose pain we cannot understand. This is how the Church tends to look upon suicide today. Pity, not condemnation, is the response of the Church. Prayers are offered for the deceased. Mass is celebrated. Burial with dignity, in consecrated ground, is provided for one who dies this way".

== See also ==
Initiatives

- Advance Directives Act (Texas)
- Initiative 1000 (Washington)
- Oregon Death with Dignity Act

Groups

- Compassion & Choices of Oregon
- Death with Dignity National Center
- Dignitas
- Exit International
- World Federation of Right to Die Societies
- Final Exit Network

Films

- How to Die in Oregon documentary film
- Right to Die? documentary film
- The Sea Inside drama film
- Whose Life Is It Anyway? drama film

Books

- Final Exit

Individuals

- Elizabeth Bouvia
- Eluana Englaro
- Edward Brongersma
- Betty and George Coumbias
- David Goodall
- Tirhas Habtegiris
- James Harden-Hickey
- Derek Humphry
- Richard Huxtable
- Jack Kevorkian
- Brittany Maynard
- Philip Nitschke
- Haleigh Poutre
- Diane Pretty
- Karen Ann Quinlan
- Sue Rodriguez
- Jo Roman
- Terri Schiavo
- Ramón Sampedro
- Piergiorgio Welby

Other related

- Advocacy of suicide
- Assisted suicide
- Bioethics / Medical ethics
- Bodily integrity
- Coup de grâce
- Do not resuscitate
- End-of-life care
- Euthanasia
- Force feeding
- Free will
- Freedom of choice
- Futile medical care
- Philosophy of suicide
- Right to life
- Letting die
- Liberty
- Living will
- Patient refusal of nutrition and hydration
- Self-ownership
