= Right to life =

Belief that a being should not be killed by another entity

The right to life is the belief that a human (or other animal) has the right to live and, in particular, should not be killed by another entity. The concept of a right to life arises in debates on issues including: capital punishment, with some people seeing it as immoral; abortion, with some considering the killing of a human embryo or fetus immoral; euthanasia, in which the decision to end one's life outside of natural means is seen as incorrect; meat production and consumption, in which the breeding and killing of animals for their meat is seen by some people as an infringement on their rights; and in killings by law enforcement, which are seen by some as inherently disproportionate or excessive. However, individuals may disagree in which of these areas the principle of a right to life might apply.

== Abortion ==
The term "right to life" is used in the abortion debate by those who wish to end the practice of abortion, or at least reduce the frequency of the practice, and in the context of pregnancy, the term right to life was advanced by Pope Pius XII during a 1951 papal encyclical:

Every human being, even the child in the womb, has the right to life directly from God and not from his parents, not from any society or human authority. Therefore, there is no man, no society, no human authority, no science, no "indication" at all whether it be medical, eugenic, social, economic, or moral that may offer or give a valid judicial title for a direct deliberate disposal of an innocent human life

— Pope Pius XII, Address to Midwives on the Nature of Their Profession Papal Encyclical, October 29, 1951.

In 1966 the National Conference of Catholic Bishops (NCCB) asked Fr. James T. McHugh to begin observing trends in abortion reform within the United States. The National Right to Life Committee (NRLC) was founded in 1967 as the Right to Life League to coordinate its state campaigns under the auspices of the National Conference of Catholic Bishops. To appeal to a more broad-based, nonsectarian movement, key Minnesota leaders proposed an organizational model that would separate the NRLC from the direct oversight of the National Conference of Catholic Bishops and by early 1973 NRLC Director Fr. James T. McHugh and his executive assistant, Michael Taylor, proposed a different plan, facilitating the NRLC move toward its independence from the Roman Catholic Church.

=== Ethics and right to life ===
Some utilitarian ethicists argue that the "right to life", where it exists, depends on conditions other than membership of the human species. The philosopher Peter Singer is a notable proponent of this argument. For Singer, the right to life is grounded in the ability to plan and anticipate one's future. This extends the concept to non-human animals, such as other apes, but since the unborn, infants and severely disabled people lack this, he states that abortion, painless infanticide and euthanasia can be "justified" (but are not obligatory) in certain special circumstances, for instance in the case of a disabled infant whose life would be one of suffering.

Bioethicists associated with disability rights and disability studies communities have argued that Singer's epistemology is based on ableist conceptions of disability.

== Capital punishment ==
Opponents of capital punishment argue that it is a violation of the right to life, while its supporters argue that the death penalty is not a violation of the right to life because the right to life should apply with deference to a sense of justice. The opponents believe that capital punishment is the worst violation of human rights, because the right to life is the most important, and capital punishment violates it without necessity and inflicts to the condemned a psychological torture. Human rights activists oppose the death penalty, calling it "cruel, inhuman, and degrading punishment", and Amnesty International considers it to be "the ultimate, irreversible denial of Human Rights".

The United Nations General Assembly has adopted, in 2007, 2008, 2010, 2012, 2014, and 2016 non-binding resolutions calling for a global moratorium on executions, with a view to eventual abolition.

== Killings by law enforcement ==
The International Human Rights Standards for Law Enforcement has created a system whereby it is recognised that international human rights law is binding upon all state actors, and that said state actors must know and be capable of applying international standards for human rights. The right to life is for the most part an inalienable right granted to every human upon the planet, however, there are certain situations in which state actors are required to take drastic action, which can result in civilians being killed by law enforcement agents.

Appropriate occasions for killings by law enforcement are strictly outlined by the International Human Rights Standards for Law Enforcement. Any lethal action taken by law enforcement agents must be taken following a certain set of rules that have been set out in the 'Use of Force' section of the Pocket Book on Human Rights for the Police. The essential tenet of the Pocket Book surrounding the use of lethal force is that all other means of a non-violent nature should be employed initially, followed by proportionately appropriate use of force. Proportionately appropriate use of force can, and will in some circumstances, refer to lethal force if a law enforcement agent genuinely believes that ending the life of one civilian would result in the preservation of his life, or the lives of his fellow civilians, as is outlined in the 'Permissible Circumstances for the Use of Firearms' section of the Pocket Book. The Pocket Book also outlines in the 'Accountability for the Use of Force and Firearms' section that there are stringent measures of accountability in place to maintain integrity within state law enforcement agencies as regards their right to the use of lethal force.

International institutions have outlined when and where law enforcement agents might have the availability of lethal force at their disposal. The International Association of Chiefs of Police have 'Model Policies' which incorporate various pieces of information from leading sources. One of these model policies states that law enforcement agents will engage in reasonable necessary force to efficiently bring a scenario to a conclusion, giving specific thought to both the safety of themselves and other civilians. Law enforcement officers are given the prerogative to engage in department-approved methods to safely bring a conclusion to a scenario and are also given the ability to use issued equipment to resolve issues in scenarios where they are required to protect themselves or others from damage, to bring resistant individuals under control, or to safely conclude unlawful incidents. There is no mention as to what "reasonably necessary" should be interpreted as meaning, but there is reference made to the reasonable man method of determining how one should approach a scenario. However, it has been highlighted through events such as the killing of Michael Brown by Darren Wilson in Ferguson, Missouri, which resulted in public unrest, that there is confusion and debate surrounding the use of firearms and lethal force. The 'Procedure for the Use of Firearms' section provides the process through which law enforcement agents must progress when using firearms. It states that they must identify themselves as a law enforcement agent, issue a clear warning, and give an adequate amount of time for response (providing that time would not likely result in harm being done to the agent or other civilians) before deadly force can be used within the bounds of international law.

While the Pocket Book on Human Rights for the Police outlines the academic circumstances under which law enforcement agents may use lethal force, the literal scenarios in which police killings have occurred are also relevant. Rosenfeld states that there is considerable literature that gives reason to believe that social conditions also have a part to play in how law enforcement killings can occur. Rosenfeld states that there are numerous studies that have been conducted which link law enforcement agents' use of lethal force to the area's rate of violent crime, the size of the non-indigenous population and the socioeconomic position of the community concerned. Appropriating a blanket description of how police killings can occur across the board is difficult given the vast differences in social context from state to state.

Perry, Hall and Hall discuss the phenomena across the United States of America which became highly charged and widely documented in late 2014, referring to the use of lethal force from white police officers on unarmed black male civilians. There is no legal prerogative which gives law enforcement agents the ability to use lethal force based on the race of the person they are dealing with, there is only a legal prerogative to engage in lethal force if there is a reasonable fear for your life or the lives of others. However, the Propublica analysis of federal data on fatal police shootings between 2010 and 2012, showed that young black male civilians were 21 times more likely to be killed by police than young white male civilians. The use of lethal force from law enforcement agents in the United States created widespread feeling amongst US citizens that they were not being protected by the police. The justice system mostly found that these agents acted within the boundaries of the law because the actions of the people who were shot were judged to be sufficiently questionable in character for the police officer to fear for their own life or the lives of others. Coppolo investigated Connecticut law and reported that the use of lethal force must be followed by a report that determines whether the law enforcement agent's lethal force was proportionately necessary in the circumstances. Coppolo also stated that a reasonable lethal response must only be made when there is a reasonable belief that the facts you have been presented with could realistically result in a risk of death or grievous bodily harm.

== Animals ==
In Animal Liberation, Peter Singer writes that the killing of animals for the consumption of their meat should be seen as immoral and a violation of their right to life. He holds that rights should be based on sentience, rather than species membership.

Numerous authors have invoked the argument from marginal cases to argue that animals should have similar moral status to human infants, senile people, the comatose, and cognitively disabled people.

A 2020 survey of around 1800 published English-language philosophers found that 48% said it was permissible to eat animals in ordinary circumstances, while 45% said it was not.

== Euthanasia ==
Those who believe a person should be able to make the decision to end their own life through euthanasia use the argument that persons have a right to choose, while those who oppose the legalization of euthanasia argue so on the grounds that all persons have a right to life, which they interpret as an obligation to live. They are commonly referred to as right-to-lifers.

The European Convention on Human Rights defended the possibility of the existence of a "right to die" through the application of euthanasia and granting the individual the right to choose the method of implementing this type of dying, considering that the latter is one of the parts of the right to life.

== Juridical statements ==
- In 1444, the Poljica Statute declared a right to live "-for nothing existed forever".
- In 1776, the United States Declaration of Independence declared that "all men are created equal, that they are endowed by their Creator with certain unalienable Rights, that among these are Life, Liberty and the pursuit of Happiness".
- In 1948, the Universal Declaration of Human Rights, adopted by the United Nations General Assembly declared in article three:

Everyone has the right to life, liberty and security of person.

- In 1950, the European Convention on Human Rights was adopted by the Council of Europe, declaring a protected human right to life in Article 2. There are exceptions for lawful executions and self-defense, arresting a fleeing suspect, and suppressing riots and insurrections. Since then Protocol 6 of the convention has called for nations to outlaw capital punishment except in time of war or national emergency, and at present this pertains in all countries of the council. Protocol 13 provides for the total abolition of capital punishment, and has been implemented in most member countries of the council.
- In 1966, the International Covenant on Civil and Political Rights was adopted by the United Nations General Assembly.

Every human being has the inherent right to life. This right shall be protected by law. No one shall be arbitrarily deprived of his life.

— Article 6.1 of the International Covenant on Civil and Political Rights

- In 1969, the American Convention on Human Rights was adopted in San José, Costa Rica by many countries in the Western Hemisphere. It is in force in 23 countries.

Every person has the right to have his life respected. This right shall be protected by law and, in general, from the moment of conception. No one shall be arbitrarily deprived of his life.

— Article 4.1 of the American Convention on Human Rights

- In 1982, the Canadian Charter of Rights and Freedoms enshrined that

Everyone has the right to life, liberty and security of the person and the right not to be deprived thereof except in accordance with the principles of fundamental justice.

— Section 7 of the Canadian Charter of Rights and Freedoms

- In 1989, the United Nations General Assembly adopted the Convention on the Rights of the Child (CRC).
- The Basic Law for the Federal Republic of Germany holds the principle of human dignity paramount, even above the right to life.
- The Catholic Church has issued a Charter of the Rights of the Family in which it states that the right to life is directly implied by human dignity.
- Article 21 of the Indian Constitution, 1950, guarantees the right to life to all persons within the territory of India and states: "No person shall be deprived of his right to life and personal liberty except according to procedure established by law." Article 21 confers on every person the fundamental right to life and personal liberty which has become an inexhaustible source of many other rights.

The right to life is considered the most important and first right urged by the European Convention on Human Rights, and it is a right granted to all persons, which makes it necessary in the system of basic human rights and freedoms that this Convention works to protect and preserve.

== Maps ==
| Subject | Map | Legend |
|---|---|---|
| Abortion | | No gestational limit; Gestational limit after the first 17 weeks; Gestational limit in the first 17 weeks; Unclear gestational limit; Legally restricted to cases of: Risk to woman's life, to her health*, rape*, fetal impairment*, or socioeconomic factors; Risk to woman's life, to her health*, rape, or fetal impairment; Risk to woman's life, to her health*, or fetal impairment; Risk to woman's life*, to her health*, or rape; Risk to woman's life or to her health; Risk to woman's life; Illegal with no exceptions; No information; * Does not apply to some countries in that category. |
| Euthanasia | | Active voluntary euthanasia legal (Belgium, Canada, Colombia, Ecuador, Luxembourg, the Netherlands, New Zealand, Portugal, (Note: Portugal: Law not yet in force, awaits regulation to be implemented. The law legalizing euthanasia, Law n.º 22/2023, of 22 May, states in Article 31 that the regulation must be approved within 90 days of the publishing of the law, which would have been 23 August 2023. However, the regulation has not yet been approved by the government. On 24 November 2023, the Ministry of Health stated that the regulation of the law would be the responsibility of the new government elected in the 10 March 2024 elections. The law, according to its Article 34, will only enter into force 30 days after the regulation is published.) Spain, Uruguay and the Australian states of New South Wales, Queensland, South Australia, Tasmania, Victoria and Western Australia); Passive euthanasia legal (refusal of treatment/withdrawal of life support) Active euthanasia illegal, passive euthanasia not legislated or regulated All forms of euthanasia illegal |
| Capital punishment | | Maintain the death penalty in both law and practice; Abolished in practice (no execution in over 10 years and under a moratorium); Abolished in law, except in exceptional circumstances, such as war; Completely abolished |
| Cattle slaughter | | |

== See also ==
- Abortion law
- Abortion rights
- Anti-abortion
- Anti-abortion feminism
- Argument from marginal cases
- Baby K
- Bodily integrity
- Bioethics
- Biocentrism (ethics)
- Consistent life ethic
- Culture of life
- Declaration of the Rights of Man and of the Citizen
- Deontology
- Fetal rights
- Foeticide
- Human dignity
- Life, Liberty and the pursuit of Happiness
- Life unworthy of life
- Moral agency
- Moral rights
- Moral skepticism
- National Right to Life Committee
- Haleigh Poutre
- Nonkilling
- Personhood
- Quality of life
- Reverence for Life
- Rights
- Right to die
- Sanctity of life
- Sentience
- Speciesism
- Terri Schiavo
