= National Association of Catholic Families =

Organization for Roman Catholic families

The National Association of Catholic Families is a lay organisation that aims to offer mutual support for Roman Catholic families in maintaining a Catholic faith in "a culture which is now at war with our values".

The NACF sees itself as an attempt to bear witness to families, it is inspired by the writings of Pope John Paul II and it bases its work on a number of documents among them, Familiaris consortio, the Catholic Church's Charter of the Rights of the Family and Evangelium Vitae.

The fraternity is one of the founding members of the international Committee of the Pilgrimage of the Black Madonna of Czestochowa, which in 2012 organized a tour that claimed to go "from Ocean to Ocean, from the Pacific at Vladivostok to Fatima.

The NACF has branches in the United Kingdom (where it is based), Australia, the United States and India. The NACF is primarily a social movement, although its loyalty to the Catholic Church's teachings and its focus on family values often leads to a more conservative political and religious outlook.

At 2018, the president of the National Association of Catholic Families was Dr. Thomas Ward.
