= Prayopavesa =

Hindu practice of suicide by fasting

Prayopavesa (Sanskrit: प्रायोपवेशनम्, prāyopaveśanam, lit. 'resolving to die through fasting') is a practice in Hinduism that denotes the death by fasting of a person who has no desire or ambition left, and no responsibilities remaining in life. It is also allowed in cases of terminal disease or great disability. A similar practice exists in Jainism, termed Santhara.

== Conditions and rules ==
Performing prayopavesa is bound by very strict regulations. Only a person who has no desire or ambition left, and no responsibilities remaining in life, is entitled to perform it. The decision to do so must be publicly declared well in advance. Ancient lawmakers stipulated the conditions that allow prayopavesa; they are one's inability to perform normal bodily purification, death appears imminent or the condition is so bad that life's pleasures are nil, and the action is done under community regulation.

== Examples ==
Parikshit is described to have observed the prayopavesa when the Bhagavata Purana was narrated to him by the sage Shuka, son of Vyasa.

In 1982, Acharya Vinoba Bhave (spiritual successor of Mahatma Gandhi) died by prayopavesa.

On 11 January 1997 Swami Nirmalananda subjected himself to prayopavesa.

In October 2001, Satguru Sivaya Subramuniyaswami subjected himself to prayopavesa. Subramuniyaswami was diagnosed to be suffering from terminal intestinal cancer. He later died on the 32nd day of his fast on November 12.

== See also ==
- Catharist endura
- Euthanasia
- Hunger strike
- Right to die
- Sallekhana
- Sokushinbutsu
