= Sean Davison =

South African scientist and author (born 1962)

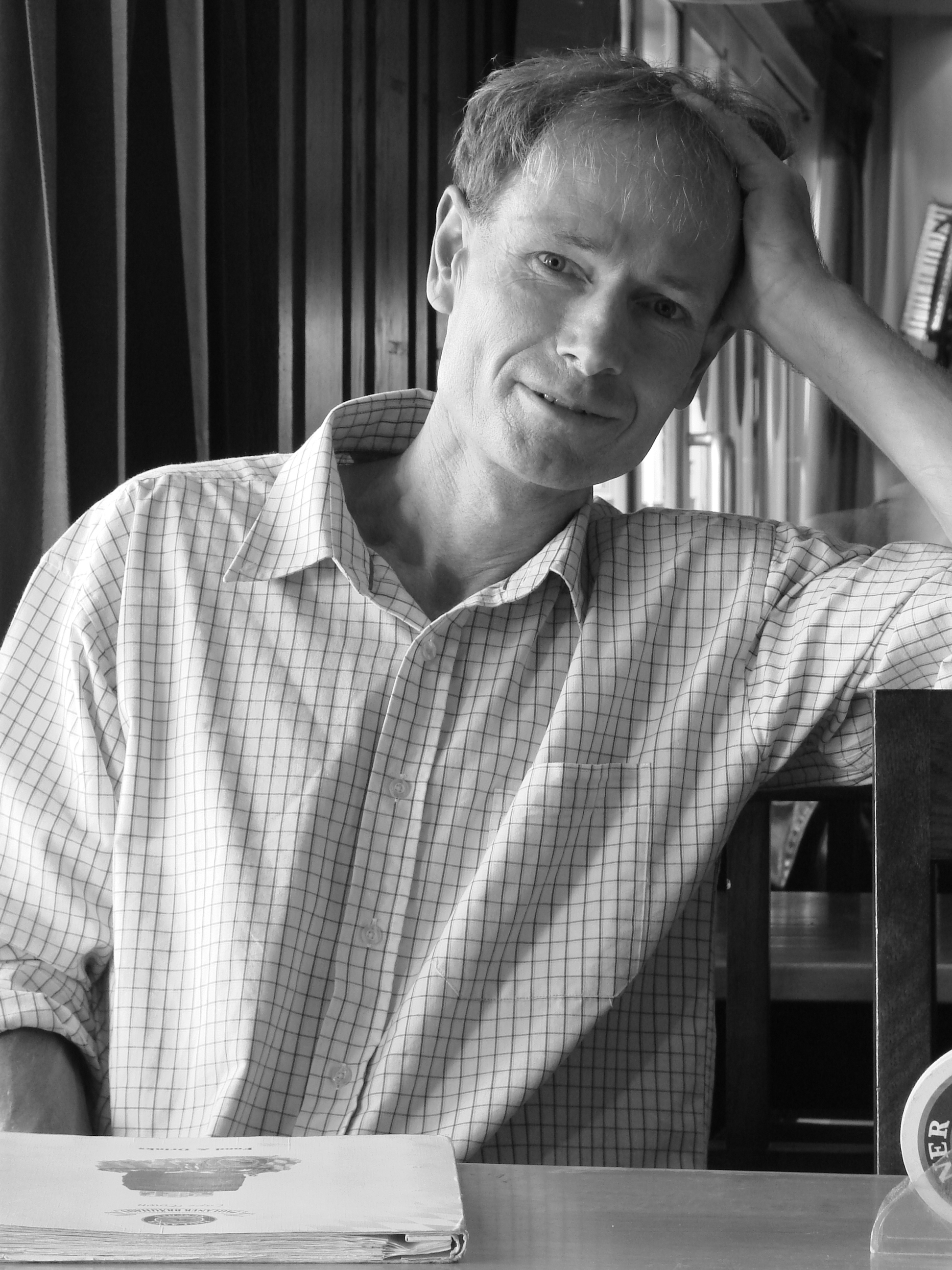
- Davison in 2008
- Born: 1962 (age 63–64); Auckland, New Zealand
- Citizenship: New Zealand and South Africa
- Education: University of Otago, New Zealand (PhD); University of Cape Town, South Africa (Post-doc)
- Known for: Influencing euthanasia debate worldwide
- Scientific career
- Fields: DNA forensics, Virology, Cognitive Neuroscience

Sean Davison is a New Zealand-born South African scientist and author. In 2010 he was arrested in New Zealand and charged with the attempted murder of his terminally-ill mother, Dr. Patricia Ferguson. As a result of his arrest and High Court trial, he became an international campaigner for changes to the law regarding assisted dying under legally defined criteria. He is the founder and director of the pro-euthanasia organisation Dignity South Africa and served for five years as president of the World Federation of Right-to-Die Societies. Both organisations support the decriminalisation of voluntary euthanasia.

In 2019 Davison was convicted of murder for assisting the suicide of three paralyzed men in South Africa, In 2024 he was arrested in England for the assisted suicide of an elderly woman he accompanied to Switzerland to have a legal assisted death. The police are investigating 29 similar charges.

For 18 months during 2023 and 2024 Davison served as a director of Exit International and was involved with the development of the Sarco suicide pod. He subsequently became associated with Pegasos, a voluntary assisted dying organisation in Switzerland.

== Early life and career ==
Born to an Irish father and British mother in Auckland, New Zealand, Sean Davison was raised in Hokitika, on the west coast of New Zealand. He obtained a PhD in microbiology from the University of Otago (New Zealand) in 1990. Following the completion of his PhD studies, he moved to South Africa and became a citizen of that country. He carried out post-doctoral research studies at the University of Cape Town (1991–93), before accepting an academic post at the University of the Western Cape where he established a molecular virology and a DNA forensics laboratory. The DNA forensics lab had notable success in identifying the remains of anti-apartheid activists, who were buried in mass graves by the apartheid-era police. Davison's lab has also developed a DNA rape kit for identifying individual perpetrators in cases where there is more than one rapist.

Davison's research interests include cognitive neuroscience where he demonstrated that suicide can be considered a rational thought in certain circumstances.

Davison co-founded and is director of the Innocence Project: South Africa, an organisation supporting the exoneration of prisoners incarcerated for crimes they did not commit, proven via the use of DNA testing of biological material from the historical crime scenes.

== Personal life ==
Davison is married to Rayne Pan with whom he has had three children.

In 2006 Davison's mother, Patricia Ferguson, was terminally ill with secondary cancer. Davison left South Africa and traveled to New Zealand to care for her during her final months. Rather than face a prolonged and painful death from cancer, his mother decided to go on a hunger strike to end her life by inanition. After 35 days of not eating, Davison's mother was unable to move any part of her body and was experiencing the pain she had gone on a hunger strike to avoid. At this point, she pleaded with him to help her to die, and he ultimately conceded, giving her a lethal dose of crushed morphine tablets mixed with water.

Davison wrote a book describing the three months he spent with his mother, but excluding the specifics of how he assisted his mother to die. However, an early manuscript that included Davison's participation in his mother's death, found its way to the police in New Zealand. It was widely reported that his eldest sister was responsible for informing the police of Davison's actions. As a consequence, Davison was arrested and charged with the attempted murder of his mother in September 2010.

Although Davison lived and worked in Cape Town, he was faced with waiting a year for his trial to commence in New Zealand. Archbishop Desmond Tutu wrote to the New Zealand High Court, vouching for Davison's character and pleading with the court to allow Davison to return to his family in South Africa until the date of his trial. The court agreed to this request, setting a legal precedent in New Zealand, due to the seriousness of the offence.

In September 2011, the trial took place in Dunedin, New Zealand. Davison accepted a plea bargain agreement, pleading guilty to assisted suicide. Prior to the judge's ruling, Archbishop Desmond Tutu again wrote to Judge Christine French, pleading for a lenient sentence. She acknowledged that Archbishop Tutu's request impressed her considerably and concluded that Davison's actions were driven by love and compassion. Davison was sentenced to five months' home detention in New Zealand.

Following his conviction he said he had no regrets in assisting his mother to die; he also said he hoped his trial would help bring about a law change on euthanasia.

During Davison's time on home detention he received death threats, including a brick thrown through his house of detention. Davison arranged for the note that was attached to the brick to be sent to his DNA forensics laboratory in South Africa in an attempt to DNA profile the perpetrator who had handled it. It was later discovered that the court had unknowingly made his house arrest location available online to the public, and he was subsequently moved to a secret location.

On returning to his home in South Africa, Davison said he believed doctors had been helping patients to die since the beginning of humanity.

Several television documentaries were made about Davison's story, including a feature-length documentary that received critical acclaim.

In September 2018 Davison was arrested in South Africa and charged with the murder of his quadriplegic friend Anrich Burger in 2013. Davison told the court that he was not guilty of any crime. He was granted bail even though the prosecution indicated there would be further murder charges. Following Davison's arrest Archbishop Desmond Tutu expressed his support for him once again. Anrich Burger was a quadriplegic as the result of a motor vehicle accident and had publicly stated that he was seeking an assisted suicide. Following Burgers death, and media speculation of Davison's involvement, Davison publicly admitted he assisted his friend's suicide. He also declared that he would not be willing to assist in euthanasia again.

In November 2018 Davison was charged with a second murder, that of Justin Varian in 2015. Justin Varian was terminally ill with motor neuron disease and had publicly stated his desire to end his life because of his unbearable suffering. At that time there was media speculation that Davison was involved in planning Varian's death. However, Davison denied any involvement in it, stating that "assisted suicide is a world I don't want to be in".

In April 2019 Davison was charged with a third murder, that of Richard Holland who died in December 2015. Davison again denied the charges and the case was moved to the Western Cape High Court. Richard Holland was a popular South African triathlete who represented his country on the 2007 World Championships. As a result of the spinal injuries from being knocked off his bicycle he developed locked-in syndrome and was only able to move a thumb and one eyelid. Although in court Davison denied all three murder charges he faced, he never made any public comment, however his wife disclosed he had helped the three men to die out of compassion, and she described the stress it brought to him and their family.

In June 2019 Davison entered a plea bargain with the court in South Africa and pleaded guilty to all three murder charges he faced, in exchange he was sentenced to three years' house arrest at his home in Cape Town. It was stated in court that none of the families of the men Davison assisted wanted him to go to prison. Two of the families made public statements supporting Davison's actions in helping their family member to die. The only reported comment Davison made following his acceptance of the plea bargain was to say: "My children want a father not a martyr".

In addition to house arrest the court sentenced Davison to 576 hours of correctional supervision. He spent this time cleaning toilets in prison cells and government offices. This type of punishment was compared to that carried out during Mao's Cultural Revolution in China. Davison was also banned from speaking to the media for the duration of his house arrest sentence.

Davison's arrest and sentence generated considerable public discussion in South Africa which was generally supportive of what he had done, and his decision to plead guilty to murder to avoid the risk of a lengthy prison sentence.

In August 2020, Davison's murder convictions in South Africa were transferred to New Zealand. In a subsequent Medical Science Council tribunal hearing he was convicted of professional misconduct and struck off the New Zealand medical register. Davison said he could not understand why helping three men to end their unbearable suffering made him unfit to work as a medical scientist in New Zealand.

In October 2020 New Zealand held a national referendum on the End of Life Choices bill that had been approved by parliament. This binding referendum resulted in 65% support for the End of Life Choices bill and lead to assisted suicide being legalised for the terminally ill in New Zealand. This led to calls for those convicted of helping dying family members to end their lives to be pardoned. The Minister of Justice advised Davison to seek a Royal pardon from the Queen's representative in New Zealand.

In June 2022, Davison's house arrest sentence finished and he made his first public statement from the steps of the Cape Town high court, declaring: ‘I have done my time but I did not commit a crime’. He subsequently gave interviews describing the circumstances behind the murder convictions he received.

In 2025, Davison was arrested by police officers in the United Kingdom in connection with 29 deaths, including the death of a 79 year old woman. He was released on bail, and it is unclear at the time of writing whether a prosecutorial decision has been taken. Some of the conditions of his bail including restrictions on working with Pegasos and similar organisations and restrictions on speaking to the media.

== Right-to-die campaign ==
In 2012 Davison founded the organisation DignitySA, which seeks a law change to allow for voluntary euthanasia for those suffering near the end of their lives. In April 2015, DignitySA succeeded in taking the plea for an assisted death from a terminally-ill man, Robin Stransham-Ford, to the High Court. In an immediate action, Judge Fabricious granted Stransham-Ford an assisted death via lethal injection by a doctor. Although Stransham-Ford died of natural causes on same day the High Court decision was made and did not receive a physician-assisted death, the court ruling set a legal precedent in South Africa. The Stransham-Ford High Court ruling was subsequently overturned by the Supreme Court of Appeal in December 2016. At this writing, August 2022, DignitySA is sponsoring a new court action in South Africa, representing all terminally-ill people in the country.

At the World Federation of Right-to-Die Societies bi-annual conference in Chicago 2014, Davison was elected to the board of this organisation, and two years later became president at its conference in Amsterdam and served in that position for five years. He now plays an active role in the campaigns around the world.

Davison was closely associated with Archbishop Tutu's stated position on supporting assisted dying, and on expressing his own wish to have an assisted death if necessary.

At the end of his house arrest sentence, Davison said he would continue campaigning for a law change in Archbishop Tutu's honour.

== Books ==
Davison's first book Before We Say Goodbye, describes the three months he spent with his mother prior to her death.

In 2015, his second book The Last Waltz: Love, Death & Betrayal, which included his New Zealand court trial was published.

In 2022, after finishing his house arrest sentence in South Africa, Davison published his third book, The Price of Mercy, which tells the backstory of his three murder convictions.
