= Anita Silvers =

American philosopher (1940–2019)

Anita Silvers (1 November 1940 – 14 March 2019) was an American philosopher, focusing on medical ethics, bioethics, feminism, disability studies, philosophy of law, and social and political philosophy. She "was a leading voice in the interpretation of the Americans With Disabilities Act, arguing that disability rights should be viewed the same as other civil rights and not as an accommodation or as a social safety net issue".

== Biography ==
As a child, Silvers contracted polio and spent a year in an iron lung, leaving her with partial quadriplegia. She attended The Wheatley School, Old Westbury, NY and was in 1958 salutatorian of the new school’s first graduating class. Silvers received her B.A. in 1962 from Sarah Lawrence College, and her PhD in Philosophy in 1967 from Johns Hopkins University.

Silvers was a professor in, and former chair of, the Department of Philosophy at San Francisco State University, having been on the faculty from 1967. In 1980, she was appointed by President Jimmy Carter to serve on the National Council for the Humanities, the governing board of the National Endowment for the Humanities. In 2009, she was awarded the Quinn Prize for her service to the profession from the American Philosophical Association (APA) the first time this award was granted to a faculty member of a non-research-intensive university. In 2013, she was awarded the Lebowitz Prize by the American Philosophical Association and Phi Beta Kappa society. In 2017, she was awarded the California State University (CSU) Wang Family Excellence Award.

Her 1988 book Disability. Difference. Discrimination: Perspectives on Justice in Bioethics and Public Policy (co-authored with David Wasserman and Mary Mahowald) is widely cited in legal affairs.
