= Paul M. Gahlinger =

American physician

Paul M. Gahlinger

Paul M. Gahlinger, (born in Green Bay, Wisconsin) is an American scientist, physician, and author. His books include Computer Programs for Epidemiologic Analysis (see Winpepi), Northern Manitoba from Forest to Tundra, The Cockpit, Illegal Drugs, Health for Pilots, Drugs and Justice, and The Medical Tourism Travel Guide.

== Biography ==
=== Early life ===
Gahlinger is the son of Anton Josef Gahlinger (1918–1959) and Margrit Rosa (1917–2007), both of whom were citizens of Switzerland. His father was a career military man who commanded the Swiss cavalry in the 1940s and later served as the Captain of the Swiss Guards under Pope Pius XI and Pope Pius XII. The family subsequently emigrated to Canada, where his father bought a produce farm. The father's early death plunged the family into poverty. Gahlinger left school at age 14 to become a farm worker, and later worked underground at Giant Mine gold mine near Yellowknife in the Canadian Northwest Territories and was a logger for MacMillan Bloedel Limited on Vancouver Island in British Columbia.

At age 20, he gained entry to college despite lacking a high school education or diploma. He eventually achieved a B.A. in philosophy from Trent University, an M.A. in anthropology from the University of Manitoba, a PhD in anthropology from the University of Connecticut, an M.P.H. with a concentration in epidemiology from the University of California, Berkeley and his M.D. from the University of California, Davis School of Medicine.

Gahlinger is a citizen of Switzerland, Canada, and the United States. In 1992, he attained notoriety for his record-breaking flight in a small airplane from California to Egypt (described in The Cockpit).

=== Career ===
In 1996, Gahlinger became Chief Medical Officer of Johnston Atoll, a chemical weapons demilitarization site in the mid-Pacific. Under his stewardship, the island obtained JCAHO (Joint Commission) and ISO-9000 accreditation and certification by the Chemical Weapons Convention for health care.

In 2004 Gahlinger wrote the textbook Illegal Drugs: A Complete Guide to Their History, Chemistry, Use and Abuse, a reference on illegal drugs.

== Awards ==
In 1984, he was awarded the American Association for the Advancement of Science prize in Philosophy of Science for his paper, "The Assignation of Cause" arguing that causality is an operational construct that cannot be determined empirically.

In 1997, he was awarded a medal of distinguished service by the United States Army, Defence Special Weapons, for his development of chemical weapons safety programs.

In 2001, he was elected to Fellow and Master of the American College of Occupational and Environmental Medicine.

== Works ==
- 1993 (with JH Abramson) Computer Programs for Epidemiologic Analysis Honolulu: Makapuu Medical Press.
- 1995 Northern Manitoba from Forest to Tundra Lucan, Canada: G.B. Communications.
- 2000 The Cockpit: A Flight of Escape and Discovery Salt Lake City: Sagebrush Press. (memoir)
- 2001 Illegal Drugs: A Complete Guide to Their History, Chemistry, Use and Abuse Salt Lake City: Sagebrush Press.
- 2002 Health for Pilots: A Complete Guide to FAA Medical Certification and Self-Care Salt Lake City: Sagebrush Press.
- 2007 (with Drugs and Justice Working Group) Drugs and Justice: Seeking a Consistent, Coherent, Comprehensive View New York: Oxford University Press.
- 2008 The Medical Tourism Travel Guide: Your Complete Reference to Top-Quality, Low-Cost Dental, Cosmetic, Medical Care & Surgery Overseas North Branch, MN: Sunrise River Press.
