= Frank Charters =

English cricketer

Personal information
- Full name: Frank Henry Charters
- Born: 17 January 1884; Plymouth, Devon, England
- Died: 25 January 1953 (aged 69); Boscombe, Hampshire, England
- Batting: Right-handed

Domestic team information
- Years: Team
- 1913: Hampshire

Career statistics
Competition	First-class
Matches	1
Runs scored	14
Batting average	7.00
100s/50s	–/–
Top score	9
Catches/stumpings	–/–
- Source: Cricinfo, 7 January 2010

Frank Henry Charters (17 January 1884 — 25 January 1953) was an English first-class cricketer.

Charters was born in Plymouth in January 1884. He made a single appearance in first-class cricket for Hampshire in the 1913 County Championship against Derbyshire at Southampton. Batting twice in the match, he was dismissed for 9 runs in Hampshire's first innings by Thomas Forrester, while in their second innings he was dismissed for 5 runs by Arnold Warren. Charters died in Boscombe in January 1953.
