= Carter v Canada (AG) =

Decision of the Supreme Court of Canada

Carter v Canada (Attorney General)
- Supreme Court of Canada

Hearing: October 15, 2014 Judgment: February 6, 2015
- Citations: 2015 SCC 5, [2015] 1 SCR 331
- Docket No.: S112688
- Prior history: On appeal from the Court of Appeal for British Columbia
- Ruling: Appeal allowed

Holding
- Criminal prohibition of assisted suicide violates the Charter.

Court membership
- Chief Justice: Beverley McLachlin; Puisne Justices: Rosalie Abella, Marshall Rothstein, Thomas Cromwell, Michael Moldaver, Andromache Karakatsanis, Richard Wagner, Clément Gascon

Reasons given
- Unanimous reasons by: The Court

Laws applied
- Canadian Charter of Rights and Freedoms, s 7 Criminal Code, ss 14, 241(b)

Carter v Canada (AG), 2015 SCC 5, is a landmark Supreme Court of Canada decision where the prohibition of assisted suicide was challenged as contrary to the Canadian Charter of Rights and Freedoms ("Charter") by several parties, including the family of Kay Carter, a woman suffering from degenerative spinal stenosis, and Gloria Taylor, a woman suffering from amyotrophic lateral sclerosis ("ALS"). In a unanimous decision on February 6, 2015, the Court struck down the provision in the Criminal Code, thereby giving Canadian adults who are mentally competent and suffering intolerably and enduringly the right to a doctor's assistance in dying. This ruling overturned the Supreme Court's 1993 ruling in Rodriguez v British Columbia (AG), which had denied a right to assisted suicide.

The court suspended its ruling for 12 months, with the decision taking effect in 2016, to give the federal government enough time to amend its laws. In January 2016, the court granted an additional four-month extension to its ruling suspension to allow time for the newly elected federal Liberal government to consult with Canadians on drafting a law to comply with the ruling. As an interim measure, it also ruled that provincial courts could approve applications for euthanasia until the new law passed.

== Background ==
In 1972, the Canadian government repealed the Criminal Code provision prohibiting suicide. However, 241(b) of the Criminal Code provided that everyone who aids or abets a person in committing suicide commits an indictable offence, and section 14 stated that no person may consent to death being inflicted on them. The Supreme Court denied a right to assisted suicide in their 1993 ruling Rodriguez v British Columbia (AG), upholding the constitutionality of the prohibitions based upon a thin evidentiary record.

In April 2011, the British Columbia Civil Liberties Association ("BCCLA") filed a lawsuit challenging both section 14 and section 241(b) of Criminal Code (law that prohibits aiding a person to commit suicide), claiming they violated sections 7 (the right to "life, liberty, and security of the person) and 15(1) of the Charter (equality).

The case was heard at the Supreme Court of British Columbia, which ruled in favour of the BCCLA in June 2012. The federal government appealed the ruling to the Court of Appeal for British Columbia, which overturned the ruling in a 2–1 decision in October 2013. The BCCLA then filed a leave to appeal to the Supreme Court of Canada.

== Reasons of the Court ==
The Court framed the issue at bar thus:

[1] It is a crime in Canada to assist another person in ending her own life. As a result, people who are grievously and irremediably ill cannot seek a physician's assistance in dying and may be condemned to a life of severe and intolerable suffering. A person facing this prospect has two options: she can take her own life prematurely, often by violent or dangerous means, or she can suffer until she dies from natural causes. The choice is cruel.

The Court found that section 241(b) and section 14 of the Criminal Code had a permissible object, identified as "not, broadly, to preserve life whatever the circumstances, but more specifically to protect vulnerable persons from being induced to commit suicide at a time of weakness." According to the Court, however, the relevant sections were overbroad in catching cases that fell outside of the object. Thus, the sections unjustifiably infringed section 7 of the Charter; furthermore, this violation was not saved by operation of section 1.

=== Stare decisis ===
The Court found that the trial judge was not bound by the Supreme Court's 1993 decision in Rodriguez v British Columbia (AG), instead holding that stare decisis is "not a straitjacket that condemns the law to stasis". The Court expanded on their discussion of the issue in Canada (AG) v Bedford by ruling trial judges may reconsider the decisions of higher courts if there is a new legal issue at bar, and if circumstances or evidence have "fundamentally shift[ed] the parameters of the debate". The Court found that the section 7 legal issues raised in the case at bar differed from those in Rodriguez, noting in particular the development of the overbreadth and gross disproportionality principles since 1993. The court also determined that the trial judge was entitled to consider the different "matrix of legislative and social facts" that had arisen since Rodriguez.

=== Division of powers ===
The Court affirmed that section 241(b) of the Criminal Code fell within the federal government's section 91(27) criminal law power. Echoing their decision in Canada (AG) v PHS Community Services Society, the Court dismissed the appellants' argument that section 241(b) lay within the core of the provincial section 92 powers. Interjurisdictional immunity could not prevent the federal government from enacting the legislation, since the proposed core of the provincial health powers was overly vague. The Court reaffirmed that health is an area of concurrent jurisdiction, allowing both the federal and provincial legislatures to legislate in the area.

== Public reaction and planned implementation ==
The decision was well received by many, but characterized as judicial activism by others. The BCCLA, appellants at the Supreme Court, were "overjoyed" by the ruling, holding that "physician-assisted dying will now be recognized for what it is—a medical service". The day of the decision, Andrew Coyne wrote in his National Post column that the Court was being eerily complacent about ramifications of its decision. He also argued that the decision signaled the death of judicial restraint in Canada. Former politician Stockwell Day was particularly critical of the Court, saying, "[I]f you want to write laws, you should run for office." In an op-ed published on Canadian Broadcasting Corporation's website, he called for a nationwide debate concerning assisted-suicide legislation. In response to Carter, Conrad Black argued politicians should invoke the notwithstanding clause to send a message to the court that Parliament is supreme.

The February 2015 Supreme Court decision in Carter v Canada (AG) limits physician-assisted suicides to "a competent adult person who clearly consents to the termination of life and has a grievous and irremediable medical condition, including an illness, disease or disability, that causes enduring suffering that is intolerable to the individual in the circumstances of his or her condition". The ruling was suspended for 12 months to allow the Canadian parliament to draft a new, constitutional law to replace the existing one.

The Canadian Medical Association ("CMA") reported that not all doctors were willing to help a patient die. However, the belief in late 2015 was that no physician would be forced to do so but the CMA was offering educational sessions to members as to the process that would be used.

Specifically the Supreme Court held that the current legislation was overbroad in that it prohibits "physician‑assisted death for a competent adult person who (1) clearly consents to the termination of life and (2) has a grievous and irremediable medical condition (including an illness, disease or disability) that causes enduring suffering that is intolerable to the individual in the circumstances of his or her condition."

The government subsequently requested a six-month extension for implementation; the arguments for this request were scheduled to be heard by the Supreme Court in January 2016.

The court decision includes a requirement that there must be stringent limits that are "scrupulously monitored." This will require the death certificate to be completed by an independent medical examiner, not the treating physician, to ensure the accuracy of reporting the cause of death.

== Subsequent legislative history ==
After a lengthy delay, the House of Commons passed a Bill (C-14) in mid-June 2016 that would allow for doctor-assisted suicide in the case of a terminal illness. The bill was then debated in the Senate. Initially, the Senate amended the bill, expanding the right to die. However, when it became apparent that the elected House of Commons would not accept the amendment, a final vote was held on 17 June 2016. At that time, a majority agreed with the restrictive wording provided by the House of Commons indicating that "only patients suffering from incurable illness whose natural death is 'reasonably foreseeable' are eligible for a medically assisted death," as summarized by the Toronto Star. Critics of the Bill indicate that the Carter decision was broader, including desperately ill individuals and not only those who are terminally ill or near death. The House of Commons did accept a few Senate amendments, such as requiring that patients be counselled about alternatives, including palliative care and barring beneficiaries from acting in the euthanasia. The bill was given Royal assent the same day.

Senators such as Serge Joyal who disagree with the restrictive wording believe that one of the provinces should refer the issue to its Court of Appeal for an opinion; this tactic would help to move the process along and would preclude the need for individuals to proceed with a very expensive appeal process.

== See also ==
- List of Supreme Court of Canada cases (McLachlin Court)
- Suicide legislation
- Euthanasia in Canada
- 2015 reasons of the Supreme Court of Canada
- Death
