= Gloria Taylor (patient) =

Canadian activist

Gloria Taylor (March 30, 1948 – October 4, 2012) was a Canadian who was an advocate of medically-assisted dying and suffered from Amyotrophic lateral sclerosis (ALS), also known as Lou Gehrig's disease. Taylor began to experience the early symptoms of ALS in 2003. A neurologist diagnosed her disease in 2009.

On June 29, 2011, Taylor filed an application with the Supreme Court of British Columbia asking to be added as a plaintiff in the BC Civil Liberties Association's (BCCLA) death with dignity lawsuit. The BCCLA had filed the lawsuit in April 2011 to challenge the laws that make it a criminal offense to assist seriously and incurably ill individuals to die with dignity. The legal challenge seeks to allow seriously and incurably ill, mentally competent adults the right to receive medical assistance to hasten death under certain specific safeguards. This case is known as Carter v Canada (AG).

== Life ==
Taylor was a postal worker, residential care worker, motorbike enthusiast and health advocate. She was born in Trail, British Columbia and raised in Castlegar. She lived most of her adult life in Westbank. Her mother was a former hospice coordinator and volunteer.

After Taylor was diagnosed with ALS, Taylor founded a Kelowna support group for people living with ALS and she was actively involved in raising money for groups that support people who are living with ALS and their caregivers.

== Dying with Dignity Charter Challenge ==
Taylor, the BCCLA, and the co-plaintiffs in the case argue that Criminal Code provisions against physician assisted-dying are unconstitutional because they deny individuals the right to have control over choices that are fundamental to their physical, emotional and psychological dignity and restrict the liberty of physicians to deliver end of life care to incurably ill patients.

The plaintiffs believe that every Canadian should have the choice to have what they consider to be a good death, including the option of a medically assisted death for seriously and incurably ill, mentally competent adults. Without a change in the law, seriously ill individuals will continue to suffer against their wishes at the end of life, without the choice and dignity that they deserve. The group argues that the prohibition of assisted dying violates Section 15 of the Canadian Charter of Rights and Freedoms because it discriminates against people with degenerative diseases who have no physical means to end their lives without assistance. They also argued the ban violates their Section 7 right to life because, if they do want to end their suffering, they would have to do so earlier than they might otherwise want, before they lose the capacity to act.

Justice Lynn Smith suspended her decision for one year, to allow the federal government to change the law to exempt physicians from criminal prosecution; but explicitly exempted Taylor from that suspension. The Harper government appealed the decision.

Taylor’s dream of legal change for herself and all Canadians was realized in June when the B.C. Supreme Court ruled that the right to die with dignity is protected by the Charter of Rights and Freedoms, and granted Taylor a personal exemption allowing her the right to seek a physician-assisted death. The case was a major victory for choice and individual rights at the end of life.

Mme Justice Jo-Ann Prowse of the BC Court of Appeal ruled against the federal government on August 10, 2012 and in favour of Taylor's personal exemption, saying that revoking Taylor's exemption would cause irreparable harm to Taylor, which outweighs the federal government's interests. This exemption allows Taylor to seek doctor-assisted suicide under certain conditions. The decision can be found here.

== Death ==
On October 4, 2012, Taylor died as a result of a severe infection resulting from a perforated colon. Due to the acute nature and brief course of her illness from the infection, Taylor did not need to seek the assistance of a physician to end her life. Taylor died in hospital, with her mother and a close friend by her side.

== Related ==
- Rodriguez v. British Columbia (Attorney General)
- Carter v. Attorney General of Canada
