= Rodriguez v British Columbia (AG) =

- Supreme Court of Canada

Hearing: May 20, 1993 Judgment: September 30, 1993
- Full case name: Sue Rodriguez v The Attorney General of Canada and the Attorney General of British Columbia
- Citations: [1993] 3 SCR 519, 107 DLR (4th) 342, 1993 CanLII 75
- Docket No.: 23476
- Prior history: On appeal from the Court of Appeal for British Columbia
- Ruling: Appeal dismissed

Holding
- Criminal prohibition of assisted suicide does not violate the Charter.

Court membership
- Chief Justice: Antonio Lamer; Puisne Justices: Gérard La Forest, Claire L'Heureux-Dubé, John Sopinka, Charles Gonthier, Peter Cory, Beverley McLachlin, Frank Iacobucci, John C. Major

Reasons given
- Majority: Sopinka J, joined by La Forest, Gonthier, Iacobucci and Major JJ
- Dissent: McLachlin J, joined by L'Heureux-Dubé J
- Dissent: Lamer CJ
- Dissent: Cory J

Laws applied
- Charter of Rights and Freedoms, s 7 Criminal Code, s 241(b)
- Overruled by
- Carter v Canada (AG), 2015 SCC 5

Rodriguez v British Columbia (AG), [1993] 3 SCR 519 was a landmark Supreme Court of Canada decision where the prohibition of assisted suicide was challenged as contrary to the Canadian Charter of Rights and Freedoms ("Charter") by a terminally ill woman, Sue Rodriguez. In a 5–4 decision, the Court upheld the provision in the Criminal Code.

== Background ==
Sue Rodriguez was a 42-year-old mother whose illness amyotrophic lateral sclerosis (ALS or "Lou Gehrig's disease") was diagnosed in 1992. By 1993, it was found that she would not live more than a year, and so she began a crusade to strike down section 241(b) of the Criminal Code, which made assisted suicide illegal, to the extent it would be illegal for a terminally ill person to commit "physician-assisted" suicide.

She applied to the Supreme Court of British Columbia to have section 241(b) of Criminal Code struck down because it allegedly violated sections 7 (the right to "life, liberty, and security of the person), 12 (protection against "cruel and unusual treatment or punishment") and 15(1) of the Canadian Charter of Rights and Freedoms (equality). Her ethics advisor was Eike-Henner Kluge.

== Reasons of the court ==
Sopinka J, writing for the majority, found there was no violation of section 7. He first considered whether the prohibition on ending one's life engaged the right to security of person. He found the prohibition had sufficient connection with the justice system by its impact on an individual's autonomy and right to life by causing physical and psychological pain.

However, Sopinka J found the provision did not violate any principles of fundamental justice. He examined the long history of the prohibition of suicide and concludes that it reflects part of the fundamental values of society and so could not be in violation of fundamental justice.

He also rejected the claim that the provision violated the section 12 right against cruel and unusual treatment or punishment as a mere prohibition did not fall within the meaning of treatment.

Lastly, he considered the section 15 equality challenge. He noted the issue is best not resolved under this right, but in assuming it did violate section 15, he found it was clearly saved under section 1. He found the objective was pressing and substantial, rational and that there was no lesser means to achieve the goal.

In dissent, Lamer CJ held that the Criminal Code section 241(b) had infringed on section 15, but he did not consider sections 7 and 12.

Cory J ruled that the right to die is as much a protected freedom under section 7 of the Charter as any other part of life.

McLachlin J's judgment was that Criminal Code section 241(b) violated the section 7 right to security of the person and that the violation was not saved under section 1.

== Aftermath ==
The Supreme Court's ruling in Rodriguez was overturned 22 years later in the 2015 decision in Carter v Canada (AG), which found that denying assisted suicide in some cases violated Section 7 of the Charter.
