= Charter of the Rights of the Family =

The Charter of the Rights of the Family ("The Charter", La carta in Italian) was "Presented by the Holy See to all persons, institutions and authorities concerned with the mission of the family in today's world" on October 22, 1983.

== Preamble ==
A. The rights of persons, even though expressed as rights of the individual, have a fundamental social aspect which finds a vital expression in the family.

B. The family is based on marriage, constituted in the freely contracted bond of matrimony and open to the gift of children.

C. Marriage is a natural institution to which the mission of reproduction is entrusted.

D. The family exists before the State or any other community and is a natural society with inalienable rights.

== Original Text ==
Vatican.va "La carta"
