= Euthanasia and assisted suicide in the Netherlands =

Euthanasia and assisted suicide in the Netherlands are regulated by the Termination of Life on Request and Assisted Suicide (Review Procedures) Act which was passed and took in effect in 2002. It states that euthanasia and physician-assisted suicide are not punishable if the attending physician acts in accordance with criteria of due care. These criteria concern the patient's request, the patient's suffering (unbearable and hopeless), the information provided to the patient, the absence of reasonable alternatives, consultation of another physician and the applied method of ending life. To demonstrate their compliance, the Act requires physicians to consult another, independent colleague before the euthanasia (a so called "SCEN doctor") and to send a report after the euthanasia to a review committee.

== Legal framework ==
During the early 20th century, euthanasia became a subject of debate among European physicians, philosophers, and legal scholars. In the Netherlands, however, the practice continued to be prohibited and was widely opposed by religious and medical groups.

In 1903, the Dutch Penal Code formally outlawed both euthanasia and assisted suicide under Articles 293 and 294, with violations carrying penalties of up to 12 years in prison.

In 1936, the Voluntary Euthanasia Legalisation Society (now Dignity in Dying) was founded in the United Kingdom and became one of the earliest advocacy organisations for legal reform.

The legal debate concerning euthanasia in the Netherlands began with the "Postma case" in 1973, concerning a physician who had facilitated the death of her mother following repeated explicit requests for euthanasia. While the physician was convicted, the court's judgment set out criteria when a doctor would not be required to keep a patient alive contrary to their will. This set of criteria was formalised in the course of a number of court cases during the 1980s.

The "Postma case" was prosecuted under Article 293 of the Dutch Criminal Code, which criminalises euthanasia (intentional termination of life at the patient's request) unless strict legal exceptions apply. Although the act remained illegal, the court's ruling introduced the idea that a physician might avoid punishment if acting out of necessity in response to unbearable and hopeless suffering. Following the case, discussion of euthanasia expanded within both the medical profession and public sphere. The Nederlandse Vereniging voor een Vrijwillig Levenseinde (NVVE), founded in 1973 shortly after the ruling, became an important advocacy organisation promoting the right to a voluntary end of life and supporting further legal reform. Its work, alongside evolving court decisions in the 1980s, contributed to the gradual formalisation of "due care" criteria that later shaped Dutch euthanasia law.

In 1981, the Rotterdam court case involving psychiatrist Boudewijn Chabot was an important legal development in Dutch euthanasia law. The case considered whether physician-assisted death could be justified in situations of severe psychological suffering without a terminal physical illness. Although the physician was found to have acted improperly in some respects, the ruling recognised that unbearable psychological suffering could, under strict conditions, fall within euthanasia jurisprudence.

The case helped establish early judicial criteria, including that the patient must experience unbearable suffering (and, in many cases, be terminally ill), make a voluntary and repeated request, and that the physician must consult another independent doctor. These principles influenced later Dutch euthanasia law and the interpretation of "unbearable and hopeless suffering."

In 1984, a key legal development was the Schoonheim case, the first euthanasia case reviewed by the Dutch Supreme Court. The case involved a physician who performed euthanasia on a 95-year-old patient suffering unbearably with no hope of recovery. The Court ruled that a physician who causes death may use "force majeure" (conflict of duty) as a defence when balancing the duty to preserve life with the duty to relieve suffering. It also stated that doctors who met these conditions would not automatically be convicted. The case became an important precedent in Dutch euthanasia law and helped shape the "due care" criteria later included in the 2002 euthanasia law.

Long-term trends in euthanasia and end-of-life decision-making in the Netherlands have been documented in successive national studies. The Remmelink Report, commissioned by the Dutch government and published in 1991 under the leadership of Attorney General Jan Remmelink, was the first comprehensive nationwide study of medical end-of-life practices. It examined physician behaviour across a range of decisions, including euthanasia, physician-assisted suicide, withdrawal of treatment, and the use of high-dose analgesia with potential life-shortening effects.

The report estimated that in 1990, out of approximately 130,000 deaths in the Netherlands, around 2,300 cases involved voluntary euthanasia and approximately 400 involved physician-assisted suicide. It also identified cases in which life-ending measures were performed without an explicit request from the patient, described in the report as "termination of life without explicit request."These findings contributed to significant public and parliamentary debate and are frequently cited in discussions of the development of Dutch euthanasia law and subsequent regulatory safeguards.

=== Legislation (2002 Act) ===
Termination of Life on Request and Assisted Suicide (Review Procedures) Act was passed in April 2001 and took effect on 1 April 2002. It legalises euthanasia and physician-assisted suicide in very specific cases, under very specific circumstances. The law was proposed by Els Borst, the D66 minister of Health. The procedures codified in the law had been a convention of the Dutch medical community for over twenty years.

The law allows medical review board to suspend prosecution of doctors who performed euthanasia when each of the following conditions are fulfilled:

- the patient's suffering is unbearable with no prospect of improvement
- the patient's request for euthanasia must be voluntary and persist over time (the request cannot be granted when under the influence of others, psychological illness or drugs)
- the patient must be fully aware of his/her condition, prospects, and options
- there must be consultation with at least one other independent doctor who needs to confirm the conditions mentioned above
- the death must be carried out in a medically appropriate fashion by the doctor or patient, and the doctor must be present
- the patient is at least 12 years old (patients between 12 and 16 years of age require the consent of their parents)

The doctor must also report the cause of death to the municipal coroner in accordance with the relevant provisions of the Burial and Cremation Act. A regional review committee assesses whether a case of termination of life on request or assisted suicide complies with the due care criteria. Depending on its findings, the case will either be closed or, if the conditions are not met, brought to the attention of the Public Prosecutor. Finally, the legislation offers an explicit recognition of the validity of a written declaration of will of the patient regarding euthanasia (a "euthanasia directive"). Such declarations can be used when a patient is in a coma or otherwise unable to state if they wish to be euthanised.

The Dutch euthanasia framework places strong emphasis on procedural due process. Physicians must follow strict reporting and consultation requirements, including obtaining an independent medical opinion and submitting each case to a regional review committee. These safeguards are intended to ensure transparency, legal accountability, and compliance with the statutory due care criteria.

Euthanasia remains a criminal offense in cases not meeting the law's specific conditions, with the exception of several situations that are not subject to the restrictions of the law at all, because they are not considered euthanasia but normal medical practice:

- stopping or not starting a medically useless (futile) treatment
- stopping or not starting a treatment at the patient's request
- speeding up death as a side-effect of treatment necessary for alleviating serious suffering

Euthanasia of children under the age of 12 remains technically illegal; however, Dr. Eduard Verhagen has documented several cases and, together with colleagues and prosecutors, has developed a protocol to be followed in those cases. Prosecutors will refrain from pressing charges if this Groningen Protocol is followed.

== Practice ==
Number of reported cases of euthanasia / assisted suicide over time and as a fraction of the total number of deaths in the Netherlands (Includes data from Statistics Netherlands)

In 2023, the number of official cases of euthanasia in the Netherlands was 9,068 which was 5.4% of total deaths in the Netherlands.

In 2010, the number had been 4,050, and according to research done by the Vrije Universiteit, University Medical Center Utrecht and Statistics Netherlands, and published in The Lancet, that was not more than before the "Termination of Life on Request and Assisted Suicide (Review Procedures) Act" took effect in 2002; and the study concluded that In effect, the legislation did not lead to more cases of euthanasia and assisted suicide on request.

By the late 20th century, the Royal Dutch Medical Association (KNMG), the main medical organization in the Netherlands, played a significant role in shaping Dutch euthanasia policy. The KNMG stated that euthanasia could be considered acceptable under strict conditions, including that the patient makes a voluntary request, is experiencing unbearable suffering, and has no reasonable prospect of recovery.

At the time, euthanasia was still illegal, but physicians who followed KNMG guidelines were often not prosecuted, creating a gap between law and medical practice. The KNMG also supported procedural safeguards, such as mandatory consultation with an independent physician and careful medical review before euthanasia could be performed.

These guidelines and position statements later influenced Dutch legislation, including the 2002 law that legalized euthanasia and physician-assisted suicide under regulated conditions.

In 2003, in the Netherlands, 1,626 cases were officially reported of euthanasia in the sense of a physician assisting the death (1.2 % of all deaths). Usually the sedative sodium thiopental is intravenously administered to induce a coma. Once it is certain that the patient is in a deep coma, typically after less than a minute, pancuronium is administered to stop breathing and cause death.

Officially reported were also 148 cases of physician-assisted dying (0.14% of all deaths), usually by drinking a strong (10 g) barbiturate potion. The doctor is required to be present for two reasons:

- to make sure the potion is not taken by a different person, by accident (or, theoretically, for "unauthorised" suicide or perhaps even murder)
- to monitor the process and be available to apply the combined procedure mentioned below, if necessary

In two cases, the doctor was reprimanded for not being present while the patient drank the potion. They said they had not realised that this was required.

Forty-one cases were reported to combine the two procedures: usually in these cases the patient drinks the potion, but this does not cause death. After a few hours, or earlier in the case of vomiting, a muscle relaxant such as pancuronium or vecuronium is administered to cause death. (Note: “Spierverslapper” is used in the source text and translates literally to “muscle relaxant.” However, the agents listed (e.g., pancuronium, atracurium, rocuronium, vecuronium) are classified in English-language medical usage as neuromuscular blocking agents, which induce paralysis rather than muscle relaxation in the conventional sense.)

By far, most reported cases concerned cancer patients. Also, in most cases the procedure was applied at home.

A study in 2000 found that Dutch physicians who intend to provide assistance with suicide sometimes end up administering a lethal medication themselves because of the patient's inability to take the medication or because of problems with the completion of physician-assisted suicide.

In 2010, there were 3,136 cases reported of a physician assisting the death of a patient. When categorised there were, 2,910 cases of "end of life on request", 182 cases of assisted suicide, and in 44 cases it was a combination. The evaluation commissions decided that in 9 cases the procedures were not according to protocol and referred the cases to the Public Prosecution Service and the Health Care Inspectorate. The number of reported cases was rising by 8% each year. In 2017, the number of reported euthanasias had increased to 6,585; 99.8 % of them being performed carefully. The reason for this rise is not clear.

In 2017, the number of reported euthanasia cases had increased to 6,585, with 99.8% assessed as having been performed in accordance with legal due care criteria. The reasons for the long-term increase in reported cases are not fully established, though factors discussed in the literature include greater medical familiarity with the procedure, increased public acceptance, and improved reporting compliance.

In 2024, the Netherlands recorded 9,958 reported cases of euthanasia and assisted suicide.

== Further developments ==
Under current Dutch law, euthanasia by doctors is only legal in cases of "hopeless and unbearable" suffering. In practice this means that it is limited to those suffering from serious medical conditions like severe pain, exhaustion or asphyxia. Sometimes, psychiatric patients that have proven to be untreatable, can get euthanasia. There is much discussion about people with early dementia who have previously stated in a written will that if they ever got dementia, they would want to get euthanasia.

In February 2010, a citizens' initiative called Out of Free Will further demanded that all Dutch people over 70 who feel tired of life should have the right to professional help in ending it. The organisation started collecting signatures in support of this proposed change in Dutch legislation. A number of prominent Dutch citizens supported the initiative, including former ministers and artists, legal scholars and physicians. However, this initiative has never been legalised.

In 2016, the Dutch Health Minister of the Second Rutte cabinet announced plans to draft a law that would allow assisted suicide in cases without a medical condition, if the person feels they have completed life.

In April 2023, euthanasia was expanded to include children of all ages who are in unbearable suffering.

In November 2023, the political party D66 drafted a bill to give people aged 75 and over the option to have euthanasia if they felt they had completed life.

== Foreign views ==
Under the regime of Adolf Hitler, Nazi Germany carried out campaigns of mass murder through Aktion T4, an involuntary euthanasia program conducted between 1939 and 1945. The program targeted people with disabilities, mental illnesses, and chronic illnesses whom the Nazi government considered “life unworthy of life.” Historians estimate that around 70,000 people were killed during the program’s official phase from 1939 to 1941, while related killings continued throughout World War II.

After the German occupation of the Netherlands in 1940, Nazi racial and medical policies also influenced parts of Dutch society and healthcare. Aktion T4 later became an important reference point in discussions about euthanasia and medical ethics in the Netherlands and other countries, although it was fundamentally different from the Netherlands’ modern voluntary euthanasia laws.

In 2012, United States Republican presidential candidate Rick Santorum claimed that forced euthanasia accounted for 4.2% of all deaths in the Netherlands and that elderly Dutch people wear a bracelet reading “Do not euthanize me.”, but these claims have been disproven. The lack of a formal statement by Dutch officials on the matter angered Dutch politician Frans Timmermans, who demanded minister of foreign affairs Uri Rosenthal to take a public stance against such assertions.

The 2019 suicide of 17-year-old Noa Pothoven led to false reports in English-language media that she had been granted an assisted death.

The euthanasia of 29-year-old Zoraya ter Beek in May 2024, who had been a sufferer of chronic depression, autism, anxiety disorder and psychotraumas, and who decided that she wanted a medically-assisted death, attracted international attention.

== See also ==
- Centre of Expertise on Euthanasia
