= Buddhism and euthanasia =

Application of Buddhist ethics

Buddhist views, although varying on a series of canons within the three branches of Buddhism (Theravada, Mahayana, and Vajrayana), observe the concept of euthanasia, or "mercy killing", in a denunciatory manner. Such methods of euthanasia include voluntary, involuntary, and non-voluntary.

In the past, as one school of Buddhism evolved into the next, their scriptures were recorded through the oral messages of Buddha himself on Buddhist principles and values followed, guiding approximately 500 million Buddhists spanning the globe on their path to nirvana. In the Monastic Rule, or Vinaya, a consensus is reached by the Buddha on euthanasia and assisted suicide that expresses a lack of fondness of its practice.

Buddhism does not confirm that life should be conserved by implementing whatever is necessary to postpone death, but instead expresses that the intentional precipitation of death is ethically inadmissible in every condition one is presented in.

== Vinaya ==
The Vinaya Tripitaka is one of three Buddhist canonical sources that makes up the Tripitaka that most relates to euthanasia. It was created to encompass a series of case laws in which Buddha provided judgement on various matters, even though the term "euthanasia" is not specifically mentioned.

Monks and nuns are meant to follow the decorum that is relayed, which expresses what is considered to be wrongfully killing someone (prohibited by Buddhist precepts) by the actions of another who is conferred to follow holy orders and those who are not. Outside of Vinaya, there is no specific mention in early Buddhist texts on euthanasia.

During the life of Buddha, instances occurred when monks who practiced medicine were put in situations where they had to make a decision to assist in another's suicide by physically taking their life, providing the instrument used to take their life, or allowing the person to suffer, as observed in cases written in Vinaya.

The Buddha, therefore, included a precept in Vinaya against the termination of another human life following the discovery that monks either took their own life or requested that others kill them because they were unhappy with their body. Buddha stated that:

Should any bhikkhu intentionally deprive a human being of life, or search for an assassin for him, or praise the advantages of death, or incite him to die (saying,): "My good man, what use is this evil, miserable life to you? Death would be better for you than life," or with such an idea in mind, such a purpose in mind, should in various ways praise the advantages of death or incite him to die, he also is defeated and no longer in affiliation.

With this, Buddha later expanded the precept in the third parajika, adding the punishment of excommunication for life from the Sangha after recognizing a number of monks provoking a patient to believe that he should choose death over life.

In this instance, the monks praised the idea that death was beautiful to a sick monk, persuading him to take an unrevealed measure to end his life. Because of the monk's expression of virtue, as he was informed by other monks, he would receive a good rebirth. As a result of these provocations, the monk stopped eating and later died.

== Death and karma ==
Buddhists believe that life begins at the point of birth and ends when the individual dies. Throughout the course of the individual's life, between life and death, they are to be respected with dignity, regardless of their state of mental capacity or psychometric functions. What constitutes life in a body is usma (heat), ayu (vitality), and vinanna (sentiency).

Among Buddhists, there is some disagreement as to when one is truly dead. Some consider death to be when the brain loses its functionality. And there are those who disagree with this idea. When Buddha died, according to ancient texts, his 25-year personal attendant Ananda declared him dead. However, Ananda was later corrected by a monk senior to him, claiming that Buddha was only in a severe state of yogistic stupor. During this yogic trance, Buddha lacked any vital signs of life, making it unclear for future Buddhists to determine the point of death when such physiological states exist and are relayed in Buddhist literary texts.

Although at death one loses all physical possessions, leaving their family, loved ones, and achievements all behind, death does not destroy all that belongs to a person. The purification of their character through virtuous and meditative practices carries over into their next life and into their mental sequence of continuation.

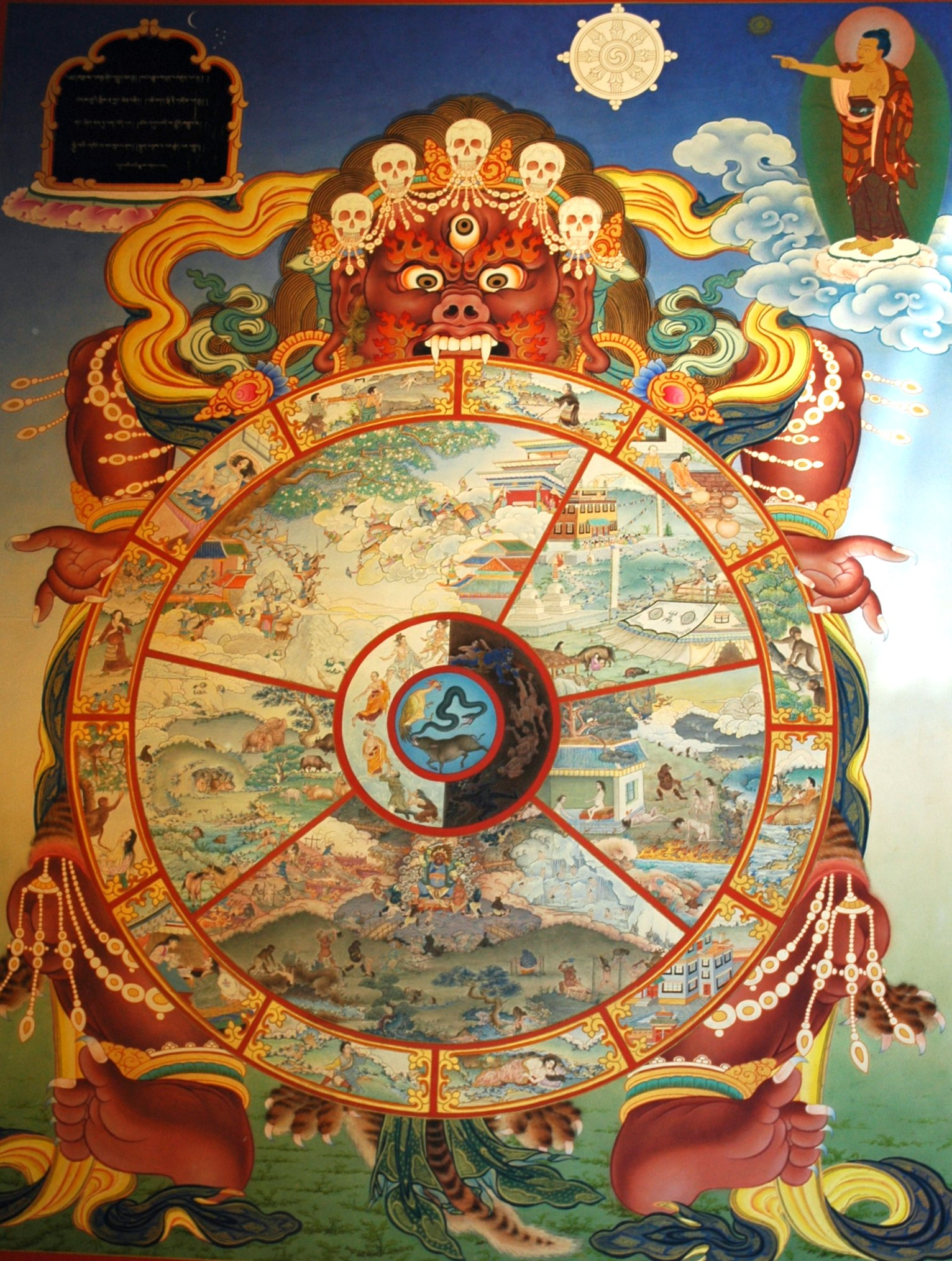
Yama, Lord of Death, holding the Bhavachakra or Wheel of Life

Buddhists hold the belief that upon death, they are reborn and will experience life through a series of lifetimes called samsara until they can cease to desire and nirvana is obtained. In conjunction with a person's previously attained karma, their state of mind at the point of death holds great importance when the determining of what kind of rebirth is to take place.

There are six realms of life in Buddhist cosmology: Hell realm (Naraka), hungry ghost (Preta) realm, animal realm (Tiracchānayoni), human realm (Manussa), demi-god realm (Asura), and god realm (Deva). Of all the realms that exist, the human realm is the most anticipated, yet the most difficult to obtain.

Based on the level of karma one garners in their current lifetime, it is determined at which realm one diverges to next upon death. The first three realms (Hell realm, hungry ghost realm, and animal realm) are the most detested of the six and are meant to cause suffering, disallowing proper mental capabilities as a result of negative karma from negative acts performed during the previous life.

And although more acceptable than the former, the asura and god realm remain unfavorable as they permit one ultimate happiness but prevents the opportunity for the spirit to progress. Only through good karma can one's spirit reach the human realm.

Euthanasia, although it can be considered a compassionate act, is not seen in Buddhism as an act of selflessness and benevolence, but rather an act of damage masked as help, which in turn can result in negative karma. If someone is suffering as a result of sickness, it could be a result of karma, and ending their life is not likely to end their adversity, as the suffering caused by karma will only follow them after death until its energy concludes.

== Compassion ==
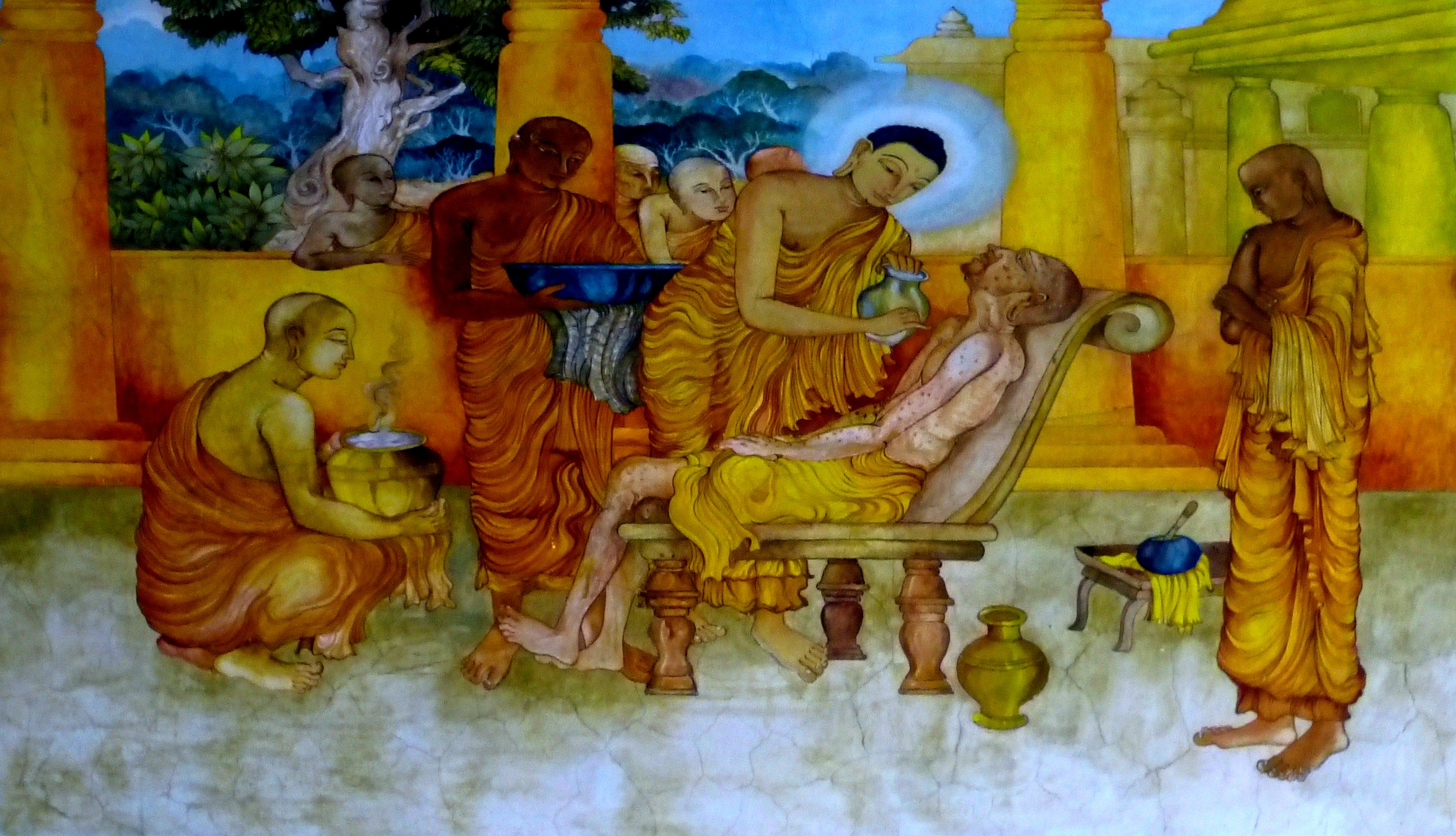
The Buddha and Ananda tend a sick monk

Compassion (karuṇā) is a Buddhist value that reinforces how Buddhism views standards in medicine, which is observed in all three schools of Buddhism. Although it can be seen as morally good, committing an act through compassion is not always justified. Taking a life out of compassion to mitigate the affliction one experiences through illness or injury is an instance in which a person may feel he or she is vindicated to exploit euthanasia. However, in Buddhism and the Bodhisattva, it can create incongruities through the infringement of life.

An example of an unjustified act of compassion is a case written in the Vinaya, where a convicted man is hastily executed after a monk requests the executioner to do so, as to not prolong his suffering and the sorrowful period he has to wait.

A morally good scenario of compassion would be if a patient in a hospital in his or her right mind feels that their ailment is using too much of a valuable resource in limited quantities, or causing their family to spend large sums of money that is not readily available on medical bills to keep them alive.

Out of morally good compassion, he or she might decide to cease the sources of life preservation without pressure from others. Had those associations been pressuring the patient to forgo further life saving treatment, this could be observed as murderous. If the patient were terminally ill and unable to eat on their own accord, it would be a requirement of his or her associations to assist them, even if intravenous feeding was necessary.

Buddhism paints life in a way that is fundamentally valuable, and it should never be surrendered for any reason, whether compassion, amity, or anything of value. It would be an ill-advised way to show compassion rooted in misconception to endorse death using compassion as the reasoning.

== Vegetative state ==
According to Buddhist precepts, someone who is in a vegetative state is neither dead nor alive, but instead is said to be in some form of obscure state of mind and still a living individual. They lack the necessity to rely on outside assistance to support their ability to stay alive other than being supplemented with nutrients to keep them functioning for a significant number of years. With this, Buddhism sees someone in a vegetative state as a living, breathing life form, because the value in which one's life holds is not observed through individualism.

Although Buddhism views this state of being as damaged, the individual should be treated no different than before. Both animals and humans, prior to their birth as they await in the mother's womb, have value and therefore should not have their life taken from them. However, some Buddhists are under the impression that an unconscious life, or one that lacks awareness, does not have value, which is highly debatable.

Buddhism shows that even with a damaged physical organ, such as the brain, someone is still deserving of compassion because they are still capable of causing varying emotions in someone who cares for them. To end a life because of a patient's state of mind and to deny them treatment would be an act of abandonment, which would be considered irrational and unfair because Buddhists have a strong belief in compassion for all living things.

A vegetative state can be considered a varied form of meditation where the sentience of someone acts in a way not ordinary to what is regularly observed. Another form of consciousness where the body does not react is that of "formless" rebirths. Due to these meditative states, it is often difficult to determine in a physical manner a state of consciousness.

The state of consciousness, at the time, may be experiencing a demonstration of going through the processes of death in ultimate preparation so that once death does come, it can receive the best form of rebirth. During this process of preparation, the eyes and other sense-organs will cease to function, but the person's sense of touch, brain function, and life force lie in the heart.

In Buddhism, considering the conception of meditative states, some in a vegetative state are therefore still sentient. Being in a continuous state of vegetation is not the same as the process by which one prepares for death, even though it does resemble it. The possibility exists for one to lack the function to breathe and think, but still be alive.

== Alternatives to euthanasia ==
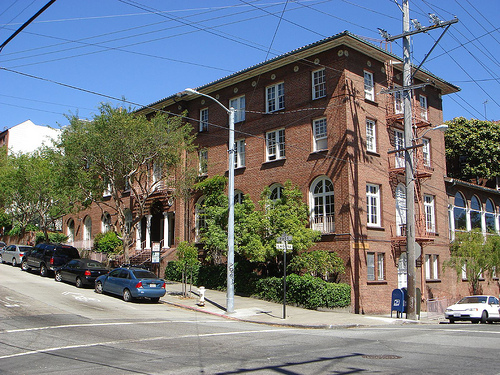
The San Francisco Zen Center

Moving someone who is terminally ill into hospice care to help mitigate physical pain with pain relievers that is not intended to end their life, allowing them to pass away painless and comfortable, is a highly considerable alternative to euthanasia.

Hospice care is meant to assist a person to have what is called a "good death". When one nears death, they should be able to reflect on their life peacefully. Since 1971, the San Francisco Zen Center has offered assistance to terminally ill patients, with trained hospice employees since the inception of a hospice training program in 1987. The Buddhist Hospice Trust in the United Kingdom has been an alternative to this center since its founding in 1987.

The center provides volunteers to visit those nearing death, counsel and sympathy for bereaved individuals and is also involved in researching death and mourning. The purpose of such a center is to alleviate any amount of anxiety one could experience when approaching death, leaving known loved ones behind, and to ensure a clear and calm state of mind.

Hospice care employees therefore prefer not to allow a person to die in an anesthetized, unconscious state of mind. A positive transition to a future life is best obtained when one dies with a clear conscience, free of anger, dissent, and anxiety, and in a relaxed state of being. In Buddhism, a "good death" is facilitated by family and friends, who do their best to ensure the dying person is untroubled and uplifted.
