= Bibliography of the history of euthanasia =

- Subject: History of euthanasia, assisted death, and the movements and laws surrounding them
- Chronological scope: Classical antiquity to the present
- Geographic scope: Europe, North America, Africa, East Asia and Australia
- Language: English-language scholarship, with selected German- and Dutch-language works
- Arrangement: Chronological, geographic and thematic
- Citation style: APA 7

The following is a bibliography about the history of euthanasia. This bibliography is limited to history and excludes other disciplines.

Euthanasia (pronounced [/eu̯.tʰa.naˈsi.a/]; Greek: εὐθανασία, lit. 'good death'; εὖ, eu, lit. 'well' or 'good' + θάνατος, thanatos, 'death') is the deliberate ending of a person's life to relieve suffering or in some case for social engineering, eugenics, or genocide.

Bibliography contains academic level English language books (including translations) and journal articles, published mainly post World War II. (Note: Works published before World War II should be limited to areas where there is no significant post World War II books on the subject or when the work in question has significant historical merit.) Book entries may have references to reviews published in academic journals or major newspapers when these could be considered helpful. These reference reviews also function as a resource to find other works on this subject.

Works listed here are cited in the notes or bibliographies of scholarly sources. Each is published by an academic or major trade press, written by a recognized expert, or substantially reviewed in scholarly journals; borderline cases are omitted. A selection of primary sources are included. Many of the books below carry their own bibliographies; see Further reading section for longer ones, and External links section for historical sites and museums.

Citations follow APA style. (Note: Entries are in plain text APA 7 format without templates; templates are used only for reviews and notes.) Book have citations to academic journal or mainstream published reviews when available. For books only partly about the subject, give relevant chapter or section titles where useful and available. Translators of the original-language edition are included when possible. In cases where a title or name has appeared with more than one English spelling, use the most recent published form is used and a footnote documents any earlier title under which the work appeared.

== Euthanasia before 1900 ==
- Amundsen, D. W. (1978). The physician's obligation to prolong life: A medical duty without classical roots. The Hastings Center Report, 8(4), 23. JSTOR 3560974
- Brody, B. A. (Ed.). (1989). Suicide and euthanasia: Historical and contemporary themes. Kluwer Academic Publishers. doi:10.1007/978-94-015-7838-7
- Carrick, P. (1985). Medical ethics in antiquity: Philosophical perspectives on abortion and euthanasia. D. Reidel. doi:10.1007/978-94-009-5235-5
- Fye, W. B. (1978). Active euthanasia: An historical survey of its conceptual origins and introduction into medical thought. Bulletin of the History of Medicine, 52(4), 492–502. PMID 383177
- Gourevitch, D. (1969). Suicide among the sick in classical antiquity. Bulletin of the History of Medicine, 43(6), 501–518. PMID 4904692
- Munk, W. (1887). Euthanasia: Or, medical treatment in aid of an easy death. Longmans, Green.
- Papadimitriou, J. D., Skiadas, P., Mavrantonis, C. S., Polimeropoulos, V., Papadimitriou, D. J., & Papacostas, K. J. (2007). Euthanasia and suicide in antiquity: Viewpoint of the dramatists and philosophers. Journal of the Royal Society of Medicine, 100(1), 25–28. doi:10.1177/014107680710000111
- Stolberg, M. (2007). Active euthanasia in pre-modern society, 1500–1800: Learned debates and popular practices. Social History of Medicine, 20(2), 205–221. doi:10.1093/shm/hkm034

== Euthanasia after 1900 ==
=== United States, Canada, Austrailia, and the United Kingdom ===
- Appel, J. M. (2004). A duty to kill? A duty to die? Rethinking the euthanasia controversy of 1906. Bulletin of the History of Medicine, 78(3), 610–634. doi:10.1353/bhm.2004.0106
- Ball, H. (2012). At liberty to die. New York University Press. doi:10.18574/nyu/9780814791042.001.0001
- Dowbiggin, I. (2003). A merciful end: The euthanasia movement in modern America. Oxford University Press. doi:10.1093/oso/9780195154436.001.0001
- Dowbiggin, I. (2005). A concise history of euthanasia: Life, death, God, and medicine. Rowman & Littlefield.
- Emanuel, E. J. (1994). The history of euthanasia debates in the United States and Britain. Annals of Internal Medicine, 121(10), 793–802. doi:10.7326/0003-4819-121-10-199411150-00010
- Filene, P. G. (1998). In the arms of others: A cultural history of the right-to-die in America. Ivan R. Dee.
- Hillyard, D., & Dombrink, J. (2002). Dying right: The death with dignity movement. Routledge. doi:10.4324/9780203902554
- Humphry, D. (1991). Final exit. Hemlock Society.
- Kamisar, Y. (1958). Some non-religious views against proposed mercy-killing legislation. Minnesota Law Review, 42(6), 969. doi:10.24926/265535.3488
- Kemp, N. D. A. (2002). "Merciful release": The history of the British euthanasia movement. Manchester University Press.
- Kevorkian, J. (1991). Prescription—medicide: The goodness of planned death. Prometheus Books.
- Lavi, S. J. (2005). The modern art of dying: A history of euthanasia in the United States. Princeton University Press.
- Williams, G. (1958). Mercy-killing legislation: A rejoinder. Minnesota Law Review, 43(1), 1. doi:10.24926/265535.2290

=== Europe ===
- Benzenhöfer, U. (1999). Der gute Tod? Euthanasie und Sterbehilfe in Geschichte und Gegenwart. C. H. Beck.
- Biotti-Mache, F. (2016). Euthanasia: Elements of language and history (Cadenza Academic Translations, Trans.). Études sur la mort, (150), 17–33. doi:10.3917/eslm.150.0017
- Griffiths, J., Bood, A., & Weyers, H. (1998). Euthanasia and law in the Netherlands. Amsterdam University Press. doi:10.5117/9789053562758
- Guerra, M. J. (1999). Euthanasia in Spain: The public debate after Ramon Sampedro's case. Bioethics, 13(5), 426–432. doi:10.1111/1467-8519.00170
- Kennedy, J. (2002). Een weloverwogen dood: Euthanasie in Nederland. Bert Bakker.
- Vermeersch, E. (2002). The Belgian law on euthanasia: The historical and ethical background. Acta Chirurgica Belgica, 102(6), 394–397. doi:10.1080/00015458.2002.11679341
- Weyers, H. (2004). Euthanasie: Het proces van rechtsverandering. Amsterdam University Press. doi:10.5117/9789053566473
- Weyers, H. (2006). Explaining the emergence of euthanasia law in the Netherlands: How the sociology of law can help the sociology of bioethics. Sociology of Health & Illness, 28(6), 802–816. doi:10.1111/j.1467-9566.2006.00543.x

==== Nazi Germany ====
- Alexander, L. (1949). Medical science under dictatorship. New England Journal of Medicine, 241(2), 39–47. doi:10.1056/nejm194907142410201
- Aly, G., Chroust, P., & Pross, C. (1994). Cleansing the fatherland: Nazi medicine and racial hygiene (B. Cooper, Trans.). Johns Hopkins University Press. doi:10.56021/9780801847752
- Brody, H., & Cooper, M. W. (2014). Binding and Hoche's "Life unworthy of life": A historical and ethical analysis. Perspectives in Biology and Medicine, 57(4), 500–511. doi:10.1353/pbm.2014.0042
- Bryant, M. S. (2005). Confronting the "good death": Nazi euthanasia on trial, 1945–1953. University Press of Colorado. doi:10.26530/oapen_625241
- Burleigh, M. (1994). Death and deliverance: "Euthanasia" in Germany, c. 1900–1945. Cambridge University Press.
- Friedlander, H. (1995). The origins of Nazi genocide: From euthanasia to the final solution. University of North Carolina Press.
- Lifton, R. J. (1986). The Nazi doctors: Medical killing and the psychology of genocide. Basic Books.

=== Euthanasia in Africa ===
- Barnard, C. (1980). Good life, good death: A doctor's case for euthanasia and suicide. Prentice-Hall.
- Parle, J. (2022). The bounds of compassion? Medical ethics and the politics of medical mercy killings in South Africa, 1930s to 1976. South African Historical Journal, 74(2), 272–307. doi:10.1080/02582473.2022.2136740
- Parle, J. (2025). The South African Voluntary Euthanasia Society (SAVES), the living will, and the "euthanasia controversy", 1974–1994. Southern Journal for Contemporary History, 50(1), 4–34. doi:10.38140/sjch.v50i1.8463
- South African Law Commission. (1998). Euthanasia and the artificial preservation of life (Project 86, Report).

=== Euthanasia in East Asia ===
- Ahn, K., & Bae, H. (2010). Reflections on the movement for the legalization of "death with dignity as withdrawal of futile life-sustaining treatment" in South Korea. Journal of Korean Law, 10, 43–64.
- Akabayashi, A. (2002). Euthanasia, assisted suicide, and cessation of life support: Japan's policy, law, and an analysis of whistle blowing in two recent mercy killing cases. Social Science & Medicine, 55(4), 517–527. doi:10.1016/s0277-9536(01)00184-8
- Hovhannisyan, A. (2018). Ōta Tenrei's defense of birth control, eugenics and euthanasia. Contemporary Japan, 30(1), 28–42. doi:10.1080/18692729.2018.1424261
- Kai, K. (2010). Euthanasia and death with dignity in Japanese law. Journal International de Bioéthique, 21(4), 135. doi:10.3917/jib.214.0135
- Otani, I. (2010). "Good manner of dying" as a normative concept: "Autocide," "granny dumping" and discussions on euthanasia/death with dignity in Japan. International Journal of Japanese Sociology, 19(1), 49–63. doi:10.1111/j.1475-6781.2010.01136.x
- Qiu, R.-Z. (1993). Chinese medical ethics and euthanasia. Cambridge Quarterly of Healthcare Ethics, 2(1), 69–76. doi:10.1017/s0963180100000657
- Spoden, C. (2020). Deciding one's own death in advance: Biopower, living wills, and resistance to a legislation of death with dignity in Japan. Contemporary Japan, 32(1), 63–82. doi:10.1080/18692729.2020.1714279

== Eugenics and euthanasia ==
- Dowbiggin, I. (2002). "A rational coalition": Euthanasia, eugenics, and birth control in America, 1940–1970. Journal of Policy History, 14(3), 223–260. doi:10.1353/jph.2002.0017
- Pernick, M. S. (1996). The black stork. Oxford University Press. doi:10.1093/oso/9780195077315.001.0001
- Proctor, R. N. (1988). Racial hygiene: Medicine under the Nazis. Harvard University Press.
- Schmuhl, H.-W. (1987). Rassenhygiene, Nationalsozialismus, Euthanasie: Von der Verhütung zur Vernichtung "lebensunwerten Lebens", 1890–1945. Vandenhoeck & Ruprecht.
- Weikart, R. (2002). Darwinism and death: Devaluing human life in Germany 1859–1920. Journal of the History of Ideas, 63(2), 323–344. doi:10.1353/jhi.2002.0019

== Law, medicine and the history of dying ==
- Broeckaert, B. (2016). Euthanasia: History. In H. ten Have (Ed.), Encyclopedia of global bioethics (pp. 1188–1194). Springer. doi:10.1007/978-3-319-09483-0_180
- Humphry, D., & Wickett, A. (1986). The right to die: Understanding euthanasia. Harper & Row.
- Mahar, C. (2023). The good death through time. Melbourne University Publishing. JSTOR jj.1127645
- Otlowski, M. (1997). Voluntary euthanasia and the common law. Clarendon Press.
- Pappas, D. M. (2012). The euthanasia/assisted-suicide debate. ABC-CLIO. doi:10.5040/9798400648168

== Journals ==
Journals in the history of medicine and bioethics that publish research on euthanasia and assisted death.

=== History of medicine ===
- Bulletin of the History of Medicine (Johns Hopkins University Press, 1933–present). Published as the Bulletin of the Institute of the History of Medicine until 1938. Official journal of the American Association for the History of Medicine and the Johns Hopkins Institute of the History of Medicine. ISSN 0007-5140 (print), ISSN 1086-3176 (online).
- History of Psychiatry (SAGE Publications, 1990–present). ISSN 0957-154X (print), ISSN 1740-2360 (online).
- Journal of the History of Medicine and Allied Sciences (Oxford University Press, 1946–present). ISSN 0022-5045 (print), ISSN 1468-4373 (online).
- Medical History (Cambridge University Press, 1957–present). ISSN 0025-7273 (print), ISSN 2048-8343 (online).
- Social History of Medicine (Oxford University Press, 1988–present). Journal of the Society for the Social History of Medicine. ISSN 0951-631X (print), ISSN 1477-4666 (online).

=== Bioethics ===
- Bioethics (Wiley, 1987–present). ISSN 0269-9702 (print), ISSN 1467-8519 (online).
- Cambridge Quarterly of Healthcare Ethics (Cambridge University Press, 1992–present). ISSN 0963-1801 (print), ISSN 1469-2147 (online).
- Hastings Center Report (Wiley, 1971–present). Journal of the Hastings Center for Bioethics. ISSN 0093-0334 (print), ISSN 1552-146X (online).
- Journal of Medical Ethics (BMJ, 1975–present). Published for the Institute of Medical Ethics. ISSN 0306-6800 (print), ISSN 1473-4257 (online).
- Journal of Medicine and Philosophy (Oxford University Press, 1976–present). ISSN 0360-5310 (print), ISSN 1744-5019 (online).
- Kennedy Institute of Ethics Journal (Johns Hopkins University Press, 1991–present). Published for the Kennedy Institute of Ethics. ISSN 1054-6863 (print), ISSN 1086-3249 (online).

== See also ==
- Euthanasia
- Voluntary euthanasia
- Non-voluntary euthanasia
- Involuntary euthanasia
- Assisted suicide
- Right to die
- Legality of euthanasia
- Religious views on euthanasia
- Euthanasia in the United States
- Euthanasia in the United Kingdom
- Euthanasia and assisted suicide in Canada
