= Euthanasia and the slippery slope =

Slippery slope argument in euthanasia

Critics of euthanasia sometimes claim that legalizing any form of the practice will lead to a slippery slope effect, resulting eventually in expansion to non-terminal illnesses and possibly non-voluntary or even involuntary euthanasia. The slippery slope argument has been present in the euthanasia debate since at least the 1930s.

Lawyer Eugene Volokh argued in his article The Mechanism of the Slippery Slope that judicial logic could eventually lead to a gradual break in the legal restrictions for euthanasia, while medical oncologist and palliative care specialist Jan Bernheim believes the law can provide safeguards against slippery-slope effects, saying that the grievances of euthanasia opponents are unfounded.

== The slippery slope ==
As applied to the euthanasia debate, the slippery slope argument claims that the acceptance of certain practices, such as physician-assisted suicide or voluntary euthanasia, will invariably lead to the acceptance or practice of concepts which are currently deemed unacceptable, such as non-voluntary or involuntary euthanasia. Thus, it is argued, in order to prevent these undesirable practices from occurring, we need to resist taking the first step.

There are two basic forms which the argument may take, each of which involves different arguments for and against. The first of these, referred to as the logical version, argues that the acceptance of the initial act, A, logically entails the acceptance of B, where A is acceptable but B is an undesirable action. This version is further refined into two forms based on how A entails B. In the first, it is argued that there "is no relevant conceptual difference between A and B" – the premises that underlie the acceptance of A logically entail the acceptance of B. Within the euthanasia debate, van der Burg identifies one of Richard Sherlock's objections to Duff and Campbell as fitting this model. Duff and Campbell had presented an argument for the selective non-treatment of newborns suffering from serious defects. In responding to Duff and Campbell's stance, Sherlock argued that the premises which they employed in order to justify their position would be just as effective, if not more so, in justifying the non-treatment of older children: "In short, if there is any justification at all for what Duff and Campbell propose for newborns then there is better justification for a similar policy with respect to children at any age."

The second logical form of the slippery slope argument, referred to as the "arbitrary line" version, argues that the acceptance of A will lead to the acceptance of A1, as A1 is not significantly different from A. A1 will then lead to A2, A2 to A3, and eventually the process will lead to the unacceptable B. As Glover argues, this version of the argument does not say that there is no significant difference between A and B, but instead argues that it is impossible to justify accepting A while also denying B – drawing a line at any point between the two would be creating an arbitrary cut-off point that would be unjustifiable. Glover provides the example of infanticide (or non-voluntary euthanasia) and severely deformed children:

"If it is allowable at birth for children with some grave abnormality, what will we say about an equally grave abnormality that is only detectable at three months? And another that is only detectable at six months? And another that is detectable at birth only slightly less serious? And another that is slightly less serious than that one?"

— Jonathan Glover

The second primary form of the slippery slope argument is that of the "Empirical" or "Psychological" argument. The empirical version does not rely on a logical connection between A and B, but instead argues that an acceptance of A will, in time, lead to an acceptance of B. The process is not a logical necessity, but one which will be followed through a process of moral change. Enoch describes the application of this form of the argument thus:

"Once we allow voluntary euthanasia, she argues, we may (or will) fail to make the crucial distinction, and then we will make the morally unacceptable outcome of allowing involuntary euthanasia; or perhaps even though we may make the relevant distinction, we will not act accordingly for some reason (perhaps a political reason, or a reason that has to do with weakness of will, or some other reason)."

— David Enoch

Glover, however, notes that this line of argument requires good evidence that this direction will be followed, as not all boundaries are thus pushed.

More generally, it has been argued that, in employing the slippery slope, there can be an "implicit concession", as it starts from the assumption that the initial practice is acceptable – even though it will lead to unacceptable outcomes in the future. Nevertheless, van der Burg argues that this is not a useful concession, as the outcomes are intended to make it clear that the initial practice was not justifiable after all.

== Response to the logical versions ==
Countering the first logical version of the slippery slope argument, it is argued that the different types of euthanasia are sufficiently distinct that it is not "logically inconsistent" to support one version while denying the others. It is possible to support, for example, voluntary euthanasia while denying non-voluntary euthanasia, just as it is possible to support both – the distinction comes not from a logical inconsistency, but a choice of principles, such that a focus on euthanasia as personal choice will support voluntary euthanasia but not non-voluntary euthanasia, while a focus on a person's "best interests" may allow for the support of both. From a more practical perspective, another option when faced with the logical version of the argument is to simply accept the consequences. This was the response by Duff and Campbell to Sherlock. Rather than arguing that their premises were flawed, they argued that Sherlock was correct: their criteria could also be applied to older children, and thus it should be applied, as it was "probably the most caring policy generally."

In responding to the "arbitrary line" version of the slippery slope argument, it is argued that the stance relies on the "paradox of the heap", and that it is possible to draw a line between the acceptable and unacceptable alternatives. Furthermore, in the case of euthanasia, it is possible to draw hard lines between different types of practices. For example, there is a clear distinction between voluntary and non-voluntary euthanasia, such that the arbitrary line approach cannot be applied.

== The empirical argument ==
Glover argues that the empirical argument needs to be backed by evidence, as there are situations where we do not seem to push boundaries. Generally, two examples are discussed – Action T4, the Nazi euthanasia program in Germany between 1939 and 1941, and the Groningen Protocol in the Netherlands, which has allowed for non-voluntary euthanasia of severely deformed newborns.

Lewis notes that the focus has been on voluntary to non-voluntary euthanasia, rather than physician-assisted suicide to voluntary euthanasia, as there have been no instances of the latter; in jurisdictions where physician-assisted suicide have been legalised, there have been no moves to legalise voluntary euthanasia, while jurisdictions that have legalised voluntary euthanasia also allowed physician-assisted suicide at the same time.

=== Action T4 ===
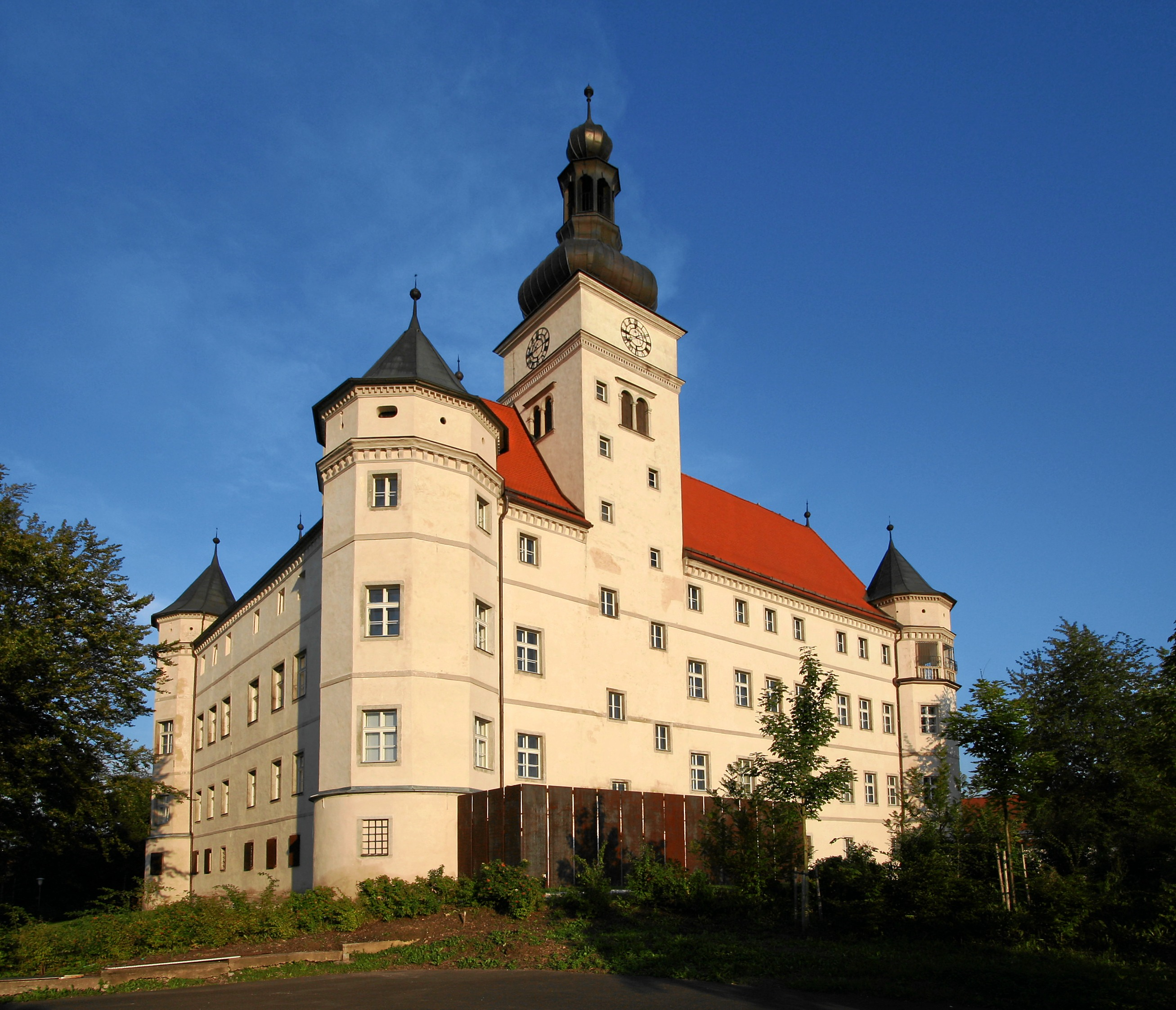
Hartheim Euthanasia Centre, where over 18,000 people were killed

Leo Alexander, in examining the events of the Holocaust during the Nuremberg Trials, stated that the origins of the Nazi programs could be traced back to "small beginnings", and presented a slippery slope argument. Others have argued that Action T4 is not an example of the empirical slippery slope, as euthanasia was still a criminal act in Germany during that time, and there is "no record of the Nazi doctors either killing or assisting in the suicide of a patient who was suffering intolerably from a fatal illness".

Euthanasia historian Ian Dowbiggin linked the Nazis' Action T4 to the resistance in the West to involuntary euthanasia. He believes that the revulsion inspired by the Nazis led to some of the early advocates of euthanasia in all its forms in the US and UK removing non-voluntary euthanasia from their proposed platforms.

=== The Groningen Protocol ===
Non-voluntary euthanasia is sometimes cited as one of the possible outcomes of the slippery slope argument, in which it is claimed that permitting voluntary euthanasia to occur will lead to the support and legalization of non-voluntary and involuntary euthanasia. Some studies of the Netherlands after the introduction of voluntary euthanasia state that there was no evidence to support this claim while other studies state otherwise.

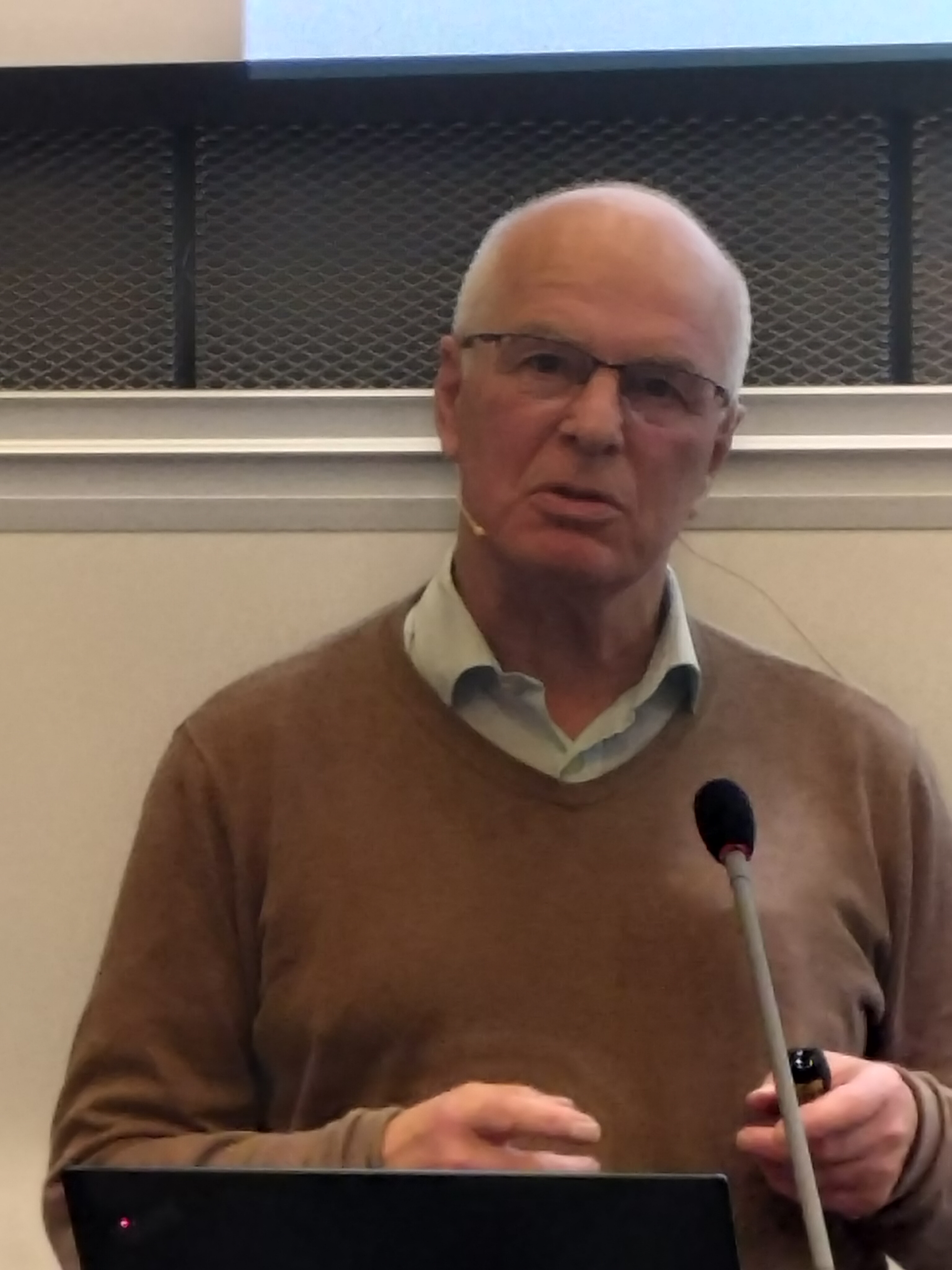
Ola Didrik Saugstad

A study from the Jakobovits Center for Medical Ethics in Israel argued that a form of non-voluntary euthanasia, the Groningen Protocol, has "potential to validate the slippery-slope argument against allowing euthanasia in selected populations". Anesthesiologist William Lanier says that the "ongoing evolution of euthanasia law in the Netherlands" is evidence that a slippery slope is "playing out in real time". Pediatrician Ola Didrik Saugstad says that while he approves of the withholding of treatment to cause the death of severely ill newborns where the prognosis is hopeless, he disagrees with the active killing of such newborns. Countering this view, professor of internal medicine Margaret Battin finds that there is a lack of evidence to support slippery slope arguments. Additionally, it is argued that the public nature of the Groningen Protocol decisions, and their evaluation by a prosecutor, prevent a "slippery slope" from occurring.

A 1999 study by Jochemsen and Keown from the Dutch Christian Lindeboom Institute published in the peer reviewed Journal of Medical Ethics, argued that euthanasia in the Netherlands is not well-controlled and that there is still a significant percentage of cases of euthanasia practiced illegally. Raanan Gillon, from the Imperial College School of Medicine, University of London commented in 1999 that "what is shown by the empirical findings is that restrictions on euthanasia that legal controls in the Netherlands were supposed to have implemented are being extensively ignored and from that point of view it is surely justifiable to conclude, as Jochemsen and Keown do conclude, that the practice of euthanasia in the Netherlands is in poor control". A similar conclusion was presented in 1997 by Herbert Hendin, who argued that the situation in The Netherlands demonstrated a slippery slope in practice, changing the attitudes of doctors over time and moving them from tightly regulated voluntary euthanasia for the terminally ill to the acceptance of euthanasia for people suffering from psychological distress, and from voluntary euthanasia to the acceptance of non-voluntary and potentially involuntary euthanasia.

An October 2007 study, published in the Journal of Medical Ethics, found that "rates of assisted dying in Oregon and in the Netherlands showed no evidence of heightened risk for the elderly, women, the uninsured (inapplicable in the Netherlands, where all are insured), people with low educational status, the poor, the physically disabled or chronically ill, minors, people with psychiatric illnesses including depression, or racial or ethnic minorities, compared with background populations. The only group with a heightened risk was people with AIDS."

A 2009 review study of euthanasia in the Netherlands concluded that no slippery slope effect has occurred, while another study of the same year found that abuse of the Dutch euthanasia system is rare. In 2010, a study found that there is no evidence that legalizing assisted suicide will lead us down the slippery slope to involuntary euthanasia.

Most critics rely predominantly on Dutch evidence of cases of "termination of life without an explicit request" as evidence for the slide from voluntary euthanasia to non-voluntary euthanasia. One commenter wrote that critics who rely on this slippery slope argument often omit two important elements, thereby using flawed logic. First, the argument is only effective against legalization if it is legalization which causes the slippery slope; and secondly, it is only effective if it is used comparatively, to show that the slope is more slippery in the Netherlands than it is in jurisdictions which have not legalized assisted suicide or euthanasia. Since these questions have not been addressed by critics, little attention has been paid to available evidence on causation and comparability.

==== Research review studies ====
In the most recent review paper on euthanasia in the Netherlands, namely the 2009 paper entitled Two Decades of Research on Euthanasia from the Netherlands. What Have We Learnt and What Questions Remain? written by researchers from the Department of Public Health in the Netherlands, it was found that "public control and transparency of the practice of euthanasia is to a large extent possible" and that "[n]o slippery slope seems to have occurred". The researchers find that the legalization of euthanasia in the Netherlands did not result in a slippery slope for medical end-of-life practices because:

1. The frequency of ending of life without explicit patient request did not increase over the studied years;
2. There is no evidence for a higher frequency of euthanasia, compared with background populations, among:
  - the elderly
  - people with low educational status
  - the poor
  - the physically disabled or chronically ill
  - minors
  - people with psychiatric illnesses including depression
  - racial or ethnic minorities.

In 2010, 4,050 persons died from euthanasia or from assisted suicide on request. According to research done by the Vrije Universiteit (Amsterdam), University Medical Center Utrecht and Statistics Netherlands, and published in The Lancet, this is not more than before the introduction of the "Termination of Life on Request and Assisted Suicide (Review Procedures) Act" in 2002. Both in the Netherlands and in Belgium, the number of termination of life without explicit request for terminally ill patients, decreased after the introduction of the legislation about the termination of life. In effect, the legislation did not lead to more cases of euthanasia and assisted suicide on request.

== See also ==
- Non-voluntary euthanasia
- Involuntary euthanasia
