= Non-voluntary euthanasia =

Ending a life without the subject's informed consent

Non-voluntary euthanasia is euthanasia conducted when the explicit consent of the individual concerned is unavailable, such as when the person is in a persistent vegetative state, or in the case of young children. It contrasts with involuntary euthanasia, when euthanasia is performed against the will of the patient.

The different possible situations considered non-voluntary euthanasia are when the decision to end the life of the patient is: 1) based on what the incapacitated individual would have wanted if they could be asked; 2) based on what the decision maker would want if he or she were in the patient's place; or 3) made by a doctor based on their own criteria and reasoning. The third scenario was perhaps most famously employed in the death of a comatose King George V via his physician, Lord Dawson of Penn.

== Euthanasia and religions ==
The Islamic religion asserts that the human person and his or her life are sacred, and that only God, who gives life, has the right to take it away. Therefore, one must act in all circumstances to preserve and conserve life. Whether it concerns one's own person (suicide) or someone else's, the act of causing death is forbidden.

Verse 5:32 of the Quran states: "We ordained for the Children of Israel that whoever takes a life—unless as a punishment for murder or mischief in the land—it will be as if they killed all of humanity; and whoever saves a life, it will be as if they saved all of humanity."

The position of the Catholic Church has not changed and evolved little since the Old Testament ban. The last Roman pontiffs have all reaffirmed the ban on euthanasia. The Encyclical Evangelium vitae of John Paul II, of March 25, 1995, is a clear and firm text: “euthanasia is therefore a crime that no human law can claim to legitimize. » Illness is always “a path of conversion” which “provokes a search for God, a return to him”. As for pain, it remains “an access to eternal salvation” and “it can now configure us to Him (Christ) and unite us to his redemptive passion. » (excerpts from the Catechism of the Catholic Church, promulgated by the Vatican in 1992, included in the Compendium of 2005, §1501 and 1505).

As recently as June of 2016, Pope Francis confirmed this position of the Church in an interview with the newspaper “Christian Family” where he declared that we should not “hide behind so-called compassion to justify and approve of death of a patient. ».

Jehovah's Witnesses hold strong anti-euthanasia policies (even in cases of terminal illness). Adherents' access to assisted dying is often strictly controlled via bureaucratic means, e.g. the Witnesses' Hospital Liaison Committees or Patient Visitation Groups.

== Legal status ==
Non-voluntary euthanasia can be divided into passive or active variants. Passive euthanasia entails the withholding of common treatments, such as antibiotics, necessary for the continuance of life. Active euthanasia entails the use of lethal substances or forces, such as administering a lethal injection, to kill and is the most controversial means. A number of authors consider these terms to be misleading and unhelpful.

Active non-voluntary euthanasia is illegal in all countries in the world, although it is practised in the Netherlands on infants (see below) under an agreement between physicians and district attorneys. Passive non-voluntary euthanasia (withholding life support) is legal in various countries, such as India, Albania, and many parts of the United States and is practiced in English hospitals.

Non-voluntary euthanasia has been heavily debated. For example, Len Doyal, a professor of medical ethics and former member of the ethics committee of the British Medical Association, argued for legalization, saying in 2006 that "[p]roponents of voluntary euthanasia should support non-voluntary euthanasia under appropriate circumstances and with proper regulation". Arguing against legalization, Peter Saunders, campaign director for Care Not Killing, an alliance of Christian and disability groups, called Doyal's proposals "the very worst form of medical paternalism whereby doctors can end the lives of patients after making a judgment that their lives are of no value and claim that they are simply acting in their patients' best interests".

== Slippery slope debate ==
Non-voluntary euthanasia is cited as one of the possible outcomes of the slippery slope argument against euthanasia, in which it is claimed that permitting voluntary euthanasia to occur will lead to the support and legalization of non-voluntary and involuntary euthanasia, although other ethicists have contested this idea.

== Non-voluntary euthanasia in the Netherlands ==
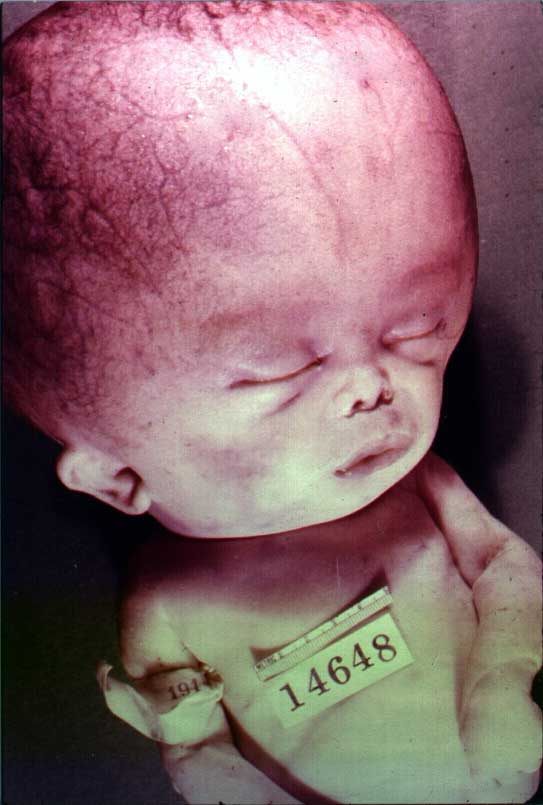
Severe hydrocephalus. Infants like this can be subject to non-voluntary euthanasia in the Netherlands if the parents and doctors decide it is the best choice for their child. In other jurisdictions, the doctors involved may be prosecuted.

Permitted euthanasia in the Netherlands has been regulated by law since 2002. It states that euthanasia and physician-assisted suicide are not punishable if the attending physician acts in accordance with criteria of due care. Prior to the establishment of that law, euthanasia and assisted suicide in the Netherlands were already tolerated for many years, as for example described by G. van der Wal and R. J. Dillmann in 1994. In a 1994 study, of the studied 5000 requests in the Netherlands, in about 1000 of the cases, doctors prescribed drugs with the explicit goal of shortening the patient's life without the explicit request of the patient, which can be considered cases of non-voluntary euthanasia.

Since 2004, the Netherlands, also has a protocol to be followed in cases of euthanasia on children under the age of 12 (see also below), which was ratified by the Dutch National Association of Pediatricians, although the practice remains technically illegal. Together with colleagues and prosecutors, Eduard Verhagen developed the Groningen Protocol, in which cases prosecutors will refrain from pressing charges.

== Non-voluntary euthanasia on children ==
=== Newborns and euthanasia ===
Active euthanasia on newborns is illegal throughout the world, with the de facto exception of the Netherlands mentioned above. Because a newborn child is never able to speak for themselves, euthanasia on newborns is by definition non-voluntary. An early example of documented cases of child euthanasia are those performed by the surgeon Harry J. Haiselden in Chicago in the early 20th century.

=== Ancient Greece ===
In ancient Greece, non-voluntary euthanasia of children was practiced as an early form of eugenics, the belief and practice of improving the genetic quality of the human population, usually by withdrawing care (i.e. passive euthanasia) rather than a physical extermination, an act termed as “exposure”.

== See also ==
- Child euthanasia in Nazi Germany
- Coup de grâce
- Death of King George V

- Bertrand Dawson, 1st Viscount Dawson of Penn

- Eugenics
