= After-Birth Abortion =

Controversial comparison of abortion and euthanasia

"After-Birth Abortion: Why Should the Baby Live?" is a controversial article published by Francesca Minerva and Alberto Giubilini. Available online from 2012 and published in the Journal of Medical Ethics in 2013, it argues to call infanticide "after-birth abortion" and highlights similarities between abortion and euthanasia. The main argument of the article is that infanticide should be considered permissible in all cases where abortion is deemed acceptable, including those involving non-disabled and healthy infants.

The article attracted media attention, including threats to its authors, as well as several scholarly critiques. Michael Tooley summarised the criticism and controversy, saying: "Very few philosophical publications, however, have evoked either more widespread attention, or emotionally more heated reactions, than this article has."

== Overview ==
The argument of the "After-Birth Abortion" article is as follows:

1. Abortion is justified because of the moral status of foetuses; their shared status of potential persons is not morally relevant.
2. Abortion is justified when the foetus has severe abnormalities or would be an intolerable burden to its mother and family, at least when adoption is not a viable option due to not being in the best interests of actual persons.
3. Newborns have the same moral status as foetuses (there are no morally relevant differences between them) if they suffer unbearably.
4. Newborns may be born with severe abnormalities that cannot always be diagnosed before birth, and can be an intolerable burden on their mother and family, including when circumstances change after birth.
5. Therefore "after-birth abortion" (euthanasia of newborns) can be justified in some circumstances. These circumstances include, according to the authors: if a disease was not detected during pregnancy, if something went wrong during delivery, or if there are changes in the family's economic, social, or psychological circumstances. The authors argue that even a newborn child without any disabilities may be euthanised under these circumstances.

In the words of Bertha Alvarez Manninen, in a paper also written in the Journal of Medical Ethics, "Alberto Giubilini and Francesca Minerva argue that because there are no significant differences between a fetus and a neonate, in that neither possess sufficiently robust mental traits to qualify as persons, a neonate may be justifiably killed for any reason that also justifies abortion. To further emphasise their view that a newly born infant is more on a par with a fetus rather than a more developed baby, Giubilini and Minerva elect to call this 'after-birth abortion' rather than infanticide. ... I argue that their thesis is incorrect, and that the moral permissibility of abortion does not entail the moral permissibility of 'after-birth' abortion."

Abortion is the ending of an ongoing process before its completion, and, in the case of Giubilini and Minerva, it refers to ending the process of pregnancy after its natural conclusion of birth, thus making "after-birth abortion" a self-contradictory phrase, since birth ends the pregnancy leaving no pregnancy to be aborted. Some critics argue that the term was coined by Giubilini and Minerva as a way to avoid the more direct term infanticide, which in many countries is treated as a crime comparable in severity and consequence to murder or manslaughter. Another critical article concluded that "having investigated the new concept we have concluded that the term 'after-birth abortion' is biologically and conceptually nonsensical".
