= Centre of Expertise on Euthanasia =

Mobile euthanasia clinic in the Netherlands

Centre of Expertise on Euthanasia Expertisecentrum Euthanasie

Geography
- Location: Mobile clinic (no location), Netherlands

Organisation
- Religious affiliation: none

Services
- Beds: 0

History
- Former name: Levenseindekliniek
- Opened: 2012

Links
- Website: expertisecentrumeuthanasie.nl/en/ (in Dutch) (in English)
- Lists: Hospitals in Netherlands

Centre of Expertise on Euthanasia (Dutch: Expertisecentrum Euthanasie, until September 2019 known as Levenseindekliniek) is a Dutch virtual euthanasia clinic. The clinic was established in 2012. In that same year, 32 people received euthanasia by the clinic. In 2023, the centre performed euthanasia 1,269 times, while there had been 4,508 requests, so 72% of the requests had been rejected. The centre doesn't have a physical place to perform euthanasia, because of that, the operations are done in the patients residences, such as their homes, nursing homes, hospitals or hospices. The clinic only helps people who have a Dutch residential address.
