= Assisted dying =

Medical aid in dying

Assisted dying, assisted death, aid in dying, medical aid in dying, medical assistance in dying (MAiD) or help to die is the involvement of healthcare professionals in the provision of lethal drugs intended to end a patient's life, subject to eligibility criteria and safeguards.

Assisted dying is a broad term, which encompasses:

- Assisted suicide, the practice of helping or assisting another person to end their own life
- Euthanasia, the practice of intentionally ending someone's life to relieve pain and suffering
- Palliative sedation, the use of sedative medications to relieve symptoms, which may accelerate the death of the patient

== See also ==
- Right to die
- Dignified death
- Assisted dying in Australia
- Assisted dying in Canada
- Assisted dying in Luxembourg
- Assisted dying in the Netherlands
- Assisted dying in New Zealand
- Assisted dying in Spain
- Assisted dying in the United Kingdom
