= Eduard Verhagen =

Dutch physician and attorney

- Born: May 3, 1962 (age 64); Haarlem, Netherlands
- Occupations: Attorney, Medical Director
- Known for: Development and advocacy of the Groningen Protocol for infant euthanasia
- Medical career
- Profession: Pediatrician
- Field: Medicine, Law
- Institutions: University Medical Center Groningen (UMCG)
- Sub-specialties: Pediatrics
- Notable works: Co-authored article on the Groningen Protocol in the New England Journal of Medicine (2005)

Eduard Verhagen (born 3 May 1962, Haarlem) is an attorney and the medical director of the department of pediatrics at the University Medical Center Groningen (UMCG). He is mainly known for his involvement in infant euthanasia in the Netherlands.

Euthanasia is legal for patients over the age of 12 in the Netherlands. Verhagen, who studied both law and medicine, worked out a protocol with prosecutors and doctors in 2002 for infant euthanasia cases. This Groningen Protocol requires that the parents and teams of physicians and social workers agree that further treatment is futile. After a waiting period of several days, during which the parents can think over the decision and say goodbye, euthanasia is performed. The case records are subsequently turned over to the prosecutor's office. If this protocol is followed, prosecutors will refrain from pressing charges. In July 2005, this protocol was introduced nationwide in the Netherlands.

In 2005, the New England Journal of Medicine published an article by Verhagen and his colleague Pieter Sauer outlining their protocol and documenting 22 cases of infant euthanasia that had been reported to the authorities between 1997 and 2004, with four of them occurring under Verhagen's supervision at his hospital. Verhagen and Sauer said the essay was intended to address "blood-chilling accounts and misunderstandings."

As his motive, Verhagen states that he believes euthanasia to be justified in cases of unbearable suffering, and that it is an important decision that should only happen as the result of an open and honest discussion among the involved parties, rather than as a lone decision of a doctor who is afraid of the consequences. However, the Groningen Protocol is extremely controversial. Among others, Dr Rob de Jong openly questions the criteria used in the Groningen protocol, especially "unbearable suffering" and the "expected quality of life" in a critical appraisal. Another important argument against the Groningen protocol is that the 22 cases described are all children with spina bifida, which is not considered a lethal disability. Erick Kodish has also harshly criticized the protocol and its premises in an article published in The Lancet where he has concluded inviting to resistance by means of civil disobedience against the medical institutionalization of infanticide.

== Selected works ==
- Regulations regarding medical decisions at the end of life of severely ill newborns in the Netherlands, in: Robertson-von Trotha, Caroline Y. (ed.): Tod und Sterben in der Gegenwartsgesellschaft. Eine interdisziplinäre Auseinandersetzung (= Kulturwissenschaft interdisziplinär/Interdisciplinary Studies on Culture and Society, Vol. 3), Baden-Baden 2008

== Sources ==
- Crouch, Gregory. "A Crusade Born of a Suffering Infant's Cry". The New York Times, March 19, 2005.
- Schwartz, John. When Torment Is Baby's Destiny, Euthanasia Is Defended, The New York Times, March 10, 2005.
