= Child euthanasia =

Euthanasia applied to gravely ill children

Child euthanasia is a form of euthanasia that is applied to children who are gravely ill or have significant birth defects. In 2005, the Netherlands became the first country since the fall of Nazi Germany to decriminalize euthanasia for infants with a hopeless prognosis and unrelievable pain. Nine years later, Belgium amended its 2002 Euthanasia Act to extend the rights of euthanasia to minors. Like adult euthanasia, there is world-wide public controversy and ethical debate over the moral, philosophical, and religious issues of child euthanasia.

== Modern history ==
=== Nazi Germany ===
A 24 July 1939 killing of a severely disabled infant in Nazi Germany was described in a BBC "Genocide Under the Nazis Timeline" as the first "state-sponsored euthanasia". Parties that consented to the killing included Hitler's office, the parents, and the Reich Committee for the Scientific Registration of Serious and Congenitally Based Illnesses. The Telegraph noted that the killing of the disabled infant—whose name was Gerhard Kretschmar, born blind, with missing limbs, subject to convulsions, and reportedly "an idiot"— provided "the rationale for a secret Nazi decree that led to 'mercy killings' of almost 300,000 mentally and physically handicapped people". While Kretschmar's killing received parental consent, most of the 5,000 to 8,000 children killed afterwards were forcibly taken from their parents.

=== Groningen Protocol ===
Bente Hindriks, born in 2001 at Groningen University Medical Center in the Netherlands, was immediately diagnosed at birth with the rare genetic disorder Hallopeau-Siemens syndrome. The disease features chronic blistering and peeling of the epidermis and mucous membranes. There is no effective treatment, and the damage on the top layer of the skin comes with severe, unmitigated pain. Hindriks's diagnosis was impossible to treat and her prognosis of skin cancer would take her life in five to six years. Her pediatrician, Dr. Eduard Verhagen, could do nothing to help. Though illegal at the time, Hindriks's parents wished to end her suffering with active euthanasia. Ultimately, it is believed that the high dose of morphine that Dr. Verhagen administered to ease her pain killed Bente.

Four years after Bente Hindriks' death, Dr. Verhagen began campaigning for policy change that called for permitting infant euthanasia under specifically strict guidelines. While engaged in this pursuit, Dr. Verhagen publicly stated that he terminated the lives of four more infants, all with severe cases of spina bifida. Called "Dr. Death" and "a second Hitler" by some, he continued along with his hope for a "nationwide protocol that allows each pediatrician this delicate question with due care, knowing he followed the criteria," to end his patients' lives simply out of compassion. He felt that strict regulations on infant euthanasia would prevent uncontrolled and unjustified instances of euthanasia. In 2005, Dr. Verhagen and Dr. Sauer, with a team of prosecutors, formalized the Groningen Protocol.

The agreement follows that no charges shall be pressed against physicians who perform end-of-life procedures on infants who meet the following five criteria:

1. The infant's diagnosis and prognosis must be certain.
2. The infant must be experiencing hopeless and unbearable suffering.
3. At least one independent physician must confirm that the first two conditions are met.
4. Both parents must give their consent.
5. The termination procedure must be performed in accord with the accepted medical standard.

Furthermore, neonates and infants who might be considered candidates for end-of-life decisions are divided into three categories:

1. Infants with no chance of survival who are likely to die soon after birth, even if they receive the best medical and surgical care available.
2. Infants who are sustained by intensive care but have a bleak prognosis.
3. Infants who have a hopeless prognosis and experience unbearable suffering.

=== Belgium ===
Belgium legalized euthanasia for terminally ill adults in 2002. As it stood then, euthanasia could only be applied to citizens over eighteen years of age or, in rare accounts, a category of individuals called "emancipated minors." In years to follow, the debate on euthanasia opened up to the idea of this same law being extended to minors. On February 13, 2014, an amendment to the 2002 Euthanasia Act made it legally permissible for minors, regardless of age, to pursue euthanasia as long as they fit a few specific criteria. The amendment states that minors who request euthanasia must exhibit the ability to judge their current state of affairs when in a "medically futile condition of constant and unbearable physical suffering that cannot be alleviated and that will, within a short period of time, result in death, and results from serious and incurable disorder caused by illness or accident."

The provisions of this amendment to the 2002 Euthanasia Act have distinguishable differences between the act applied to adults and minors. First, the law establishes that only physical suffering may be valid for minors, while physical and psychological suffering is plausible reasoning for adults and the "emancipated minors" to pursue end-of-life care by euthanasia. Second, it states that the presumed death of a minor should result within a short period of time, whereas no timeframe of expected death is needed for adult cases. Finally, it requires that multiple physicians and legal representatives sign-off on the mental capacity of the patient, reinforcing that the minor is competent of their condition and decision to die.

== Ethical debate ==
The concept of child euthanasia has sparked heavy debate. The ethical debate can be broken down into two categories:

1. Euthanasia reserved for neonates and infants.
2. Euthanasia reserved for minors.

=== Euthanasia for neonates and infants ===
==== Groningen Protocol ====
Dr. Eduard Verhagen, who developed the Groningen Protocol, has made clear his stance in endorsing the motivation for the protocol. Verhagen clarifies that his protocol does not include infants with ordinary, and otherwise, treatable conditions. Rather, the protocol was created to relieve the burden that both the infant and its parents would face in a "life of agonizing pain." Others, such as Joseph Fletcher, founder of situational ethics and a euthanasia proponent, proposed that infanticide be permitted in cases of severe birth defects. Fletcher says that unlike the sort of infanticide perpetrated by very disturbed people, in such cases child euthanasia could be considered humane; a logical and acceptable extension of abortion. Bioethicists Alberto Giubilini and Francesca Minerva go one step further, arguing that killing a newborn "should be permissible in all the cases where abortion is, including cases where the newborn is not disabled."

Dr. Alan Jotkowitz, professor of medicine at Ben-Gurion University of the Negev, argues strongly against the Groningen Protocol on the basis that idea of a "life not worth living" does not exist. He claims that nowhere in the protocol does it mention only pertaining to terminally ill infants and the developers of the protocol value the future quality of life more than the current being of the infant. Jotkowitz also draws comparisons to the practice of child euthanasia employed by Nazi rule through the 1940s. Eric Kodish and Daniel A. Beals have compared child euthanasia to infanticide. Kodish says "the very notion that there is an "accepted medical standard" for infanticide calls for resistance in the form of civil disobedience."

Dr. Alexander A. Kon, a national leader in pediatric critical care medicine and bioethics at University of California San Diego School of Medicine, outlines that the ethical implications for neonatal euthanasia lies in the lack of "self-determination" for infants compared to adults. Kon states, therefore, justification must solely be on the basis of the patient's well-being. Though not asserting his position on the Groningen Protocol, Kon's concerns center around the use of paralytic agents in Verhagen's infants. As reported by Verhagen, "neuromuscular blockers were added shortly before death in 5 cases to prevent gasping, mostly on parental request." According to Kon, the practice of making euthanasia more palatable with these agents is something that cannot be justified though he does believe that those in support of neonatal euthanasia have motivations to genuinely help infants the best they can.

==== Parental consent and physician duty ====
Generally, when a newborn's life is contested, the parents are the ones who determine their child's future. The parents and the doctor both take part in making the decision. When there is persistent disagreement, the case may be taken to court where the decision is made. Considerations include the cost of treatment and the newborn's quality of life. The cost of the treatment includes medical resources and their availability. The newborn's quality of life will depend on whether the treatment is applied, continued or ceased, which can result in passive euthanasia. This can also be classified as a crime under certain laws without the approval of parents. There are ongoing debates about parents' roles in choosing euthanasia for their children, and whether this is considered voluntary euthanasia or non-voluntary euthanasia. If considered voluntary euthanasia, it is because the parents authorized it and they have a say in the life of their children. Alternatively, if considered non-voluntary euthanasia, it is because the infant is not capable of providing patient consent to the procedure.

American bioethicist Jacob M. Appel argues that pediatric euthanasia may be ethical even in the absence of parental consent. Dr. Douglas S. Diekema, most known for his role in the Ashley Treatment, argues that in cases where parents act against the best interests of their child, that the state should have ability to intervene. Diekema continues on his support of the Harm Principle being the basis for state intervention, which would allow physicians of the state to override the decisions made by parents if it is determined that their position does not represent the best interests of their child, and rather, is the more harmful procedure.

=== Euthanasia for minors ===
Extension of the 2002 Euthanasia Act to Belgian minors received both heavy criticism and large applause, launching another ethical debate centered around child euthanasia. Luc Bovens, professor of philosophy at the London School of Economics, explains the three fields of thought opposing this amendment to the 2002 Euthanasia Act. First, some believe that euthanasia is morally impermissible in general. Second, some believe the law was sufficient as is, and that hospital ethics boards should deal with the "emancipated minors" on a case-by-case event. Third, some believe euthanasia for minors is more impermissible than adults. Bovens outlines the five most used arguments in support of this third point:

1. Weightiness: We do not allow minors to vote or buy cigarettes, so why should we allow them to make decisions about life and death?
2. Capability of Discernment: Minors are not capable of judging what is best for them.
3. Pressure: Minors will be pressured by parents into deciding for euthanasia since it may be best for the parents' emotional or financial needs.
4. Sensitivity: Minors may unduly wish to satisfy parental expectations or reduce parental stress.
5. Sufficient Palliative Care: Physical suffering at the end of one's life can be attenuated by palliative care, and it is the poor state of palliative care that encourages patient requests for euthanasia.

Bovens believes these five arguments do not carry much weight in the debate; however, he does support arguments defending the wish to retain age restriction and ownership of hospital ethics boards in dealing with individual requests from minors.

Proponents of the new law argue this amendment helps avoid discrimination, clarifies legal matters and improves consistency in medical practice and decision-making. Previously, euthanasia could be performed for "emancipated minors," but not for minors deemed non-emancipated though otherwise competent. Those favoring child euthanasia viewed this to be unfair, stating that the non-emancipated minors may be similar in levels of competence to emancipated minors, and thus, suffering to the same extent. Verhagen supports this, with the claim that an age restriction of a certain number of years is arbitrary in nature, and that "self-determination knows no age limit." Furthermore, proponents believe the extension will clarify the legality of the matter for physicians who are treating terminally ill minors, resulting in less unlawful behavior and more consistency in medical decision-making.

== Physician sentiment ==
A major challenge for physicians tasked with the medical decision-making of babies born very premature or severely disabled with neurological damage and poor quality of life for the future presents another side to the bioethics topic of child euthanasia. A 2017 study looked into the end-of-life decisions made by neonatologists in Argentina. The questionnaire investigated the method of their actions in response to critical neonates. The results showed that more than 75% of the neonatologists would initiate treatment in premature infants of unknown prognosis, based on newborn viability. It followed that more than 80% of physicians withdrew treatment which yielded no positive outcomes. Silberberg and Gallo's analysis showed the current sentiment of physicians with respect to infant euthanasia apply some variation of therapeutic activism, yet the large majority of those same doctors will withdraw life-preserving treatments when no advancements are made.

== Religious views ==
Morals derived through religious scripts and teachings largely influence views on euthanasia. A recent psychological study in Belgium showed that people who disapprove the legalization of child euthanasia tend to be religious, have low flexibility in existential issues, endorse collectivistic morality (values of loyalty and purity), and/or express ingroup-oriented prosocial inclinations.

== Child euthanasia by country ==
=== Belgium ===
On February 13, 2014, Belgium became the first country to allow voluntary child euthanasia without any age restriction. However, a child must ask for the procedure and verify that they understand what will happen. The parents must also consent to euthanasia of the child. The child's doctor must confirm that they are "in a hopeless medical situation of constant and unbearable suffering that cannot be eased and which will cause death in the short term." As of 2018, three children have died by euthanasia in Belgium.

=== Netherlands ===
Euthanasia is currently legal in the Netherlands for children between 12 and 16 years old, with mandatory consent from the patient and their parents. Children between 16 and 18 years old do not need consent from their parents, but the parents should be included in the decision-making process. It is also legal for babies up to a year old with parental consent. The patient must be enduring "unbearable and endless suffering" and at least two doctors must agree to the procedure. Eduard Verhagen has documented several cases of infant euthanasia. Together with colleagues and prosecutors, he has developed a protocol to be followed in those cases. Prosecutors will refrain from pressing charges if this "Groningen Protocol" is followed.

This Protocol prompted a very critical response from Elio Sgreccia, the head of the Pontifical Academy for Life.

=== United Kingdom ===
The Nuffield Council on Bioethics launched an enquiry in 2006 into critical care in fetal and neonatal medicine, looking at the ethical, social and legal issues which may arise when making decisions surrounding treating extremely premature babies.

The Royal College of Obstetricians and Gynaecologists recommended that a public debate be started around the options of "non-resuscitation, withdrawal of treatment decisions, the best interests test and active euthanasia" for "the sickest of newborns". The college stated that there should be discussion over whether "deliberate intervention" to cause death in severely disabled newborn babies should be legalised; it stated that while it was not necessarily in favour of the move, it felt the issues should be debated. The college stated in this submission that having these options would save some families from years of emotional and financial suffering; it might also reduce the number of late abortions, "as some parents would be more confident about continuing a pregnancy and taking a risk on outcome". In response to this proposal, Pieter Sauer, a senior paediatrician in the Netherlands, argued that British neonatologists already perform "mercy killings" and should be allowed to do so openly.

The Church of England submission to the enquiry supported the view that doctors should be given the right to withhold treatment from seriously disabled newborn babies in exceptional circumstances, and the Christian Medical Fellowship stated that when treatment would be "a burden" this was not euthanasia.

=== United States ===
In the United States, euthanasia remains illegal for all children regardless of age.

==== Dr. Haiselden and Baby Bollinger ====
Baby Bollinger was born in 1915 at the German-American Hospital in Chicago, Illinois. Characterized by various physical abnormalities, surgeon Harry J. Haiselden advised the Bollinger parents to forgo the surgery that could have saved the baby's life. Dr. Haiselden believed it is "our duty to defend ourselves and future generations against the mentally defective." Five days after foregoing surgery, Baby Bollinger died.

Haiselden, then, brought this case to the public through a press conference and argued in defense of the Bollinger case: first, a merciful death is more humane than a life of suffering, and second, it is our responsibility to protect our society from the burden of certain disabilities. Haiselden drew supporters and critics alike through his support for euthanasia in the United States. Unlike Jack Kevorkian, Haiselden did not assist patients who wished to be euthanized. Instead, Haiselden chose to euthanize babies who were born with deformities and began advocating aggressively. Following the Bollinger case, Haiselden began withholding life-saving treatment from other disabled babies, in addition to campaigning for the euthanizing of the terminally ill.

==== Baby Doe regulations ====
On April 9, 1982, in Bloomington, Indiana, "Baby Doe" was born with Down syndrome and a tracheoesophogeal fistula (TEF). While knowing surgical intervention to resolve the TEF is a relatively standard procedure and essential to live, the baby's parents and obstetrician chose against it. This decision, met with resistance from other attending physicians, ultimately led to a court trial. The court determined that the parents were free to decline the surgery their baby needed because of mixed expert opinions of the hospital doctors. Baby Doe died six days later. This case quickly became a nationwide debate in the U.S. and garnered the attention from then U.S. Surgeon General, Dr. C. Everett Koop. Koop, a pro-life proponent and retired pediatric surgeon, condemned the court ruling.

One year later, the Reagan administration orchestrated new regulation creating the "Baby Doe Squads" and toll-free hotline to answer any complaint concerning potential abuse of a disabled infant. Known as the Baby Doe regulations, these were eventually overturned. In 1984, Congress legislated additional amendments to the Child Abuse Protection and Treatment Act (CAPTA) outlawing the withholding of necessity-based medical care, specifically noting "appropriate nutrition, hydration, and medication," from disabled neonates unless "(A) the infant is chronically and irreversibly comatose; (B) the provision of such treatment would (i) merely prolong dying, (ii) not be effective in ameliorating or correcting all of the infant's life-threatening conditions, or (iii) otherwise be futile in terms of the survival of the infant; or (C) the provision of such treatment would be virtually futile in terms of the survival of the infant and the treatment itself under such circumstances would be inhumane."

== See also ==
- Non-voluntary euthanasia
- Child euthanasia in Nazi Germany
- Joseph Maraachli case
- Robert Latimer
- The Giver
- Infanticide
- Neonaticide
