= Groningen Protocol =

Medical protocol for child euthanasia

In the Netherlands, the Groningen Protocol is a medical protocol containing directives with criteria under which physicians can perform "active ending of life on infants" (child euthanasia) without fear of legal prosecution. The protocol was developed in September 2004 by Eduard Verhagen, the medical director of the department of pediatrics at the University Medical Center Groningen (UMCG) in Groningen, the Netherlands.

Euthanasia of children under the age of 12 remains technically illegal in the Netherlands; however, Dr. Eduard Verhagen has documented several cases and, together with colleagues and prosecutors, has developed a protocol to be followed in those cases. Prosecutors refrain from pressing charges if this Groningen Protocol is followed.

== Origin ==
The protocol was created by a committee of physicians and others at the University Medical Center Groningen, in consultation with the Groningen district attorney, and has been ratified by the Dutch National Association of Pediatricians.

According to its authors, the Groningen Protocol was developed to assist with the decision-making process when considering actively ending the life of a newborn, by providing the information required to assess the situation within a legal and medical framework. In July 2005 the protocol was declared to be mandatory by the Dutch Society for Pediatrics.

== Protocol ==
The protocol, drawn up after extensive consultation between physicians, lawyers, parents and the Prosecution Office, offers procedures and guidelines to achieve the correct decision and performance. The final decision about "active ending of life on infants" is not in the hands of the physicians but with the parents, with physicians and social workers agreeing to it. Criteria are, amongst others, "unbearable suffering" and "expected quality of life". Only the parents may initiate the procedure. The procedure is reported to be working well.

For the Dutch public prosecutor, the termination of a child's life (under age 1) is acceptable if four requirements were properly fulfilled:

1. The presence of hopeless and unbearable suffering.
2. The consent of the parents to termination of life.
3. Medical consultation having taken place.
4. Careful execution of the termination.

Doctors who end the life of a baby must report the death to the local medical examiner, who in turn reports it to both the district attorney and to a review committee. The procedure differs in this respect from the black-letter law governing voluntary euthanasia. There, the medical examiner sends the report only to the regional review committee, which alerts the district attorney only if it judges that the physician acted improperly.

== Legal status ==
The Dutch euthanasia laws require individuals to request euthanasia themselves (voluntary euthanasia), which is fully legalized for people aged 12 years and older. In the Netherlands, active termination of life remains punishable under the penal code for patients under the age of 12, but it is officially permitted in practice because physicians are protected from prosecution if they follow strict national regulations.

For infants (under 1 year of age), this is governed by the Groningen Protocol (2005). As of February 1, 2024, the Dutch government implemented a specific regulation formally allowing the termination of life for seriously ill children aged 1 to 12. Like the Groningen Protocol, this is not a direct amendment to the penal code, but rather a medical force majeure arrangement that instructs the Public Prosecution Service not to prosecute doctors who adhere to this regulation.

== Review ==
In 2005 a review study was undertaken of all 22 reported cases between 1997 and 2004. All cases concerned newborns with spina bifida and hydrocephalus. In all cases, at least 2 doctors were consulted outside the medical team. In 17 of 22 cases, a multidisciplinary spina bifida team was consulted. All parents consented to the termination of life; in 4 cases they explicitly requested it. The mean time between reporting of the case and the decision concerning prosecution was 5.3 months. None of the cases led to prosecution. The study concluded that all cases of active termination of life reported were found to be in accordance with good practice.

== Reception ==
The protocol is controversial and has been attacked by anti-euthanasia campaigner Wesley J. Smith, Senior Fellow at the conservative think tank Discovery Institute, who described it as an attempt to legalize infanticide.

Several studies have questioned the basis for the protocol and have recommended abandoning it; however, bioethicist Jacob M. Appel of New York University has said that the protocol is a success and should be expanded. Hilde Lindemann and Marian Verkerk said that the policy must be evaluated in the context of Dutch culture and medicine, but Eric Kodish has harshly criticized the protocol and its premises in an article published in The Lancet. Kodish concluded by inviting resistance to the protocol by means of civil disobedience against the medical institutionalization of infanticide.

== See also ==
- Futile medical care
