= Involuntary euthanasia =

Illegal practice of intentionally ending a life against the subject's will

Involuntary euthanasia, typically regarded as a type of murder, occurs when euthanasia is performed on a person who would be able to provide informed consent, but does not, either because they do not want to die, or because they were not asked.

Involuntary euthanasia is contrasted with voluntary euthanasia (euthanasia performed with the patient's consent) and non-voluntary euthanasia (when the patient is unable to give informed consent, for example when a patient is comatose or a child). Involuntary euthanasia is widely opposed and is regarded as a crime in all legal jurisdictions. Involuntary euthanasia has been practiced in the past, notably in Nazi Germany, where many of the perpetrators were tried, convicted, and executed following World War II. Reference to it or fear of it is sometimes used as a reason for not changing laws relating to voluntary euthanasia.

== History of involuntary euthanasia ==
=== United States ===
Euthanasia became a subject of public discussion in the United States at the turn of the 20th century. Felix Adler, a prominent educator and scholar, issued the first authoritative call in 1891 for the provision of lethal drugs to terminally ill patients who requested to die. In 1906, Ohio considered a law to legalize such a form of euthanasia, but it did not make it out of committee. While much of the debate focused on voluntary euthanasia, other calls for involuntary euthanasia were vocalized as well. In 1900, W. Duncan McKim, a New York physician and author published a book titled Heredity and Human Progress. This book suggested that people with severe inherited defects, including mentally handicapped people, epileptics, habitual drunks and criminals, should be given a quick and painless death by "carbonic gas".

In January 1938, the National Society for the Legalization of Euthanasia was formed, and was renamed the Euthanasia Society of America (ESA) later that year. It advocated for the legalization of euthanasia in the United States, primarily by lobbying state legislators. Many prominent ESA members advocated for involuntary euthanasia of people with mental disabilities, including Ann Mitchell, a former asylum patient and main financial supporter of the ESA until her suicide in 1942. Ann Mitchell is also credited with structuring the ESA as a eugenics project. ESA’s first president was Charles Potter, an ex-Baptist minister who advocated for coercive eugenic sterilization and involuntary euthanasia.

The ESA initially advocated for both voluntary and involuntary euthanasia of people with severe disabilities. The organization soon realized that involuntary euthanasia had negative connotations, particularly its association with the Nazis' euthanasia program, and began advocating for voluntary euthanasia exclusively.

=== Nazi Germany ===
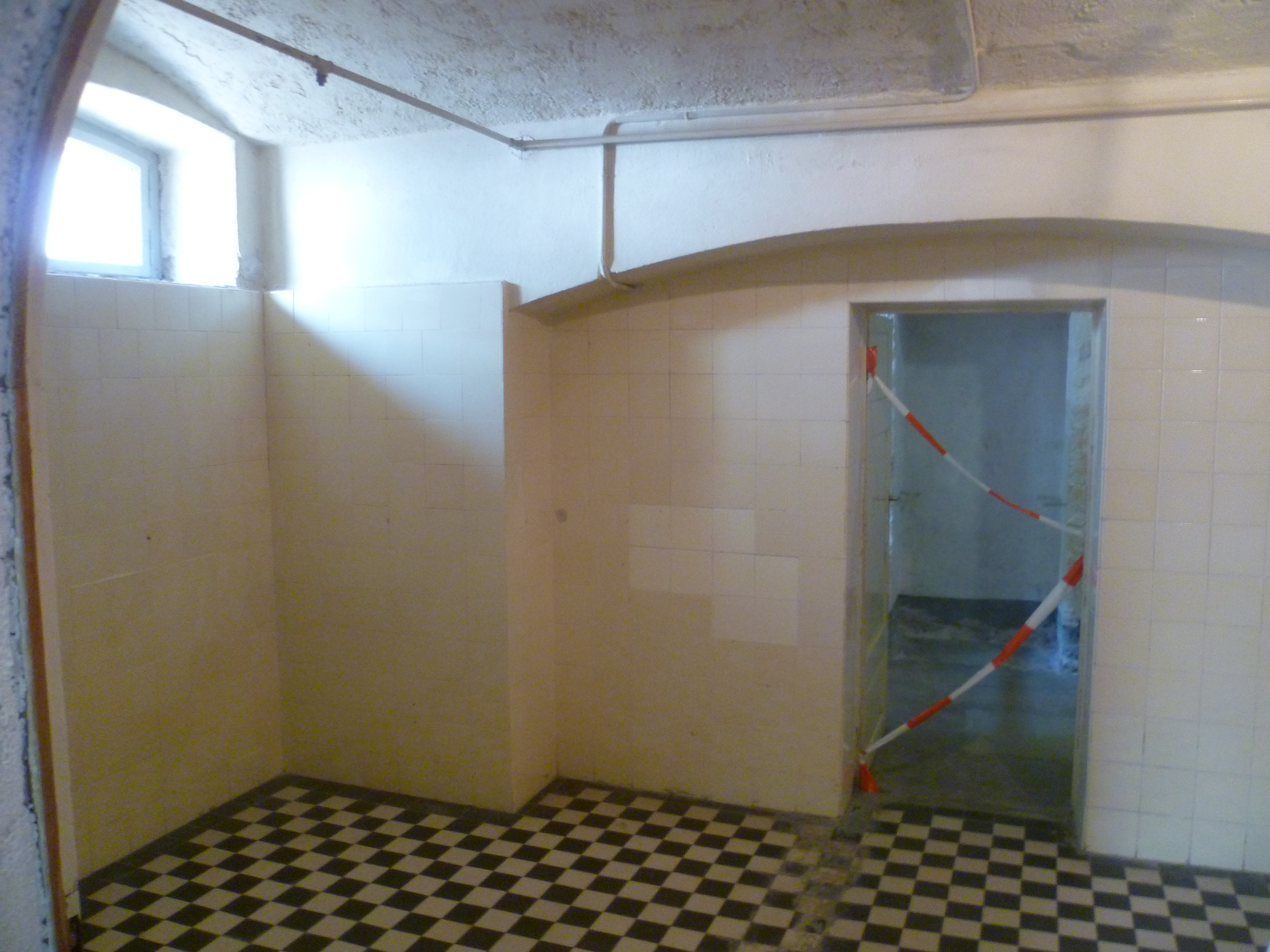
Gas chamber in Hadamar Killing Facility

Adolf Hitler enacted the Aktion T4 program in October 1939 to murder "incurably ill, physically or mentally disabled, emotionally distraught, and elderly people". The Aktion T4 program was also designed to kill those who were deemed "inferior and threatening to the well being of the Aryan race". This program was also designed as part of a larger, "Final Solution" eugenics program. Within months of enactment, the Nazis expanded its definition of who could be killed to include those who were of a certain ethnicity as well as class. Six killing centers were established for T4, one of the most notable being at Hadamar. At these centers, people deemed "handicapped" or "unfit" by "medical experts" were murdered. For example, gas chambers were disguised to look like showers and some people (particularly children) were starved to death. Often at these centers, the victims were murdered together in gas chambers using carbon monoxide. The research undertaken by the Nazis on the victims was used as a prototype for extermination camps such as Auschwitz and Treblinka later on in the war. Approximately 200,000 people were murdered in the six years of the T4 program. The T4 "euthanasia" institutions were shut down by Allied troops in 1945. Following the war, many T4 personnel were tried at the Doctors' Trial, one of the subsequent Nuremberg trials. Seven of the accused were sentenced to death by hanging, five were sentenced to life imprisonment, and four were given prison sentences from 10 to 20 years.

== See also ==
- Aruna Shanbaug case
- Capital punishment
- Child euthanasia in Nazi Germany
- Coup de grâce
- Eugenics
- Euthanasia in Canada
