= Euthanasia =

Intentionally ending a life to relieve pain and suffering

Euthanasia (pronounced [/eu̯.tʰa.naˈsi.a/]; Greek: εὐθανασία, lit. 'good death'; εὖ, eu, lit. 'well' or 'good' + θάνατος, thanatos, 'death') is the practice of intentionally ending life to eliminate pain and suffering.

Different countries have different euthanasia laws. The British House of Lords select committee on medical ethics defines euthanasia as "a deliberate intervention undertaken with the express intention of ending a life to relieve intractable suffering". In the Netherlands and Belgium, euthanasia is understood as "termination of life by a doctor at the request of a patient". The Dutch law, however, does not use the term 'euthanasia' but includes the concept under the broader definition of "assisted suicide and termination of life on request".

Euthanasia is categorised in different ways, which include voluntary, non-voluntary, and involuntary. Voluntary euthanasia is when a person wishes to have their life ended and is legal in a growing number of countries. Non-voluntary euthanasia occurs when a patient's consent is unavailable, (e.g., comatose or under a persistent-vegetative state,) and is legal in some countries under certain limited conditions, in both active and passive forms. Involuntary euthanasia, which is done without asking for consent or against the patient's will, is illegal in all countries and is usually considered murder.

As of 2006, euthanasia had become the most active area of research in bioethics. In some countries, divisive public controversy occurs over the moral, ethical, and legal issues associated with euthanasia. Passive euthanasia (known as "pulling the plug") is legal under some circumstances in many countries. Active euthanasia, however, is legal or de facto legal in only a handful of countries (for example, Belgium, Canada and Uruguay), which limit it to specific circumstances and require the approval of counsellors, doctors, or other specialists.

== Definition ==
=== Current usage ===
Dictionary definitions of euthanasia define it as the act of killing someone to prevent further suffering. There is no sense of whether the person agrees or is proactive in the situation.

=== Past discussions on key elements ===
In 1974 euthanasia was defined as the "painless inducement of a quick death". However, it is argued that this approach fails to properly define euthanasia, as it leaves open a number of possible actions that would meet the requirements of the definition but would not be seen as euthanasia. In particular, these include situations where a person kills another, painlessly, but for no reason beyond that of personal gain, or accidental deaths that are quick and painless but not intentional.

Another approach incorporated the notion of suffering into the definition. The definition offered by the Oxford English Dictionary incorporates suffering as a necessary condition with "the painless killing of a patient suffering from an incurable and painful disease or in an irreversible coma", This approach is included in Marvin Khol and Paul Kurtz's definition of it as "a mode or act of inducing or permitting death painlessly as a relief from suffering". Counterexamples can be given: such definitions may encompass killing a person suffering from an incurable disease for personal gain (such as to claim an inheritance), and commentators such as Tom Beauchamp and Arnold Davidson have argued that doing so would constitute "murder simpliciter" rather than euthanasia.

The third element incorporated into many definitions is that of intentionality: the death must be intended rather than accidental, and the intent of the action must be a "merciful death". Michael Wreen argued that "the principal thing that distinguishes euthanasia from intentional killing simpliciter is the agent's motive: it must be a good motive insofar as the good of the person killed is concerned." Similarly, Heather Draper speaks to the importance of motive, arguing that "the motive forms a crucial part of arguments for euthanasia, because it must be in the best interests of the person on the receiving end." Definitions such as those offered by the House of Lords Select committee on Medical Ethics take this path, where euthanasia is defined as "a deliberate intervention undertaken with the express intention of ending a life, to relieve intractable suffering." Beauchamp and Davidson also highlight Baruch Brody's "an act of euthanasia is one in which one person ... (A) kills another person (B) for the benefit of the second person, who actually does benefit from being killed".

Draper argued that any definition of euthanasia must incorporate four elements: an agent and a subject; an intention; causal proximity, such that the actions of the agent lead to the outcome; and an outcome. Based on this, she offered a definition incorporating those elements, stating that euthanasia "must be defined as death that results from the intention of one person to kill another person, using the most gentle and painless means possible, that is motivated solely by the best interests of the person who dies." Prior to Draper, Beauchamp and Davidson had also offered a definition that included these elements. Their definition specifically discounts fetuses to distinguish between abortions and euthanasia:

In summary, we have argued ... that the death of a human being, A, is an instance of euthanasia if and only if (1) A's death is intended by at least one other human being, B, where B is either the cause of death or a causally relevant feature of the event resulting in death (whether by action or by omission); (2) there is either sufficient current evidence for B to believe that A is acutely suffering or irreversibly comatose, or there is sufficient current evidence related to A's present condition such that one or more known causal laws supports B's belief that A will be in a condition of acute suffering or irreversible comatoseness; (3) (a) B's primary reason for intending A's death is cessation of A's (actual or predicted future) suffering or irreversible comatoseness, where B does not intend A's death for a different primary reason, though there may be other relevant reasons, and (b) there is sufficient current evidence for either A or B that causal means to A's death will not produce any more suffering than would be produced for A if B were not to intervene; (4) the causal means to the event of A's death are chosen by A or B to be as painless as possible, unless either A or B has an overriding reason for a more painful causal means, where the reason for choosing the latter causal means does not conflict with the evidence in 3b; (5) A is a nonfetal organism.

Wreen, in part responding to Beauchamp and Davidson, offered a six-part definition:

Person A committed an act of euthanasia if and only if (1) A killed B or let her die; (2) A intended to kill B; (3) the intention specified in (2) was at least partial cause of the action specified in (1); (4) the causal journey from the intention specified in (2) to the action specified in (1) is more or less in accordance with A's plan of action; (5) A's killing of B is a voluntary action; (6) the motive for the action specified in (1), the motive standing behind the intention specified in (2), is the good of the person killed.

Wreen also considered a seventh requirement: "(7) The good specified in (6) is, or at least includes, the avoidance of evil", although, as Wreen noted in the paper, he was not convinced that the restriction was required.

In discussing his definition, Wreen noted the difficulty of justifying euthanasia when faced with the notion of the subject's "right to life". In response, Wreen argued that euthanasia has to be voluntary and that "involuntary euthanasia is, as such, a great wrong". Other commentators incorporate consent more directly into their definitions. For example, in a discussion of euthanasia presented in 2003 by the European Association of Palliative Care (EPAC) Ethics Task Force, the authors offered: "Medicalized killing of a person without the person's consent, whether nonvoluntary (where the person is unable to consent) or involuntary (against the person's will), is not euthanasia: it is murder. Hence, euthanasia can be voluntary only." Although the EPAC Ethics Task Force argued that both non-voluntary and involuntary euthanasia could not be included in the definition of euthanasia, there is discussion in the literature about excluding one but not the other.

=== Historical use ===
"Euthanasia" has had different meanings depending on usage. The first apparent usage of the term "euthanasia" belongs to the historian Suetonius, who described how the Emperor Augustus, "dying quickly and without suffering in the arms of his wife, Livia, experienced the 'euthanasia' he had wished for." The word "euthanasia" was first used in a medical context by Francis Bacon in the 17th century to refer to an easy, painless, happy death, during which it was a "physician's responsibility to alleviate the 'physical sufferings' of the body." Bacon referred to an "outward euthanasia"—the term "outward" he used to distinguish from a spiritual concept—the euthanasia "which regards the preparation of the soul."

== Classification ==
Euthanasia may be classified into three types, according to whether a person gives informed consent: voluntary, non-voluntary and involuntary.

There is a debate within the medical and bioethics literature about whether or not the non-voluntary (and by extension, involuntary) killing of patients can be regarded as euthanasia, irrespective of intent or the patient's circumstances. In the definitions offered by Beauchamp and Davidson and, later, by Wreen, consent on the part of the patient was not considered one of their criteria, although it may have been required to justify euthanasia. However, others see consent as essential.

=== Voluntary euthanasia ===
Voluntary euthanasia is conducted with the consent of the patient. Active voluntary euthanasia is legal in Belgium, Luxembourg and the Netherlands. Passive voluntary euthanasia is legal throughout the US per Cruzan v. Director, Missouri Department of Health. When the patient brings about their own death with the assistance of a physician, the term assisted suicide is often used instead. Assisted suicide is legal in Switzerland and the U.S. states of California, Oregon, Washington, Montana and Vermont.

=== Non-voluntary euthanasia ===
Non-voluntary euthanasia is conducted when the consent of the patient is unavailable. Examples include child euthanasia, which is illegal worldwide but decriminalised under certain specific circumstances in the Netherlands under the Groningen Protocol. Passive forms of non-voluntary euthanasia (i.e. withholding treatment) are legal in a number of countries under specified conditions.

=== Involuntary euthanasia ===
Involuntary euthanasia is done without asking for consent or against the patient's will. It is considered murder and is illegal in all countries.

=== Passive and active euthanasia ===
Voluntary, non-voluntary and involuntary types can be further divided into passive or active variants. Passive euthanasia entails the withholding treatment necessary for the continuance of life. Active euthanasia entails the use of lethal substances or forces (such as administering a lethal injection), and is more controversial. While some authors consider these terms to be misleading and unhelpful, they are nonetheless commonly used. In some cases, such as the administration of increasingly necessary, but toxic doses of painkillers, there is a debate whether or not to regard the practice as active or passive.

== History ==
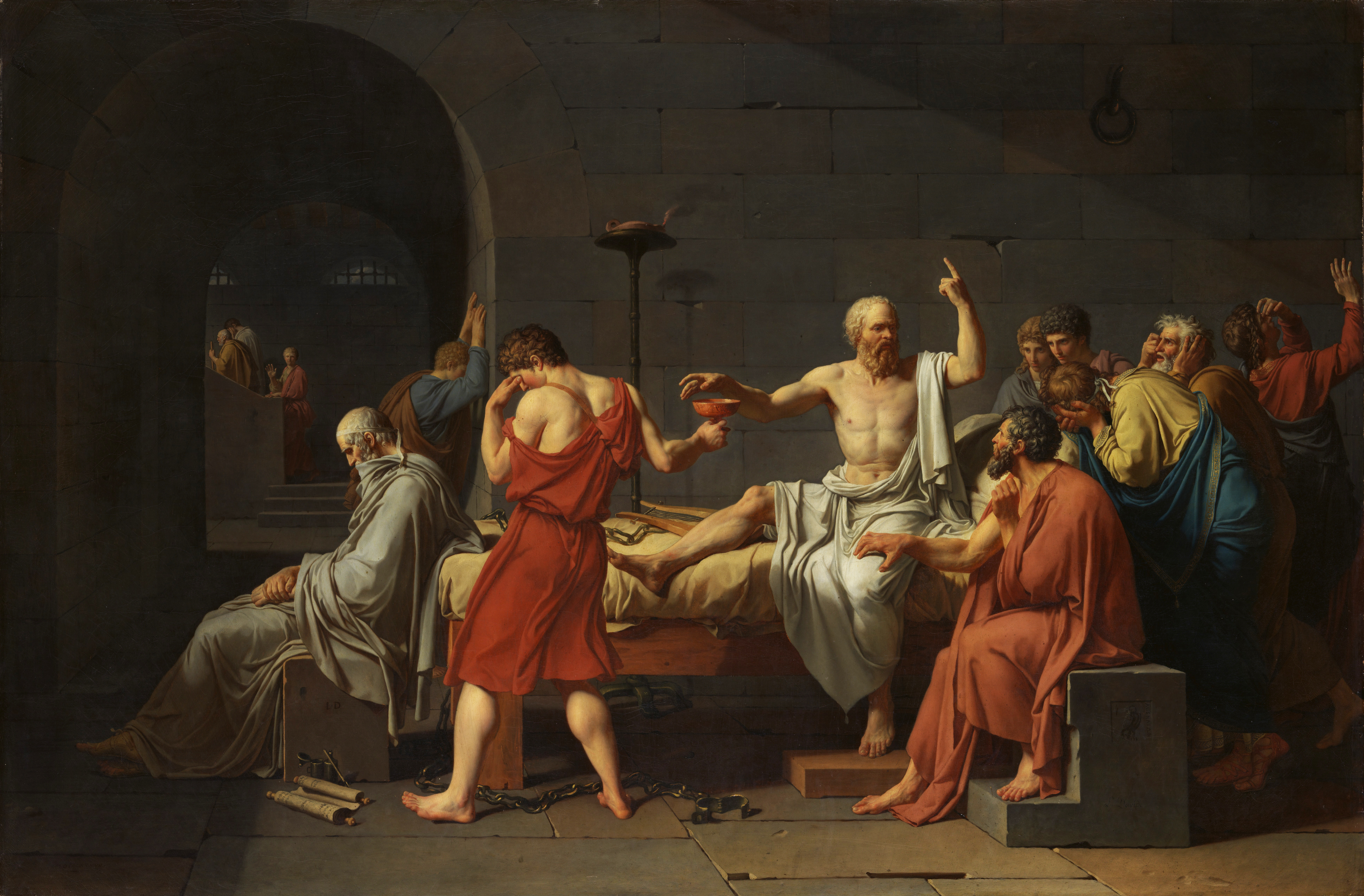
The Death of Socrates, by Jacques-Louis David (1787), depicting Socrates preparing to drink hemlock, following his conviction for corrupting the youth of Athens

Euthanasia was practiced in Ancient Greece and Rome: for example, hemlock was employed as a means of hastening death on the island of Kea, a technique also employed in Massalia. Euthanasia, in the sense of the deliberate hastening of a person's death, was supported by Socrates, Plato and Seneca the Elder in the ancient world, although Hippocrates appears to have spoken against the practice, writing "I will not prescribe a deadly drug to please someone, nor give advice that may cause his death" (noting there is some debate in the literature about whether or not this was intended to encompass euthanasia).

=== Early modern period ===
The term euthanasia, in the earlier sense of supporting someone as they died, was used for the first time by Francis Bacon. In his work, Euthanasia medica, he chose this ancient Greek word and, in doing so, distinguished between euthanasia interior, the preparation of the soul for death, and euthanasia exterior, which was intended to make the end of life easier and painless, in exceptional circumstances by shortening life. That the ancient meaning of an easy death came to the fore again in the early modern period can be seen from its definition in the 18th century Zedlers Universallexikon:

Euthanasia: a very gentle and quiet death, which happens without painful convulsions. The word comes from ευ, bene, well, and θανατος, mors, death.

The concept of euthanasia in the sense of alleviating the process of death goes back to the medical historian Karl Friedrich Heinrich Marx, who drew on Bacon's philosophical ideas. According to Marx, a doctor had a moral duty to ease the suffering of death through encouragement, support and mitigation using medication. Such an "alleviation of death" reflected the contemporary zeitgeist, but was brought into the medical canon of responsibility for the first time by Marx. Marx also stressed the distinction of the theological care of the soul of sick people from the physical care and medical treatment by doctors.

Euthanasia in its modern sense has always been strongly opposed in the Christian tradition. Thomas Aquinas opposed both and argued that the practice of euthanasia contradicted our natural human instincts of survival, as did Francois Ranchin (1565–1641), a French physician and professor of medicine, and Michael Boudewijns (1601–1681), a physician and teacher. Other voices argued for euthanasia, such as John Donne in 1624, and euthanasia continued to be practised. In 1678, the publication of Caspar Questel's De pulvinari morientibus non-subtrahend, ("On the pillow of which the dying should not be deprived"), initiated debate on the topic. Questel described various customs which were employed at the time to hasten the death of the dying, (including the sudden removal of a pillow, which was believed to accelerate death), and argued against their use, as doing so was "against the laws of God and Nature". This view was shared by others who followed, including Philipp Jakob Spener, Veit Riedlin and Johann Georg Krünitz. Despite opposition, euthanasia continued to be practised, involving techniques such as bleeding, suffocation, and removing people from their beds to be placed on the cold ground.

Suicide and euthanasia became more accepted during the Age of Enlightenment. Thomas More wrote of euthanasia in Utopia, although it is not clear if More was intending to endorse the practice. Other cultures have taken different approaches: for example, in Japan suicide has not traditionally been viewed as a sin, as it is used in cases of honor, and accordingly, the perceptions of euthanasia are different from those in other parts of the world.

=== Beginnings of the contemporary euthanasia debate ===
In the mid-1800s, the use of morphine to treat "the pains of death" emerged, with John Warren recommending its use in 1848. A similar use of chloroform was revealed by Joseph Bullar in 1866. However, in neither case was it recommended that the use should be to hasten death. In 1870 Samuel Williams, a schoolteacher, initiated the contemporary euthanasia debate through a speech given at the Birmingham Speculative Club in England, which was subsequently published in a one-off publication entitled Essays of the Birmingham Speculative Club, the collected works of a number of members of an amateur philosophical society. Williams' proposal was to use chloroform to deliberately hasten the death of terminally ill patients:

That in all cases of hopeless and painful illness, it should be the recognized duty of the medical attendant, whenever so desired by the patient, to administer chloroform or such other anaesthetic as may by-and-bye supersede chloroform – so as to destroy consciousness at once, and put the sufferer to a quick and painless death; all needful precautions being adopted to prevent any possible abuse of such duty; and means being taken to establish, beyond the possibility of doubt or question, that the remedy was applied at the express wish of the patient.

— Samuel Williams (1872), Euthanasia Williams and Northgate: London.

The essay was favourably reviewed in The Saturday Review, but an editorial against the essay appeared in The Spectator. From there it proved to be influential, and other writers came out in support of such views: Lionel Tollemache wrote in favour of euthanasia, as did Annie Besant, the essayist and reformer who later became involved with the National Secular Society, considering it a duty to society to "die voluntarily and painlessly" when one reaches the point of becoming a 'burden'. Popular Science analysed the issue in May 1873, assessing both sides of the argument. Kemp notes that at the time, medical doctors did not participate in the discussion; it was "essentially a philosophical enterprise ... tied inextricably to a number of objections to the Christian doctrine of the sanctity of human life".

=== Early euthanasia movement in the United States ===
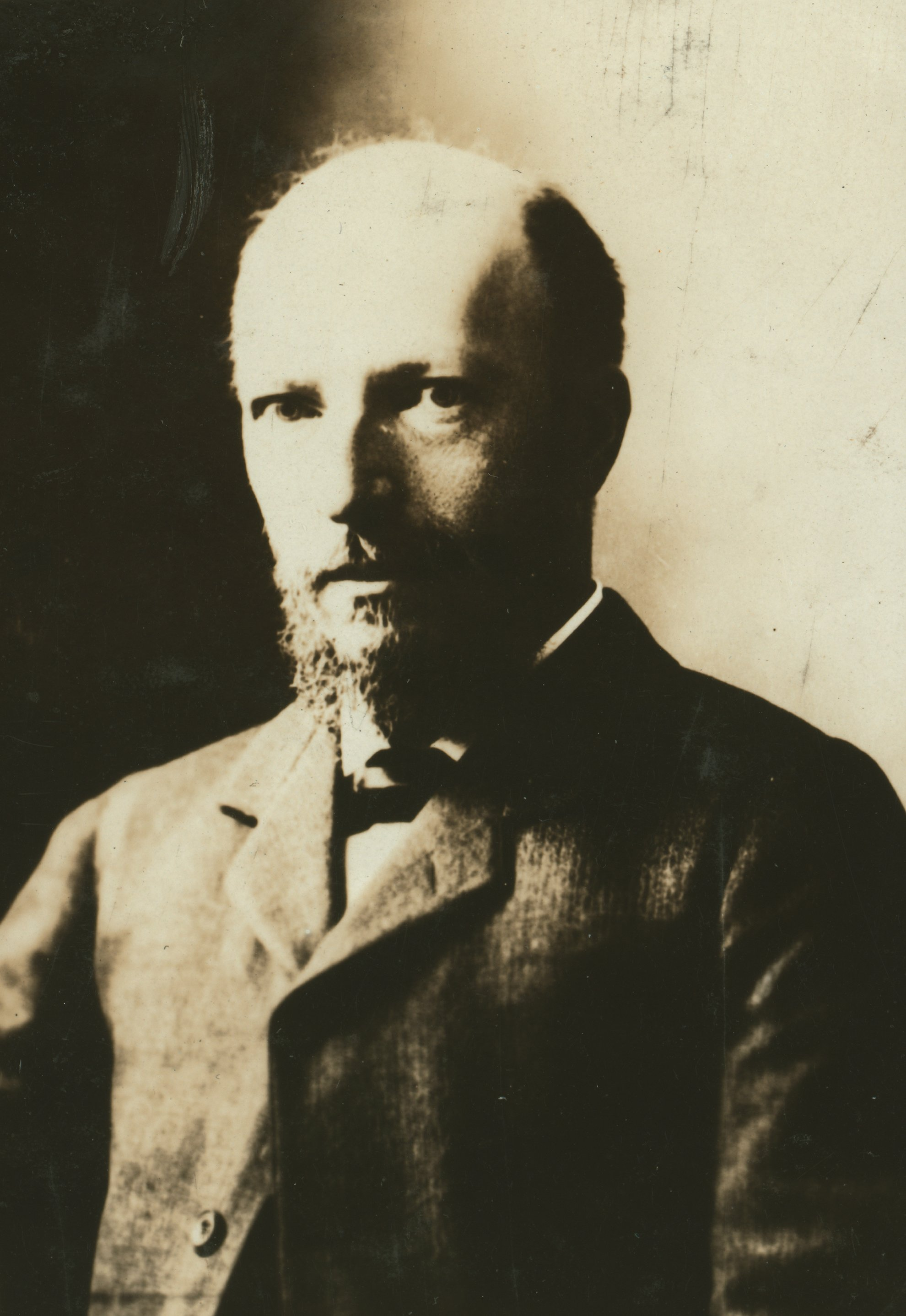
Felix Adler, c. 1913, the first prominent American to argue for permitting suicide in cases of chronic illness

The rise of the euthanasia movement in the United States coincided with the so-called Gilded Age, a time of social and technological change that encompassed an "individualistic conservatism that praised laissez-faire economics, scientific method, and rationalism", along with major depressions, industrialisation and conflict between corporations and labour unions. It was also the period in which the modern hospital system was developed, which has been seen as a factor in the emergence of the euthanasia debate.

Robert Ingersoll argued for euthanasia, stating in 1894 that where someone is suffering from a terminal illness, such as terminal cancer, they should have a right to end their pain through suicide. Felix Adler offered a similar approach, although, unlike Ingersoll, Adler did not reject religion. In fact, he argued from an Ethical Culture framework. In 1891, Adler argued that those suffering from overwhelming pain should have the right to commit suicide, and, furthermore, that it should be permissible for a doctor to assist – thus making Adler the first "prominent American" to argue for suicide in cases where people were suffering from chronic illness. Both Ingersoll and Adler argued for voluntary euthanasia of adults suffering from terminal ailments. Dowbiggin argues that by breaking down prior moral objections to euthanasia and suicide, Ingersoll and Adler enabled others to stretch the definition of euthanasia.

The first attempt to legalise euthanasia took place in the United States, when Henry Hunt introduced legislation into the General Assembly of Ohio in 1906. Hunt did so at the behest of Anna Sophina Hall, a wealthy heiress who was a major figure in the euthanasia movement during the early 20th century in the United States. Hall had watched her mother die after an extended battle with liver cancer, and had dedicated herself to ensuring that others would not have to endure the same suffering. Towards this end she engaged in an extensive letter writing campaign, recruited Lurana Sheldon and Maud Ballington Booth, and organised a debate on euthanasia at the annual meeting of the American Humane Association in 1905 – described by Jacob Appel as the first significant public debate on the topic in the 20th century.

Hunt's bill called for the administration of an anesthetic to bring about a patient's death, so long as the person is of lawful age and sound mind, and was suffering from a fatal injury, an irrevocable illness, or great physical pain. It also required that the case be heard by a physician, required informed consent in front of three witnesses, and required the attendance of three physicians who had to agree that the patient's recovery was impossible. A motion to reject the bill outright was voted down, but the bill failed to pass, 79 to 23.

Along with the Ohio euthanasia proposal, in 1906 Assemblyman Ross Gregory introduced a proposal to permit euthanasia to the Iowa legislature. However, the Iowa legislation was broader in scope than that offered in Ohio. It allowed for the death of any person of at least ten years of age who suffered from an ailment that would prove fatal and cause extreme pain, should they be of sound mind and express a desire to artificially hasten their death. In addition, it allowed for infants to be euthanised if they were sufficiently deformed, and permitted guardians to request euthanasia on behalf of their wards. The proposed legislation also imposed penalties on physicians who refused to perform euthanasia when requested: a 6–12-month prison term and a fine of between $200 and $1,000. The proposal proved to be controversial. It engendered considerable debate and failed to pass, having been withdrawn from consideration after being passed to the Committee on Public Health.

After 1906 the euthanasia debate reduced in intensity, resurfacing periodically, but not returning to the same level of debate until the 1930s in the United Kingdom.

Euthanasia opponent Ian Dowbiggin argues that the early membership of the Euthanasia Society of America (ESA) reflected how many perceived euthanasia at the time, often seeing it as a eugenics matter rather than an issue concerning individual rights. Dowbiggin argues that not every eugenist joined the ESA "solely for eugenic reasons", but he postulates that there were clear ideological connections between the eugenics and euthanasia movements.

=== 1930s in Britain ===
The Voluntary Euthanasia Legalisation Society was founded in 1935 by Charles Killick Millard (now called Dignity in Dying). The movement campaigned for the legalisation of euthanasia in Great Britain.

In January 1936, King George V was given a fatal dose of morphine and cocaine to hasten his death. At the time he was suffering from cardio-respiratory failure, and the decision to end his life was made by his physician, Lord Dawson. Although this event was kept a secret for over 50 years, the death of George V coincided with proposed legislation in the House of Lords to legalise euthanasia.

=== Nazi Euthanasia Program ===
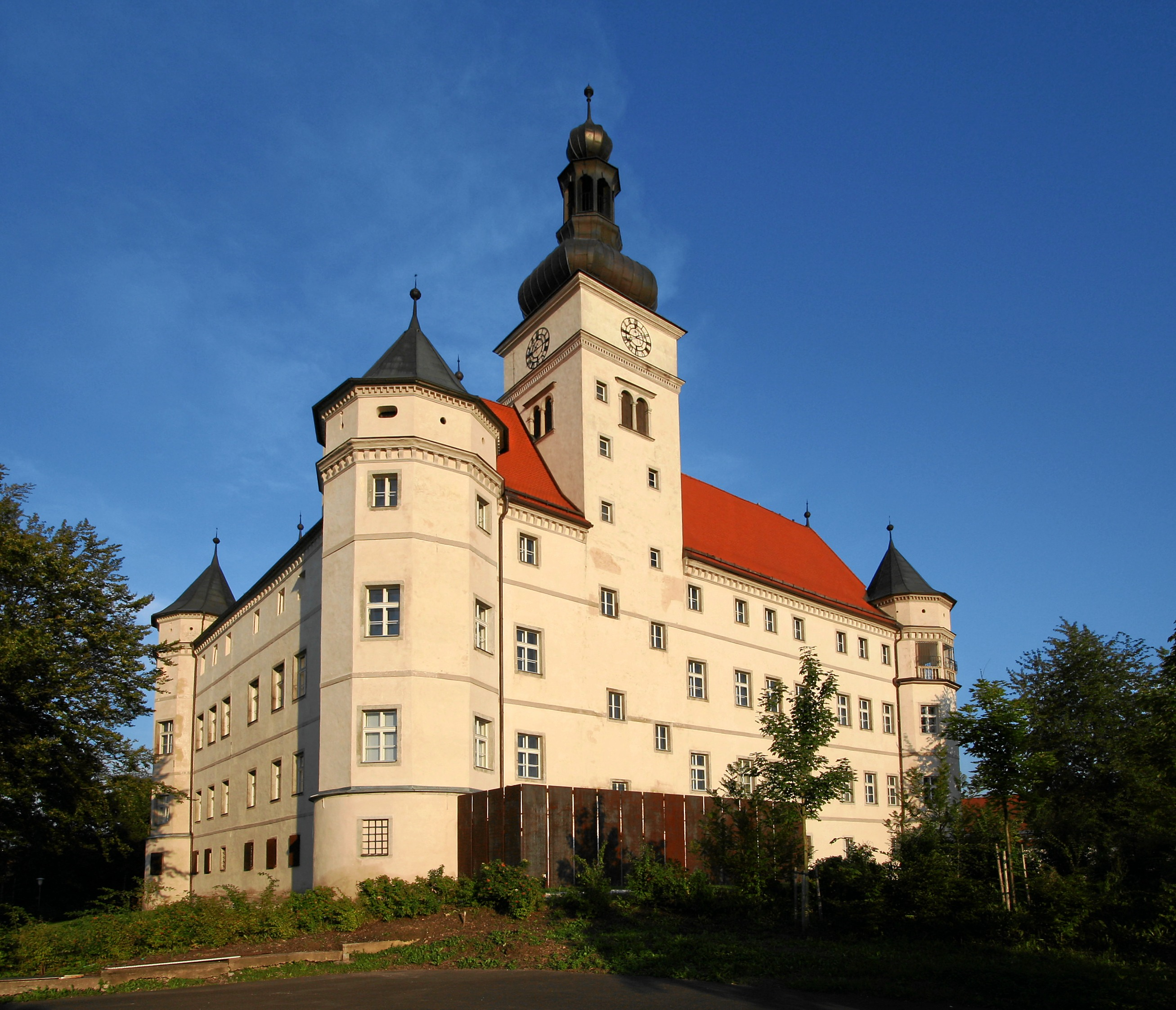
Hartheim Euthanasia Centre, where over 18,000 people were killed

A 24 July 1939 killing of a severely disabled infant in Nazi Germany was described in a BBC "Genocide Under the Nazis Timeline" as the first "state-sponsored euthanasia". Parties that consented to the killing included Hitler's office, the parents, and the Reich Committee for the Scientific Registration of Serious and Congenitally Based Illnesses. The Telegraph noted that the killing of the disabled infant—whose name was Gerhard Kretschmar, born blind, with missing limbs, subject to convulsions, and reportedly "an idiot"— provided "the rationale for a secret Nazi decree that led to 'mercy killings' of almost 300,000 mentally and physically handicapped people". While Kretchmar's killing received parental consent, most of the 5,000 to 8,000 children killed afterwards were forcibly taken from their parents.

The "euthanasia campaign" gathered momentum on 14 January 1940 when the "handicapped" were killed with gas vans and at killing centres, eventually leading to the deaths of 70,000 adult Germans. Its code name Aktion T4 is derived from Tiergartenstraße 4, a street address of the Chancellery department which recruited and paid personnel associated with the program. Professor Robert Jay Lifton, author of The Nazi Doctors and a leading authority on the T4 program, contrasts this program with what he considers to be a genuine euthanasia. He explains that the Nazi version of "euthanasia" was based on the work of Adolf Jost, who published The Right to Death (Das Recht auf den Tod) in 1895. Lifton writes:

Jost argued that control over the death of the individual must ultimately belong to the social organism, the state. This concept is in direct opposition to the Anglo-American concept of euthanasia, which emphasizes the individual's 'right to die' or 'right to death' or 'right to his or her own death,' as the ultimate human claim. In contrast, Jost was pointing to the state's right to kill. ... Ultimately the argument was biological: 'The rights to death [are] the key to the fitness of life.' The state must own death—must kill—in order to keep the social organism alive and healthy.

In modern terms, the use of "euthanasia" in the context of Aktion T4 is seen to be a euphemism to disguise a program of genocide, in which people were killed on the grounds of "disabilities, religious beliefs, and discordant individual values". Compared to the discussions of euthanasia that emerged post-war, the Nazi program may have been worded in terms that appear similar to the modern use of "euthanasia", but there was no "mercy" and the patients were not necessarily terminally ill. Despite these differences, historian and euthanasia opponent Ian Dowbiggin writes that "the origins of Nazi euthanasia, like those of the American euthanasia movement, predate the Third Reich and were intertwined with the history of eugenics and Social Darwinism, and with efforts to discredit traditional morality and ethics."

=== 1949 New York State Petition for Euthanasia and Catholic opposition ===
On 6 January 1949, the Euthanasia Society of America presented to the New York State Legislature a petition to legalize euthanasia, signed by 379 leading Protestant and Jewish ministers, the largest group of religious leaders ever to have taken this stance. A similar petition had been sent to the New York Legislature in 1947, signed by approximately 1,000 New York physicians. Roman Catholic religious leaders criticized the petition, saying that such a bill would "legalize a suicide-murder pact" and a "rationalization of the fifth commandment of God, 'Thou Shalt Not Kill.'" The Right Reverend Robert E. McCormick stated that:

The ultimate object of the Euthanasia Society is based on the Totalitarian principle that the state is supreme and that the individual does not have the right to live if his continuance in life is a burden or hindrance to the state. The Nazis followed this principle and compulsory Euthanasia was practiced as a part of their program during the recent war. We American citizens of New York State must ask ourselves this question: "Are we going to finish Hitler's job?"

The petition brought tensions between the American Euthanasia Society and the Catholic Church to a head that contributed to a climate of anti-Catholic sentiment generally, regarding issues such as birth control, eugenics, and population control. However, the petition did not result in any legal changes.

== Debate ==
Historically, the euthanasia debate has tended to focus on a number of key concerns. According to euthanasia opponent Ezekiel Emanuel, proponents of euthanasia have presented four main arguments: a) that people have a right to self-determination, and thus should be allowed to choose their own fate; b) assisting a subject to die might be a better choice than requiring that they continue to suffer; c) the distinction between passive euthanasia, which is often permitted, and active euthanasia, which is not substantive (or that the underlying principle–the doctrine of double effect–is unreasonable or unsound); and d) permitting euthanasia will not necessarily lead to unacceptable consequences. Pro-euthanasia activists often point to countries like the Netherlands and Belgium, and states like Oregon, where euthanasia has been legalized, to argue that it is mostly unproblematic.

Similarly, Emanuel argues that there are four major arguments presented by opponents of euthanasia: a) not all deaths are painful; b) alternatives, such as cessation of active treatment, combined with the use of effective pain relief, are available; c) the distinction between active and passive euthanasia is morally significant; and d) legalising euthanasia will place society on a slippery slope, which will lead to unacceptable consequences. In fact, in Oregon, in 2013, pain was not among the top five end-of-life concerns of terminally-ill people who sought euthanasia.

In the United States in 2013, 47% nationwide supported doctor-assisted suicide. This included 32% of Latinos and 29% of African-Americans. Some US disability rights organizations have also opposed bills legalizing assisted suicide.

A 2015 Populus poll in the United Kingdom found broad public support for assisted dying; 82% of people supported the introduction of assisted dying laws, including 86% of people with disabilities.

An alternative approach to the question is seen in the hospice movement which promotes palliative care for the dying and terminally ill. This has pioneered the use of pain-relieving drugs in a holistic atmosphere in which the patient's spiritual care ranks alongside physical care. It 'intends neither to hasten nor postpone death'.

== Legal status ==
Current status of euthanasia around the world: Active voluntary euthanasia legal (Australia, Belgium, Canada, Colombia, Ecuador, Jersey, Luxembourg, the Netherlands, New Zealand, Portugal, (Note: Portugal: Law not yet in force, awaits regulation to be implemented. The law legalizing euthanasia, Law n.º 22/2023, of 22 May, states in Article 31 that the regulation must be approved within 90 days of the publishing of the law, which would have been 23 August 2023. However, the regulation has not yet been approved by the government. On 24 November 2023, the Ministry of Health stated that the regulation of the law would be the responsibility of the new government elected in the 10 March 2024 elections. The law, according to its Article 34, will only enter into force 30 days after the regulation is published. As of 1 May 2026, the regulation has not yet been drafted and approved.) Spain and Uruguay) Passive euthanasia legal (refusal of treatment / withdrawal of life support) Active euthanasia illegal, passive euthanasia not legislated or regulated All forms of euthanasia illegal

Rates of euthanasia and assisted suicide (EAS) have increased substantially in developed countries, with wide variance in the rates of increase.

Eligibility for euthanasia varies across jurisdictions where it is legal. Some countries, such as Belgium and the Netherlands, allow euthanasia for mental illness.

West's Encyclopedia of American Law states that "a 'mercy killing' or euthanasia is generally considered to be a criminal homicide" and is normally used as a synonym of homicide committed at a request made by the patient.

The judicial sense of the term homicide includes any intervention undertaken with the express intention of ending a life, even to relieve intractable suffering. Not all homicide is unlawful. Two designations of homicide that carry no criminal punishment are justifiable and excusable homicide. In most countries this is not the status of euthanasia. The term euthanasia is usually confined to the active variety; the University of Washington website states that "euthanasia generally means that the physician would act directly, for instance by giving a lethal injection, to end the patient's life". Physician-assisted suicide is thus not classified as euthanasia by the US State of Oregon, where it is legal under the Oregon Death with Dignity Act, and despite its name, it is not legally classified as suicide either. Unlike physician-assisted suicide, withholding or withdrawing life-sustaining treatments with patient consent (voluntary) is almost unanimously considered, at least in the United States, to be legal. The use of pain medication to relieve suffering, even if it hastens death, has been held as legal in several court decisions.

Some governments around the world have legalized voluntary euthanasia but most commonly it is still considered to be criminal homicide. In the Netherlands and Belgium, where euthanasia has been legalized, it still remains homicide although it is not prosecuted and not punishable if the perpetrator (the doctor) meets certain legal conditions.

In a historic judgment, the Supreme Court of India legalized passive euthanasia. The apex court remarked in the judgment that the Constitution of India values liberty, dignity, autonomy, and privacy. A bench headed by Chief Justice Dipak Misra delivered a unanimous judgment. Common Cause (India) was the main petitioner in the case, filed in 2005.

== Health professionals' sentiment ==
A 2010 survey in the United States of more than 10,000 physicians found that 16.3% of physicians would consider halting life-sustaining therapy because the family demanded it, even if they believed that it was premature. Approximately 54.5% would not, and the remaining 29.2% responded "it depends". The study also found that 45.8% of physicians agreed that physician-assisted suicide should be allowed in some cases; 40.7% did not, and the remaining 13.5% felt it depended.

In the United Kingdom, the assisted dying campaign group Dignity in Dying cites research in which 54% of general practitioners support or are neutral towards a law change on assisted dying. Similarly, a 2017 Doctors.net.uk poll reported in the British Medical Journal stated that 55% of doctors believe assisted dying, in defined circumstances, should be legalised in the UK.

In 2019, the World Medical Association issued a statement during its 70th Assembly declaring itself opposed to euthanasia and assisted suicide.

== Religious views ==
=== Christianity ===
==== Broadly against ====
A number of Christian denominations take a stance against euthanasia. The Catholic Church condemns euthanasia and assisted suicide as morally wrong. As paragraph 2324 of the Catechism of the Catholic Church states, "Intentional euthanasia, whatever its forms or motives, is murder. It is gravely contrary to the dignity of the human person and to the respect due to the living God, his Creator". Because of this, per the Declaration on Euthanasia, the practice is unacceptable within the Church. The Evangelical-Lutheran Churches teach that "Anything which aims for the death of those who suffer is murder, which God strictly prohibits in His Law." The Orthodox Church in America, along with other Eastern Orthodox Churches, also opposes euthanasia stating that "euthanasia is the deliberate cessation of human life, and, as such, must be condemned as murder." Among Protestant denominations, the Episcopal Church passed a resolution in 1991 opposing euthanasia and assisted suicide stating that it is "morally wrong and unacceptable to take a human life to relieve the suffering caused by incurable illnesses." Christian denominations that oppose euthanasia include:

- Anglican Churches
  - Protestant Episcopal Church in the United States of America
- Baptist Churches
  - Southern Baptist Convention
- Catholic Church
- Eastern Orthodox Churches
  - Orthodox Church in America
- Evangelical-Lutheran Churches
  - Lutheran Church–Missouri Synod
  - Evangelical Lutheran Church in America
- Methodist Churches
  - Church of the Nazarene
  - Salvation Army
  - United Methodist Church
- Reformed Churches
  - Presbyterian Church in America
  - Reformed Church in America
- Pentecostal Churches
  - Assemblies of God
- Restorationist Churches
  - The Church of Jesus Christ of Latter-day Saints
  - Seventh-day Adventist Church
  - Jehovah's Witnesses

==== Partially in favor of ====
The Church of England accepts passive euthanasia under some circumstances, but is strongly against active euthanasia, and has led opposition against recent attempts to legalise it. The United Church of Canada accepts passive euthanasia under some circumstances, but is in general against active euthanasia, with growing acceptance now that active euthanasia has been partly legalised in Canada. The Waldensians take a liberal stance on euthanasia and allow the decision to lie with individuals.

=== Islam ===
Euthanasia is a complex issue in Islamic theology; however, in general it is considered contrary to Islamic law and holy texts. Among interpretations of the Qur'an and Hadith, the early termination of life is a crime, be it by suicide or helping one commit suicide. The various positions on the cessation of medical treatment are mixed and considered a different class of action than direct termination of life, especially if the patient is suffering. Suicide and euthanasia are both crimes in almost all Muslim majority countries.

=== Judaism ===
There is much debate on the topic of euthanasia in Judaic theology, ethics, and general opinion (especially in Israel and the United States). Passive euthanasia was declared legal by Israel's highest court under certain conditions and has reached some level of acceptance. Active euthanasia remains illegal; however, the topic is actively under debate with no clear consensus through legal, ethical, theological and spiritual perspectives.

=== Hinduism ===
Although there is no absolute consensus, Hinduism generally views euthanasia as a serious act that conflicts with core principles such as Dharma (duty), Karma (actions and their consequences), and Ahimsa (non-violence).

== See also ==
- – lists many countries with notable positions
- – lists some countries with notable positions
- List of deaths from legal euthanasia and assisted suicide
- Advance healthcare directive
- Aruna Shanbaug case
- Assisted suicide
- Child euthanasia in Nazi Germany
- Coup de grâce
- Dysthanasia
- Euthanasia and the slippery slope
- Euthanasia device
- Futile medical care
- Medical law
- Noelia Castillo euthanasia case
- Palliative sedation
- Principle of double effect
- Sarco pod
- Senicide
- Terri Schiavo case
- Organ donation after medical assistance in dying
