= Harish Rana v. Union of India =

2026 judgment of the Supreme Court of India

- Court: Supreme Court of India
- Decided: 11 March 2026
- Citation: 2026 SCC OnLine SC 358

Case history
- Prior action: Delhi High Court dismissed petition (2024)

Court membership
- Judges sitting: Justice J. B. Pardiwala; Justice K. V. Viswanathan

Keywords
- Passive euthanasia; Persistent vegetative state; Article 21; Advance medical directive

Harish Rana v. Union of India (2026 SCC OnLine SC 358) is a landmark judgment of the Supreme Court of India, delivered on 11 March 2026, in which the Court permitted the withdrawal of life-sustaining treatment for Harish Rana, a 32-year-old man who had remained in a Permanent Vegetative State (PVS) for over thirteen years following a traumatic brain injury sustained in 2013. The judgment is widely recognised as the first judicial implementation of India's passive euthanasia framework in an individual case, applying the constitutional and procedural principles established by the Supreme Court in Common Cause v. Union of India (2018).

The ruling was delivered by a bench comprising Justice J. B. Pardiwala and Justice K. V. Viswanathan. The Court permitted the withdrawal of Clinically assisted nutrition and hydration (CANH) being administered through a surgically installed PEG tube, directed the admission of Harish Rana to the palliative care department of the All India Institute of Medical Sciences (AIIMS), New Delhi, and ordered that the process be conducted in a manner that preserved the patient's dignity.

== Background ==
=== Harish Rana ===
Harish Rana was born and raised in Ghaziabad, Uttar Pradesh. At the time of his accident, he was a 19-year-old engineering student enrolled at Panjab University, Chandigarh.

=== The accident (August 2013) ===
In August 2013, Harish Rana fell from the fourth floor of his paying guest accommodation near Panjab University, Kharar, Chandigarh. The fall caused catastrophic traumatic brain injury, resulting in a Permanent Vegetative State and one-hundred percent quadriplegia — complete paralysis of all four limbs. Despite emergency hospitalisation and treatment, Rana did not regain consciousness or meaningful awareness.

=== Medical condition ===
Following discharge from hospital, Rana was sustained entirely through CANH administered via a surgically installed percutaneous endoscopic gastrostomy (PEG) tube. He also relied on a tracheostomy tube for breathing. Over the following years, medical assessments consistently documented the absence of meaningful interaction, voluntary movement, or any therapeutic improvement. Although Rana exhibited sleep–wake cycles, he remained wholly dependent on caregivers for all activities of daily life and was unable to communicate or respond to his surroundings.

The Supreme Court, in its judgment, noted that the patient exhibited "no meaningful interaction" and had been dependent on others for "all activities of self-care", and that "his condition has shown no improvement".

=== Family circumstances ===
For over a decade, Rana's parents bore the full burden of his care at their home. Monthly expenditure on medical supplies, feeding equipment, and specialist consumables ranged between ₹24,000 and ₹30,000. In order to finance his treatment, the family was compelled to sell their home. Rana's father, Ashok Rana, subsequently described the situation as one that prolonged his son's agony without any prospect of recovery:

Watching your own child fade away is the deepest pain a parent can suffer. Yet, for him, death is a release, a gentle escape from the endless misery and suffering he has endured for the last 13 years.

— Ashok Rana, father of Harish Rana

== Medical assessment ==
=== Primary Medical Board ===
In 2025, the Supreme Court of India directed the constitution of a Primary Medical Board in accordance with the procedural guidelines established in Common Cause v. Union of India (2018). The board examined Rana's neurological condition and confirmed the diagnosis of irreversible brain damage and a Permanent Vegetative State.

=== Secondary Medical Board (AIIMS) ===
The Court further directed the All India Institute of Medical Sciences, New Delhi (AIIMS) to constitute a Secondary Medical Board. Reporting in December 2025, this board concluded that the chances of neurological recovery were negligible, that no meaningful communication or voluntary movement had been recorded, and that the continued administration of CANH served only to maintain biological existence without any therapeutic benefit. The bench described the board's findings as "sad", with Justice Pardiwala observing, "We cannot keep this boy in this stage."

Both medical boards, together with the patient's next of kin, reached the unanimous conclusion that withdrawal of CANH was appropriate.

== Legal proceedings ==
=== Delhi High Court (2024) ===
Rana's father, Ashok Rana, first approached the Delhi High Court in 2024 seeking judicial permission to withdraw his son's life-sustaining treatment. The High Court dismissed the application on two grounds: first, that Rana was not dependent on mechanical ventilation; and second, that his condition did not satisfy the criterion of "terminal illness" as understood under the passive euthanasia framework. The High Court further held that removing the PEG feeding tube would constitute an act of starvation rather than a withdrawal of medical treatment, and characterised the proposed action as closer to active euthanasia, which remains illegal in India.

=== Petition before the Supreme Court ===
Following the dismissal of their petition by the Delhi High Court, the family approached the Supreme Court of India. The Supreme Court admitted the petition and, in 2025, directed the constitution of the Primary and Secondary Medical Boards. On 15 January 2026, the bench reserved its judgment after hearing final arguments. The ruling was pronounced on 11 March 2026.

== Judgment ==
=== On clinically assisted nutrition as medical treatment ===
The Supreme Court decisively overruled the Delhi High Court's reasoning. The Court held that CANH — whether administered through PEG tubes or nasogastric tubes — constitutes a form of medical treatment requiring clinical assessment and ongoing management, and is not mere basic nursing care. Because CANH is a medical intervention, it falls within the passive euthanasia framework established in Common Cause (2018) and may lawfully be withdrawn when it no longer serves a therapeutic purpose and only prolongs biological existence in a vegetative state. The Court directed that "the medical treatment, including the clinically assisted nutrition administered to the patient, shall be withdrawn or withheld."

This ruling is considered a significant legal clarification, as it resolves a critical ambiguity in the interpretation of the Common Cause guidelines and establishes that patients sustained solely through nutritional intervention — without mechanical ventilation — remain eligible for consideration under the passive euthanasia framework.

=== On human dignity and Article 21 ===
The Court emphasised that the case lay at "the intersection of love, loss, medicine and compassion." The bench reaffirmed that the right to life guaranteed under Article 21 of the Constitution of India encompasses the right to live with dignity, and that this dignity must extend to decisions made at the end of life. The Court held that artificially prolonging biological existence in the complete absence of any prospect of recovery undermines, rather than upholds, that dignity.

Delivering the ruling, Justice Pardiwala addressed Harish Rana's parents directly:

Our decision today is not only logic, it sits in a space of love, medicine, and science. This is an act of profound compassion and courage. You are not abandoning your son. You are allowing him to leave with dignity.

— Justice J. B. Pardiwala

Justice Pardiwala was reported to have been visibly moved while reading out the order.

=== On surrogate consent in the absence of a living will ===
The Court acknowledged that Harish Rana had not executed an Advance Medical Directive (living will) prior to his accident in 2013, as he lacked the opportunity to do so. Because Rana could not personally consent to withdrawal of treatment, the Court permitted surrogate decision-making by his next of kin — his parents — in conjunction with the unanimous recommendations of the two medical boards. The Court clarified that this arrangement does not constitute active euthanasia and does not expose the family or treating physicians to criminal liability under the Bharatiya Nyaya Sanhita, 2023.

=== Directions on palliative care ===
The Supreme Court directed AIIMS, New Delhi to admit Harish Rana to its palliative care department and to formulate a "robust, palliative, and end-of-life care plan." The Court ordered that the withdrawal of treatment be carried out in a structured and humane manner, with active management of pain and symptoms, and that the process must not amount to an abandonment of the patient. AIIMS was also directed to facilitate the safe transfer of Rana from his home to the palliative care facility. The Court additionally waived the mandatory thirty-day reconsideration period that had been prescribed under earlier procedural guidelines, citing the protracted nature of Rana's suffering.

== Legal significance ==
=== First implementation of the passive euthanasia framework ===
The judgment in Harish Rana v. Union of India is recognised as the first occasion on which an Indian court approved and directed the practical implementation of passive euthanasia for an individual patient. While earlier Supreme Court decisions had recognised and codified the right to die with dignity in principle, no court had previously authorised the withdrawal of life support in an actual case under the procedural framework established in Common Cause v. Union of India (2018).

=== Clarification of the Common Cause (2018) guidelines ===
A significant contribution of the judgment is its correction of the narrow interpretation adopted by the Delhi High Court. The Supreme Court clarified that the requirement for "mechanical life support" or "terminal illness" should not be construed so restrictively as to exclude patients who are sustained solely through nutritional and hydration interventions. By classifying CANH as a form of medical treatment, the Court ensured that patients in a Permanent Vegetative State who are not connected to ventilators remain eligible for consideration under the passive euthanasia framework.

=== Mandatory link between withdrawal and palliative care ===
The Court's direction that the withdrawal of life support must occur within a structured palliative care plan at AIIMS established an important procedural precedent: the withdrawal of treatment must be accompanied by active measures to ensure patient comfort and dignity, and cannot amount to mere abandonment. This direction also signals a need for India to develop a stronger institutional framework for end-of-life palliative care.

=== Call for legislation ===
The judgment renewed calls for Parliament to enact a comprehensive, dedicated law governing euthanasia and end-of-life care. As of March 2026, India continues to rely on evolving judicial guidelines rather than statutory law to govern passive euthanasia, a situation the Court implicitly recognised as inadequate.

== Legal framework: passive euthanasia in India ==
India's legal framework for passive euthanasia is grounded in Article 21 of the Constitution of India, which guarantees the right to life and personal liberty. The Supreme Court of India has, through a series of constitutional judgments, interpreted Article 21 to include the right to live with dignity, which the Court has held extends to decisions made at the end of life. Indian law draws a firm distinction between passive euthanasia — the withdrawal or withholding of futile life-sustaining medical treatment, allowing the underlying condition to follow its natural course — and active euthanasia, which involves the deliberate administration of substances to cause death and remains illegal.

The principal judicial milestones in the evolution of this framework are as follows:

Gian Kaur v. State of Punjab (1996) 2 SCC 648
A Constitution Bench of the Supreme Court held that Article 21 does not encompass a general right to die. The Court left open the possibility that the right to die with dignity might apply in exceptional medical circumstances.

Aruna Ramchandra Shanbaug v. Union of India (2011) 4 SCC 454
The Supreme Court addressed the issue of passive euthanasia for the first time, in the context of Aruna Shanbaug, a nurse at King Edward Memorial Hospital, Mumbai, who had remained in a persistent vegetative state for over three decades following a violent assault in 1973. The Court recognised passive euthanasia as permissible in principle, under strict judicial safeguards, and required approval from the relevant High Court along with the assessment of a medical board of three doctors. However, the Court declined to permit withdrawal of treatment in Shanbaug's own case; she died from pneumonia in 2015.

Common Cause v. Union of India AIR 2018 SC 1665
A five-judge Constitution Bench significantly expanded the legal framework. The Court held that the right to die with dignity is an integral component of Article 21, validated the concept of Advance Medical Directives (living wills), and established detailed procedural guidelines for the withdrawal of life-sustaining treatment — including the requirement of Primary and Secondary Medical Boards and judicial oversight. The 2026 ruling in Harish Rana constitutes the first practical individual implementation of these guidelines.

Harish Rana v. Union of India (2026) SCC OnLine SC 358
The Supreme Court for the first time authorised and directed the withdrawal of life support in an actual individual case, applying the Common Cause framework and clarifying the classification of CANH as medical treatment.

== See also ==
- Euthanasia in India
- Aruna Shanbaug case
- Right to die
- Persistent vegetative state
- Advance healthcare directive
