= Shourie =

Shourie is a surname. Notable people with the surname include:

- Arun Shourie (born 1941), Indian economist
- Devinder Shory (born 1958), Canadian politician
- H. D. Shourie (1911–2005), Indian activist
- Konrad Shourie, Canadian police officer
- Mona Shourie Kapoor (1964–2012), Indian television producer
- Nalini Singh (born Nalini Shourie in 1945), Indian journalist
- Surender Shourie (born 1980), Indian politician
