= Euthanasia in India =

The law on Euthanasia in India distinguishes between active and passive euthanasia.

Forms of active euthanasia, including the administration of lethal compounds, are still illegal in India.

Passive euthanasia (more commonly known as withholding and/or withdrawal of life support) has been legal in India in a limited set of circumstances since the Supreme Court's judgments in Aruna Shanbaug (2011), Common Cause (2018), and an order modifying the guidelines issued in Common Cause (2023).

Patients must consent through a living will, and must be either terminally ill or in a vegetative state. The procedural guidelines were streamlined and relaxed by the Supreme Court in January 2023.

== History ==
=== Aruna Shanbaug (2011) ===
In 2009, activist and journalist Pinki Virani filed a petition in Supreme Court of India on behalf of Aruna Shanbaug, a nurse working at the KEM Hospital in Mumbai on 27 November 1973 when she was sexually assaulted by a sweeper. During the attack, Shanbaug was strangled with a chain, and the deprivation of oxygen left her in a vegetative state. She was treated at KEM following the incident and was kept alive by a feeding tube for 42 years, until she died of pneumonia in 2015.

In the petition, Virani argued that the Shanbaug's continued existence was a "violation of her right to live in dignity".

On 7 March 2011, the Supreme Court rejected the plea to discontinue Shanbaug's life support. The Supreme Court's decision to reject the discontinuation of Aruna's life support was based on the fact that the hospital staff who treat and take care of her did not support euthanizing her. Shanbaug died from pneumonia on 18 May 2015, after being in a coma for a period of 42 years. Despite rejecting this particular claim, the Supreme Court legalised passive euthanasia, and noted that it included the withdrawing of treatment or food that would allow the patient to live.

=== Common Cause v Union of India (2018) ===
On 25 February 2014, while hearing a PIL filed by NGO Common Cause, a three-judge bench of the Supreme Court of India observed that the judgment is inconsistent in itself as though it observes that euthanasia can be allowed only by legislature yet it goes on to lay down guidelines on the same. Therefore, court has referred the issue to a constitution bench which shall be heard by a strength of at least five judges. Court observed:

In view of the inconsistent opinions rendered in Aruna Shanbaug (supra) and also considering the important question of law involved which needs to be reflected in the light of social, legal, medical and constitutional perspective, it becomes extremely important to have a clear enunciation of law. Thus, in our cogent opinion, the question of law involved requires careful consideration by a Constitution Bench of this Court for the benefit of humanity as a whole.

The Five-Judge Bench of the Supreme Court was tasked with deciding whether Article 21 of the Constitution includes in its ambit the right to die with dignity by means of executing a living wills/advance directives.

In 2018, the five-judge bench declared that "living wills" or advance medical directives allowing consenting patients to be passively euthanized if the patient suffers from a terminal illness or is in a vegetative state. Before passive euthanasia became practicable in India, there existed the possibility of signing a leaving against medical advice (LAMA) which transferred from the physician to the patient the full responsibility for the discontinuation of his living therapies. The court once again rejected active euthanasia by means of lethal injection. In the absence of a law regulating euthanasia in India, the court stated that its decision becomes the law of the land until the Indian parliament enacts a suitable law.

=== Modification of Common Cause Guidelines (2023) ===
In January 2023, the Supreme Court modified its guidelines in the Common Cause judgment, streamlining the process of preparing a valid advance medical directive.

=== Harish Rana (2026) ===
In March 2026, the Supreme Court accepted the plea of passive euthanasia for a 31-year old man Harish Rana after he remained in vegetative state for last thirteen years.

== Response ==
After the court ruling The Telegraph consulted with Muslim, Hindu, Jain and Christian religious leaders. Though generally against legalising euthanasia, Christians and the Jains thought passive euthanasia was acceptable under some circumstances. Jains and Hindus have the traditional rituals Santhara and Prayopavesa respectively, wherein one fasts unto death. The Jain vow of sallekhanā or santhara, is observed by the Jains only in special circumstances. These are mentioned in the Jain texts like Ratnakaranda śrāvakācāra. Some members of India's medical establishment were skeptical about euthanasia due to the country's weak rule of law and the large gap between the rich and the poor, which might lead to the exploitation of the elderly by their families.

Reporters for Reuters observed in 2018 that "The issue is not considered politically contentious in India."

== See also ==
- Thalaikoothal
- Sallekhana
