= Kanta Saroop Krishen =

Indian social worker (1929–2024)

- Born: 7 February 1929; Punjab Province, British India
- Died: 30 November 2024 (aged 95)
- Occupation: Social worker
- Known for: Voluntary blood donation initiative
- Spouse: Swarup Krishen
- Children: One son and two daughters
- Parent: R. B. Vishan Bhagwan
- Awards: Padma Shri; Red Cross Gold Medal; H. D. Shourie Award; Mother Teresa Award; Rajiv Gandhi Award

Kanta Saroop Krishen (née Bhagwan; 7 February 1929 – 30 November 2024) was an Indian social worker and one of the founders of the Blood Bank Society, Chandigarh and the Indian Society of Blood transfusion and Immunohaematology. She is known to have worked for spreading the message of voluntary blood donation in India and is a recipient of the fourth highest Indian civilian award of Padma Shri for the year 1972 from the Government of India.

== Biography ==
Kanta Bhagwan was born on 7 February 1929, in Punjab Province, British India (now in Pakistan), into a rich family to R. B. Vishan Bhagwan, one-time chairman of the Union Public Service Commission. She is reported to have been studious in her studies and passed the matriculation examination with scholarship. She got married at the age of 16 to Sarup Krishen, an Indian Administrative Service officer who would later become the first chief secretary of the state of Haryana. In Chandigarh, she met J. G. Jolly, then professor and head of the department of transfusion medicine at the Post Graduate Institute of Medical Education and Research and started associating with Jolly's efforts in combating commercial blood donations which posed the danger of unsafe blood. She assisted Jolly in the establishment of the Blood Bank Society, Chandigarh (BBS) and the Indian Society of Blood Transfusion and Immunohaematology (ISBTI) and became the founder secretary general of ISBTI, a post she held for 45 years. She served BBS as its secretary for 25 years and the Blood Centre of the organisation is housed in a building constructed with a donation of ₹ 5 million from her brother, Sudhir Bhagwan. She has also been associated with the Indian Red Cross Society, Women's Defence Council, Bharat Scouts and Guides and Child Welfare Council (CWC) and has served as the secretary of CWS.

Kanta Krishen was one of the associates of H. D. Shourie when he gathered information and filed a civil writ petition at the Supreme Court of India against the commercial practices in blood donation on which the apex court of India returned a judgment banning commercial blood donation. Later, she organised several awareness campaigns and presented papers at various conferences in India and abroad. She also participated in the activities of Sant Nirankari Mission, a spiritual organisation based in Delhi. Her efforts were also reported behind the formulation of the National Blood Donation Policy by the Government of India.

Sarup Krishen, her husband died in 2006, leaving behind their son, Sanjiv Krishen and two daughters, Niti Sarin and Anu Ganju. The Government of India awarded her the civilian honour of Padma Shri in 1972. She was also a recipient of Red Cross Gold Medal, H. D. Shourie Award, Mother Teresa Award and Rajiv Gandhi Award.

Kanta Krishen died on 30 November 2024, at the age of 95.
