= Vipul Mudgal =

Indian journalist, academician and social activist

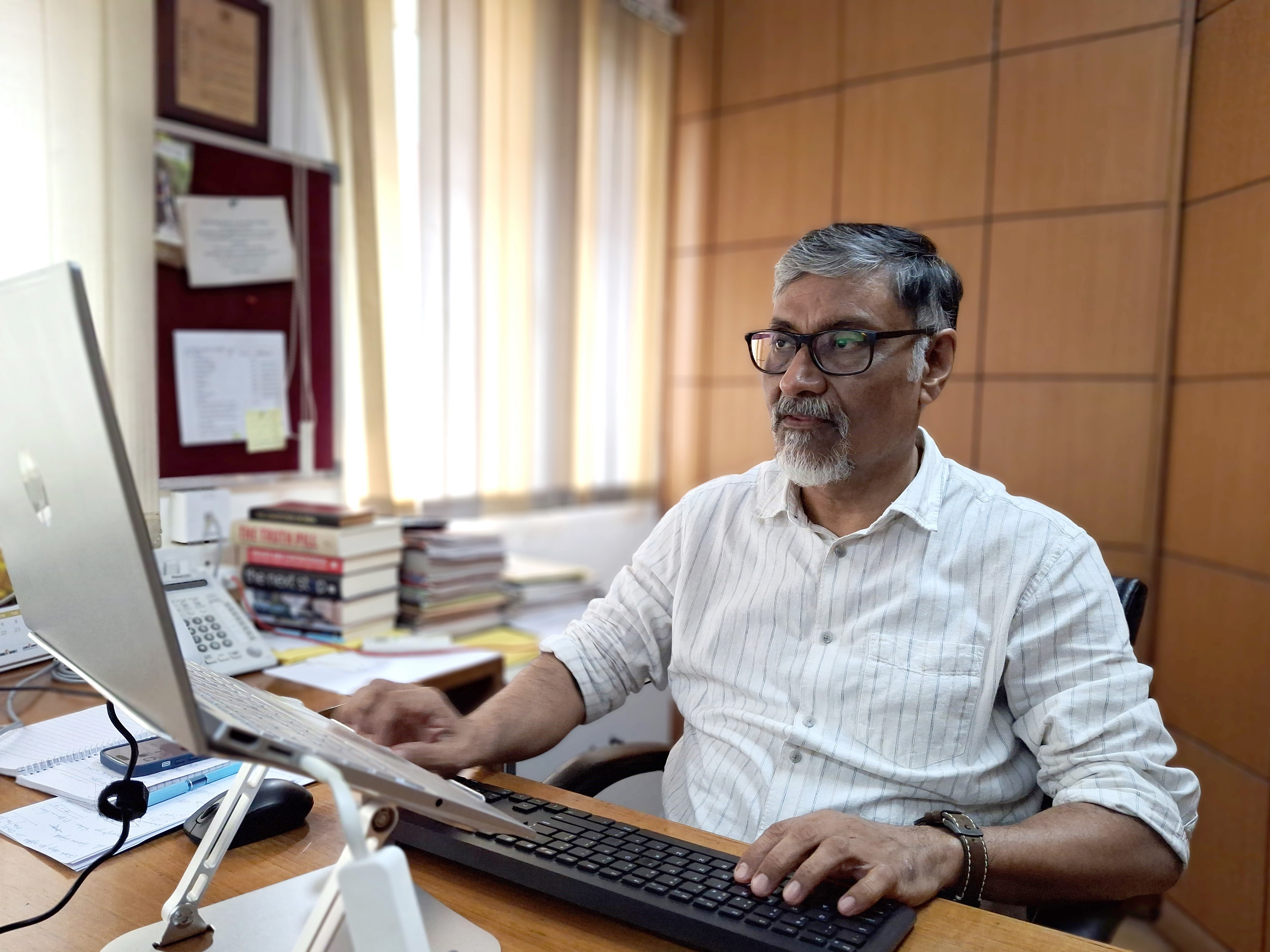
- Vipul Mudgal, in his office of The Common Cause, New Delhi (2024).
- Born: 1960 (age 65–66); Azamgarh
- Citizenship: Indian
- Education: Leicester University Indian Institute of Mass Communication St. John's College, Agra
- Organization(s): Common Cause (India), Centre for the Study of Developing Societies

Vipul Mudgal (born 1960) is a journalist, academic and social activist. He heads the rights-based NGO, Common Cause, New Delhi. He works on the intersections of democracy, governance and political violence, with emphasis on militancy, extremism, terrorism and counter-terrorism in South Asia. Mudgal has been writing on the perils of extrajudicial methods such as torture and fake police encounters. He did his PhD at Leicester University on Media, State, and Political violence as a Nehru Centenary Fellow.

Vipul has been a journalist with Hindustan Times, India Today, Asia Times and BBC. He was later a visiting senior fellow at the Centre for the Study of Developing Societies (CSDS) where he headed a project called 'Inclusive Media for Change' on rural livelihoods.

He has been awarded many global fellowships, like Reagan-Fascell Democracy Fellowship (2020) at Washington DC, Jefferson Fellowship (2003) at the East-West Centre Hawaii, Nehru Centenary British Fellowship(1991) in the UK, and the Visiting Senior Fellowship at the CSDS (2013-2014).

== Education ==
Vipul Mudgal did his graduation and post-graduation from St John's College, Agra. He has a PhD in Media, State and Political Violence, from Leicester University, UK, in addition to receiving the Nehru Centenary British Fellowship.

== Career ==
His career graph spans across – journalism, academia and social activism since the 1980s.

=== As a journalist ===
Mudgal began his career as a journalist with the Hindustan Times in Delhi in the mid of 1980s and was made the newspaper's correspondent in Amritsar, the then nerve centre of Punjab politics. In 1987, he joined India Today as a senior correspondent at Chandigarh to cover Punjab and Jammu & Kashmir. He later served as the resident editor of Hindustan Times in Jaipur and Lucknow, regional editor of Asia Times in Bangkok and a BBC journalist in London and Delhi.

He has written news reports and commentary on militancy, extremism, and terrorism, particularly on the killings of innocent people by terrorists and the use of extrajudicial methods by the police-such as torture and fictitious police encounters.

=== As an academician ===
In 2009, he joined the Centre for the Study of Developing Societies (CSDS), Delhi, where he headed the Inclusive Media for Change, a clearing house of ideas on development alternatives. He completed his Visiting Senior Fellowship in October 2014.

As the head of the Publics and Policies programme at CSDS, Mudgal worked on media, public policy, democratic rights and the multiple crisis of rural India.

=== As a social activist ===
As the director of rights-based NGO, the Common Cause, New Delhi, Mudgal leads its campaigns for probity in public life and governance reforms. He also heads the team which brings out an annual report named 'Status of Policing in India Report (SPIR)' since 2018. He is on the Steering Committee of the India Justice Report.

Under his directorship 'Common Cause' fought several public-interest court cases (PILs) such as the establishment of 'Lokpal' in India, the PIL against large-scale political advertising with the misuse of public money (2014) and the PIL for 'Living Will' or the Citizens' Right to Die with Dignity, the coal scam case and challenging the illegal appointments of the directors or CBI and ED, among many other cases. In 2024, under the leadership of Vipul, Common Cause also challenged the Electoral Bonds Scheme as a co-petitioner with the Association for Democratic Reforms (ADR). In February 2024, the Electoral Bond Scheme was declared unconstitutional by a Constitution Bench of the Supreme Court of India.

== Commentaries and podcasts ==
Mudgal’s writings on Punjab and Kashmir and also on police reforms have been quoted in international human rights reports like the Human Rights Watch, the South Asia Terrorism Portal, and various other publications in India and abroad.

He has been writing for publications like Economic & Political Weekly, Journal of Democracy, SAGE Journals, Business Standard, and The Wire, among many others.

=== Podcasts ===
- The Hindu have done podcast with him on the issues like Policing, Corruption and Surveillance.
- Carnegie Endowment, Washington DC, have also done a series of podcast 'Grand Tamasha' on India's Policing Challenges with him.
- On 20 February 2024, The Wire has done a Podcast with Vipul on the issue of Electoral Bonds.

== Publications ==
His major works are on the periphery of democratic process, citizen rights, communication and state violence. His book 'Claiming India from Below: Citizen Activism and democratic Transformation' deals with the multifaceted dynamics of Indian democracy, moving beyond electoral politics and formal government structures. It emphasizes citizen participation, extra-parliamentary power monitoring, and communication as essential components of democratic transformation. By examining case studies from various Indian states, the book sheds light on the broader context beyond institutions, advocating for a more inclusive and participatory democracy.

Additionally, it introduces the concept of “citizenship communication”. A review in the Economic and Political Weekly has commented that "Mudgal proposes “citizenship communication” as a new paradigm in the place of development communication that aided imperialist agendas. He emphasises that communication be recognised as a right, embodied in the form of the right to information (RTI), public hearings, and social audits, to ensure transparency and Accountability of Governance."

=== Editor ===
- Claiming India from Below: Citizen Activism and democratic Transformation, 2016; Routledge (London), ISBN 9780815395843
- Journalism, Democracy and Civil Society in India as part of Journalism Theory and Practice Series, 2017; Routledge (London) (Jointly with Prof Shakuntala Rao of State Univ. of NY), ISBN 9780367075781

=== Book chapters ===
- "New For Sale: Media Ethics and India’s Democratic Public Sphere” in Rao and Wasserman; Media Justice in the Age of Globalization, 2015; Palgrave Macmillan(London), ISBN 978-1-137-49826-7
- "Media, Markets & Democracy: A Media Person’s Point of View,” in B Dasgupta; Market, Media and Democracy, 2011; Progressive Publishers and IDS, Kolkata, ISBN 9788180642029
- "Status of Policing in India reports: 2018 and 2019" in Sudhir Krishnaswamy, Renuka Sane, Ajay Shah and Varsha Aithala; Crime Victimisation in India, 2022; Springer Series on Asian Criminology and Criminal Justice Research, Springer, ISBN 9783031122507
- “Networked Newsroom: An Insider’s View of Market, Media, and Democracy" in “Media, Democracy and Development” by Chatterjee M and Pandey US, (University Book House, 2018), ISBN 9788181984937

== See also ==
- Association for Democratic Reforms
- Centre for the Study of Developing Societies (CSDS)
