= Common Cause (India) =

People rights advocacy group

The Common Cause (India)
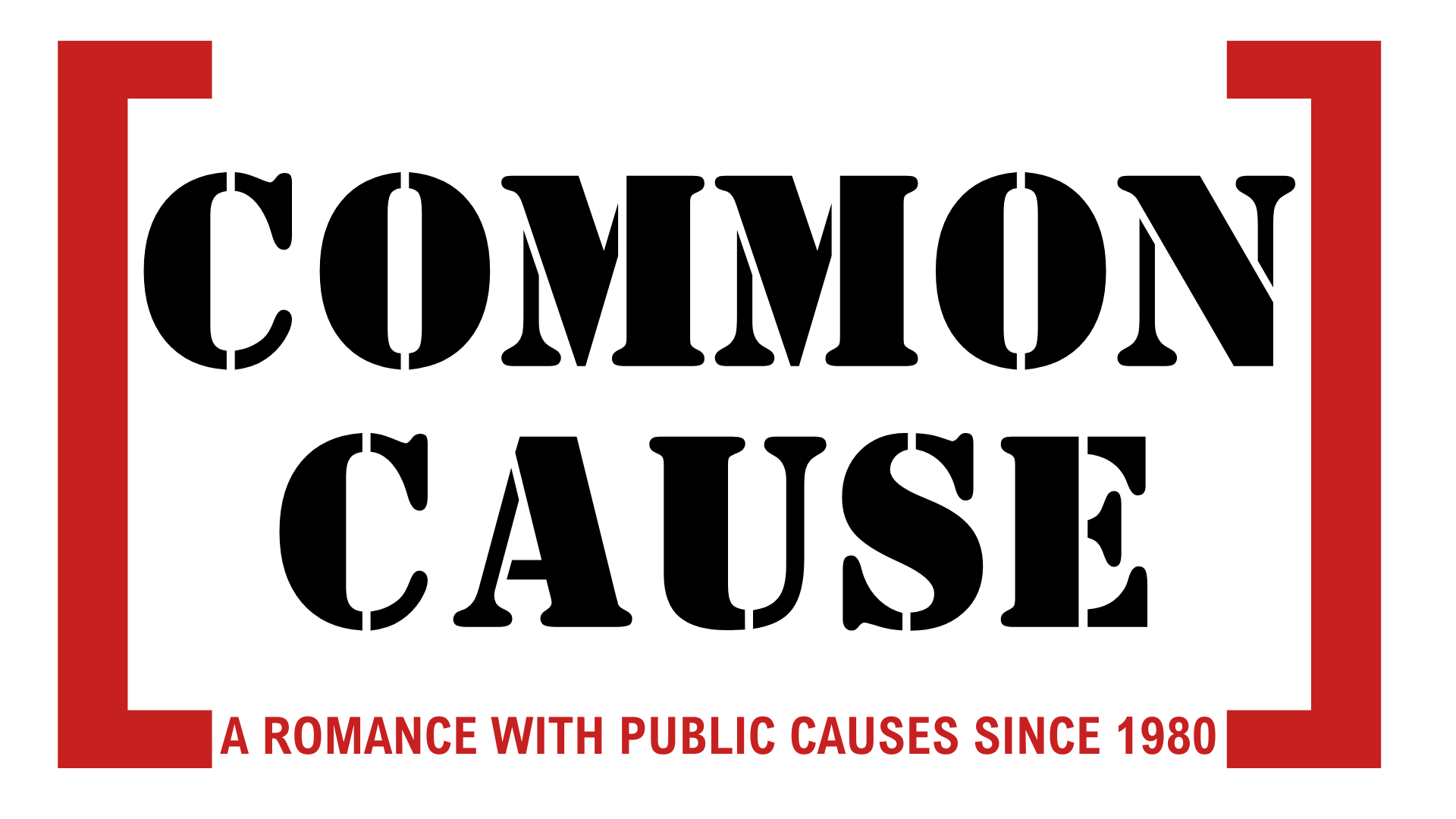
- Formation: 1980
- Founder: H. D. Shourie
- Headquarters: Delhi
- Key people: Governing Council Member: Nitin Desai, Ashok Khosla, Prakash Singh, Vikram Lal, Paranjoy Guha Thakurta
- Publication: Status of Policing in India Report
- Website: https://www.commoncause.in/

Common Cause is a non-governmental organisation based in New Delhi, India, that works on probity in public life and governance reforms. Common Cause focuses on defending and fighting for the citizens’ rights. It takes up public causes through advocacy, research and public interest litigation.

It was founded in 1980 by H D Shourie. It has been headed by Vipul Mudgal since 2015.

== History ==
Common Cause founded in 1980 by H D Shourie, started functioning with the first writ petition in the Supreme Court on behalf of 1500 retired civil servants regarding the issues and hardships faced by them. The Supreme Court heard this writ petition, which successfully contested the upward modification of pensions for only those government employees who retired after 1 April 1979. Their suit was granted by the Supreme Court, which also ordered the government to pay the actual pension to all retired employees.

The next major success came in 1996 when the detailed inquiry ordered in 1996 by the Supreme Court into the "misuse" of the official position by then petroleum minister Satish Sharma in allotments of petrol pumps and dealership of LPG happened after the Common Cause intervention.

== Work and impact ==
Common Cause has been involved in legal efforts from its formation to strengthen the accountability and functioning of key governance institutions in India. Through PIL and petition, Common Cause went through many legal struggles in the High Court and the Supreme Court, respectively. It works on marginal issues through research and academic approaches.

=== Living Will: Common Cause v Union of India ===
In 2005, to legalise the practice of executing "living wills," which functions as advance directives for refusing life-prolonging medical procedures in the event of the testator's incapacitation, Common Cause filed a petition on living wills with the Supreme Court. This petition aimed to enact legislation along the lines of the Patient Autonomy and Self-determination Act of the US.

In February 2014 the Supreme Court of India's three-judge bench stated while hearing of a Public Interest Litigation (PIL) filed by Common Cause, that the previous ruling in the Aruna Shanbaug case was incorrectly interpreted from the Constitution Bench's ruling in Gian Kaur v. State of Punjab. The court also found that the ruling was internally inconsistent as, despite holding that euthanasia can only be authorised by a legislative act, it went on to judicially create parameters for the practice. In light of the observed inconsistencies on the matter the court referred it to a Constitution Bench for a clear enunciation of the law.

Subsequently, the major threshold in this case was achieved on 9 March 2018, when a five-judge panel concluded that "living wills" or advance medical directives, permit consenting patients to be passively euthanised if they have a terminal illness or are in a vegetative state.

=== Establishment of Lokpal ===
In 1995, Common Cause filed a petition in the Supreme Court of India, seeking directions for the establishment of the office of the Lokpal at the central level and Lokayuktas in each state. Following continued advocacy and legal proceedings, the Lokpal and Lokayuktas Act was enacted in 2013. As a result, the Supreme Court dismissed the petition in 2015, citing the passage of the legislation.

In 2014, Common Cause challenged the Lokpal Selection Committee's Rules, raising concerns over the independence of the anti-corruption body. The Search Committee's Rules set out that the chairman and Members of the Lokpal will be appointed from the list of persons provided by the Central Government, countering the very objective of having an independent anti-corruption body whose job is to hold the government accountable. Subsequently, the Rules were amended and the Central Government was excluded from appointing the chairman and Members of the Lokpal. Common Cause still pursued the matter since the Lokpal was yet to be established in 2017, despite the passing of the Bill in 2013. A contempt petition was filed in 2018, and the court admonished the centre for its delay in setting up the Lokpal. Common Cause's intervention succeeded in March 2019, when the Lokpal was finally formed, with Justice Pinaki Chandra Ghose as India's first Lokpal, along with eight other members of the Lokpal panel.

=== Appointments of the CBI Director ===
In 2016, Common Cause filed a writ petition in the Supreme Court seeking the lawful appointment of a regular Central Bureau of Investigation (CBI) Director, thereby quashing the appointment of the Interim/Acting Director. The petition contended that the government has failed to appoint a Director of CBI, under Section 4A of the Delhi Special Police Establishment Act, 1946 despite knowing in advance exactly when the incumbent was going to demit office. Such ad hoc appointment of an Interim Director also violates the apex court's Vineet Narain judgement (1998), which ensures the autonomy of the CBI9. In 2017, Mr. Alok Kumar Verma was appointed as the new CBI Director, and the Interim Director's appointment was quashed.

Once again in 2018, Common Cause challenged the arbitrary removal of CBI Director Mr. Alok Kumar Verma and sought the Supreme Court directive to remove the orders appointing Mr. M. Nageshwara Rao as Interim Director and Mr. Rakesh Asthana as Special Director. For Common Cause, it was not about opposing any individual but a matter of establishing institutional integrity of the anti-corruption mechanism. Subsequently, the apex court ruled that Mr. Nageshwara Rao should not take any major policy decisions. In 2019, the court reinstated Alok Verma as the Director of CBI, quashing the appointment of the interim Director. As for the appointment of the Special Director, the court ruled that it cannot intervene in the Selection Committee's decision and found the appointment lawful.

=== Appointment of Central Vigilance Commissioner ===
Common Cause was a co-petitioner in the case against the appointment of Mr. P.J. Thomas, as the Central Vigilance Commissioner. The petition sought the Supreme Court's direction to declare Mr. Thomas’ appointment as arbitrary, illegal and void, since he was an accused in an ongoing corruption case. The then Chief Justice of India (CJI), Justice Sarosh Kapadia, along with Justices K.S Radhakrishnan and Swatenter Kumar, censured the high-powered selection committee (HPC) for not considering Mr. Thomas’ involvement in the corruption case related to the import of palm oil in Kerala. Considering the ongoing corruption case against Mr. Thomas, the court struck down his appointment as CVC, deeming it “non-est in law”.

=== Electoral Bonds 2024 : PIL in Supreme Court ===
Common Cause is one of the petitioners who submitted a petition to the Supreme Court on 24 April in order to establish a Special Investigation Team (SIT) to investigate each instance of quid pro quo, corruption, and kickbacks that was disclosed through the disclosure of electoral bond details. Common Cause and the Centre for Public Interest Litigation, represented by advocates Prashant Bhushan and Cheryl D'Souza, asserted that "certain investigative agencies, including the CBI, Enforcement Directorate, and Income Tax Department, appear to have become complicit in corruption."

Based on reports and extensive data mining conducted by The Hindu and other media outlets, the petition asserted that the information disseminated indicated that the majority of the bonds were provided to political parties as quid pro quo arrangements by corporate entities.

=== Important cases ===
Common Cause India has filed many Public Interest Litigations (PILs) at the High Courts and Supreme Court of India including those challenging the allocations of 2G Spectrum, the Coal Scam Case, Living Will case for patients’ right to die with dignity, and the illegality of the Electoral Bonds Scheme for the funding of political parties. Common Cause India was a co-petitioner along with Prakash Singh of the Indian Police Service (IPS) in the Prakash Singh Vs Union of India (2006) case in the Supreme Court of India.

== Governing Council members ==
Its Governing Council members include economist Nitin Desai, former Under-Secretary-General for Economic and Social Affairs of the United Nations from 1992 to 2003;, Dr Ashok Khosla, environmental scientist and Chairman of Development Alternatives; Vikram Lal, the founder and former CEO of Eicher Motors, India; Kamal Kant Jaswal, former Secretary to the Government of India and former Indian Administrative Service Officer Prakash Singh (retd. IPS), former DGP of Uttar Pradesh, Assam and BSF; Right to Information activist Anjali Bhardwaj; author, publisher and educator Paranjoy Guha Thakurta; democracy activist Nikhil Dey, the co-founder of the Mazdoor Kisan Shakti Sangathan. and the School for Democracy; Dr. Govind Bhattacharjee, former Director General at the Office of the Comptroller & Auditor General; Dr. B.P Mathur, former Deputy C&AG of India; Mr. Lalit Nirula, former President of the National Restaurant Association of India and philanthropist; and Mr. Sanjay Bhasin, COO of YouSolar Inc.

Shri Govind Naraian ICS (Retd.), former Governor of Karnataka and Padma Vibhushan awardee is a former President of Common Cause India.

== Initiatives and reports ==
Common Cause brings out the Annual Status of Policing in India Reports (SPIR) on police reforms in collaboration with the Centre for the Study of Developing Societies (CSDS). The SPIR evaluates the performance of the police and the levels of the citizens’ trust and satisfaction in policing.

Common Cause is also a partner in the India Justice Report (IJR) which ranks the capacity of the justice system. The India Justice Report is a national periodic reporting initiative that is first of its kind. It unifies previously siloed information to assess each state's four pillars of the justice system—the police, the jail system, the judiciary, and legal aid—by comparing them to their own set of stated benchmarks or standards.

== See also ==
- Aruna Shanbaug case
- Citizens Justice Committee
- Centre for Action Research and People's Development
