= Anil Swarup =

Indian author and retired civil servant

School Education & Literacy Secretary of India
- In office 24 November 2016 – 30 June 2018
- Preceded by: Subash Chandra Khuntia
- Succeeded by: Rina Ray

Coal Secretary of India
- In office 31 October 2014 – 23 November 2016
- Preceded by: S K Srivastava
- Succeeded by: Susheel Kumar

Personal details
- Born: 1 July 1958 (age 68) Allahabad, Uttar Pradesh, India
- Occupation: Retired IAS officer; Author

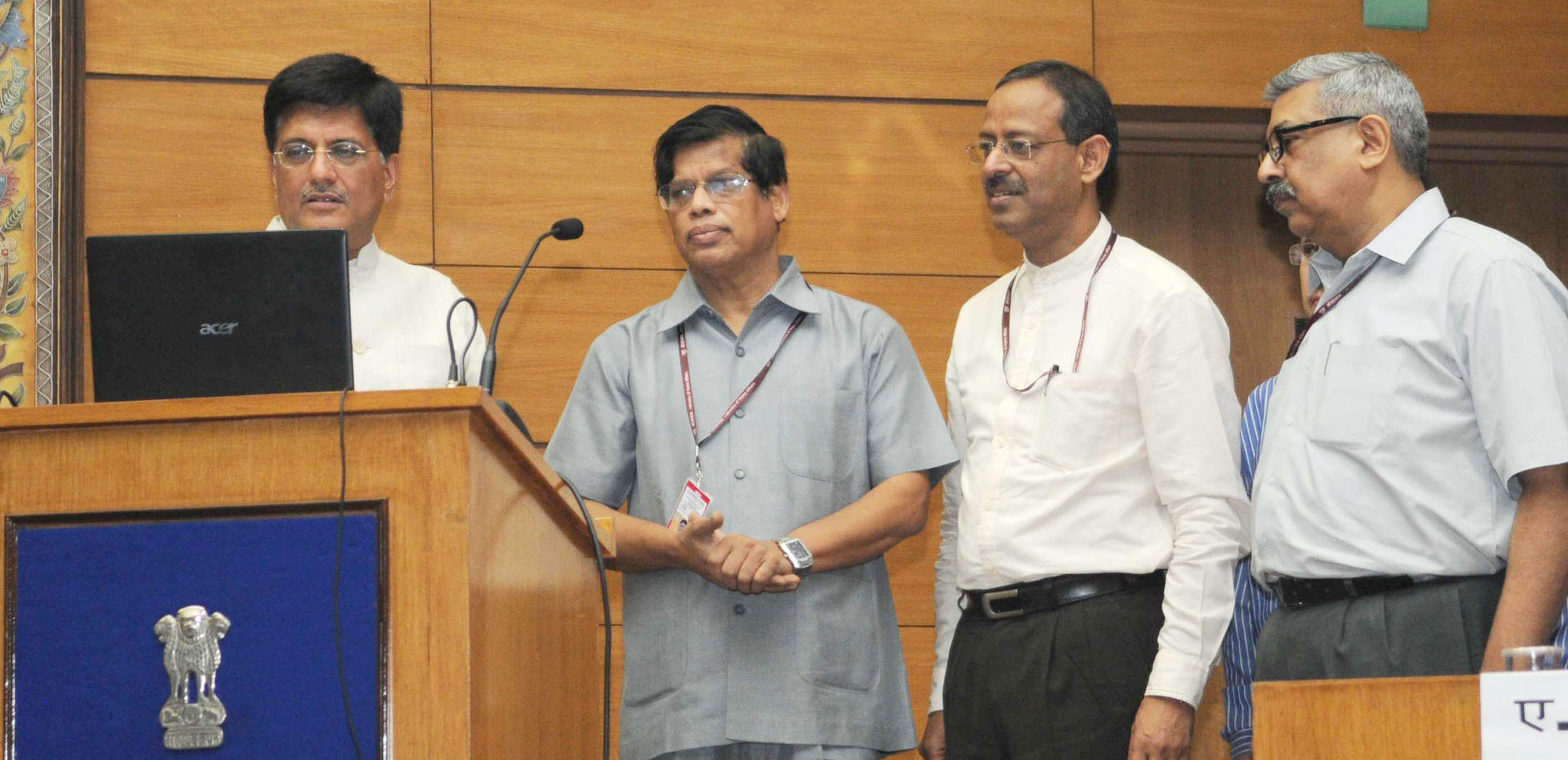
Piyush Goyal launching the ‘Ujwal Bharat’, at a press conference on the achievements of his Ministries, in New Delhi. Swarup is second from right.

Anil Swarup (born 1 July 1958) is an Indian author and retired Indian Administrative Service officer of Uttar Pradesh cadre and 1981 batch. Mr. Swarup in his 38 years of career has served in various capacities and later went on to become the Secretary to the Government of India.

== Early life and education ==
Anil Swarup was born in Allahabad (now called Prayagraj) in the state of Uttar Pradesh, India. He is a post-graduate in Political Science from the University of Allahabad in 1978, where he was awarded Chancellor's gold medal for being the "best all-round student".

== Career ==
Before joining IAS, he worked as an Indian Police Service officer for one year. Swarup joined IAS in 1981 and is the recipient of Director's gold medal for "best officer trainee" of his batch at the Lal Bahadur Shastri National Academy of Administration (LBSNAA).

He has served in various key positions for both the Union Government and the Government of Uttar Pradesh, like as Education Secretary of India, Coal Secretary of India, Additional Secretary in the Cabinet Secretariat of India, Additional Secretary of Labour & Empowerment, Export Commissioner in the Ministry of Commerce & Industry of India and as the District Magistrate of Lakhimpur Kheri during the Babri Masjid-Ram Janmabhoomi agitation under then chief ministership of Kalyan Singh.

=== As Coal Secretary ===
Anil Swarup became Secretary in the coal ministry after the coal scam in which the Supreme Court of India cancelled more than 200 blocks allocated since 1993. Swarup conducted coal auctions in a transparent manner, which was a huge success. In 2015, he was transferred to the Education Ministry as a part of a major bureaucratic reshuffle that took place in 2016.

== Books and publications ==
Swarup has authored following books

- Not just a Civil Servant. Unicorn Books. February 2019. ISBN 978-8178064802.
- Ethical Dilemmas of a Civil Servant. Unique Publishers. July 2020. ISBN 978-9389728446.
- Encounters With Politicians. Unique Publishers. January 2024. ISBN 978-8119361489.

== See also ==
- Ashok Khemka, whistle blower IAS
- Sanjiv Chaturvedi, whistle blower IAS
