= Pinki Virani =

Indian journalist, activist and writer

- Born: 30 January 1959 (age 67); Bombay, India
- Occupations: Journalist and writer
- Spouse: Shankkar Aiyar

Pinki Virani (born 30 January 1959) is an Indian writer, journalist, human-rights activist and writer. She is the author of Once was Bombay, Aruna's Story, Bitter Chocolate: Child Sexual Abuse in India (which won the National Award), and Deaf Heaven. Her fifth book is called Politics of the Womb – The Perils of Ivf, Surrogacy & Modified Babies.

== Early life and education ==
Virani was born in Mumbai, India, 30 January 1959, to Gujarati Muslim parents. Her father owned a shop, and her mother was a teacher. She attended school in Mumbai, Pune and Mussoorie. She secured the Aga Khan Foundation scholarship to study Journalism at Columbia University. She did an internship at The Sunday Times, where she reported extensively on the race riots in Britain.

== Career ==
Virani started working as a typist at the age of 18. After returning to India, she worked as a reporter and went on to become India's first woman editor of an evening paper.

Virani is the author of one fiction and four nonfiction books. Her first book Aruna's Story (1998) is based on Aruna Shanbaug, a 25 year old nurse at King Edward Memorial Hospital, who was sexually assaulted, sodomized, and strangled in November 1973. The attack left Shanbaug in a persistent vegetative state for 42 years until her death in 2015. The book forms part of a 52-minute documentary, produced by the PSBT, titled Passive Euthanasia: Kahaani Karuna Ki. Theatre director Arvind Gaur scripted and directed it as solo play Aruna's Story performed by Lushin Dubey. In 2002, Vinay Apte directed Katha Arunachi, a Marathi-play based on Virani's book that starred Chinmayee Sumeet as Shanbaug, and Abhay Rane as Valmiki.

Her second book Once Was Bombay (1999) consists of three novellas and four short stories that lament the "loss of the city Bombay that once existed and how it has been usurped by its politicians, its underworld, the dons, the mafia, gang wars, and communal divides." Then prime minister Atal Bihari Vajpayee cited the book in a speech on collapsing cities. Rajdeep Sardesai, in his review of Once Was Bombay said: "Pinki Virani is not entirely wrong. The great Bombay dream is over unless the dream happens to be that manufactured by a Ramgopal Varma. If Bombay makes the headlines today, it's because someone has been shot on a busy thoroughfare, or because its presiding deity has been disenfranchised by the Election Commission."

Virani's third book, Bitter Chocolate (2000), explores the intricate and disturbing parameters of family honour and morality in context of the silence in Indian homes around child sexual abuse (CSA). She narrates various instances of CSA across the country, in addition to her own experience of being sexually abused by her father's brother until she was eight years old. The book is divided into three parts (or notebooks) that approach CSA from different angles, highlighting that most perpetrators of CSA are not outsiders but known individuals within the family. A solo play based on the book was scripted-directed by Arvind Gaur and performed by Lushin Dubey. As of 2008, Bitter Chocolate in English had sold more than 30,000 copies, and undergone 11 reprints. It has also been translated into Marathi and Hindi.

Her fourth book Deaf Heaven (2009) is her only attempt at fiction, and was India's first "cell novel" which was sent to readers through ninety messages over the course of three months. The book follows Saraswati, a librarian and collector of curious facts, who passes away surrounded by her books. Until her body is discovered, her spirit roams free and watches over a medley of characters. Through Saraswati, Virani explores the "conflict between religious terrorism and secular morality." Deaf Heaven was nominated for Dublin Literary Award by Connemara (State Central) Public Library, Chennai. Published by Harper Collins, the book was released days before India witnessed a total solar eclipse. "It is such a coincidence that the characters in my book make their life changing decisions on the day of a total solar eclipse on a Monday. And India will see a total solar eclipse July 22," Virani told Hindustan Times.

In Politics Of The Womb – The Perils Of Ivf, Surrogacy & Modified Babies (2016), Virani criticises IVF and other forms of assisted reproduction when used on women in aggressively repetitive cycles and calls for a worldwide ban on commercial surrogacy and other forms of third-party assisted reproduction.

== Aruna Shanbaug case ==
In 2009, Pinki Virani filed a petition in Supreme Court of India on behalf of Aruna Shanbaug, a nurse working at the KEM Hospital in Mumbai on 27 November 1973 when she was sexually assaulted by a sweeper. During the attack, Shanbaug was strangled with a chain, and the deprivation of oxygen left her in a vegetative state. She was treated at KEM following the incident and was kept alive by a feeding tube for 42 years, until her death of pneumonia in 2015. In Virani's 2009 petition, she argued that the "continued existence of Aruna is in violation of her right to live in dignity". The Supreme Court made its decision on 7 March 2011. It rejected the plea to discontinue Aruna's life support but issued a set of broad guidelines legalising passive euthanasia in India. The Supreme Court also refused to recognise Virani as the "next friend" of Shanbaug, a description Virani had used to file the petition.

== Personal life ==
She is married to Shankkar Aiyar, who is a journalist and the author of Accidental India.

== Bibliography ==
- Aruna's Story: the true account of a rape and its aftermath. Viking, 1998.
- Bitter Chocolate: child sexual abuse in India, Penguin Books, 2000
- Once was Bombay. Viking. 1999. ISBN 0-670-88869-9.
- Deaf Heaven, HarperCollins Publishers India, 2009. ISBN 81-7223-849-5.
- Politics Of The Womb—The Perils Of IVF, Surrogacy & Modified Babies, Penguin Random House, 2016. ISBN 978-0670088720
