= Status of Policing in India Report =

The Status of Policing in India Report (SPIR) is a series of comprehensive studies that assess the performance and perceptions of policing across Indian states. It has been published periodically since 2018. Each edition provides a detailed analysis of various aspects of policing in India, including performance, public perception, and operational challenges. These reports evaluate the conditions under which police operate and gather perceptions from both citizens and police personnel.

The SPIR is a collaborative effort primarily conducted by Common Cause (India) and Lokniti-Centre for the Study of Developing Societies (CSDS) with contributions from other organizations like the Lal Family Foundation and Sir Ratan Tata Trust. Currently, Common Cause (India) is looking after the responsibility of publishing this report.

== Methodology ==
The State of Policing in India report follows a comprehensive methodology, which includes:

- Survey and data collection: Conducting face-to-face surveys across states involving trained surveyors and field investigators. Data is collected from both rural and urban setups. The surveys are conducted with general public and police personnel as well as other key stakeholders.
- Objective data analysis: Official data from sources such as the National Crime Records Bureau (NCRB), Bureau of Police Research and Development (BPRD), and Comptroller and Auditor General of India (CAG) are used.
- Indices and rankings: Indices are developed to measure state-wise performance on various parameters such as crime rate, police diversity, and infrastructure.
- Expert Consultation: Brainstorming sessions are held with experts, academicians, and retired police officers to refine the questionnaire and methodology.
- In-depth Interviews: Long and in-depth interviews are held with key stakeholders depends on the theme and objective of the report.

=== Parameters ===
The reports investigate and analyse 'the status of policing' in India at the following parameters; the citizens’ trust and satisfaction levels, discrimination against the vulnerable, police excesses, infrastructure, diversity in forces, state of prisons, working conditions, human resources and disposal of cases etc.

== SPIR 2018: A Study of Performance and Perceptions ==
The Status of Policing in India Report (SPIR) 2018 is one of the first studies investigating police performance and its interaction with the public. It is a comprehensive and ground study of the performance and perception of the police in India. It includes 15563 respondents in 22 states on parameters like citizens’ trust and satisfaction levels, discrimination against the vulnerable, police excesses, infrastructure, diversity in forces, state of prisons disposal of cases, etc.

This report studied the performance and perceptions of the Indian police. Notably, it reveals that minorities, especially Muslims, fear the police more than Hindus, with 64% of Muslims expressing high or moderate fear. The report doesn't address the lynching of Muslims, likely because the survey was conducted before this issue escalated. This report reveals minorities in societies were most susceptible to being falsely implicated in cases of petty crimes, Maoism, and terrorism by the police.

The study adopted mixed methodologies. It also analyses data from official sources like National Crime Records Bureau/ BPR&D and CAG reports along with an all-India perception survey conducted by the Lokniti team of the CSDS and their partners in the states.

=== Hashimpura verdict ===
On 31 October 2018, the Delhi High Court gave its verdict on Hashimpura massacre. In its verdict, the court cited the Status of Policing India Report 2018 and said that a community was being targeted for discrimination by the police. The court judgement, highlighted that the series of cases involved targeted killings of individuals belonging to a minority community, pointing towards the institutional bias within the law enforcement agents in the case.

== SPIR 2019: Police Adequacy and Working Conditions ==
The SPIR 2019 states that 50 percent of police personnel who have been surveyed feel that Muslims are likely to be "naturally prone" to committing crimes. On mob lynching, 35 percent of police personnel think that it is normal for the mob to punish the culprit in the case of suspected cow slaughter, and 43 percent think the same for the rape accused.

This report also reveals the working conditions of the police in India. The report records the police personnel's responses over the weekly off, and half the policemen said that they had not been getting any off days in a week. Necessities like clean toilets and drinking water are also not available properly in a large number of police stations. 25 percent of surveyed police personnel recorded that they worked overtime without any extra pay.

This report studied the sample survey of 11,834 police personnel across 105 locations in 21 States. This study also included a survey of around 11,000 family members of police personnel across 21 states and UTs.

== SPIR 2020-2021 Vol. I: Policing in Conflict-Affected Region ==
The State of Policing in India Report (SPIR) 2020-21 studies policing in conflict-affected areas. It focuses on areas affected by conflict, militancy or insurgency. The study surveyed 6,881 individuals – 2,276 police personnel and 4,605 civilians – across 27 districts in 11 states and union territories.

The report has taken the conflict areas based on Home Ministry data and a history of ongoing violence. It has taken on the role of the military and paramilitary forces in policing conflict zones. A series of surveys on police action involving Naxals and militants revealed that 75 per cent of police personnel and 66 per cent of the general public were of the opinion that "no matter how dangerous they are", the police should "try to catch them and follow due legal procedures".

== SPIR 2020-21 Vol. II: Policing in the Covid-19 Pandemic ==
The study tracks down the nature of policing in India during the COVID-19 pandemic. The pandemic-induced lockdowns brought police personnel into direct contact with the people in need of urgent help and assistance and modified, to a large extent, their primary role and the nature of duties performed by them during ‘normal’ times. Migrants, one of the most affected sections of society, reportedly faced the most violence at the hands of the police, with 49 percent police personnel reporting frequent use of force against migrant labourers. Confrontations between the police and residents have been reported during the nationwide lockdown. Layers of fear towards police during the pandemic were reported in the report. The police's instructions were also more likely to be perceived as threatening during this period. A majority of the migrant workers while returning to their hometowns feared that the police would beat them.

== SPIR 2023: Surveillance and the Question of Privacy ==
The SPIR 2023 focuses on Surveillance and the Question of Privacy. This report surveyed 9,779 people across 12 Indian states and UTs. This report comes out with various aspects related to the question of privacy and surveillance in policing functions in India. The report records people's perceptions of three mass surveillance tools: CCTV cameras, drones and facial recognition techniques (FRT).

The report finds that three out of four people believe CCTVs can help monitor crime and can also play a role in reducing the crime rate. The poor, tribals, Dalits and Muslims trust the police the least. Half of the respondents (51%) said CCTVs were installed in their homes or colonies, with residential areas inhabited by higher income groups far more likely to have CCTV coverage than slums and poor regions. However, in contrast, slums or poor areas (31%) are three times more likely to have CCTV cameras installed by the government than high-income residential locations (9%). This is even though poor people are the least likely to support the installation of CCTVs in their residential or workspaces compared to all other income groups.

== SPIR 2025: Police Torture and (Un)Accountability ==
The Status of Policing in India Report (SPIR) 2025 reveals statistics on police brutality and custodial torture by analysing responses of 8276 police personnel across 82 locations in 17 states. The report also found that religion, caste and political affiliations often play a decisive role in shaping perceptions of the police and influencing their actions toward arrested individuals.

According to the report, a significant percentage of policemen “justified the use of torture and violence” during their duties. The report said that 20 per cent of policemen feel that it is “very important” for the police to use harsh methods to instill fear in the public, and another 35 per cent feel that it is “somewhat important”. The report claimed that “one in four policemen strongly justifies mob violence in cases of sexual assault (27%) and child lifting/kidnapping (25%).”

The report also highlights data inconsistencies in the reporting of custodial deaths across various data sources, from government agencies to civil society. As studied in the report, in the year 2020, the National Crime Records Bureau (NCRB) reports 76 cases, the National Human Rights Commission (NHRC) reports 90 cases, while a civil society initiative, the National Campaign Against Torture (NCAT), documented 111 cases of custodial deaths in the same year.

== See also ==
- Common Cause
- Centre for the Study of Developing Societies
- Vipul Mudgal
