= Centre for Action Research and People's Development =

Women's reproductive rights group, Hyderabad

- Formation: 1989
- Headquarters: Hyderabad
- Chairperson: G.Uma Devi

Centre for Action Research and People's Development (CARPED) is an Indian nonprofit organisation based in Hyderabad, Telangana. The organisation became a registered society in 1989. It focuses on critical issues of women and children through community engagement. It is also fighting issues related to child missing and horrid practices of hysterectomy.

== History ==
CARPED was registered as a society in 1989 to facilitate better quality life to people of marginalised communities. Community participation and developing social capital are integral to the activities of the organisation. CARPED focuses its activities with special focus towards women, children and the environment. CARPED has been fighting against displacement and providing legal aid to them during first five years of its formation. Since 1994 CARPED has been working on issues of women and child welfare in the Kowdipalle mandal of Medak. It also worked on Natural Resources Management (NRM) with community participation. CARPED has been working with more than 200 NGOs.

CARPED has been successful in finding missing children and reuniting with their parents. Women from some marginalised background in Telangana go through hysterectomy to avoid menstruation as it keeps them away from working, CARPED works to solve this problem as these procedures will give rise to many physical and mental complexities.

CARPED provided COVID-19 Relief ration kits to 1700 people affected by loss of livelihoods due to lockdown.

== Programmes ==
- Promoting Child Rights, including education and health care
