= Haldipur =

- village
- Location in Karnataka, India Haldipur (India)
- Coordinates: 14°20′N 74°26′E
- Country: India
- State: Karnataka
- Region: Kanara
- District: Uttara Kannada
- Taluk: Honnavar

Population (2001)
  - Total: 10,132

Languages
  - Official: Kannada
- Time zone: UTC+5:30 (IST)

Haldipur is a village in Honnavar Taluk in Uttara Kannada District in the southern state of Karnataka, India. It is located in the Honavar taluk of Uttara Kannada district in Karnataka. A sea port is under construction.

== Demographics ==
As of 2001 India census, Haldipur had a population of 10,421 with 5,173 males and 5.248 females, with 2308 families.

As of 2011 India census, it had a population of 10,132 with 5,053 males and 5,079 females.

== Etymology ==
Previous known name was Handipura which meant hog-town. As it was an abomination to Muslim, then administrator of the area, Hyder Ali gave it its present name Haladipura signifying Turmeric-town.

== See also ==
- Districts of Karnataka
