= Shankkar Aiyar =

Indian public policy analyst

Shankkar Aiyar is an Indian political economy analyst, author, and columnist. He is currently a visiting fellow at the IDFC Institute where he focuses on economics and public policy. He has been the Wolfson Cheving Fellow at Cambridge University where he specialized in the lifecycles of emerging markets.

Aiyar's news articles in 1991, about the Indian government's pledging of its gold reserves internationally, and its subsequent plans to ship bullion outside the country, is believed to be one of the contributing factors to drawing international and Indian attention to India's impending Balance of Payments economic crisis, and subsequently accelerating efforts toward the 1991 Economic Liberalization of India.

Aiyar is a contributor to The New Indian Express, Firstpost, and BloombergQuint. He has been the recipient of the Observer Business Journalist of the year in 1992, and the Pole Star award for Best Feature in Business Journalism, in 2003.

== Books ==
As an author, Aiyar's focus is at the intersection of economics and public policy. Some of his books include:

- Aiyar, Shankkar (2012). Accidental India : a history of the nation's passage through crisis and change. New Delhi. ISBN 978-81-923280-8-9. OCLC 852389552.
- Aiyar, Shankkar (2017). Aadhaar: A Biometric History of India's 12-Digit Revolution. New Delhi: Westland. ISBN 978-9386850065.
- Aiyar, Shankkar (2020). Gated Republic : India's public policy failures and private solutions. New Delhi: Harper Collins India. ISBN 978-93-5357-387-4. OCLC 1148142862.
