= H. D. Shourie =

Indian consumer activist

Hari Dev Shourie
- Born: 1912; Lahore, British India
- Died: 28 June 2005 (aged 92–93); New Delhi, India
- Occupations: Bureaucrat, Consumer Activist

Hari Dev Shourie (1912-2005) was a well-known consumer activist in India. He was a civil servant and served the Government of India for 35 years. He died of a heart attack on 28 June 2005. He began his career in pre-partition Punjab. As a part of Indian Administrative Service he was responsible for establishing the National Productivity Council and Indian Institute of Foreign Trade. He also worked at the United Nations for 3 years.

== Biography ==
Hari Dev Shourie was born in Lahore in British India in 1912. He also served in the Indian Civil Services. He served as Director General at the Indian Institute of Foreign Trade. He was also the Deputy Commissioner of Rohtak, Haryana.

He founded Common Cause in 1980, a New Delhi-based NGO. He also edited the journal published by Common Cause on consumer rights, titled "Common Cause". He represented consumers in several Public interest litigation in India, filing over 70 petitions, many of which resulted in landmark judgements by the Supreme Court of India.Common Cause champions vital public causes and envisions an India where every citizen is respected and fairly treated.

The Government of India awarded him the Padma Bhushan and the Padma Vibhushan, the third and the second highest civilian awards. He was also named on People of the Year by the Limca Book of Records.

=== Common Cause (NGO) ===
Common Cause has worked towards probity in public life and integrity of institutions and is dedicated to championing public causes. Common Cause has worked on issues like the 2G spectrum case, Indian coal allocation scam, Advance healthcare directive, appointment of Lokpal, banning of Professional Blood Donation, etc.

== Family ==
His son is Arun Shourie, former Minister for Communications, IT and Disinvestment and one of India's best known journalists.
Another son is Deepak Shourie, managing director, Discovery Communications India.
Nalini Singh, TV journalist-anchor and managing director, TV Live India Pvt Ltd.is his daughter.

== Publications ==
Mr Shourie compiled and published "The Funniest Jokes in the World", a compilation of jokes and epigrams from all around the world with Penguin Random House India.
