= K. V. Viswanathan =

Judge of the Supreme Court of India

Kalpathy Venkataraman Viswanathan
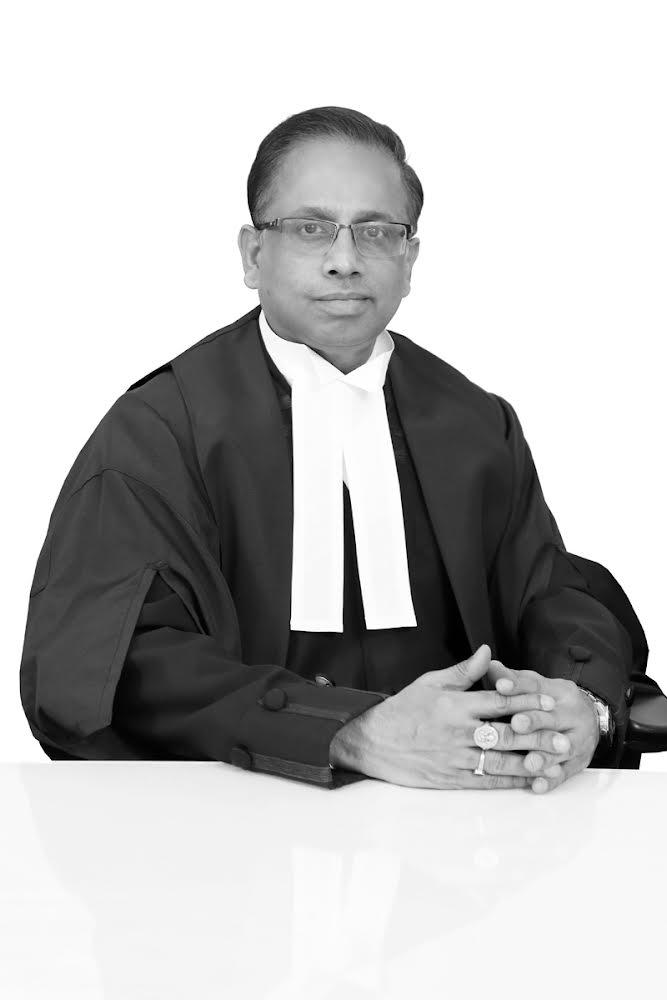

Judge of the Supreme Court of India
- Incumbent
- Assumed office 19 May 2023
- Nominated by: Dhananjaya Y. Chandrachud
- Appointed by: Droupadi Murmu

Additional Solicitor General of India
- In office 26 August 2013 – May 2014
- Appointed by: Pranab Mukherjee

Personal details
- Born: 26 May 1966 (age 60) Pollachi, Tamil Nadu, India
- Spouse: Jaishree Viswanathan
- Children: 2 daughters
- Parent(s): K.V. Venkataraman; Lalitha Venkataraman

Kalpathy Venkataraman Viswanathan (born 26 May 1966) is a judge of the Supreme Court of India.

== Career ==
Viswanathan graduated from Coimbatore Law College and enrolled in the Bar Council of Tamil Nadu in 1988.

=== Junior advocate ===
Viswanathan worked as a junior, under Senior Advocates C.S. Vaidyanathan and K. K. Venugopal from 1988 to 1995 during early years of his practice.

=== Senior advocate ===
He was designated as the senior advocate by the Supreme Court on 28 April 2009. He was appointed as the Additional Solicitor General of India on 26 August 2013 and held the position till May 2014.

As senior advocate, he argued important constitution bench cases. He represented the petitioners in the case of right to privacy, validity of Aadhaar Act and marriage equality. He represented the intervenor, Internet Freedom Foundation in the WhatsApp-Facebook Privacy case. He contributed to the court as amicus curiae in various cases, including the case concerning the validity of tenure extension for Central Bureau of Investigation and Enforcement Directorate (ED) directors and judicial appointments in lower courts. In the case challenging the validity of tenure extension for ED director, he told the court that the amendment must be scrapped "in the interest of democracy."

When Law Minister Kiren Rijiju labeled retired judges who criticized state policies as an "anti-Indian gang," it sparked significant concern. As a senior advocate, Viswanathan emphasized the gravity of the situation, stating that the use of such strong language by India's law minister to describe retired judges was troubling.

=== Supreme Court of India ===
He was appointed as a judge of the Supreme Court of India on 19 May 2023. When considering all previous appointments, he was the tenth member of the bar to have been directly appointed to the Supreme Court. He is in line to be the Chief Justice of India from 12 August 2030, to 25 May 2031. He is on track to become the fourth member directly elevated from the bar to assume the position of Chief Justice of India.
