= Nalini Singh =

Indian journalist (born 1945)

- Born: Nalini Shourie; September 1, 1945 (age 80); Jalandhar
- Occupations: Journalist and Author
- Employer: Managing Director of Tvlive India Private Limited Managing Editor at Nepal 1 Tv Channel
- Known for: Investigative Journalism
- Television: News Presenter at DD Metro Channel's (Currently known as DD News) show Aankhon Dekhi from 1990 to 2002.
- Spouse: S. P. N. Singh
- Children: Ratna Vira (daughter, Author, Daughter By Court Order Sukaran Singh (son, VP - Tata Advanced Systems)
- Family: H. D. Shourie, father Arun Shourie, brother

Nalini Singh (born September 1, 1945) is an Indian journalist.

She has been the anchor for several current affairs programs on Doordarshan, and is most known for her program, 'Aankhon Dekhi', on investigative journalism.

She had made another show - Hello Zindagi, for Doordarshan, broadcast in 1995.

== Early life ==
She is daughter of consumer rights activist, H. D. Shourie, and the sister of Indian journalists, Deepak Shourie, and Arun Shourie, who has also been a Union minister.

== Career ==
Singh is also the managing director, TV Live India Pvt Ltd, and Managing Editor of News Channel, Nepal-1.

== Personal life ==
She is also the daughter-in-law of Sir Chandeshwar Prasad Narayan Singh, former Governor of Uttar Pradesh and first Indian Ambassador to Nepal. Ratna Vira, her daughter, has written a novel named 'Daughter by Court Order' which occasioned some speculation whether it is autobiographical. Ratna gave an interview in which she described her relationship with her mother as difficult.

== Selected bibliography ==
=== Books ===
- Singh, Nalini; Jain, Devaki; Chand, Malini (1980). Women's quest for power: five Indian case studies. Sahibabad, Ghaziabad district, Delhi, India: Vikas Publishing. ISBN 9780706910216.
