= Aruna Shanbaug case =

Indian legal case regarding euthanasia

Aruna Shanbaug
- Born: Aruna Ramchandra Shanbaug; 1 June 1948; Haldipur, Karnataka, India
- Died: 18 May 2015 (aged 66); Mumbai, India
- Cause of death: Pneumonia
- Occupation: Nurse

Aruna Ramchandra Shanbaug (1 June 1948 – 18 May 2015) was an Indian nurse who was at the centre of attention in a court case on euthanasia after spending over 42 years in a vegetative state as a result of a sexual assault.

In 1973, while working as a junior nurse at King Edward Memorial Hospital, Parel, Mumbai, Shanbaug was sexually assaulted by a hospital janitor, and remained in a vegetative state afterwards. On 24 January 2011, after Shanbaug had been in this state for 37 years, the Supreme Court of India responded to a plea for euthanasia filed by journalist-activist Pinki Virani, setting up a medical panel to examine her. The court rejected the petition on 7 March 2011. However, in its landmark opinion, it allowed passive euthanasia in India.

Shanbaug died of pneumonia on 18 May 2015 after being in a persistent vegetative state for nearly 42 years.

== Background ==
=== Aruna Shanbaug ===
Aruna Ramachandra Shanbaug was born on 1 June 1948 to a Konkani-speaking Brahmin Saraswat Gowd Brahmin family in Haldipur, Karnataka. She was the eighth among six brothers and three sisters. Her father died when she was 10, after which her brothers Balakrishna and Govinda moved to Mumbai to work at Kamala Mills.

Back in the 1960s, it was not common for girls to enroll in the co-education Rural Education Society (RES) in Haldipur after finishing primary schooling where girls and boys studied separately. Shanbaug was one of the 14 girls in a class of 54 students, and the only one out of all her siblings to complete higher education. She borrowed books from seniors at school when she could not afford to buy them.

Shanbaug moved to Mumbai in 1966 with her aunt's son to pursue nursing; she was 17 at the time. She joined King Edward Memorial (KEM) Hospital as a staff nurse after three-and-a-half years, and lived at the nursing hostel, across the road, for several years.

In the months leading to the attack, Shanbaug informed her family that she wanted their support in marrying Pratap Desai, a neurosurgeon pursuing his MD at KEM. In response, the family voiced their disapproval as Desai did not belong to the same community as the Shanbaugs. During this time, Shanbaug moved to her sister Shanta's house in Worli to save money for her marriage, and for Desai to start a dispensary of his own.

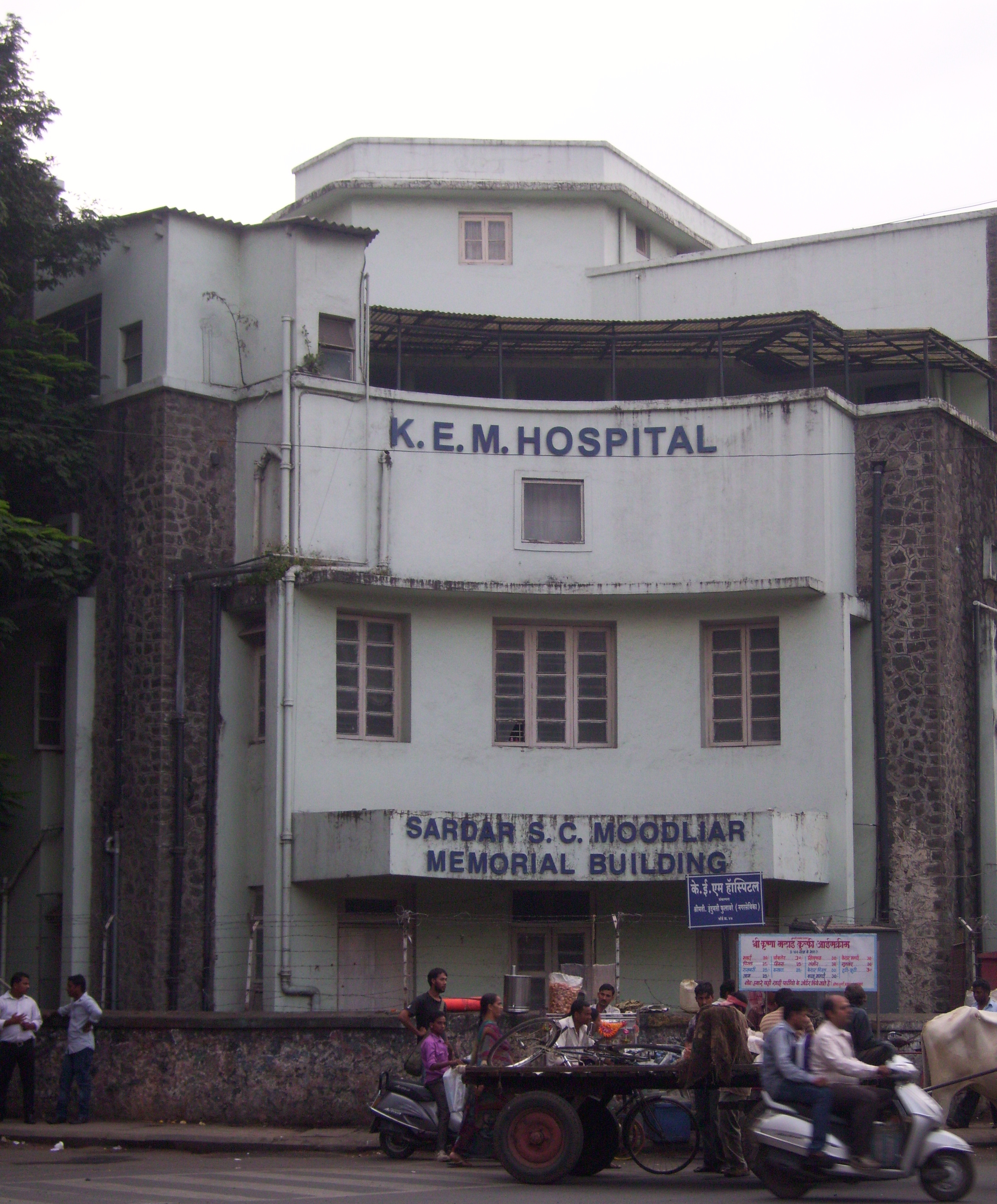
King Edward Memorial (KEM) Hospital and Seth Gordhandas Sunderdas Medical College in Parel, Mumbai (2012)

Shanbaug was in-charge of KEM's Cardiovascular Thoracic Centre, which had an experimental cardiovascular dog surgery laboratory where Sohanlal Valmiki worked as a janitor. She had reported him twice for stealing and not tending to his responsibilities. She allegedly "threatened" to report him a third time a few days before the attack.

=== Sohanlal Valmiki ===
Sohanlal Bhartha Valmiki was a janitor at KEM, and worked in the same lab as Shanbaug. His father, Bhartha Valmiki, reportedly also worked at KEM. Valmiki, then 28 years old, was married to Vimla and had a daughter who died when he was imprisoned.

In multiple interviews, he has alluded to a "troubled relationship" with Shanbaug. He claimed that she was always picking on him, choosing Valmiki, who admits to being scared of dogs, to feed the dogs and sweep the cages. According to Valmiki, Shanbaug was friendly with other KEM staff, but did not share a cordial relationship with him, and repeatedly called him Mehtar, a casteist slur. "She would give me extra work of mopping and sweeping floors and I did them silently. I also tried to tell her to change her attitude towards me but she continued," he recalled. Speaking to Hindustan Times, Valmiki said, "I told the doctor in charge and my supervisor to transfer me, I complained about her but no one listened. Who listens to a jamadar (sweeper)?"

== Attack ==
On 27 November 1973, Shanbaug, then 25 years old, was sexually assaulted by Sohanlal Valmiki, a janitor on contract at King Edward Memorial Hospital. The attack occurred while she was changing out of her uniform in the hospital basement at the end of her shift. Medical examination revealed that Valmiki choked her with a dog chain, and sodomized her after realising that Shanbaug was menstruating.

=== Valmiki's version of events ===
When describing the night of 27 November 1973, Valmiki said "there was an argument and a physical fight" when Shanbaug denied his request for a leave to visit his ill mother-in-law, and "threatened" to report him for "not working and stealing dog food" if he took a leave. Valmiki claimed Shanbaug fainted after he "got livid" and slapped her "in a fit of rage", after which he panicked and left KEM to go home. He denied raping her and said that it "must have been someone else".

== Aftermath ==
=== Discovery of Shanbaug's body ===
Shanbaug was discovered 12 hours after the attack at 7:45 am by Pramila Kushe, a KEM nurse reporting for her morning shift. "She was sitting, leaning against a stool with a dog-chain around her neck. There was blood around her," Kushe recalls, "I ran out and brought the matron. As soon as she saw matron Bellimal, her eyes welled up and tears streamed down her face. She tried to say something but could not...only her lips moved. And then, slowly she lost consciousness." She was rushed to the casualty ward by her colleagues. The lack of oxygen supply to her brain resulted in a brain stem contusion, cervical cord injury, and cortical blindness. While her eyes could technically "see", her brain could no longer register images. Due to severe brain damage, the attending doctors and nurses soon realized that Shanbaug was in persistent vegetative state with no scope for improvement.

When she did not return home on the night of the attack, Shanbaug's sister, who was used to her irregular work schedule, was not immediately concerned. She received a call from KEM the next day informing her that Shanbaug had been attacked. On the contrary, Mid-Day reported that Shanbaug's family only found out about the attack after her friends visited Shanta's home. "I still remember the day," Shanta's daughter Mangala recalled, "It was 10 am and we had prepared idlis for breakfast, as Aruna liked them. Her friend rushed into the house and said that Aruna isn't feeling well. Only after reaching the hospital did we find out about the actual incident."

=== Nurse strike ===
The attack sparked independent India's first nurse strike, with nurses in Mumbai demanding justice and treatment for Shanbaug and better protection and working conditions for themselves. In the 1980s, the Municipal Corporation of Greater Mumbai (BMC) made two attempts to move Shanbaug outside the KEM Hospital to free the bed she had been occupying for seven years. KEM nurses launched a protest, and the BMC abandoned the plan.

=== Criminal proceedings and conviction ===
Mumbai police team under Commissioner MS Mugwe launched a manhunt to locate Valmiki; he was apprehended in Pune. He was charged under Sections 307 (attempted murder) and 397 (robbery) of the Indian Penal Code (IPC) for stealing Shanbaug's watch and earrings after the attack. During Mumbai sessions court trial, he was found guilty on both counts and sentenced to seven years' imprisonment (the maximum under the two charges). The judgment said "the accused had gone there with the intention to rape" and yet Valmiki was never charged with rape. The police records and First Information Report (FIR) include no mention of rape. According to a The Times of India report, the then dean of KEM Dr. Deshpande omitted details of Shanbaug's sodomization to spare her fiancé, Desai, from "public embarrassment". Desai was also discouraged from being a complainant on her case. Instead, a sub-inspector became the designated complainant as no one else was willing.

The medical examination for Shanbaug used the controversial "two-finger-test" that entails insertion of two fingers into the vaginal cavity to inspect the hymen of victims of sexual offences. Following the 2012 Nirbhaya gang rape and murder case, the Ministry of Health and Family Welfare, Government of India, issued fresh guidelines for medico-legal care for sexual violence survivors that banned the test. Moreover, until the passage of 2013 Criminal Law (Amendment) Act, the definition of rape under IPC's Section 375 did not extend to acts in addition to vaginal penetration. In her book Aruna's Story: The True Account of a Rape and its Aftermath (1998), journalist and human rights activist Pinki Virani wrote: "[Valmiki] was not sentenced for rape because he had not committed the rape vaginally; it was anal."

=== Release and life after ===
Valmiki was released from prison after serving six years; he spent one year under trial. For years after, his whereabouts were unknown.

Pinki Virani attempted to track him down; she believed that Valmiki changed his name after leaving prison but continued to work in a Delhi hospital. Since neither the King Edward Memorial Hospital nor the court that tried Valmiki kept a file photo of him, Virani's search failed. Other reports claimed he had subsequently died of AIDS or tuberculosis.

Shortly after Shanbaug's death was announced, however, Valmiki was tracked down by Mumbai-based journalist Dnyanesh Chavan from the Marathi daily Sakal to his father-in-law's village of Parpa in western Uttar Pradesh. He was found to be still living, married with a family, and working as a labourer and cleaner in a power station. After his release from prison, he returned to his ancestral village of Dadupur in western Uttar Pradesh before moving to Parpa in the late 1980s.

== Later information ==
=== Allegations of familial abandonment ===
As of 2011, Shanta had not visited Shanbaug in decades. "I used to go in the afternoons to see her and then come back home [to] work which became very difficult. Once my children got married, I couldn't go," she said. "I feel sorry for her, but what can I do? If I go now, they'll force me to bring her back. Where will I keep her? I live in someone else's house." Contrary to KEM staff's allegations of familial abandonment, Shanta's children Mangala, Savitri and Vinayak said they looked after Shanbaug for more than twelve years after the attack. According to Savitri, they did everything they could to take care of her. "I remember going to the hospital with tiffin boxes. We cleaned her up, washed her and did everything possible till the time we could," she told Mid-Day. The siblings moved to different parts of Mumbai after marriage, and visiting Shanbaug became difficult. "We lived far off and even our mother wasn't well. We also had our families to take care of, and it was possible to check on Aruna only occasionally. But we never abandoned her. We used to visit her once or twice a month," Mangala said.

When a journalist contacted Balakrishna, Shanbaug's eldest brother, he was informed that Balakrishna had stopped visiting KEM "because of fear of pressure to take his sister home." Balakrishna died of cancer in 2013; he was living in Bengaluru at the time of his death. His daughter denies that the family abandoned Shanbaug. She said her father visited KEM several times until a change in hospital management made it difficult to continue seeing Shanbaug. Balakrishna was preceded in death by Shanbaug's second eldest brother, Govinda, based in Ratnagiri, and a third Sadananda, who worked in Honnavar.

Anand, her youngest brother and one of her few relatives still living in Haldipur, visited Shanbaug a few times with his wife Bhagirathi between 1981 and 1987. He ran a small restaurant in Ghatkopar at the time. "Every time, the doctors would ask us to take her. We could not do that. In the end, my husband began dreading going to the hospital," Bhagirathi told The Indian Express. Anand died in 2012.

Shanbaug's brothers Gajanana and Prabhakar, who suffered from mental disorder, would stop any vehicle going past Haldipur to enquire if she was in it. "Villagers knew what had happened to Aruna," Mangala clarified. "They would tell them she was coming in the next vehicle." The brothers were reportedly homeless, and survived on scraps from stores around the village. Gajanana died in an accident involving a temple chariot, while Prabhakar passed away as a result of malnutrition.

Shyamala, Shanbaug's younger sister, never saw her after the attack. "We had no means to support her or pay for her hospital expenses. Like me, my sister Shanta, who stayed in Mumbai, an also abandoned Aruna due to financial constraints," she told The Times of India after Shanbaug's death in 2015.

No one from Shanbaug's family lived in Haldipur at the time of her death. Their ancestral property–four houses built next to each other to accommodate Shanbaug's father and three brothers–was deserted. Initially made of dried grass, Garave Nivas was converted into Mangalore-tiled pucca house in 1963.

=== Similarities to 2024 Kolkata rape and murder case ===
During a suo moto hearing for the 2024 murder of a junior doctor at Kolkata's RG Kar Medical College and Hospital, Supreme Court Chief Justice D Y Chandrachud made a reference to Shanbaug's attack. "Due to ingrained patriarchal biases, the relatives of patients are more likely to attack the women doctors and they are more susceptible to sexual violence too and Aruna Shanbaug case is a case in point. Gender violence shows [a] lack of safety for women in the system," he said. Chandrachud also highlighted other instances of violence against medical professionals in West Bengal, Bihar and Hyderabad, calling the lack of safe working conditions for healthcare workers "deeply" concerning.

=== Shanbaug's fiancé comes forward ===
For years, Desai was referred to as Dr Sundeep Sardesai in media reports and in Virani's book. He revealed his identify for the first time while speaking to Mumbai Mirror after Shanbaug's death.

As of 2015, Desai is a physician with his own private practice in Dadar. He completed his MD from KEM, and joined the hospital as a senior registrar in 1973. He remembers Shanbaug as "very dedicated to her work" as a result of which she was posted to the neurosurgery department within three years of joining KEM–something that otherwise requires several years of experience. He said senior doctors preferred Shanbaug to assist during complex surgeries, and she never refused to help even when doctors called her at night after she had finished her day shift.

Desai found out about the attack the day after. "I could not believe my eyes when I saw her. Aruna, who always had a radiant smile on her face, was lying on bed, unable to recognise anyone. Being a doctor, I immediately knew what her condition was," he said. The young doctor left KEM in 1974, but continued to visit Shanbaug regularly for the next three years. "Every time, I would try to speak to her," he told Mumbai Mirror. "But her condition never improved and it became really painful to see her like that." Desai got married in 1977 after "tremendous pressure from the family."

Desai said he "never missed a single story written about Aruna" and believed that "stigma a rape victims carries with her and the way society perceives her has still not changed" in the last four decades.

== Supreme Court case ==
=== Aruna Shanbaug v Union of India (2011) ===
On 17 December 2010, the Supreme Court, while admitting the plea to end the life made by activist-journalist Pinki Virani, sought a report on Shanbaug's medical condition from the hospital in Mumbai and the government of Maharashtra. On 24 January 2011, a three-member medical panel was established under the Supreme Court's directive. After examining Shanbaug, the panel concluded that she met "most of the criteria of being in a permanent vegetative state".

On 7 March 2011, the Supreme Court, in a landmark judgement, issued a set of broad guidelines legalizing passive euthanasia in India. These guidelines for passive euthanasia—i.e. the decision to withdraw treatment, nutrition, or water—establish that the decision to discontinue life support must be taken by parents, spouse, or other close relatives, or in the absence of them, by a "next friend". The decision also requires court approval.

In its judgement, the court declined to recognize Virani as the "next friend" of Aruna Shanbaug, and instead treated the KEM hospital staff as the "next friend."

We do not mean to decry or disparage what Ms. Pinki Virani has done. Rather, we wish to express our appreciation of the splendid social spirit she has shown. We have seen on the internet that she has been espousing many social causes, and we hold her in high esteem. All that we wish to say is that however much her interest in Aruna Shanbaug may be it cannot match the involvement of the KEM hospital staff who have been taking care of Aruna day and night for 38 years.

Since the KEM Hospital staff wished that Aruna Shanbaug be allowed to live, Virani's petition to withdraw life support was declined. However, the court further stipulated that the KEM hospital staff, with the approval of the Bombay High Court, had the option of withdrawing life support if they changed their mind:

However, assuming that the KEM hospital staff at some future time changes its mind, in our opinion in such a situation the KEM hospital would have to apply to the Bombay High Court for approval of the decision to withdraw life support.

=== Common Cause v Union of India (2018) ===
On 25 February 2014, while hearing a PIL filed by NGO Common Cause, a three-judge bench of the Supreme Court of India said that the prior opinion in the Aruna Shanbaug case was based on a wrong interpretation of the Constitution Bench's opinion in Gian Kaur v. State of Punjab. The court also determined that the opinion was internally inconsistent because although it held that euthanasia can be allowed only by an act of the legislature, it then proceeded to judicially establish euthanasia guidelines. The court referred the issue to a larger Constitution Bench for resolution, writing:

In view of the inconsistent opinions rendered in Aruna Shanbaug (supra) and also considering the important question of law involved which needs to be reflected in the light of social, legal, medical and constitutional perspective, it becomes extremely important to have a clear enunciation of law. Thus, in our cogent opinion, the question of law involved requires careful consideration by a Constitution Bench of this Court for the benefit of humanity as a whole.

=== Response ===
Following the Supreme Court decision rejecting the plea, the nursing staff at the hospital—who had opposed the petition and had been looking after Shanbaug since she had lapsed into a vegetative state—distributed sweets and cut a cake to celebrate what they termed her "rebirth". A senior nurse at the hospital later said, "We have to tend to her just like a small child at home. She only keeps aging like any of us, does not create any problems for us. We take turns looking after her and we love to care for her. How can anybody think of taking her life?"

Pinki Virani's lawyer, Shubhangi Tulli, decided not to file an appeal, saying "the two-judge ruling was final till the SC decided to constitute a larger bench to re-examine the issue." Pinki Virani said, "Because of this woman who has never received justice, no other person in a similar position will have to suffer for more than three and a half decades."

== Death ==
A few days before her death, Shanbaug was diagnosed with pneumonia. She was moved to the medical intensive care unit (MICU) of the hospital and put on a ventilator. She died the morning of 18 May 2015. Her funeral was performed by the hospital nurses and other staff members.

== In popular culture ==
A non-fiction book about the case titled Aruna's Story was written by Pinki Virani in 1998. Duttakumar Desai wrote the Marathi play Katha Arunachi from 1994–1995; it was performed at college level and subsequently staged by Vinay Apte in 2002.

A Gujarati fiction novel, Jad Chetan, was written by popular novelist Harkisan Mehta in 1985 and was based on Shanbaug's case.

Anumol played Shanbaug in the 2014 Malayalam film Maram Peyyumbol.

A part of the plot of the marathi film Janiva mentions the case and its subsequent impact.

Shanbaug's story was also portrayed in the series Crime Patrol.

In June 2020, the Ullu web series KASAK, which is based on the case, was released. The role of Sheetal, Shanbaug's stand-in, is portrayed by Ihana Dhillon.
