= Indian coal allocation scam =

2010s political scandal in India

The coal allocation scam, dubbed in the media as Coalgate, was a major political scandal concerning the Indian government's allocation of the nation's coal deposits to public sector enterprise (PSEs) and private companies. In a draft report issued in March 2012, the Comptroller and Auditor General of India (CAG) office accused the Government of India of allocating coal blocks in an inefficient manner during the period 2004–2009. Over the summer of 2012, resulting in a Central Bureau of Investigation probe into whether the allocation of the coal blocks was in fact influenced by corruption. In July 2026, the Supreme Court accepted the closure report of CBI and closed the coal block allocation case against former PM Manmohan Singh highlighting that there was no sufficient evidence to register a corruption case.

The essence of the CAG's argument is that the Government had the authority to allocate coal blocks by a process of competitive bidding, but chose not to. As a result, both public sector enterprises (PSEs) and private firms paid less than they might have otherwise. In its draft report in March the CAG estimated the "windfall gain" to the allocatees was ₹10,673 billion (US$110 billion). The CAG Final Report tabled in Parliament put the figure at ₹1,856 billion (US$20 billion) On 27 August 2012 Indian prime minister Manmohan Singh read a statement in Parliament rebutting the CAG's report both in its reading of the law and the alleged cost of the government's policies.

While the initial CAG report suggested that coal blocks could have been allocated more efficiently, resulting in more revenue to the government, at no point did it suggest that corruption was involved in the allocation of coal. Over the course of 2012, however, the question of corruption has come to dominate the discussion. In response to a complaint by the BJP, the Central Vigilance Commission (CVC) directed the CBI to investigate the matters in a First Information Report (FIR), the first step in a criminal investigation. These FIRs accuse them of overstating their net worth, failing to disclose prior coal allocations, and hoarding rather than developing coal allocations. The CBI officials investigating the case have speculated that bribery may be involved.

The issue has received massive media reaction and public outrage. During the monsoon session of the Parliament, the BJP's leader Hansraj Gangaram Ahir protested the Government's handling of the issue demanding the resignation of the prime minister and refused to have a debate in the Parliament. The deadlock resulted in Parliament functioning only seven of the twenty days of the session. The Parliamentary Standing Committee report on Coal and Steel states that all coal blocks distributed between 1993 and 2008 were done in an unauthorized manner and allotment of all mines where production is yet to start should be cancelled. In 2015, Coal auction helped state government earn 80,000 Crore (80,000,000,000 INR) after sales of 11 coal blocks.

== 1992–2010. Background to Coalgate: history of coal allocation in India ==
=== The coal allocation process ===
"In July 1992 Ministry of Coal, issued the instructions for constitution of a Screening Committee for screening proposals received for captive mining by private power generation companies." The Committee was composed of government officials from the Ministry of Coal, the Ministry of Railways, and the relevant state government. "A number of coal blocks, which were not in the production plan of CIL and … SSCL, were identified in consultation with CIL/SSCL and a list of 143 coal blocks were prepared and placed on the website of the MOC for information of public at large."

=== Findings by High Court of Orissa (2011) ===
Coal allocation guidelines

The guidelines for the Screening Committee suggest that preference be given to the power and steel sectors (and to large projects within those sectors). They further suggest that in the case of competing applicants for a captive block, a further 10 guidelines may be taken into consideration:

- status (stage) level of progress and state of preparedness of the projects;
- net worth of the applicant company (or in the case of a new SP/JV, the net worth of their principals);
- production capacity as proposed in the application;
- maximum recoverable reserve as proposed in the application;
- date of commissioning of captive mine as proposed in the application;
- date of completion of detailed exploration (in respect of unexplored blocks only) as proposed in the application;
- technical experience (in terms of existing capacities in coal/lignite mining and specified end-use);
- recommendation of the administrative ministry concerned;
- recommendation of the state government concerned (i.e., where the captive block is located);
- track record and financial strength of the company.

Results of the coal allocation program The response submitted in response to the 2011 PIL at Orissa on the allocation process between 2003 and 2009 was spectacular, with some 44 billion metric tons of coal being allocated to public and private firms. By way of comparison, the entire world only produces 7.8 billion tons annually, with India being responsible for 585 million tons of this amount. Under the program, then, captive firms were allocated vast amounts of coal, equating to hundreds of years of supply, for a nominal fee.

Year of allocation	Government companies		Private companies		Power projects		Total	
	No. of blocks	GR (in MT)	No. of blocks	GR (in MT)	No. of blocks	GR (in MT)	No. of blocks	GR (in MT)
Up to 2005	29	6,294.72	41	3,336.88	0	0	70	9,631.6
2006	32	12,363.15	15	3,793.14	6	1,635.24	53	17,791.53
2007	34	8,779.08	17	2,111.14	1	972	52	11,862.22
2008	3	509.99	20	2,939.53	1	100	24	3,549.52
2009	1	337	12	5,216.53	3	1,339.02	16	6,892.55
2010	0	0	0	0	1	800	1	800
Total	99	28,283.94	105	17,397.22	12	4,846.26	216	50,527.42

Out of the above 216 blocks, 24 blocks were de-allocated (three blocks in 2003, two blocks in 2006, one block in 2008, one block in 2009, three blocks in 2010, and 14 blocks in 2011) for non-performance of production by the allocates, and two de-allocated blocks were subsequently reallocated (2003 and 2005) to others. Hence, 194 coal blocks, with aggregates geological reserves of 44.44 billion metric tons, stood allocated as at 31 March 2011.

Source: Draft CAG Report, Table 5.1.

Given the inherent subjectivity in some of the allocation guidelines, as well as the potential conflicts between guidelines (how does one choose between a small capacity/late stage project and a large capacity/early stage project?) it is unsurprising that in reviewing the allocation process from 1993 to 2005 the CAG says that "there was no clearly spelt out criteria for the allocation of coal mines." In 2005 the Expert Committee on Coal Sector Reforms provided recommendations on improving the allocation process, and in 2010 the Mines and Minerals (Development and Regulation) Act (MMDR Act), 1957 Amendment Bill was enacted, providing for coal blocks to be sold through a system of competitive bidding.

The foregoing supports the following conclusions:

- The allocation process prior to 2010 allowed some firms to obtain valuable coal blocks at a nominal expense
- The eligible firms took up this option and obtained control of vast amounts of coal in the period 2005–09
- The criteria employed for awarding coal allocations were opaque and in some respects subjective.

== March 2012. Draft CAG Report on Coalgate ==
Overview

The CAG report, leaked to the press in March as a draft and tabled in Parliament in August, is a performance audit focusing on the allocation of coal blocks and the performance of Coal India in the 2005–09 period. The Draft Report, stretching to over 100 pages—far more detailed and containing more explosive allegations than the toned-down Final Report of some 50 pages—was the document that sparked the Coalgate furor. The Draft Report covers the following topics:

1. Overview (pp. 1–2)
2. Audit Framework (pp. 3–4)
3. Institutional Framework (p. 5–10)
4. Gaps in Supply and Demand (p. 11–17)
5. Coal Blocks-Allocation and Production Performance (p. 18–55)
6. Production Performance of CIL (p. 56–83)
7. Conclusion and Recommendations (pp. 84–88)
8. Annexures (pp. 89–110)

As far as Coalgate is concerned, the key passages of the Draft Report are in Chapter 5, where the CAG charges that:

- In 2005 the Government had the legal authority to allocate coal blocks by auction rather than the Screening Committee, but chose not to do so.
- As a result of its failure to auction the coal blocks, public and private companies obtained "windfall gains" of ₹10,673 billion (US$110 billion), with private companies obtaining ₹4,795 billion (US$51 billion) (45%) and government companies obtaining ₹5,078 billion (US$54 billion) (55%).

The most important assertion of the CAG Draft Report is that the Government had the legal authority to auction the coal, but chose not to do so. Any losses as a result of coal allocations, then, between 2005 and 2009 are seen by the CAG as being the responsibility of the Government. The answer to this question turns on whether the Government could institute competitive bidding by an administrative decision under the current statute or whether it needed to amend the statute to do so.

The CAG devotes ten pages of its report to reviewing the legal basis for an auction, and comes to the following conclusion:

In sum there were a series of correspondences with the Ministry for Law and Justice for drawing conclusion on the legal feasibility of the proposed amendments to the CMN Act/MMDR Act or through Administrative order to introduce auctioning/competitive bidding process for allocation of coal blocks for captive mining. In fact, there was no legal impediment to introduction of transparent and objective process of competitive bidding for allocation of coal blocks for captive mining as per the legal opinion of July 2006 of the Ministry of Law and Justices and this could have been done through an Administrative decision. However, the Ministry of Coal went ahead for allocation of coal blocks through Screening Committee and advertised in September 2006 for allocation of 38 coal blocks and continued with this process until 2009.

Other parts of the report, however, suggest that while an administrative decision might be sufficient legal basis for instituting competitive bidding, the "legal footing" of competitive bidding would be improved if the statute were amended to specifically provide for it. i.e. there were some questions around the legality of using an administrative decision as the ground for an auction process under the current statute. Quoting the Law Secretary in August 2006:

there is no express statutory provision providing for the manner of allocating coal blocks, it is done through a mechanism of Inter-Ministerial Group called the Screening Committee ... The Screening Committee had been constituted by means of administrative guidelines. Since, under the current dispensation, the allocation of coal blocks is purely administrative in nature, it was felt that the process of auction through competitive bidding can also be done through such administrative arrangements. In fact, this is the basis of our earlier legal advice. This according to the administrative Ministry has been questioned from time to time for legal sanction. If provision is made for competitive bidding in the Act itself or by virtue of rules framed under the Act the bidding process would definitely placed on a higher level of legal footing.

So while the CAG certainly makes the case that the Government had legal grounds on which to introduce competitive bidding into the coal allocation process, saying that there was "no legal impediment" to doing so perhaps overstates their case.

=== Second CAG charge: "windfall gains to the allocatees were ₹10,673 billion (US$110 billion) ===
If the most important charge made by the CAG was that of the Government's legal authority to auction the coal blocks, the one that drew the most attention was certainly the size of the "windfall gain" accruing to the allocates. On pp. 32–34 of the Draft Report, the CAG estimates these to be ₹10,673 billion (US$110 billion) with details in the following table:

Windfall gains to allocatees (in ₹ crore)
Calendar year	Government companies			Private companies			Government + private companies		
	90% of GR in MT	Windfall gain historic rates	Windfall gain Mar 2011 rates	90% of GR in MT	Windfall gain historic rates	Windfall gain Mar 2011 rates	90% of GR in MT	Windfall gain historic rates	Windfall gain Mar 2011 rates
2004	1,709	45,807	56,949	0	0	0	1,709	45,807	56,949
2005	1,388	34,056	45,561	1,776	39,146	85,523	3,163	73,203	131,084
2006	8,660	185,119	259,547	3,011	62,085	111,764	11,671	247,204	371,311
2007	7,000	64,066	207,098	1,747	38,284	51,502	8,746	102,350	258,599
2008	288	6,704	7,364	2,682	54,445	80,137	2,970	61,149	87,501
2009	303	2,438	11,285	4,605	99,735	150,574	4,908	102,174	161,859
Total	19,349	337,471	587,803	13,820	293,695	479,500	33,169	631,166	1,067,303

The table employs the following calculations for windfall gain:

- windfall gain/ton = market price/ton – production cost/ton

- windfall gain = windfall gain/ton x number of tons allocated x 90% (to reflect 90% confidence in the geology of the reserve)

Although the windfall gain/ton is fairly modest ₹322 (US$3.40), because of the vast size of the coal allocations, the total figure for the windfall gain is very large. The figure stated as a windfall gain would in fact accrue to the allocatee over the life of the reserve, which would likely exceed 100 years. Thus, using any reasonable discount rate, the Present value of the windfall gain will be dramatically smaller (perhaps one tenth) of the windfall gain stated in the CAG Report.

While the headline number of ₹10,673 billion (US$110 billion) was sure to attract the attention of the public, in the Annexures to the report the CAG listed the windfall gains by company, allowing readers to see who exactly benefited from the allocation program, and by how much. The resulting list, a veritable "who's who" of Indian commerce, ensured that the topic of coal allocations would be one of the most written about stories of 2012.

== March–August 2012. Coalgate grows: the media, the BJP, and the CBI and income tax investigation ==
On 22 March, the Times of India broke the story on the contents of the Draft CAG Report:

NEW DELHI: The CAG is at it again. About 16 months after it rocked the UPA government with its explosive report on allocation of 2G spectrum and license, the Comptroller & Auditor General's draft report titled 'Performance Audit of Coal Block Allocations' says the government has extended "undue benefits", totaling a mind-boggling Rs 10.67 trillion (short scale), to commercial entities by giving them 155 coal acreages without auction between 2004 and 2009. The beneficiaries include some 100 private companies, as well as some public sector units, in industries such as power, steel and cement. The Income Tax Department was also roped in to look into the financial frauds and follow the money trail.

The story listed the following companies as the leading beneficiaries of the coal allocations:

Windfall gains to allocatees (in ₹ crore)
Private sector		Public sector	
Company	Gains	Company	Gains
Strategic Energy Tech System (Tata-Sasol)	33,060	NTPC Limited	35,024
Electro Steel Casting	26,320	TNEB & MSMCL	26,584
Jindal Steel and Power	21,226	NTPC	22,301
Bhushan Power & Steel Ltd & others	15,967	JSEB & BSMDC	18,648
Ram Swarup & others	15,633	MMTC	18,628
JSPL & Gagan Sponge Iron Ltd	12,767	WBPDCL	17,358
MCL/JSW/JPL & others	10,419	CMDC	16,498
Tata Steel Ltd	7,161	MSEB & GSECL	15,335
Chhattisgarh Captive Coal Co Ltd	7,023	JSMDCL	11,988
CESC Ltd & J&S Infrastructure	6,851	MPSMCL	9,947

=== Allegations against S. Jagathrakshakan ===
In September 2012, several news reports alleged that family of S. Jagathrakshakan, Minister of State for Information and Broadcasting in the UPA government is a part of a company named JR Power Gen Pvt Ltd which was awarded a coal block in Odisha in 2007. It was the same company which formed a joint venture with a public sector company, Puducherry Industrial Promotion Development and Investment (PIPDIC), on 17 January 2007. Barely five days after, PIPDIC was allotted a coal block. According to the MoU, JR Power enjoyed a stake in this allotment. However, JR Power had no expertise in thermal power, iron and steel, or cement, the key sectors for consumption of coal. Later, in 2010, JR Power sold 51% stake to KSK Energy Ventures, an established player with interests in the energy sector. In this way, the rights for the use of the coal block ultimately passed on to KSK.

Reacting to this ,S. Jagathrakshakan admitted to getting a coal block, and said that, "It is true that we got a coal allocation but it was a sub-contract with Puducherry government and then we gave it away to KSK company. Now, we have got nothing to do with the allocation but if the government wants to take back the allocation it can do so."

=== Allegations against Subodh Kant Sahay ===
In September 2012, it was revealed that Subodh Kant Sahay, Tourism Minister in the UPA government sent a letter to prime minister Manmohan Singh trying to persuade him for allocation of a coal block to a company, SKS ISPAT and Power which has Sudhir Sahay, his younger brother, as honorary Executive Director. The letter was written on 5 February 2008. On the very next day, Prime Minister's Office (PMO) sent a letter to the coal secretary on 6 February 2008, recommending allotment of coal blocks to the company. However, Sahay denied these allegations, citing that the coal block was allocated to SKS ISPAT, where his brother was only an "honorary director".

On 15 September 2012, an Inter Ministerial Group (IMG) headed by Zohra Chatterji (Additional Secretary in Coal Ministry) recommended cancellation of a block allotted to SKS ISPAT and Power.

=== Allegations against Ajay Sancheti and his link with Nitin Gadkari ===
Ajay Sancheti's SMS Infrastructure Ltd. was allegedly allocated coal blocks in Chhattisgarh at low rates. He is a BJP Rajya Sabha MP and is believed to be in close relation with Nitin Gadkari. According to the CAG, the allocation of the coal block to SMS Infrastructure Ltd. has caused a loss of Rs. 10 billion.

=== Allegations against Vijay J. Darda ===
Vijay J. Darda, a Congress MP, have been accused of direct and active involvement in the affairs of three companies JLD Yavatmal Energy Limited, JAS Infrastructure & Power Ltd., AMR Iron & Steel Pvt. Ltd, which received coal blocks illegally by means of inflating their financial statements and overriding the legal tender process.

=== Allegations against Prem Chand Gupta ===
UPA partner Rashtriya Janata Dal's leader Prem Chand Gupta Gupta's sons' company, new in the steel business applied for a coal block when Prem Chand Gupta was the Union minister for corporate affairs and secured it about a month after his tenure ended along with that of his government. The company in question is IST Steel & Power – an associate company of the IST Group, which is owned and run by Prem Chand Guptas two sons Mayur and Gaurav. IST Steel, along with cement majors Gujarat Ambuja and Lafarge, was allocated the Dahegaon / Makardhokra IV block in Maharashtra. The company, which applied for a block on 12 January 2007, and was awarded it on 17 June 2009, is sitting on reserves of 70.74 million tons. The reserves it controls are more than the combined reserves held by much larger companies – Gujarat Ambuja and Lafarge. Gupta, who belongs to the Rashtriya Janata Dal headed by Bihar leader Lalu Prasad Yadav, was the minister of state for corporate affairs in UPA-I when his party was a constituent of the Congress-led coalition with 21 seats in Lok Sabha. However Mr Gupta maintains he had no involvement in IST Steel and denies influencing the coal-block allocation process.

=== Allegations against Naveen Jindal ===
Congress. MP, Naveen Jindal's Jindal Steel and Power got a coalfield in February 2009 with reserves of 1500 million metric tons while the government-run Navratna Coal India Ltd was refused.

On 27 February 2009, two private companies got huge coal blocks. Both the blocks were in Orissa and while one was over 300 mega metric tons, the other was over 1500 mega metric tons. Combined worth of these blocks was well over Rs 2 trillion (short scale) and these blocks were meant for the liquification of coal. One of these blocks was awarded to Jindal. Naveen Jindal's Jindal Steel and Power was the company which was allotted the Talcher coal field in Angul in Orissa in 2009, well after the self-imposed cut off date by the Centre on allocation of coal blocks.

The Opposition alleged that the Government violated all norms to give him coal fields. Naveen Jindal, however, denied any wrongdoing.

On 15 September 2012, an Inter Ministerial Group (IMG) headed by Zohra Chatterji (Additional Secretary in Coal Ministry) recommended cancellation of a block allotted to JSW (Jindal Steel Works), a Jindal Group company.

On 11 June 2013, CBI has booked former Minister of State for Coal Dasari Narayan Rao and Congress MP Naveen Jindal for alleged cheating, graft and criminal misconduct in its 12th FIR in the coal blocks allocation scam.

=== BJP response ===
In response to the Times of India story there was an uproar in Parliament, with the BJP charging the government with corruption and demanding a court-monitored probe into coal allocations:

'The CWG scam is (to the tune) of Rs 700 billion, 2G scam is Rs 1.76 trillion (short scale). But, now the new coal scam is Rs 10.67 trillion (short scale). It is a government of scams... from airwaves to mining, everywhere the government is involved in scams,' party spokesperson Prakash Javadekar told reporters.

=== CBI and income tax investigation ===
On 31 May 2012, Central Vigilance Commission (CVC) based on a complaint of two Bharatiya Janata Party Member of Parliament Prakash Javadekar and Hansraj Gangaram Ahir directed a CBI enquiry.Income Tax Department also started an enquiry based on the reference by the two BJP MP's.

There were leaks of the report in media in March 2012 which claimed the figure to be around ₹10,600 billion (US$110 billion). It is called by the media as the Mother of all Scams. Discussion about the issue was placed in the Parliament on 26 Aug 2012 by the prime minister Manmohan Singh with wide protests from the opposition.

According to the Comptroller and Auditor General of India, this is a leak of the initial draft and the details being brought out were observations which are under discussion at a very preliminary stage. On 29 May 2012, Prime Minister Manmohan Singh offered to give up his public life if found guilty in this scam.

=== Formation of Inter-Ministerial Group (IMG) ===
At the end of June 2012, coal ministry decided to form an Inter-Ministerial Group (IMG), to decide on either de-allocation or forfeiting the Bank Guarantees (BG) of the companies that did not develop allotted coal blocks. Zohra Chatterji, additional secretary, coal ministry was named as Chairman of the IMG. Other IMG members include representatives from power, steel, departments of economic affairs, industrial policy and promotion, and law and justice.

Significantly, the decision was taken after the CVC had already ordered a CBI enquiry into alleged irregularities.

As of 26 September 2012, the IMG had reviewed 31 coal blocks. Out of these, it recommended de-allocation of 13 coal blocks and encashment of bank guarantees of 14 allottees.

Sr No	Name of company	Location	Recommendation (cancellation or deduction of BG)	Remarks	Source
1	Castron Mining Ltd	Bramhadih, Jharkhand	Deallocate	Was allocated in 1996	
2	Field Mining and Ispat Ltd	Chinora and Warora (southern part), Maharashtra	Deallocate	Was allocated in 2003	
3	Domco Smokeless Fuels Pvt. Ltd	the Lalgarh (North) West Bokaro, Jharkhand	Deallocate	Was allocated in 2005	
4	Monnet Ispat & Energy Ltd.	Utkal B2, Orissa	Asked to submit BG of 3 years' royalty, failing which the block may be de-allocated	Was allocated in 1999	
5	Shri Virangana Steels Ltd	Marki Mangli-II, III and IV blocks in Maharashtra	Deduction of BG		
6	Adhunik Metaliks, Adhunik Corporation, Orissa Sponge Iron, Deepak Steel & Power, SMC Power Generation Ltd, Metaliks Ltd, Visa Steel Ltd.	New Patrapara, Orissa	Deallocate		
7	SKS Ispat	Rawanwara North, Madhya Pradesh	Deallocate		
8	Tata Sponge	Radhikapur East, Orissa	Deduction of BG		
9	Bhushan Steel	Bijahan, Orissa	Deduction of BG		
10	Himachal EMTA Power Ltd & JSW Steel Ltd	Gourangdih ABC	Deallocate	Was allocated in 2009	
11	Gupta Metaliks & Power Ltd & Gupta Coalfields Ltd	Nerad Malegaon	Deduction of BG		
12	Usha martin Ltd	Lohari	Deduction of BG		
13	Electrosteel Castings	North Dhadu	Deallocate		
14		Choritand Telaiya	Deallocate		
15	Maharashtra Seamless	Gondkhari	Deallocate		
16	ArcelorMittal and GVK Power	Seregarha	Deduction of BG		
17	Jayaswal Neco	Moitra	Deduction of BG		
18	Neelachal Iron & Steel	Dumri	Deduction of BG		
19	DB Power	Durgapur II/ Sariya	Deduction of BG		
20	IST Steel and Power Ltd, Gujarat Ambuja Cement and Lafarge India	Dahegaon-Makardhokra IV, Maharashtra	Deallocate	The block was allocated on 17 June 2009. IST Steel and Power is owned by Mayur and Gaurav Gupta, sons of former Union corporate affairs minister Prem Chand Gupta.	
21	Electrotherm (India) Ltd and Grasim Industries	Bhaskarpara, Chhattisgarh	Deallocate	The block was allocated on 21 November 2008	

The coal ministry on Thursday decided to de-allocate 11 captive coal blocks including three mines of Jindal Steel and Power, besides forfeiting the bank guarantees of six firms and asking five to expressly furnish bank guarantees. The ministry has been facing intense flak over alleged irregularities in allocation of coal blocks since 1993 and the Central Bureau of Investigation (CBI) is currently investigating the abnormalities and criminal conspiracy in their allotment. The agency has filed 14 FIRs and two preliminary enquiries so far in this connection. In this backdrop, an inter-ministerial group (IMG) of the coal ministry met on 24 October to consider the fate of 30 coal blocks, including those being investigated by the CBI. Of the mines recommended for de-allocation, two blocks – Amarkonda Murgadangal and Ramchandi Promotional (coal-to-liquid mine) belongs to Naveen Jindal-promoted JSPL and the Urtan North block also allocated to JSPL along with Monnet ISPAT & Energy . All allottees had been issued show-cause notices and were asked to furnish their views to the IMG. The decisions have been taken after careful consideration, a top coal ministry official told The Indian Express. Coal minister Sriprakash Jaiswal is learnt to have approved the recommendations of the IMG. Another coal-to-liquid block – North of Akrapal allocated to the Strategic Energy tech System Limited, which is a joint venture between the Tata group and South African firm Sasol has also been de-allocated. The Radhikapur (West) block allocated jointly to Rungta Mines, OCL India and Ocean ISPAT, Bikram mine allotted to Birla Corporation, Khappa and Extension block allocated to Sunflag Iron and Steel and Dalmia Cement have been cancelled. The ministry has decided to de-allocate the Rajgamar Dipside (South of Pulakdih Nala) coal block jointly allotted to Monnet ISPAT and Energy Ltd among others. With the fresh round of de-allocation, the total number of blocks cancelled stands at 51 as the government had earlier de-allocated 40 blocks. The ministry is preparing to inform the companies impacted by the decision. As per the IMG's recommendations steel maker SAIL is among the five companies to lose bank guarantees for delay in developing allotted blocks. Other firms include Abhijeet Infrastructure, Andhra Pradesh Mineral Development Corporation, Tenughat Vidyut Nigam and Chaman Metaliks. DE-ALLOCATED BLOCKS - COMPANIES COAL BLOCKS STATE Jindal Steel and Power Amarkonda Murgadangal Jharkhand, Jindal Steel and Power Ramchandi Promotional Block(CTL) Orissa .Jindal Steel and Power & Urtan North Madhya Pradesh, Monnet ISPAT and Energy .Rungta Mines, OCL India Radhikapur (West) Orissa and Ocean ISPAT, Strategic Energy tech System North of Akrapal (CTL) Orissa Ltd (A Tata-Sasol JV company), Birla Corporation Bikram Madhya Pradesh .Sunflag Iron and Steel Khappa & Extension Maharashtra & Dalmia Cement Monnet ISPAT and Energy Rajagamar Dipside Chhattisgarh & Shri Virangana Steels Ltd, Rathi Udyog Limited Kesla North Chhattisgarh, Castron Brahmdiha Jharkhand, Maharashtra State Mining Corp Warora Maharashtra .

Meanwhile, Jindal Steel and Power Ltd (JSPL) intends to appeal in court against the government decision to de-allocate the coal block allocated to it, a company source said.

A JSPL spokesperson earlier said the company sees "no reason" behind the de-allocation as environment clearance for the coal block in Chhattisgarh was given on Feb 10.

Sources in the Coal Ministry said the IMG has sent a note to the Ministry recommending de-allocation of 11 coal blocks of companies including JSPL, Monnet ISPAT and Energy Ltd and either imposition or deduction of bank guarantee in another 19 cases. A large of allottees of these blocks were issued show cause notices by the IMG to show why they had failed to take the required action to develop these blocks and why action should not be taken against them. Following this, the Coal Ministry had asked the owners of these blocks to make a presentation before the IMG on achievement of milestones and reasons for delays. Those who were asked to make a presentation before the IMG included state-owned Steel Authority of India (SAIL), NTPC Ltd, JSPL, Abhijeet Infrastructure, Birla Corp and Rathi Udyog, Tata Power and Monnet ISPAT and Energy Ltd. JSPL was specifically asked to make a presentation with regard to delay in production from its four coal blocks - Amarkunda Murgadangal in Jharkhand, Utkal B1 and Ramchandi in Odisha and Urtan North in Madhya Pradesh. Similarly, SAIL was asked to make presentation for Sitanala mine in Jharkhand and NTPC for Parki Barwadih mine in Jharkhand and Talaipalli mine in Chhattisgarh. During the presentation, a number of companies pointed to the continued unending delays in land acquisition, getting environmental clearances and regulatory hurdles for delays in development of the mines. The government had formed the IMG last year to review the progress of coal blocks allocated to firms for captive use and recommend action, including de-allocation. The panel has members from other Ministries including Steel and Power. The Supreme Court is monitoring the Coalgate scam probe into coal block allocations since 1993 being conducted by CBI following three public interest litigation petitions alleging that rules were flouted in giving away the natural resources and favouring certain companies at a huge loss of crores to the national exchequer. Slamming the decision to de-allocate their coal blocks, Jindal Steel and Power and Monnet ISPAT and Energy have blamed lack of government approvals and external factors like Naxal activities for not making enough progress in their mines. The two companies, whose 4 blocks figure in the list of 11 to be de-allocated, said that they are being punished for no fault of theirs. The de-allocation is seen as a major setback to both as the blocks were supposed to be the captive raw material source for their upcoming/existing steel and power plants. Jindal's Rs. 80,000-crore mega venture of Coal-to-Liquid project is likely to be hit. The two companies have together invested over 110 billion so far on development of their end-use plants. At the outset, we are shocked and surprised to hear the recommendation made by IMG (Inter-ministerial group), it seems that everybody in the policy making/monitoring wants to avoid a pragmatic decision in view of the media hype," Monnet ISPAT spokesperson said in a statement. The JSPL spokesperson said the company's coal blocks are being de-allocated "despite best efforts made by the company and no fault on part of the company." Last week, the Coal Ministry decided to de-allocate 11 captive coal blocks to various companies. JSPL's three – Ramchandi promotional block, Amarkonda Murgadangal and Urtan North (jointly with Monnet) — figure in the list. Monnet's one more block, Rajagamar Dipside (South of Pulakdih Nala) coal block jointly allotted to Monnet ISPAT and Energy Ltd among others, is also part of the list. The Monnet spokesperson further said 450 hectares of the block, out of total 650 hectares, is over-lapping with a block of the South Eastern Coalfields Ltd (SECL) and SECL needs to surrender title of the land and transfer it to Monnet. He also accused the Coal Ministry of violating its own conditions (clause 17 of General Condition of Allocation), saying that the clause "clearly stipulates that any delay in transferring the land by a government company to the coal block allocatee can be claimed as grace period." "If IMG has recommended for de-allocation, then they are violating the published guidelines of MOC," the spokesperson said, adding that Monnet can start development of the block immediately as it needs "to acquire only 5 acre of land for making an entry." According to the JSPL spokesperson, the company has made 4 attempts for carrying out exploration at Amarkonda Murgadangal block since April, 2009 but could not do it due to "large amount of extremist/Naxal activities" and "illegal mining" supported by extremists/anti-social elements. "State government had further agreed to extend the validity of PL (prospective license) by 2 years 4 months and 8 days under force majeure conditions on 5 June 2013 and we are in the process of starting our fifth attempt to carry out drilling operations in this block," he said. The spokesperson of Jindal Steel and Power (JSPL) said its employees, officials and contractors were assaulted or made hostage many times at the site and equipment were damaged. He added that many complaints and FIRs have been filed on these issues and state and central governments have been informed about it. Talking about the to be de-allocated Ramchandi promotional block, he said JSPL's application for prospecting license is pending with Odisha government for more than three years and the state government has not yet "executed PL on one pretext or the other in spite of a number of reminders." "In the circumstances, company could not start exploration activities for no fault of the company," he said, while noting that the company has already completed various initial work, including detailed feasibility study, for the project and has invested Rs. 740 million on it. The Ramchandi block, which has estimated 1.5 billion tons of coal reserves, was allocated for ambitious Coal-to-Liquid project in February, 2009 and JSPL had already announced investment Rs. 800 billion on the venture. On Urtan North block, the third to be de-allocated block (jointly allocated with Monnet), JSPL spokesperson said that its Mine Plan is pending for final approval from Coal Ministry for more than six months now. The delay in Coal Ministry's approval has led to further delay in securing Environment Clearance (EC) as well. "Expert Appraisal Committee (EAC) of MOEF, GoI has already considered grant of EC and is mainly pending for submission of Mine Plan approval letter. The Mine Plan approval letter is pending for issuance with Ministry of Coal for more than six months," the company said. Monnet, which is also a partner in the block, also echoed the same. It the spokesperson said that grant of EC is in the "final stage" and the company is hopeful that it will be cleared by EAC in their "forthcoming meeting" to be held later this month. For Monnet, Urtan North and Rajagamar Dipside blocks are supposed to be the captive raw material source for its over a million tone steel plant in Chhattisgarh's Raigarh, which is now in final stages of commissioning. The company said it has invested over Rs. 60 billion to develop the end-use plant. The Urtan North block is also critical to JSPL's plans as it was supposed to meet 10-12 per cent of the coking coal needs of its already operational Raigarh steel plant in Chhattisgarh. The company said has invested Rs. 34.16 billion on its development.

== August 2012. Coalgate reaches Parliament: the Final Report and Manmohan Singh's rebuttal in Parliament ==
=== The CAG Final Report ===
==== Overview ====
On 17 August the CAG submitted its Final Report to Parliament. Much less detailed than the Draft Report, the Final Report still made the same charges against the government:

- The Government had the authority to auction the coal blocks but chose not to.
- As a result allocatees received a "windfall gain" from the program.

The Final Report had the following outline:

- Preface (pp. i–ii).
- Executive Summary (pp. iii–viii)
- Chapter 1. Coal—An Overview (pp. 1–6)
- Chapter 2. Audit Framework (pp. 7–8)
- Chapter 3. Augmentation of Coal Production (pp. 9–20)
- Chapter 4. Allocation of Captive Coal Blocks (pp. 21–32)
- Chapter 5. Productive Performance of Captive Coal Blocks (pp. 33–42)
- Chapter 6. Conclusion and Recommendation (pp. 43–45)

==== First CAG charge: the Government had the legal authority to auction coal blocks ====
In Chapter 4 of the Final Report, the CAG continued its contention that the Government had the legal authority under the existing statute to auction coal by making an administrative decision, rather than needing to amend the statute itself. Pages 22–27 chronicle key correspondence between the Secretary (Coal), the Minister of State (Coal), the prime minister's Office, and the Department of Legal Affairs from 2004 to 2012. From this record, the CAG draws the following conclusions:

- The Government decided to bring transparency and objectivity in the allocation process of coal blocks, with 28 June 2004 taken as the cutoff date.
- The DLA advice of July 2006 was sufficient grounds upon which to introduce competitive bidding, by means of an administrative decision.
- Despite this DLA advice, there was prolonged legal examination as to whether an administrative decision or amendment of the statute was necessary for competitive bidding to be introduced. This stalled the decision making process through 2009.
- In the period between July 2006 and the end of 2009, 38 coal blocks were allocated under the existing process of allocation, "which lacked transparency, objectivity, and competition."

==== Second CAG charge: "windfall gains to the allocatees were ₹1,856 billion (US$20 billion) ====
The biggest change from the Draft Report was the dramatic reduction in the windfall gains from ₹10,673 billion (US$110 billion) to ₹1,856 billion (US$20 billion) This change is due to:

- windfall gain/ton decreased 8% from ₹322 (US$3.40) in the Draft Report to ₹295 (US$3.20) in the Final Report
- number of tons decreased 81% from 33.169 to 6.283 billion metric tons of coal. This is because the Final Report considers "extractable coal" (i.e. coal that could actually be used in production) as against the Draft Report, which considered coal in situ (i.e. coal in the ground without taking into account losses that occur during mining and washing the coal).

Particulars	Extractable reserves of OC	Average CIL sale price/tonne	Average CIL cost price/tonne	Financing cost/tonne	Net benefit/ton	Net benefit
OC Mines	3,970	1,028	583	150	295	117,275
Mixed Mines, mine plan avail	1,011	1,028	583	150	295	29,853
Mixed Mines, mine plan unavail	1,302	1,028	583	150	295	38,463
Total	6,283	1,028	583	150	295	185,591

Source: CAG Final Report, p. 31.

These are large coal volumes compared to India's annual production and represent many decades of the actual coal needs of the captive firms. The headline number of ₹1,856 billion (US$20 billion) is the gain that would accrue to captive firms over these decades, and there is no attempt to derive a Present value of the gain. However, considering inflation rate equalling discount rate, the gain calculated reflects the nearly accurate value.

=== Manmohan Singh's Rebuttal in Parliament ===
==== Overview ====
West Bengal, Chhattisgarh, Jharkhand, Orissa and Rajasthan that were ruled by opposition parties, were strongly opposed to a switch over to the process of competitive bidding as they felt that it would increase the cost of coal, adversely impact value addition and development of industries in their areas and would dilute their prerogative in the selection of lessees.

The CAG, Singh argued, had simply ignored the practical realities of policy implementation in their accusation that the Government did not move fast enough in transitioning to competitive bidding.

==== First CAG charge: the Government had the legal authority to auction coal blocks ====
Singh addresses the question of legal authority in paragraphs 14–18 of his Parliamentary statement:

14. The CAG says that competitive bidding could have been introduced in 2006 by amending the existing administrative instructions. This premise of the CAG is flawed.

15. The observation of the CAG that the process of competitive bidding could have been introduced by amending the administrative instructions is based on the opinion expressed by the Department of Legal Affairs in July and August 2006. However, the CAG's observation is based on a selective reading of the opinions given by the Department of Legal Affairs.

16. Initially, the Government had initiated a proposal to introduce competitive bidding by formulating appropriate rules. This matter was referred to the Department of Legal Affairs, which initially opined that amendment to the Coal Mines Act would be necessary for this purpose.

17. A meeting was convened in the PMO on 25 July 2005 which was attended by representatives of coal and lignite bearing states. In the meeting the representatives of state governments were opposed to the proposed switch over to competitive bidding. It was further noted that the legislative changes that would be required for the proposed change would require considerable time and the process of allocation of coal blocks for captive mining could not be kept in abeyance for so long given the pressing demand for coal. Therefore, it was decided in this meeting to continue with the allocation of coal blocks through the extant Screening Committee procedure till the new competitive bidding procedure became operational. This was a collective decision of the Centre and the state governments concerned.

18. It was only in August 2006 that the Department of Legal Affairs opined that competitive bidding could be introduced through administrative instructions. However, the same Department also opined that legislative amendments would be required for placing the proposed process on a sound legal footing. In a meeting held in September, 2006, Secretary, Department of Legal Affairs categorically opined that having regard to the nature and scope of the relevant legislation, it would be most appropriate to achieve the objective through amendment to the Mines & Minerals (Development & Regulation) Act.

==== Second CAG charge: "windfall gain to the allocatees were ₹1,856 billion (US$20 billion) ====
26. Let me humbly submit that, even if we accept CAG's contention that benefits accrued to private companies, their computations can be questioned on a number of technical points. The CAG has computed financial gains to private parties as being the difference between the average sale price and the production cost of CIL of the estimated extractable reserves of the allocated coal blocks.

- Firstly, computation of extractable reserves based on averages would not be correct.
- Secondly, the cost of production of coal varies significantly from mine to mine even for CIL due to varying geo-mining conditions, method of extraction, surface features, number of settlements, availability of infrastructure etc.
- Thirdly, CIL has been generally mining coal in areas with better infrastructure and more favourable mining conditions, whereas the coal blocks offered for captive mining are generally located in areas with more difficult geological conditions.
- Fourthly, a part of the gains would in any case get appropriated by the government through taxation and under the MMDR Bill, presently being considered by the parliament, 26% of the profits earned on coal mining operations would have to be made available for local area development.

Therefore, aggregating the purported financial gains to private parties merely on the basis of the average production costs and sale price of CIL could be highly misleading. Moreover, as the coal blocks were allocated to private companies only for captive purposes for specified end-uses, it would not be appropriate to link the allocated blocks to the price of coal set by CIL.

== September 2012. Coalgate reaches Supreme Court of India ==
You may have well laid down policy but was it implemented? Is it a sheer coincidence that a large number of beneficiaries were either politicians or their relatives or associates?

— Justice R M Lodha and Justice A R Dave, Supreme Court of India

Advocate M L Sharma filed a Public Interest Litigation (PIL) in the Supreme Court seeking to cancel the allotment of 194 coal blocks on grounds of arbitrariness, illegality, unconstitutionality and public interest. Defending the CAG, a Supreme Court bench of Justices R M Lodha and A R Dave dismissed the Solicitor General Rohinton Nariman's objections that petition relies heavily on the CAG report by saying the CAG is a "constitutional authority" and that its report is "not a piece of trash".

Moreover, the court ordered the government to inform it of reasons for not following the 2004 policy of "competitive bidding" for coal block allocation. The apex court wanted to know not only the steps that have been taken but also proposed against companies that have breached the agreement. On 13 March 2013 Supreme Court bench responded to rare display of divergence between center and premier investigation agency CBI by asking its director not to share details of coal block scam investigations with political executives and report only to the court. It further ordered the CBI director to file an affidavit by 26 April stating that probe status report filed before it had been vetted by him and its contents were not shared with the political masters and "the same arrangement shall follow in future".

Two applications were filed by NGO Common Cause (India) and Manohar Lal Sharma on 13 April 2013.Activist lawyer Prashant Bhushan, sought creation of a special investigation team to probe the case as it involved "very powerful personalities in the present government who were either in charge of the allocation process or who influenced the process to get allocation to their favoured entities ."There has been mounting evidence... for the last one year as to how major corporate groups like Jindals were able to garner huge blocks with millions of tons of coal, as was the case with shady companies linked with other politicians. Despite that CBI has neither filed any chargesheet nor made an arrest ."The application said.. The Naveen Jindal Group had allegedly "misrepresented" facts and was shown favour by the Jharkhand Government which dropped other firms from its recommendation for allocation of coal blocks in the state in 2007, the CBI has said in its FIR filed before a court here in Coalgate. The FIR is categorical that Ministry of Power was against the proposal for allocating Amarkonda Murgadangal coal block to Jindal Group firms—Jindal Steel and Power Ltd (JSPL) and Gagan Sponge Iron Pvt Ltd (GSIPL) -- which have been named as accused along with Congress MP Naveen Jindal. However, former Minister of State for Coal Dasari Narayan Rao, also an accused in the FIR, had written a note to the then Coal Secretary and showed "undue favour" to Jindal's firm which had misrepresented the facts regarding its "preparedness in setting up their proposed end used plant (EUP)". "Enquiry further revealed that Government of Jharkhand vide its letter dated 20 June 2007 recommended the allocation of Amarkonda Murgadangal coal block to three companies namely (1) M/s Lanco Infratech Ltd (40 per cent), (2) M/s JSPL (30 per cent) and (3) M/s GSIPL (30 per cent). "However vide its letter dated 30 July 2007, Government of Jharkhand changed its recommendation and recommended the allocation of Amarkonda Murgadangal block to only the two Naveen Jindal Group companies i.e. JSPL (70 per cent) and M/s GSIPL (30 per cent)," the CBI said in its 12th FIR filed till date in the coal blocks allocation scam before the Special CBI Court. The agency alleged that both SPL and GSIPL misrepresented the facts to the Coal Ministry but the Screening Committee, which used to recommend for allocation of coal blocks to the shortlisted applicant companies, in its meeting held on 13 September 2007, had recommended allocation of Amarkonda Murgadangal coal block jointly to these two firms. "Enquiry further revealed that both M/s JSPL and M/s GSIPL misrepresented in its application/feed back form on the count of their preparedness in setting up their proposed EUP as well the previous allocation of coal blocks to their group companies," it said. The FIR further said, "Despite not being recommended by the Ministry of Power and the companies having misrepresented on the aforesaid counts, the Screening Committee in its meeting held on 13 September 2007 recommended the allocation of Amarkonda Murgadangal coal block jointly to M/s JSPL and M's GSIPL."The CBI said that Power Ministry had not recommended allocation of coal blocks either to JSPL or GSIPL as they did not "meet the criteria of preparation adopted by Central Electricity Authority which shortlisted the companies on behalf of Ministry of Power." Regarding Rao, the agency said that in order to influence the decision of the Screening Committee in favour of JSPL and GSIPL, the then Minister of State for Coal had written a note on 27 July 2007 to the Coal Secretary, who was also Chairman of the Screening Committee.Referring to the note, CBI said, "He (Rao) mentioned that he had come to know through the media reports that Ministry of Power/CEA had been appraising various applications received in the Ministry of Coal on the criteria of net worth of applicant, progress regarding land acquisition and water tie up etc.""However, the Screening Committee should evaluate various applicants as per the past practicesIt said on a representation by another firm Bhushan Energy Ltd (BEL) seeking 50 per cent share in Amarkonda Murgadangal coal block, Rao "again showed undue favour" to Jindal's firms and justified the decision of Screening Committee recommending the allocation of coal blocks to the two companies. It said that JSPL had submitted its application for coal block allocation in January 2007 to the Coal Ministry for securing few blocks earmarked for power sector, including Amarkonda Murgadangal coal block in Jharkhand for its proposed 1000 MW captive power plant to be set up at Patratu.GSIPL also submitted its application dated 10 January 2007 to the ministry for its 1000 MW independent power plant in Dumka district in Jharkhand, the CBI said, adding that the allocation letter was issued to the two firms on 17 January 2008. Besides Jindal, Rao, JSPL and GSIPL, the accused named in the FIR, lodged under provisions of the IPC dealing with the offence of conspiracy to cheat and under the relevant sections of the Prevention of Corruption Act, are—members of the 35th Screening Committee, Jindal Realty Pvt Ltd, New Delhi Exim Pvt Ltd, Sowbhagya Media Ltd, Directors of GSIPL and other unknown persons.

== 2013 ==
=== Role of Prime Minister Manmohan Singh ===
In 2004, coal secretary P C Parakh informed PM the potential fraud inherent in the discretionary allocation of the captive coal fields and objected to it in writing. Still all the 142 coal blocks were allocated without auction during the Prime Minister's tenure in the coal ministry. BJP on 19 April demanded the resignation of Prime Minister Manmohan Singh alleging that he was using the law ministry to save himself from the probe. The Supreme Court observations on 30 April are undoubtedly harsh. No other government in India has been criticized in such words. The legalities of the case have proved troublesome for Manmohan Singh and the UPA. P C Parakh who is considered the whistleblower for the Coalgate said that he clearly pushed for auctions, but was overruled by the PM.

=== Parliamentary Standing Committee Report ===
Standing Committee on Coal and Steel tabled in Parliament on 23 April 2013 stated in its latest report that all coal blocks distributed between 1993 and 2008 were done in an unauthorized manner and allotment of all the mines where production is yet to start should be cancelled. It recommended that all "personnel" who have been involved "directly or indirectly" in the allocation process "should be investigated for their role". There was no transparency in the allocation process and the exchequer did not get any revenue from allocation of the blocks. It has pointed out that the allocations between 1993 and 2004 were done without any advertisement or public information. It accused both the UPA and NDA for perpetrating massive corruption.

=== Supreme court hearing ===
On 26 April the CBI director Ranjit Sinha submitted an affidavit in the Supreme Court stating that the coal scam status report prepared by the investigating agency was shared with the law minister Ashwani Kumar "as desired by him", joint secretary-level officers from the Prime Minister's Office (PMO) and the coal ministry before presenting it to the court on 8 March It contradicts the claim made by CBI counsel in SC that the coal scam report was not shared with any member of the government. On 29 April, CBI stated to SC that 20% if its original report was changed by Government. Additional Solicitor-General Harin Raval resigned for having misled the Supreme Court.

Ranjit Sinha said SC that CBI is part of government and hence not autonomous. The three-judge Bench of Justices R.M. Lodha, Madan B. Lokur and Kurian Joseph directed the CBI to file an affidavit by 6 May regarding the changes that were made in the status report, at whose instance the changes were made, and the effect of these changes on the entire investigation. Counsel Prashant Bhushan said there were efforts to shield PM. He said "the Central Vigilance Commission can at least be asked to direct the CBI to show the final report. If the CVC feels there are a few things left out and if there are things not done then it can ask the CBI to change the Investigating officer. The reason why the CVC can interfere is because of this administrative control. The CBI Director who has statutory status can be pressurize by promising post retirement jobs etc. Thus government manage to control the CBI." Adv Prashant Bhushan said "companies are trying to operationalise and then they can say so much investment is being done. Every delay will lend them the contention of equity."

He requested court to appoint a retired judge and police officer of impeccable integrity to overlook the investigation.SC said that it will liberate CBI from political interference to make CBI credible, impartial and independent. on 24 September 2014 Supreme Court quashed allocation of 214 out of 218 coal blocks which were allotted to various companies since 1993 and in which it was claimed that around Rs 2 lakh crores were invested.

== 2014 ==
=== Special CBI Court ===
In July 2014, Supreme Court of India decided to set up a special CBI court to try cases arising from coal block allocation scam. It also appointed Rajinder Singh Cheema (Ex. Advocate General, Punjab) as the special public prosecutor and Justice Bharat Parashar as the judge of the special court that will hear the case on a day-to-day basis. The court also directed that all the matters pending in different court relating to coal blocks allocation scam would stand transferred to the special court.

=== Supreme Court verdict ===
On 24 September, the Supreme Court of India decided to cancel 214 out of 218 coal blocks allocated since 1993. Apart from the cancellation, operational mines will have to pay a penalty of Rs. 295 for every tone of coal extracted since they started.

== 2015 ==
=== Summons issued and then stayed to Manmohan Singh and others ===
On 11 March 2015, Special CBI judge took cognizance of the offence under Sections 120-B and 409 of Indian Penal Code, 1860 and Sections 13(1)(c), 13(1)(d)(iii) of Prevention of Corruption Act, 1988 against Dr. Manmohan Singh and five other accused namely M/s. HINDALCO, Subendhu Amitabh, D. Bhattacharya, Kumar Mangalam Birla, P.C. Parakh. It further took cognisance of substantive offences under Sections 409 of IPC and Sections 13(1)(c) and 13(1)(d)(iii) of Prevention of Corruption Act, 1988 against Singh and Parakh. Court then issued summons to the six accused. Singh and Parakh then approached the Supreme Court which on 1 April 2015 granted an interim stay against the order and stayed further proceedings against them before the special CBI Court.

== 2026 ==
=== Closure and clean chit to Manmohan Singh ===
On 29 July 2026, the Supreme Court closed the coal block allocation case against former PM Manmohan Singh. The SC accepted the two closure reports filed by the Central Bureau of Investigation in 2014 which gave the former PM a clean chit, and highlighted that there was no "sufficient material or good reason" to register a corruption case.

== Missing files ==
Coal Allocation (I & II) sections are responsible for maintaining all records pertaining to allocation of coal blocks. The number of missing files was initially pegged at 157 – the number of applications for coal blocks allocation .Nearly 150 are related to the period between 1993 and 2004 in which 45 coal blocks were allocated. Missing files benefit three sets of people– the beneficiary companies (and individuals) who received coal block allocations; the screening committee (based on its deliberations) and the minister and his office (bureaucrats and officials). The BJP says that the bulk of the questionable allocations took place while PM Manmohan Singh held charge of the coal ministry.

== People in office during the allocations ==
- TKA Nair, Former Principal Secy, PM and now Adviser to PM
- DC Garg (Chief, Western Coalfields Ltd) under CBI scanner

=== Ministers ===
Sriprakash Jaiswal (incumbent since 2012) Manmohan Singh (PM) (four months in 2004 and from 2007 to 2012)

- UPA-I coal minister – Sibu Soren, May 2004 to 2007, except 24 July – 27 November 2004

2003 – Ministry of coal separated from ministry of mines

=== Ministers of mines ===
- Mamata Banerjee (January 2004 – May 2004) AITC
- Ram Vilas Paswan (September 2001 – April 2002) LJP
- Syed Shanawaz Hussain (2001 minister of coal) BJP
- Sunder Lal Patwa (2000-2001) BJP
- Naveen Patnaik (minister of mines – 1998 – 2000) BJD

== See also ==
- Comptroller and Auditor General of India (CAG)
- Vinod Rai, the CAG whose report triggered the whole 'Coalgate scam' controversy.
- Coal mining in India

=== Other scams and corruption ===
- 1992 Indian stock market scam
- NSE co-location scam
- Mining scam in India
- 2G spectrum case, a scam which came into limelight after CAG headed by Vinod Rai submitted report projecting loss of 1760 billion.
- Saradha Chit Fund Scam
- Uttar Pradesh NRHM scam
- Concerns and controversies over the 2010 Commonwealth Games
- List of scandals in India
- Corruption in India
- Licence Raj
- Mafia Raj
- Rent seeking

=== Anti-corruption efforts ===
- 2011 Indian anti-corruption movement
- Jan Lokpal Bill
- Right to Public Services legislation
- United Nations Convention against Corruption
