= List of deaths from legal euthanasia and assisted suicide =

Euthanasia is the practice of intentionally ending a life in order to relieve pain and suffering, while assisted suicide, also known as physician-assisted suicide, is suicide committed with the aid of a physician. Assisted suicide is often confused with euthanasia. In cases of euthanasia the physician administers the means of death, usually a lethal drug. In assisted suicide, it is required that the person voluntarily expresses their wish to die, and also makes a request for medication for the purpose of ending their life. Assisted suicide thus involves a person’s self-administration of deadly drugs that are supplied by a doctor. The legality of euthanasia and assisted suicide varies. Involuntary euthanasia is illegal in all countries. Active non-voluntary euthanasia (patient's consent unavailable) is illegal in all countries, though in the Netherlands the Groningen Protocol allows exemptions from prosecution in strict circumstances. Passive non-voluntary euthanasia (withholding life support) is either legal or not legislated in most countries.

Voluntary euthanasia is legal in Belgium, Canada, Colombia, Ecuador, Luxembourg, the Netherlands, New Zealand, Portugal and Spain. It is also legal in all states and territories of Australia except the Northern Territory (where it was briefly legal from 1996–1997), and in the United States jurisdictions of California, Colorado, Hawaii, Maine, Montana, New Jersey, Oregon, Vermont, Washington State and Washington DC. Assisted suicide is legal in Austria, Belgium, Canada, Luxembourg, the Netherlands, New Zealand, Spain and Switzerland.

This list contains notable people who have died via either legal voluntary euthanasia or assisted suicide. The criterion for notability is an article on the individual in the English Wikipedia.

Name	Born	Died	Nationality	Place of death	Profession	Ref.
Dries van Agt	1931	2024	Dutch	Netherlands	Politician, diplomat and head of government	
Constance Ahrons	1937	2021	American	United States	Psychotherapist	
René Auberjonois	1940	2019	American	United States	Actor and director	
Zoraya ter Beek	1995	2024	Dutch	Netherlands		
Denis Berthiaume	1969	2022	Canadian	Canada	Academic and researcher	
Arthur Black	1943	2018	Canadian	Canada	Broadcaster and author	
Edward Brongersma	1911	1998	Dutch	Netherlands	Politician	
Noelia Castillo	2000	2026	Spanish	Spain	Activist	
Michèle Causse	1936	2010	French	Switzerland	Theorist, translator and author	
Antonio Cicero	1945	2024	Brazilian	Switzerland	Composer and poet	
Hugo Claus	1929	2008	Belgian	Belgium	Author	
Barbara Dane	1927	2024	American	United States	Musician	
Reinhilde Decleir	1948	2022	Belgian	Belgium	Actress and director	
Christian de Duve	1917	2013	Belgian	Belgium	Cytologist and biochemist	
Arnaud Denis	1983	2026	French	Belgium	Actor and stage director	
Fleur van Dooren	1989	2024	Dutch	Netherlands	Field hockey player	
Edward Downes	1924	2009	English	Switzerland	Conductor	
Ana Estrada	1976	2024	Peruvian	Peru (Note: While euthanasia is illegal in Peru, an exception was made for Estrada in 2022.)	Psychologist	
Mike Farnan	1941	2023	Canadian	Canada	Politician	
Jackie Ferrara	1929	2025	American	Switzerland	Sculptor	
Anton Fier	1956	2022	American	Switzerland	Drummer, composer and bandleader	
Iain Finlay	1935	2025	Australian	Australia	Author and journalist	
Mark Fleischman	1940	2022	American	Switzerland	Businessman	
Fu Da-ren	1933	2018	Taiwanese	Switzerland	Television presenter	
Herbert Fux	1927	2007	Austrian	Switzerland	Actor and politician	
Jean-Guy Gendron	1934	2022	Canadian	Canada	Ice hockey player	
Jean-Luc Godard	1930	2022	French-Swiss	Switzerland	Film director, screenwriter and film critic	
David Goodall	1914	2018	Australian	Switzerland	Botanist and ecologist	
Paulette Guinchard-Kunstler	1949	2021	French	Switzerland	Politician	
Frans Jozef van der Heijden	1938	2016	Dutch	Netherlands	Politician	
Margriet Hermans	1954	2026	Belgian	Belgium	Singer and politician	
John Hicklenton	1967	2010	British	Switzerland	Comics artist	
Leo Hindery	1947	2025	American	Switzerland	Businessman	
Pieter Hintjens	1962	2016	Belgian	Belgium	Software developer	
Wim Jansen	1946	2022	Dutch	Netherlands	Football player and manager	
Willem Jewett	1963	2022	American	United States	Politician	
Daniel Kahneman	1934	2024	Israeli-American	Switzerland	Psychologist and nobel laureate	
Alice Kessler	1936	2025	German	Germany	Entertainer	
Ellen Kessler	1936	2025	German	Germany	Entertainer	
W. P. Kinsella	1935	2016	Canadian	Canada	Writer	
Friedhelm Konietzka	1938	2012	German	Switzerland	Football striker and manager	
Andrée Lachapelle	1931	2019	Canadian	Canada	Actress	
Richard Laviolette	1982	2023	Canadian	Canada	Musician	
Michael Lerner	1943	2024	American	United States	Rabbi, political activist	
Ruud Lubbers	1939	2018	Dutch	Netherlands	Politician, diplomat and head of government	
Margaret Lyons	1923	2019	Canadian	Canada	Radio executive	
Heather MacAllister	1968	2007	American	United States	Burlesque performer and activist	
Lucio Magri	1932	2011	Italian	Switzerland	Journalist and politician	
Pierre Mailloux	1949	2024	Canadian	Canada	Psychiatrist, talk show host	
Wilfried Martens	1936	2013	Belgian	Belgium	Politician, jurist and head of government	
Brittany Maynard	1984	2014	American	United States	Teacher	
John McDermid	1940	2024	Canadian	Canada	Politician	
Ludwig Minelli	1932	2025	Swiss	Switzerland	Lawyer and journalist	
Caíseal Mór	1961	2023	Australian	Australia	Writer, musician, artist and actor	
Chaïm Nissim	1949	2017	Israeli	Switzerland	Activist, militant and politician	
Willem Oltmans	1925	2004	Dutch	Netherlands	Journalist and author	
Roeland Raes	1934	2024	Belgian	Belgium	Politician	
Mort Ransen	1933	2021	Canadian	Canada	Director and screenwriter	
Elisabeth Rivers-Bulkeley	1924	2006	Austrian	Switzerland	Stockbroker	
Matthijs Röling	1943	2024	Dutch	Netherlands	Painter	
Betty Rollin	1936	2023	American	Switzerland	Journalist and author	
Pete Sutherland	1951	2022	American	United States	Folk musician	
Adi Talmor	1953	2011	Israeli	Switzerland	Journalist and news presenter	
Bea Van der Maat	1960	2023	Belgian	Belgium	Singer	
Etienne Vermeersch	1934	2019	Belgian	Belgium	Philosopher	
Marieke Vervoort	1979	2019	Belgian	Belgium	Paralympic athlete	
Norah Vincent	1968	2022	American	Switzerland	Writer and journalist	
Pamela Weston	1921	2009	English	Switzerland	Clarinetist, teacher and writer	
Rogi Wieg	1962	2015	Dutch	Netherlands	Poet, novelist and musician	
Jack Willis	1934	2022	American	Switzerland	Filmmaker	
Mike Wood	1952	2025	American	Switzerland	Businessman, lawyer	
