= Euthanasia for mental illness =

Euthanasia for mental illness involves a physician intentionally ending the life of a patient who has requested euthanasia due to a psychiatric condition. The practice is legal in Belgium, the Netherlands, Luxembourg, Spain and Colombia. In Canada, legislation authorizing the procedure was passed, but has since been repeatedly postponed.

The practice is considered controversial as unlike with other types of euthanasia, a patient euthanized for mental illness alone is usually not terminally ill, and may have their decisional capacity impeded by their condition. It is also considered more difficult with psychological conditions to determine an objective prognosis, or whether a disorder is irremediable.

== By country ==
=== Belgium ===
In Belgium, euthanasia for mental illness is legal if the patient is mentally competent to make the decision; the patient requests euthanasia on two separate occasions in writing; the patient is suffering from an incurable disease or mental illness, and all treatment options have been exhausted; and the patient is experiencing "unbearable suffering" from the illness, either physically or psychologically. Three doctors must agree to grant euthanasia in psychiatric cases. Euthanasia for mental suffering is not available for children.

As of 2017, approximately 40 patients per year received euthanasia due to mental illness, out of approximately 2,000 total yearly euthanasia deaths.

=== Netherlands ===
Euthanasia for mental illness has been legal since 2002 in the Netherlands provided the patient has "unbearable suffering with no prospect of improvement" and has requested to die in a way that is "voluntary, well considered and with full conviction", among other criteria. In 2020, the Supreme Court of the Netherlands ruled that physicians could euthanize patients with dementia if they had expressed a wish to die before the onset of their condition.

In 2023, 138 people in the Netherlands received euthanasia due to psychiatric conditions, a 20% increase from 2022. The first minor euthanized for a psychiatric condition (who was between 16 and 18-years-old) was in 2023.

== Notable cases ==
The 2016 euthanasia of Eelco de Gooijer, a 38-year-old man from Tilburg, Netherlands who had depression and autism, was one of the first high-profile euthanasia cases involving a young person with a neurodevelopmental condition and mental illness.

In 2020, a Belgian court acquitted three doctors who had euthanized Tine Nys, a physically healthy 38-year-old woman with autism, of manslaughter charges. Nys' sister Sophie Nys had filed a lawsuit alleging that the doctors did not properly attempt to treat her condition, and that Nys had not been incurably ill as the law required.

On 24 May 2024, a 29 year old Dutch woman, Zoraya ter Beek, was euthanized in the Netherlands despite being physically healthy. Ter Beek had suffered from a number of mental illnesses such as borderline personality disorder, depression, and anxiety. The case had garnered a debate across Europe about the ethics of assisted suicide and euthanasia for mentally ill patients.

In Spain, the April 2026 case of 25-year-old Noelia Castillo gained national prominence and prompted debate over existing laws. Castillo had suffered from psychiatric illness since she was a teenager and attempted suicide twice, with injuries from her second attempt leaving her wheelchair-bound. Her father pursued a public unsuccessful legal battle seeking to prevent the euthanasia.
