= Legality of euthanasia =

Current status of euthanasia around the world: Active voluntary euthanasia legal Passive euthanasia legal (refusal of treatment/withdrawal of life support) Active euthanasia illegal, passive euthanasia not legislated or regulated All forms of euthanasia illegal

Current status of euthanasia in Europe: Active voluntary euthanasia legal (Note: Portugal: Law not yet in force, awaits regulation to be implemented. The law legalizing euthanasia, Law n.º 22/2023, of 22 May, states in Article 31 that the regulation must be approved within 90 days of the publishing of the law, which would have been 23 August 2023. However, the regulation has not yet been drafted and approved by the government. On 24 November 2023, the Ministry of Health stated that the regulation of the law would be the responsibility of the new government elected in the 10 March 2024 elections. The law, according to its Article 34, will only enter into force 30 days after the regulation is published. As of 1 May 2026, the regulation has not yet been drafted and approved.) Passive euthanasia legal Active euthanasia illegal, passive euthanasia not legislated or regulated All forms of euthanasia illegal (Note: Russia: Even though declared illegal, no punishment is specified by the law except of Felony Code which punishes ordinary murders and manslaughter crimes.)

Laws regarding euthanasia vary by country and territory. Efforts to change government policies on euthanasia of humans in the 20th and 21st centuries had limited effect in Western countries. Human euthanasia policies have also been developed by a variety of NGOs, most advocacy organisations although medical associations express a range of perspectives, and supporters of palliative care broadly oppose euthanasia.

As of 2026, euthanasia is legal in Australia, Belgium, Canada, Colombia, Ecuador, France, Luxembourg, the Netherlands, New Zealand, Portugal (law not yet in force, awaiting regulation), Spain, and Uruguay. In 2021, a Peruvian court allowed euthanasia for a single person, Ana Estrada. Eligibility for euthanasia varies across jurisdictions where it is legal, with some countries allowing euthanasia for mental illness.

Euthanasia is distinct from assisted suicide, which may be legal in certain other jurisdictions.

== Timeline ==
Country	Legalization method	Date effective
Netherlands	Passed by the States General	1 April 2002
Belgium	Passed by the Belgian Federal Parliament	28 May 2002
Luxembourg	Passed by the Chamber of Deputies	19 March 2009
Colombia	Ruling of the Constitutional Court of Colombia	15 December 2014
Canada	Passed by the Parliament of Canada	17 June 2016
Spain	Passed by the Cortes Generales	25 June 2021
New Zealand	Passed by the Parliament of New Zealand and adopted in a referendum	6 November 2021
Portugal	Passed by the Assembly of the Republic, promulgated by the President and published on the official gazette. Awaiting the drafting and approval of regulation by the government.	TBA
Ecuador	Ruling of the Constitutional Court of Ecuador	5 February 2024
Uruguay	Passed by the Parliament of Uruguay on the 15 October 2025 and promulgated through a reglamentary decree signed by President Yamandú Orsi on 15 April 2026.	15 April 2026
France	Passed by the National Assembly on the 15 July 2026, promulgated the 19 August 2026.	TBA
Australia	Passed by the Northern Territory Legislative Assembly on the 27 August 2026, last place in Australia to legalize the practice.	Early 2028

== Euthanasia law by country ==
=== Americas ===
==== Argentina ====
In May 2012, the Argentine Senate (Senado Argentino), through Law 26,742, legalised a project that enables patients to reject treatments that artificially prolong the life of patients with terminal or irreversible symptoms. The consent may be given by the patient, or, if they are not in a position to do so, their relatives or legal representatives. Basically, Argentina supports passive euthanasia, but not active euthanasia.

==== Canada ====
Voluntary active euthanasia, called "physician assisted dying", is legal in Canada for all people over the age of 18 who have a terminal illness that has progressed to the point where natural death is "reasonably foreseeable." To prevent suicide tourism, only people eligible to claim Canadian health insurance may use it. Legalization of the practice came in 2015/2016 as a result of a series of Supreme Court rulings striking down Canada's ban on medically assisted suicide. Below is a timeline of events:

On 5 June 2014, Québec's provincial National Assembly unanimously adopted La Loi concernant les soins de fins de vie arguing healthcare is a provincial's competency and therefore challenging Ottawa's competency regarding the criminal code. The Supreme Court ruling, in favor of Québec, created a legal precedent for euthanasia in Canada.

On 6 February 2015, the Supreme Court of Canada unanimously ruled in Carter v Canada (AG) that Canadian adults who are mentally competent and suffering intolerably and permanently have the right to a doctor's help in dying. The court however suspended its ruling for 12 months to give the government an opportunity to write legislation and draft new laws and policies around assisted dying. In January 2016 the court granted an additional 4-month extension to its ruling suspension to allow time for the newly elected Liberal government to consult with Canadians on drafting a law to comply with the ruling. As an interim measure, it also ruled that provincial courts can now begin approving applications for euthanasia until the new law passes.

A parliamentary committee report tasked with studying the issue in light of the Supreme Court of Canada's ruling recommended that anyone experiencing "intolerable suffering" should be able to seek a doctor's help to die. On 14 April 2016, Canada's federal Liberal government introduced legislation to legalize assisted dying under more restrictive conditions than recommended by the committee, allowing access to only those with terminal illnesses for whom death is "reasonably foreseeable". The British Columbia Civil Liberties Association argues that the government's assisted dying law is unconstitutional, because it limits access to only those whose death is "reasonably foreseeable", rather than provide access to anybody suffering from a "grievous and irremediable" condition, the definition used by the Supreme Court of Canada in their court ruling that the BCCLA argues would include non-terminal conditions.

The bill received considerable multi-partisan opposition within the Senate, where it was criticized as being drafted too quickly, and being too restrictive compared with the Supreme Court decision. As a result, the Senate made a series of amendments to the bill. The House of Commons accepted all of the amendments made by the Senate except one, which removed the requirement that death be "reasonably foreseeable."

On 17 June 2016, a bill to legally allow assisted suicide within Canada became law after it passed both houses of the Parliament of Canada and received Royal Assent.

==== Chile ====
Active euthanasia or assisted suicide are not legal in Chile. Passive euthanasia, however, is legal. Since 2012, the regulation of patients' rights creates the right to informed consent, which allows accepting or refusing any medical treatment. Patients can refuse treatment when they are terminal. Currently, a bill to allow active euthanasia and assisted suicide is being discussed by the congress. The bill was approved in general by the Chamber of Deputies on 12 December 2020.

==== Colombia ====
In a 6–3 decision, Colombia's Constitutional Court ruled in 1997 that "no person can be held criminally responsible for taking the life of a terminally ill patient who has given clear authorization to do so," according to The Washington Post. The court defined "terminally ill" person as those with diseases such as "cancer, AIDS, and kidney or liver failure if they are terminal and the cause of extreme suffering," the Post reported. The ruling specifically refused to authorize euthanasia for people with degenerative diseases such as Alzheimer's, Parkinson's, or Lou Gehrig's disease. On 15 December 2014, the Constitutional Court had given the Ministry of Health and Social Protection 30 days to publish guidelines for the healthcare sector to use in order to guarantee terminally ill patients, with the wish to undergo euthanasia, their right to a dignified death. The Constitutional Court of Colombia extended in July 2021 the requirements to access and practice euthanasia to non-terminal patients.

==== Ecuador ====
On February 5, 2024, the Constitutional Court of Ecuador ruled that active euthanasia is legal. The Court decided that Article 144 of COIP (Código Orgánico Integral Penal, Comprehensive Criminal Organic Code), that typifies simple homicide, is constitutional as long as active euthanasia is not sanctioned. The Court indicated that active euthanasia will be legal when i) it is performed by a physician, ii) the patient has given free, unequivocal and informed consent (or through a representative when unable to express it), and iii) the patient is experiencing intense suffering because of a serious and irreversible bodily injury or a serious and incurable disease.

==== Mexico ====
Current status of euthanasia in Mexico: Passive euthanasia is legal Not legislated

In Mexico, active euthanasia is illegal but since 7 January 2008 the law allows the terminally ill —or closest relatives, if unconscious— to refuse medication or further medical treatment to extend life (also known as passive euthanasia) in Mexico City, in the central state of Aguascalientes (since 6 April 2009) and, since 1 September 2009, in the Western state of Michoacán. A similar law extending the same provisions at the national level has been approved by the senate and an initiative decriminalizing active euthanasia has entered the same legislative chamber on 13 April 2007.

==== Peru ====
Euthanasia is a delict under the laws of Peru, although there have been some attempts to reform them.

In October 2009, the Reviser Special Commission of the Penal Code of the Parliament expressed its support of a proposal that tried to amend article 112 of the Penal Code, but it did not succeed.

However, at the beginning of 2015, the case of the Chilean woman young Valentina Maureira, who suffered from cystic fibrosis, an incurable disease, and who asked that euthanasia be allowed in her country, attracted the interest of the press of Chile and also of foreign media.

On 4 March of the same year, the Peruvian legislator Roberto Angulo Álvarez, membership of Dignity and Democracy parliamentary group, motivated by this case, presented a bill that proposed to allow assisted death in case of terminal or degenerative disease, with the objective of "avoid the physical and psychological pains of the patient, as well the unnecessary expenses for the family members and the State". Angulo Álvarez also argued that his legislative project "would contribute to respect for individual freedom and human dignity".

==== United States ====
Active euthanasia is illegal throughout the United States. Patients retain the rights to refuse medical treatment and to receive appropriate management of pain at their request (passive euthanasia), even if the patients' choices hasten their deaths. Additionally, futile or disproportionately burdensome treatments, such as life-support machines, may be withdrawn under specified circumstances and, under federal law and most state laws only with the informed consent of the patient or, in the event of the incompetence of the patient, with the informed consent of the legal surrogate. The Supreme Court of the United States has not dealt with "quality of life issues" or "futility issues" and appears to only condone active or passive "euthanasia" (not legally defined) when there is clear and convincing evidence that informed consent to the euthanasia, passive or active, has been obtained from the competent patient or the legal surrogate of the incompetent patient.

While active euthanasia is illegal throughout the U.S., assisted suicide is legal in Colorado, Oregon, Hawaii, New Mexico, Washington, Vermont, Maine, New Jersey, California, the District of Columbia, and is de facto legal in Montana.

==== Uruguay ====
In October 2025, with the approval of the so-called Dignified Death Bill, Uruguay recognised the right of mentally sound adults in the terminal stage of an incurable and irreversible disease to request euthanasia to be administered by a doctor on their behalf, this procedure is known as active euthanasia.

Any patient who requests to be euthanized will first need to get a doctor's counsel and approval, and then that of a second doctor independent of the first one or a medical board in case of disagreement between the first two. The patient will then undergo another interview, and finally, they will have to ratify their decision before two witnesses at least one of whom shall not receive any financial benefit due to the death of the declarant.

The physician and other members of the healthcare may validly object to their services under the figure of conscientious objector. In such a case, the healthcare institution will determine who should replace them, always ensuring the provision of the service.

=== Asia and Oceania ===
==== Australia ====
All Australian states and territories have passed laws allowing voluntary assisted dying (as it is known in Australia), which allow physician-assisted suicide where a person suffers a medical condition that is advanced, incurable, irreversible, causes intolerable suffering, and will cause the person's death in the next six months, or 12 months for neurodegenerative disorders.

Victoria was the first to do so; its law, the Voluntary Assisted Dying Act 2017, came into effect in June 2019, with Western Australia passing a similar law in December 2019. The final state in Australia to pass laws allowing voluntary assisted dying was New South Wales in May 2022. Before the introduction of such laws, charges had on rare occasions been laid for aiding and abetting the suicide of others.

Voluntary assisted dying schemes have come into in the following states:

- Victoria from 19 June 2019
- Western Australia from 1 July 2021
- Tasmania from 23 October 2022
- Queensland from 1 January 2023
- South Australia from 31 January 2023
- New South Wales from 28 November 2023

The situation in the territories is different. Euthanasia was briefly legal in the Northern Territory under the Rights of the Terminally Ill Act 1995. In 1997, the Australian Federal Government overrode the Northern Territory legislation through the introduction of the Euthanasia Laws Act 1997; however, this was repealed in December 2022 with the passing of Restoring Territory Rights Act. During the brief period in which euthanasia was legal in the Northern Territory, Dr Philip Nitschke helped three people end their lives through assisted suicide.

==== India ====
Passive euthanasia is legal in India. On 7 March 2018 the Supreme Court of India legalised passive euthanasia by means of the withdrawal of life support to patients in a permanent vegetative state. Forms of active euthanasia, including the administration of lethal compounds, are illegal.

==== Israel ====
The Israeli Penal Law forbids causing the death of another person, and specifically forbids shortening the life of another. Passive euthanasia has been accepted in some cases under Israeli law. In 2005, proposals were put forward to allow passive euthanasia to be administered using a switch mechanism similar to Sabbath clocks. In 2006, the Steinberg Commission was set up to look into whether life and death issues could be rethought in the context of Jewish law, which suggested that hospitals could set up committees to determine whether patients would be given passive euthanasia.

==== Japan ====
The Japanese government has no official laws on the status of euthanasia and the Supreme Court of Japan has never ruled on the matter. Rather, to date, Japan's euthanasia policy has been decided by two local court cases, one in Nagoya in 1962, and another after an incident at Tokai University in 1995. The first case involved "passive euthanasia" (消極的安楽死, shōkyokuteki anrakushi) (i.e., allowing a patient to die by turning off life support) and the latter case involved "active euthanasia" (積極的安楽死, sekkyokuteki anrakushi) (e.g., through injection). The judgments in these cases set forth a legal framework and a set of conditions within which both passive and active euthanasia could be legal. Nevertheless, in both of these particular cases the doctors were found guilty of violating these conditions when taking the lives of their patients. Further, because the findings of these courts have yet to be upheld at the national level, these precedents are not necessarily binding. Nevertheless, at present, there is a tentative legal framework for implementing euthanasia in Japan.

In the case of passive euthanasia, three conditions must be met:

1. the patient must be suffering from an incurable disease, and in the final stages of the disease from which he/she is unlikely to make a recovery;
2. the patient must give express consent to stopping treatment, and this consent must be obtained and preserved prior to death. If the patient is not able to give clear consent, their consent may be determined from a pre-written document such as a living will or the testimony of the family;
3. the patient may be passively euthanized by stopping medical treatment, chemotherapy, dialysis, artificial respiration, blood transfusion, IV drip, etc.

For active euthanasia, four conditions must be met:

1. the patient must be suffering from unbearable physical pain;
2. death must be inevitable and drawing near;
3. the patient must give consent. (Unlike passive euthanasia, living wills and family consent will not suffice.)
4. the physician must have (ineffectively) exhausted all other measures of pain relief.

The problems that arose from this, in addition to the problem faced by many other families in the country, has led to the creation of "bioethics SWAT teams". These teams will be made available to the families of terminally ill patients in order to help them, along with the doctors, come to a decision based on the personal facts of the case. Though in its early stages and relying on "subsidies from the Ministry of Health, Labor and Welfare" there are plans to create a nonprofit organization to "allow this effort to continue."

==== New Zealand ====
Voluntary euthanasia is legal in New Zealand, following the enforcement of the End of Life Choice Act 2019 on 7 November 2021. Assisted suicide is illegal under Section 179 of the New Zealand Crimes Act 1961, which renders it a criminal offence to "aid and abet suicide", meaning the choice must solely be down to the individual on requirement that they have a terminal illness.

Two decriminalisation attempts – the Death With Dignity Bill 1995 and the Death With Dignity Bill 2003 – failed, the latter by only a three-vote margin within the New Zealand Parliament. In May 2012, Labour Party of New Zealand MP Maryan Street introduced a private member's bill into the ballot box, the End of Life Choices Bill, which was taken over by MP Iain Lees-Galloway when she failed to get re-elected in the 2014 General Election. The bill was dropped in December 2014 at the request of Labour Party leader Andrew Little as the issue was deemed to be distracting from bigger issues that concerned the party.

In November 2019, ACT MP David Seymour's End of Life Choice Bill, which will legalise assisted suicide for a select group of people if successful, passed its third reading 69 votes in favor to 51 opposed. In return for the New Zealand First party's support of the bill through its third reading, the bill was subject to a binding referendum held alongside the 2020 general election, which took place on 17 October 2020. The referendum passed with 65.1% of the vote, with the results officially declared on 7 November 2020. The End of Life Choice Act came into force on 7 November 2021, 12 months after the official results were declared.

==== Philippines ====
Active euthanasia is illegal in the Philippines. In 1997, the Philippine Senate considered passing a bill legalizing passive euthanasia. The bill met strong opposition from the country's Catholic Church. Under current laws, doctors assisting a patient to die can be imprisoned and charged with malpractice. The Philippine Medical Association recognize forms of passive euthanasia through withholding or discontinuing life support. However the lack of legislation which tackles passive euthanasia under a framework puts doctors at legal risk.

==== South Korea ====
The National Assembly and The Ministry of Health and Welfare voted in favor of passive euthanasia and went into effect since February 2018, and has announced to issue a "Well-Dying" Bill. However, the topic and debate of euthanasia in South Korea sparked for a long time, starting back on 4 December 1997 when a doctor was sent to prison for a major duration for voluntarily cutting life support of a braindead patient who injured himself from a head trauma, upon the request of his wife. This incident is well known in Korea as 'Boramae Hospital Incident' (보라매병원 사건). Another incident that sparked further debate was from the imprisonment of a father who unplugged a respirator for his braindead son.

Patients who qualify for active or passive euthanasia in South Korea are reserved for the terminally ill with a nonexistent chance of recovery. Patients who have a beneficial reaction to any medications, or are not in a rapidly deteriorating state of health leading to imminent death may not be qualified. Patients must have a confirmation of a registered physician and a doctor to die under dignity, and comatose patients must have the approval of both guardians.

==== Turkey ====
Euthanasia is strictly forbidden in Turkey. The aide who helped a person to suicide or other ways to kill oneself will be punished for assisting and encouraging suicide under the stipulation of article 84 of the Turkish Criminal Law. In condition of active euthanasia, article 81 of the same law sets forth that any person who carries out this act will be judged and punished for life imprisonment just like a simple murder.

=== Europe ===
==== Belarus ====
Euthanasia is illegal in Belarus.

==== Belgium ====
The Belgian Federal Parliament legalised euthanasia in 2002.

A survey published in 2010 reported that people who died from euthanasia (compared with those who died from other causes) were more often younger, male, cancer patients and more often died in their homes. In almost all cases, unbearable physical suffering was reported. Euthanasia for non-terminal patients was rare. There have been about 1,400 cases a year since the law was introduced, and a record 1,807 cases were recorded in 2013.

In December 2013, the Belgian Senate voted in favour of extending the euthanasia law to terminally ill children. Conditions imposed on children seeking euthanasia are that:

- the patient must be conscious of their decision and understand the meaning of euthanasia;
- the request must have been approved by the child's parents and medical team;
- the patient's illness must be terminal; and
- the patient's must be in great pain, with no available treatment to alleviate their distress.

A psychologist must also determine the patient's maturity to make the decision. The amended law emphasizes that the patient's request be voluntary. The first minor to be euthanized under these new regulations had his or her life ended in September 2016.

In September 2014, the Federal Euthanasia Commission gave convicted rapist and murderer Frank Van Den Bleeken the right to assisted suicide. Van Den Bleeken had served decades in prison for a 1989 crime and no longer wished to live. Over a dozen other inmates filed similar petitions. In January 2015, the Belgian justice ministry acknowledged that Van Den Bleeken's doctors recommended against this decision and that alternative psychological care would be sought for him.

In late 2014, a doctor administered a lethal dose of drugs to a patient who had struggled with mental illness for several years, upon the patient's request and with a rationale given that persons with a psychiatric illness should be afforded the same rights as those suffering from a physical illness.

In January 2020, the assizes court in Ghent acquitted three doctors of murder charges for euthanasia in 2010.

==== Czechia ====
In Czechia, known also as the Czech Republic, euthanasia and assisted suicide are illegal and both are considered homicide and are prohibited by Articles §140 for murder, §141 for manslaughter and §144 for participation on suicide of the Criminal Code.

==== Denmark ====
Parliament has assigned ethics panels over the years that have advised against legalisation each time however it is still not specifically outlawed and a study published in 2003 showed 41% of deaths under medical supervision involved doctors taking "end-of-life" decisions to help ease their patients' suffering before death (about 1% of which were via prescription drugs).

==== Finland ====
Active euthanasia is not legal in Finland. Passive euthanasia, however, is legal.

==== France ====
In July 2013, French President François Hollande stated his personal support for decriminalisation of voluntary euthanasia in France, which had been one of his presidential campaign promises ("introduction of the right to die with dignity"), despite objections from France's National Consultative Ethics Committee/ Comité national consultatif d'éthique, which alleged "abuses" in adjacent jurisdictions that have decriminalised and regulated either voluntary euthanasia or physician-assisted suicide (Belgium, Switzerland, the Netherlands and Luxembourg). More socially conservative members of the Catholic Church and other major religious groups in France had announced that after expressing an opposition to the introduction of same-sex marriage in France, their next target may be the possible decriminalisation of voluntary euthanasia.

In January 2016, both houses of France's parliament approved a measure that, while stopping short of euthanasia, would allow doctors to keep terminal patients sedated until death.

==== Germany ====
Passive euthanasia is legal in Germany if the patient has requested it. On 17 May 2014 the Federal Constitutional Court legalized passive euthanasia by means of the withdrawal of life support to patients who request euthanasia. Forms of active euthanasia, including the lethal compound administration, are illegal.

On 6 November 2015, the German Parliament passed a bill incriminating assisted suicide if it is done in a business-like manner. "Business-like" was meant by the legislator to include any recurrent assistance. Consequently, it typically included physicians. There did not need to be an intention to gain benefits.

On 2 March 2017, the Federal Administrative Court ruled that, in extreme circumstances, it was illegal that an agency denied access to life-ending substances. The relevant legal basis must be interpreted in accordance with the fundamental right to personal self-determination.

On 7 May 2019, the Federal Court of Justice, changing its previous judicature from 1984, confirmed that doctors have no obligation to stop the death of a person who, pursuant to a valid autonomous decision, attempts suicide.

On 26 February 2020, the Federal Constitutional Court ruled the provision which penalized assisted suicide services unconstitutional and thus void. The provision violated the fundamental right to personal self-determination.

==== Ireland ====
The Constitution of Ireland (Bunreacht na hÉireann) guarantees that the State shall by its laws "protect as best it may from unjust attack and, in the case of injustice done, vindicate the life of every citizen."

In Ireland, it is unlawful for any person (including a doctor or other health professional) to actively contribute to a person's death, Under the Criminal Law (Suicide) Act, 1993, a person who "aids, abets, counsels or procures" the suicide or attempted suicide of another person may be imprisoned, following conviction, for up to 14 years.

It is not, however, unlawful to remove life support and other medical treatment should a person (or their next of kin) request it. Doctors can stop giving a patient life-sustaining treatments, such as ventilators and feeding tubes, after being sedated, thus allowing the patient to die peacefully in their sleep; this only occurs in certain limited circumstances.

An Irish Times poll in 2010 indicated that a small majority of adults (57%), at that time, believed that medically assisted suicide should be legal for terminally ill patients who request it. A private member's bill by People Before Profit–Solidarity TD Gino Kenny to allow for assisted suicide – the Dying with Dignity Bill – was introduced in Dáil Éireann, the lower house of the Irish Parliament (Oireachtas), in September 2020. The bill passed its second reading, by 81 votes to 71 votes, in October 2020 and was referred to the Joint Oireachtas Committee on Justice.

The Justice Committee's report, published in July 2021, found that the bill had serious technical issues, may have unintended policy consequences if it were enacted (particularly regarding the lack of sufficient safeguards to protect against undue pressure being put on vulnerable people), and that the drafting of several sections contained serious flaws that could potentially render them vulnerable to challenge before the courts.

A Joint Oireachtas Committee on Assisted Dying to examine the issues raised was established in February 2023, and produced two reports in March 2024: a majority report in favour of legalising both assisted suicide and euthanasia, and a minority report calling for improved palliative care and opposing the legalisation of either practice. Both reports were referred to the Cabinet for consideration.

The Criminal Justice Act (Northern Ireland) 1966 prohibits acts that are capable of and intended for "encouraging or assisting" the suicide or attempted suicide of another person. The Act also makes suicide pacts and arranging for suicidal actions unlawful.

The Northern Ireland Assembly, as a devolved legislature within the United Kingdom, stated its opposition to any attempt to legalise assisted suicide in a resolution passed in October 2009.

==== Italy ====
Euthanasia is illegal in Italy. Article 579 of the Italian Criminal Code bans active euthanasia. Passive euthanasia was illegal under Article 580 of the Criminal Code until the Constitutional Court ruled such limitation to be unconstitutional in 2019.

==== Latvia ====
Euthanasia is not legal in Latvia. However a doctor may refuse further treatment of a patient if they believe it is the best course of action.

==== Lithuania ====
Euthanasia is not legal in Lithuania. However, as of 2016 a draft of a law about the right to die has been produced.

==== Luxembourg ====
The country's parliament passed a bill legalizing euthanasia on 20 February 2008 in the first reading with 30 of 59 votes in favour. On 19 March 2009, the bill passed the second reading, making Luxembourg the third European Union country, after the Netherlands and Belgium, to decriminalise euthanasia. Terminally ill patients will have the option of euthanasia after receiving the approval of two doctors and a panel of experts.

==== Moldova ====
All forms of euthanasia are banned in Moldova. They are prohibited by Articles 150 and 162 of the Criminal Code. According to their opinion:

Article 150. Determination or facilitation of suicide:

(1) Intentional determination or facilitation of suicide, including by means of electronic communications networks, resulting in suicide shall be punished by imprisonment from 2 to 5 years.

(2) The actions provided for in paragraph (1), committed:

a) knowingly against a minor;

b) on a person who is materially or otherwise dependent on the perpetrator, shall be punished by imprisonment from 5 to 9 years.

(3) The actions provided for in paragraph (1), committed on:

a) a minor up to 14 years of age;

b) two or more persons, shall be punished by imprisonment from 9 to 12 years.

(4) If the actions provided for in paragraphs (1) – (3) have resulted in a suicide attempt, the minimum sentence shall be reduced to half.

Article 162. Failure to provide assistance to a sick person:

(1) Failure to provide assistance, without good reason, to a sick person by a person who, by virtue of the law or special rules, was obliged to provide it is punishable by a fine of 550 to 850 conventional units or unpaid community service from 100 to 240 hours.

(2) The same act which provoked recklessly:

a) a serious injury to bodily integrity or health;

b) the death of the patient shall be punished by imprisonment for up to 5 years with deprivation of the right to hold certain positions or to exercise a certain activity for a term of up to 3 years.

==== Netherlands ====
In the 1973 "Postma case" a physician was convicted for having facilitated the death of her mother following repeated explicit requests for euthanasia. While upholding the conviction, the court's judgment set out criteria when a doctor would not be required to keep a patient alive contrary to their will. This set of criteria was formalized in the course of a number of court cases during the 1980s.

In 2001, the Netherlands passed a law legalizing euthanasia, including physician-assisted suicide. This law codifies the twenty-year-old convention of not prosecuting doctors who have committed euthanasia in very specific cases, under very specific circumstances. The Ministry of Public Health, Wellbeing and Sports claims that this practice "allows a person to end their life in dignity after having received every available type of palliative care." The United Nations has reviewed and commented on the Netherlands euthanasia law.

In September 2004 the Groningen Protocol was developed, which sets out criteria to be met for carrying out child euthanasia without the physician being prosecuted.

==== Norway ====
Active voluntary euthanasia remains illegal, though a caregiver may receive a reduced punishment for taking the life of someone who consents to it.

==== Poland ====
Active euthanasia in the Polish Criminal Code is defined as always appearing under the influence of sympathy for the suffering person and at their request. It is forbidden; it is treated as a kind of murder punishable in a milder way. The perpetrator is punishable by imprisonment of between 3 months and 5 years. Exceptionally, a court may apply leniency or even waive the sentence. The provision of Article 150 of the Penal Code, which defines the crime of euthanasia murder, does not, however, explicitly require the person requesting it to be terminally ill, but this requirement is introduced by case law. A specific type of crime related to euthanasia in the broad sense of the term is assistance to suicide (Article 151 of the Penal Code), which also includes so-called euthanasic assistance to suicide, i.e. facilitating the suicide of a terminally ill person.

==== Portugal ====
A 2020 poll showed 50.5% of the Portuguese supported decriminalisation of euthanasia.

In February 2020, following the 2019 elections, a bill decriminalising euthanasia was passed by centre-left, left-wing and liberal parties in the Assembly of the Republic . On 29 January 2021, the Assembly of the Republic approved the final version of the law with 136 votes in favour. The President of the Republic, Marcelo Rebelo de Sousa - a practising Catholic - asked the country's Constitutional Court to review the law on 18 February. On 15 March, the top court ruled that the language of the law was imprecise in identifying the circumstances under which the procedures for administering euthanasia could occur and thus declared it unconstitutional.

After being sent back to Parliament, the bill was re-worded and passed again. On 5 November 2021, the Portuguese Parliament passed the revised version of the bill which attempted to address constitutional concerns. The President vetoed the bill again after consulting with the Constitutional Court.

On 9 June 2022, Portuguese lawmakers made a third attempt, approving the bill generally in Parliament and definitively on 9 December 2022. The text now defined physician-assisted death as death which "occurs by a person's own decision, in the exercise of his fundamental right to self-determination," and when it is "carried out or assisted by a health care professional". It would apply exclusively to adults presenting "suffering of great intensity, permanent injuries of extreme gravity, or a serious and incurable disease". It also established a minimum period of two months between the start of the process and the physician-assisted death, and provided for compulsory psychological support for the patient. The President decided to send it back to the Portuguese Constitutional Court for "preemptive review" citing that "legal certainty and security are essential in the central area of rights, freedoms, and guarantees." On 31 January 2023, the Court yet again rejected the law, pointing to an "intolerable vagueness" in its wording and sent the text back to Parliament which had been trying to legislate in favour of euthanasia for almost three years. The Parliament moved to redraft the text and resubmit it for promulgation by the same President of the Republic. Socialist Party MP Isabel Moreira, a fervent advocate of legalising euthanasia, reacted by saying that it was only a "semantic problem" and that "most of the arguments of the president of the Republic have not been admitted", proceeding to note that "if it is a question of correcting a word, we will be there to do so".

The yet again reworded bill, which the head of state had vetoed on 29 April for the fourth time, was reconfirmed on 12 May by a majority in Parliament, finally being promulgated by the President on 16 May. Article 136.º, nº 2 of the Portuguese Constitution requires that, after the veto of a bill, "if the Assembly of the Republic confirms the vote by an absolute majority of the Deputies in office, the President of the Republic must promulgate the diploma within eight days of receiving it". MP Isabel Moreira said the Parliament was "reaffirming a law that has already been approved several times by a huge majority".

The Law n.º 22/2023, of 22 May, legalized physician-assisted death, which can be done by physician-assisted suicide and euthanasia. Physician-assisted death can only be permitted to adults, by their own decision, who are experiencing suffering of great intensity and who have a permanent injury of extreme severity or a serious and incurable disease. Physician-assisted death can only occur by euthanasia when physician-assisted suicide is impossible due to the patient's physical incapacity.

The law is not yet in force, it's awaiting the drafting and approval of regulation by the government. The law states in Article 31 that the government must approve the regulation of the law within 90 days of being published in the Diário da República, which would have been on 23 August 2023. However, the regulation was not approved by this date. On 24 November 2023, the Ministry of Health said the regulation of the law would be the responsibility of the new government following the 10 March 2024 elections. According to Article 34, the law will only enter into force 30 days after the regulation is published. As of 1 May 2026 the regulation has not yet been drafted and approved. The centre-right government considers that conditions are not yet right to move forward, citing a lack of "legal certainty" and decisions by the Constitutional Court as the main obstacles. The legislation, published on 25 May 2023, allows for medically assisted death in cases of serious and incurable illness or permanent injury of extreme severity. However, several provisions were deemed unconstitutional, which, according to the government, affected central elements of the legislation. The government understands that this is a matter of high ethical, legal, and clinical sensitivity, requiring prudence before any progress is made.

==== Romania ====
Euthanasia in Romania is illegal. According to the Criminal Code, euthanasia in Romania is not allowed and is punishable by imprisonment from 1 to 5 years.

"The murder committed at the explicit, serious, conscious and repeated request of the victim who was suffering from an incurable disease or a serious medical illness, causing permanent suffering and unbearable, is punishable by imprisonment from one to five years," according to article 190 of the newest Penal Code.

==== Russia ====
Euthanasia is illegal in Russia. As of November 2011 a Russian Federal Law No.323 bans euthanasia under provision of Article 45. However, there is no known law that punishes specifically illegal euthanasia practices.

Active euthanasia was briefly made legal in Soviet Russia in 1922.

==== Serbia ====
Euthanasia is illegal in Serbia. As Article 117, "Compassionate Murder" recalls — "Whoever deprives an adult of his life out of compassion due to the difficult health condition in which that person finds himself, and at his serious and explicit request, will be punished by imprisonment from six months to five years."

==== Slovakia ====
In Slovakia, euthanasia is prohibited, because according to criminal law it is a crime and at the same time according to Art. 15 par. 2 of the Constitution of the Slovak Republic "no one shall be deprived of his life."

==== Spain ====
Active euthanasia and assisted suicide are legal in Spain.

In February 2020 the Spanish parliament voted to approve plans to legalise voluntary euthanasia. The bill went to committee and the Senate before a final vote in the lower house. The lower house approved the bill in December 2020.

On 17 December 2020, the Congress of Deputies passed a bill to regulate the right to euthanasia. The final draft, whose intellectual authorship was attributed to María Luisa Carcedo, commanded the support from 192 legislators (PSOE, Podemos, ERC, Ciudadanos, Junts per Catalunya, PNV, Bildu, CUP, Más País, BNG), the opposition from 138 (PP, Vox, UPN) and 2 abstentions. Given widespread parliamentary support and the incorporation of minor amendments, the law returned to the Congress of Deputies for final approval.

On 18 March 2021, Spain's parliament voted in favour of the final reading of the bill, thus making it law. It was sanctioned by the King on 24 March 2021 and published in the BOE the next day. The law came into force on 25 June 2021, three months after its publication.

==== Sweden ====
Passive euthanasia was deemed legal after a landmark court ruling in 2010. That means a health care professional can legally cease life support upon request from a patient if they understand the consequences stated by their health care provider, but administering a lethal substance is illegal.

==== Switzerland ====
In Switzerland, deadly drugs may be prescribed to a Swiss person or to a foreigner, where the recipient takes an active role in the drug administration. More generally, article 115 of the Swiss penal code, which came into effect in 1942 (having been written in 1918), considers assisting suicide a crime only if the motive is selfish.

==== United Kingdom ====
Active euthanasia is illegal in the United Kingdom. Any person found to be assisting suicide is breaking the law and can be convicted of assisting suicide or attempting to do so. Between 2003 and 2006 Lord Joffe made four attempts to introduce bills that would have legalised voluntary euthanasia – all were rejected by the UK Parliament. Currently, Dr Nigel Cox is the only British doctor to have been convicted of attempted euthanasia. He was given a 12-month suspended sentence in 1992.

In regard to the principle of double effect, in 1957 Judge Devlin in the trial of Dr John Bodkin Adams ruled that causing death through the administration of lethal drugs to a patient, if the intention is solely to alleviate pain, is not considered murder even if death is a potential or even likely outcome.

Passive euthanasia is legal, by way of advance decisions giving patients the right to refuse life saving treatment. Food and liquid can also be withdrawn from someone in a permanent vegetative state without the need for court approval.

==== Ukraine ====
Euthanasia is prohibited in Ukraine.

== Non-governmental organizations ==
There are a number of historical studies about the thorough euthanasia-related policies of professional associations. In their analysis, Brody et al. (2001), found it necessary to distinguish such topics as euthanasia, physician-assisted suicide, informed consent and refusal, advance directives, pregnant patients, surrogate decision-making (including neonates), DNR orders, irreversible loss of consciousness, quality of life (as a criterion for limiting end-of-life care), withholding and withdrawing intervention, and futility. Similar distinctions presumably are found outside the U.S., as with the highly contested statements of the British Medical Association. (Note: For professional policies in the English-speaking world, see this selection by an advocacy NGO.)

On euthanasia (narrowly defined here as directly causing death), Brody et al. (2001) sums up the U.S. medical NGO arena:

The debate in the ethics literature on euthanasia is just as divided as the debate on physician-assisted suicide, perhaps more so. Slippery-slope arguments are often made, supported by claims about abuse of voluntary euthanasia in the Netherlands.... Arguments against it are based on the integrity of medicine as a profession. In response, autonomy and quality-of-life-base arguments are made in support of euthanasia, underscored by claims that when the only way to relieve a dying patient's pain or suffering is terminal sedation with loss of consciousness, death is a preferable alternative – an argument also made in support of physician-assisted suicide.

Other NGOs that advocate for and against various euthanasia-related policies are found throughout the world. Among proponents, perhaps the leading NGO is the UK's Dignity in Dying, the successor to the (Voluntary) Euthanasia Society. In an unsympathetic account, the International Task Force on Euthanasia and Assisted Suicide has detailed the ebb and flow of euthanasia proponents. In addition to professional and religious groups, there are NGOs opposed to euthanasia found in various countries.

== See also ==
- List of deaths from legal euthanasia and assisted suicide
- Right to die
- Suicide legislation
