= Bajón =

Bajón, or bajón, may refer to:

- the Spanish name of the dulcian, a Renaissance woodwind instrument predecessor of the modern bassoon
- Miguel Ángel Rodríguez Bajón (born in 1964), Spanish politician

Bajon is a family name of Polish origin :

- Anthony Bajon (born in 1994), French actor
- Filip Michał Bajon (born in 1947), Polish film director.
