= Euthanasia and assisted suicide in Spain =

Euthanasia and assisted suicide in Spain have been legal since 25 June 2021, when the Organic Law for the Regulation of Euthanasia came into force, three months after its publication in the Boletín Oficial del Estado (BOE; English: Official State Gazette), after being approved by the Cortes Generales on 18 March 2021. Said law decriminalizes medical aid to die and specifies who, when and with what requirements it may be provided. With its approval, Spain became the sixth state in the world to recognize nationwide the right to euthanasia. Between June 2021 and December 2022, there have been an estimated 370 cases of euthanasia deaths.

== History ==
In 1984 the Spanish federation Derecho a Morir Dignamente (Right to Die with Dignity) was founded under the name Association Right to Die with dignity - DMD. On December 13, 1984, the DMD association under the number 57889 was registered within the Ministry of the Interior, legalizing a citizen movement to respect the freedom of the individual at the end of their life. This association considers Carlos Gómez as the pioneer of the fight in Spain for the recognition of euthanasia. Gómez, a man from Santander with leukemia, published that same year of 1984 an opinion forum in the newspaper El País titled Dare to die gives life. In it he said: «There is no doubt that a social taboo that is much more repressive than the one that worked on sex has begun to break down. I mean the taboo of death, or better, the way to die». Carlos Gómez died the following year without heeding his living will.

In 1986, the General Health Law approved that year allowed patients to refuse treatment requesting voluntary discharge.

The case of Ramón Sampedro, which had an enormous impact, was the one that brought the issue of euthanasia in Spain to the fore today. In 1993 Sampedro, a quadriplegic since 1969, made public his wish to be helped to die. As he did not get legal permission for this assisted suicide, he asked for the collaboration of eleven people so that each one of them did a part of the process that would lead him to take his own life and thus protect them from being prosecuted. On January 11, 1998, his friend Ramona Maneiro left everything ready, including the camera that was going to record the event. Sampedro committed suicide the next day. In the recording, he reiterated his wish to die, and the agony he suffered after taking the poison was also recorded. The police detained Ramona Maneiro, but they had to release her due to lack of evidence. Seven years later, when the crime had prescribed, Ramona Maneiro recounted everything that happened. In 2004, the film Mar adentro was released, directed by Alejandro Amenábar and starring Javier Bardem in the role of Ramón Sampedro.

In 2002, Law 41/2002 Regulating Patient Autonomy and Rights and Obligations Regarding Health Information and Documentation (called the Patient Autonomy Law) reaffirmed the autonomy of patients, allowing them to individually reject a treatment without demanding any justification for it, known as passive euthanasia. Four years later, in October 2006, Inmaculada Echevarría, who had suffered from progressive muscular dystrophy for 22 years, asked to avail herself of the law but the religious hospital in Granada where she was admitted refused to sedate her or disconnect her from the respirator that allowed her to stay alive. The Junta de Andalucía had to intervene, and she was transferred to a public hospital where they agreed to her wish and where she died the following year. A similar case was the one that happened to Pedro Martínez, a patient with amyotrophic lateral sclerosis (ALS), because the medical team that treated him in Seville refused to sedate him, claiming that he was not dying. The solution was to change medical team. He died in December 2011.

Subsequently, up to eleven autonomous communities passed laws for the terminally ill, which recognized their right to renounce treatment and receive final sedation.

In 2005, Dr. Luis Montes Mieza — at that time the emergency coordinator of the Severo Ochoa Hospital in Leganés — and Dr. Miguel Ángel López Varas were investigated by the Department of Health of the Community of Madrid, led by Manuel Lamela Fernández, due to two anonymous complaints in which they were accused of high-dose sedation in terminally ill patients in the Emergency Service of the Severo Ochoa Hospital. The report presented by the Ministry of Health identified 73 cases of sedation allegedly carried out incorrectly between September 1, 2003 and March 8, 2005. In 2005, Dr. Montes Mieza was dismissed from the position of coordinator at the request of Lamela. In January 2008, the courts closed the case by ratifying the dismissal was already determined in June 2007 and suppressed the legal basis that referred to the malpractice of the defendants.

In early 2007 the suicide of Madeleine Z., who suffered from ALS and who had sought the advice of DMD to end her life, became known. For this reason, the DMD volunteers who had accompanied her at the time of her suicide, and the journalist who reported the case, were investigated, but the case was dismissed.

In 2009, Dr. Marcos Ariel Hourmann was the first doctor convicted because of euthanasia. He was sentenced to one year in prison for administering intravenous potassium chloride, ending the life and suffering of an 82-year-old woman who expressly requested her death due to her irreversible pain.

In April 2017, José Antonio Arrabal, sick with ALS, committed suicide and recorded himself with a camera so that there would be proof that he had done it to end his suffering since the doctors who treated him considered that he was not in a terminal situation. «What I have left is a deterioration until I end up being a vegetable. I want to be able to decide the ending. And the current situation does not guarantee it ", referring to the non-existence of a euthanasia law.

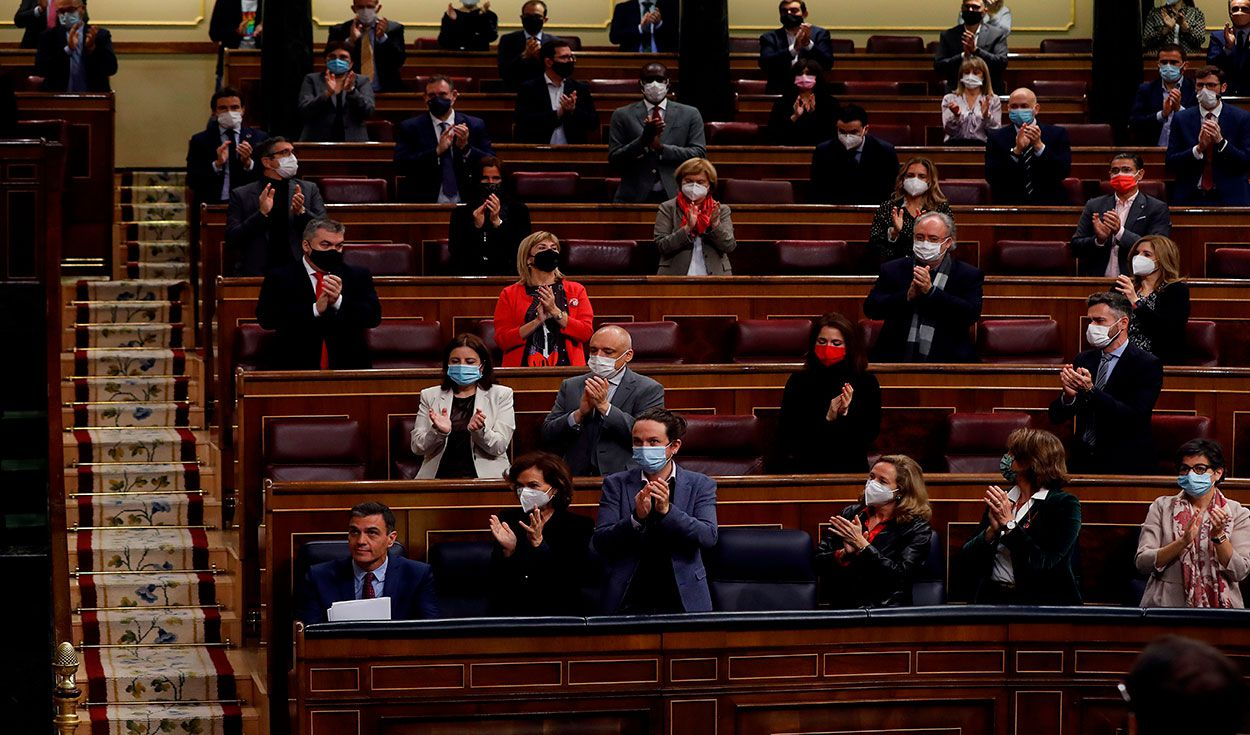
Members of the Spanish government and deputies clap after the approval of the Euthanasia Law in the Congress of the Deputies by 198 votes in favor and 138 against.

In April 2019, María José Carrasco, sick with Multiple Sclerosis for 30 years, ended her life with the help of her husband Ángel Hernández. They recorded the suicide on video, in which he asked her if she wanted him to help her end her long suffering, to which she answered yes, being able to observe then how she drank a toxic solution with a straw, using the little mobility that he had left, which caused her a death without suffering. This event was the germ of a greater follow-up and popular mobilization in favor of a euthanasia law in Spain, which had been claimed for years without success. As of 2020, the case was in the hands of court number 25 in Madrid awaiting resolution, as Ángel Hernández was accused of violence against his wife. In 2021, Hernández was absolved of all wrongdoing.

On December 17, 2020, the XIV legislature of the Congress of Deputies approved a bill to regulate the right to active euthanasia. It obtained 198 votes in favor (PSOE, Unidas Podemos, BNG, ERC, Junts per Catalunya, Más País, Bildu, PNV, Nueva Canarias, Coalición Canaria, CUP, Ciudadanos), 138 against (PP, Vox, UPN) and 2 abstentions. After being approved with amendments in the Senate, the proposal returned to the Congress of Deputies where it was finally approved, so that on March 18, 2021 the euthanasia law was approved by the Cortes Generales and later entered into force three months later after its publication in the BOE.

Catholic sectors led by the Spanish Episcopal Conference showed their opposition to the euthanasia law.

In the biomedical field, the Collegiate Medical Organization expressed in a statement that the bill "is contrary to our Code of Medical Deontology and contradicts the positions of the World Medical Association". Similarly, the Official College of Pharmacists of Madrid (COFM), the College of Dentists and Stomatologists of Region I (COEM), and the Illustrious Official College of Physicians of Madrid (ICOMEM), in a joint statement, declared their opposition to the bill. The Council of Medical Associations of Catalonia (CCMC), although it was in favor of the law, warned that the registry of professional conscientious objectors "may not guarantee the preservation of this constitutional right." In the same statement, they supported "enhancing palliative care."

== Legal status ==
In Spain, euthanasia is regulated by the Organic Law for the regulation of euthanasia, promulgated by the Cortes Generales in March 2021. The law refers to euthanasia as the action that directly and actively causes the death of a person, by part of health personnel, either by administering a substance that causes death or by prescribing it so that the person can self-administer it, either in a healthcare center or at home. An informed and repeated petition process must first be carried out over time, in a context of serious and incurable chronic and disabling illness, which causes intolerable suffering. The entire procedure will be framed within the public health system and will be publicly financed, while the health system itself will have to guarantee this right to whoever wants it and meets the requirements. The death resulting from the provision of aid to die will be considered natural death for all purposes. Precisely because euthanasia is considered as a healthcare provision and the resulting death as a natural one, this practice cannot be halted by the criminal justice system. For this reason, even individuals under arrest or judicial investigation may request and receive euthanasia, as affirmed by the Provincial Court of Tarragona in 2022.

To request this procedure, five requirements must be given, which are expressed in this way in the law document:

- To have Spanish nationality or legal residence in Spain, be of legal age and be capable and aware at the time of application.
- To have in writing the information that exists about the medical process, the different alternatives and possibilities of action, including that of accessing palliative care.
- To have made two requests voluntarily and in writing, leaving a period of at least fifteen calendar days between the two of them. If the responsible doctor considers that the death of the requesting person or the loss of their capacity to grant informed consent is imminent, they may accept any shorter period that they consider appropriate based on the concurrent clinical circumstances, of which they must record in the clinical history of the patient.
- To suffer from a serious and incurable disease or suffering from a serious, chronic and disabling disease in the terms established in this law, certified by the responsible doctor.
- To give informed consent prior to receiving the aid to die. Said consent will be incorporated into the clinical history of the patient.

It could also be the case where the person has previously written an advance directive document naming a person to represent them.

At some point in this process, the health professional who handles the case could come to consider that the person does not have the understanding or autonomy to decide, without this having to imply a legal incapacity, and would have to complain to the evaluation commission in charge in each autonomous community. The lack of definition of this aspect in the law itself could pose a risk since in the case in which it is considered that the person has not been properly evaluated and euthanasia was carried out, it could be considered as cooperation with suicide or even like homicide.

The law recognizes the individual right of health professionals to exercise the right of conscientious objection, and thus not have to meet those demands for health action that are incompatible with their own convictions.

== Euthanasia in Catalonia ==
The Guarantee and Evaluation Commission of Catalonia was authorized by decreed law 13/2021 of 22 June 2021 of the President of the Government of Catalonia, as validated by the Parliament of Catalonia on 21 July. On 5 July, the Catalonian Minister of Health appointed its first 11 members, later expanded to 18 in November 2022.

A widely reported case in the community was the Noelia Castillo euthanasia case.

== Public opinion ==
According to various polls, the majority of the Spanish population supported the decriminalization of euthanasia, as well as its legalization for terminally ill patients. — 86% in 2018 — and for non-terminal patients — 62% in 2018 —. Polls indicate that support has grown over the years.

According to a CIS survey carried out in 2009, 75% of those surveyed declared themselves in favor of active euthanasia (and of them 60% were totally convinced), 17% against (and of them 11% totally convinced); although the answers could vary according to the clinical case that arose.

In statistics carried out later in 2017 and 2018, the percentage that responds in favor rises to 85%, finding population groups where this percentage decreases, such as among practicing religious people, people over 65 years of age or conservative voters, groups where support is over 60%.

Among medical groups, percentage is similar. According to a 2019 survey carried out by the Colleges of various communities, 86.39% were in favor (67% with total confidence and 19% showed certain doubts).

== In fiction ==
Euthanasia has been treated in Spanish films, such as:

- Mar adentro
- Tapas

== See also ==
- Legality of euthanasia
- Assisted suicide
- Euthanasia in the Netherlands
- Euthanasia in Canada
- Noelia Castillo euthanasia case
