= Assisted suicide of Sophia =

2022 death in Canada

Sophia (born 1970 or 1971, died February 22, 2022) was the pseudonym of a 51-year old Canadian woman who sought and received medical assistance in dying (MAID) to end her life in 2022 after failing to find housing free from tobacco smoke and other alleged environmental triggers of her multiple chemical sensitivity (MCS) syndrome. She is reported to be the first person in the world to use MAID in response to MCS. MCS is a controversial diagnosis that is not recognized as a disease by the World Health Organization, although it is recognized in Canada as a disability that requires accommodation in some contexts. As of 2020, about 3.5% of Canadians reported having MCS, a figure that had risen from 1.9% in 2000. Canadian law has authorized MAID under some circumstances since 2016, and its eligibility was expanded in March 2021.

== Sophia ==
Sophia was a 51-year old Canadian woman who had multiple chemical sensitivity (MCS), an alleged disease where individuals report varying symptoms in response to a variety of chemicals, commonly perfumes or scents used in detergent. She lived at the Salvation Army's Grace Communities residential apartments in Toronto and obtained care from the city's Women's College Hospital. With support from friends, Sophia spent two years trying to find affordable housing that did not expose her to cigarette smoke and the scent of chemical cleaners. Her search was not successful, despite her appeals to the Government of Canada, the Government of Ontario, and her municipal government. Sophia reportedly spent an increased amount of time at home due to the public health measures implemented in response to the COVID-19 pandemic. No specific government agency in Canada is tasked with helping people with alleged environmental sensitivities find special housing.

Sophia reportedly avoided media attention prior to her death, concerned that it would thwart her ability to have medical assistance in dying. On February 14, 2022, Sophia recorded a video, later shared to CTV News in which she said: "The government sees me as expendable trash, a complainer, useless and a pain in the ass". To protect the privacy of her family, she asked her friends to share the video but to use the pseudonym of "Sophia" to refer to her.

== Death and aftermath ==
Sophia died on February 22, 2022, making use of new legal rights to obtain MAID that existed in Canada since March 17, 2021.

Rohini Peris, President of the Environmental Health Association of Québec, said, after her death: "This person begged for help for years, two years, wrote everywhere, called everywhere, asking for healthy housing."

== See also ==
- Euthanasia in Canada
