= Zoraya ter Beek =

Dutch psychiatric patient (1995–2024)

Zoraya ter Beek (2 May 1995 – 22 May 2024) was a 29-year-old Dutch woman who underwent euthanasia on the grounds of unbearable mental suffering. Her case gained international attention and reignited debates on euthanasia laws, particularly regarding mental illness.

== Early life and background ==
Zoraya ter Beek was born in 1995 and grew up in Oldenzaal, Netherlands. She struggled with mental health issues from an early age, experiencing depression, anxiety, autism spectrum disorder and a personality disorder. Despite initially aspiring to become a psychiatrist, her conditions worsened, leading to difficulties in education and employment.

== Mental health struggles and medical history ==
Ter Beek sought treatment for over a decade, including therapy, psychiatric medications, and more than 30 sessions of electroconvulsive therapy. Despite extensive efforts, her doctors concluded that her suffering was incurable. In 2020, after being informed that no further treatment options were available, she began seeking approval for euthanasia. She wore a "Do Not Resuscitate" tag from the age of 22.

== Public and media reactions ==
Ter Beek's euthanasia drew significant attention from international media, including prominent coverage by The Guardian, The Free Press, Fox News, the New York Post and People. She publicly documented the legal and medical process of euthanasia on her X account. Her story sparked intense public debate, highlighting the ethical complexities of euthanasia for mental illness.

=== Ethical and legal debate ===
The Netherlands is one of the few countries that allows euthanasia for psychiatric disorders. Ter Beek's case highlighted tensions between suicide prevention and assisted dying laws. Critics questioned whether psychiatric suffering can be deemed incurable, while supporters argued that psychological pain can be as unbearable as physical illness.

== Legacy and impact ==
Ter Beek's death has influenced ongoing discussions on assisted dying policies. Her case has been cited in legislative debates in countries considering euthanasia expansion. Dutch authorities continue to review psychiatric euthanasia cases, with calls for both increased mental health support and clearer safeguards in euthanasia laws.

== See also ==
- Euthanasia for mental illness
- Noa Pothoven
- Noelia Castillo
