= Winnen of Leren =

2018 autobiography by Noa Pothoven

Winnen of leren
- Author: Noa Pothoven
- Language: Dutch
- Genre: Non-fiction
- Published: 2 November 2018, Uitgeverij Boekscout
- Publication place: The Netherlands
- Pages: 373
- ISBN: 9789402248234

Winnen of Leren (English: 'Winning or Learning') is the autobiography of Dutch author and mental health activist Noa Pothoven, which was published in November 2018.

== Background ==
Winnen of Leren was published when Pothoven was 16 years old and criticised youth mental health care in her country, won a prize for non-fiction and made her well-known. The book contains Pothoven's diaries concerning her hospitalisations for PTSD as a result of rape, and covers her struggle with depression, self-harm, anorexia and wish to have euthanasia.

=== Reception ===
The book became controversial following Pothoven's death in June 2019, which was wrongfully attributed by foreign media to active euthanasia.
