= Frank Van Den Bleeken =

Belgian serial rapist and murderer

Frank Van Den Bleeken is a Belgian serial rapist and murderer who campaigned to have doctors euthanase him after having served over 30 years in prison. Fifteen other Belgian inmates have made similar requests. Since Belgium legalised euthanasia in 2002, around 1,400 Belgians a year have chosen it. The number increased to over 1,800 cases in 2013; of these, 67 were for psychological reasons.

In September 2014, Belgium's justice minister confirmed that Van Den Bleeken would be allowed to die. The sisters of his last victim were opposed to the decision, preferring that he be left to "rot in his cell". He had first asked for the right to die three years earlier. According to his lawyer, he was "suffering unbearably" from a psychological condition that doctors agreed was incurable. On 3 January 2015 Belgian media reported that Van Den Bleeken would be euthanised in jail in Bruges on 11 January.

On 6 January 2015, it was revealed that Van Den Bleeken would not be euthanised. The justice minister announced the cancellation following Van Den Bleeken's doctors' decision "to no longer continue the euthanasia procedure". He was to be moved instead to a psychiatric prison ward in Ghent while authorities considered his transfer to a specialist treatment facility in the Netherlands.
