= Noa Pothoven =

Dutch mental health activist and author (2001–2019)

Noa Pothoven (8 December 2001 – 2 June 2019) was a Dutch mental health activist and author. Her death at the age of 17 sparked global controversy due to public statements she made about her wish to die, her activism concerning youth mental health care, and foreign media reports that incorrectly attributed her eventual death to active euthanasia. Many foreign news outlets wrongfully stated Pothoven was euthanised under the Dutch 2001 Termination of Life on Request and Assisted Suicide (Review Procedures) Act.

== Life and activism ==
Noa Pothoven was born in 2001 in Arnhem and had two younger siblings. Her autobiography, Winnen of Leren (English: 'Winning or Learning'), which was published when she was 16 years old and criticised youth mental health care in her country, won a prize for non-fiction and made her well-known.

In December 2018, De Gelderlander published an interview with Pothoven and her family about her autobiography and Pothoven's wish to have euthanasia. In the interview, Pothoven spoke of her battle with PTSD as a result of rape, her anorexia and self-harm, her having to wait over-long for treatment, and her disappointment about being refused euthanasia after 20 hospitalisations due to several suicide attempts. She requested assisted suicide at a clinic in the Hague without her parents' knowledge and was refused based on her age. In her book, she wrote that she had been sexually assaulted at a school party when she was 11 and again a year later at a teenagers' party. When she was 14, she wrote, she was raped by two men in Arnhem's Elderveld district. She was too ashamed to tell her family about the rapes; they learned about them after discovering farewell letters she had written, and she was never able to bring herself to make a police report.

In March 2019, Pothoven told the Dutch edition of Vice that she wrote her autobiography during her hospitalisations (during some of which she was in civil commitment). She said that she "spent two to three months in the isolation cell every evening, night and morning", being forced to wear a paper dress so she would not be able to hang herself with it, and under constant camera surveillance. Pothoven said that her autobiography started out as a diary and that she eventually published it to break social stigma surrounding mental health. Prior to her death, Pothoven's book led to questions from politician Lisa Westerveld in the Dutch House of Representatives about psychiatric youthcare. Pothoven said of her own civil commitment and being forced to go to court because of it: "[I]f you are in danger of being admitted, the juvenile court will decide on that. As a young person you also have a lawyer who represents your interests. The sessions in the courtroom made a huge impression on me. I sat there as if I were a criminal, while I have never stolen a candy. As far as I am concerned, depressed youngsters should not go to court."

In April 2019, a month before she died, Pothoven wrote a guest article and poem for the website of vocational university Hogeschool Leiden to bring attention to youth mental health care. Pothoven wrote she suffered from complex post-traumatic stress disorder, anorexia, depression, obsessive–compulsive disorder, a personality disorder, self-harm and psychosis, but that PTSD as a result of sexual violence was "the real problem". She wrote that her therapies had been mainly focused on symptomatic treatment, for example her anorexia, depression and self-harm, but not on the underlying problem, her PTSD. She pleaded for better psychiatric help for youth and stated that the waiting lists for treatment programs were "bizarre" and should be reduced.

== Death and media reactions ==
In May 2019, Pothoven stopped eating and drinking. She had previously been put into an induced coma in 2018 so doctors could feed her through a feeding tube, but Pothoven's family decided to respect her decision in 2019, and provide only palliative care. On 30 May 2019 Pothoven made a final Instagram post in which she said: "After years of battling and fighting, I am drained. I have quit eating and drinking for a while now, and after many discussions and evaluations, it was decided to let me go because my suffering is unbearable." On 2 June 2019 Pothoven's sister confirmed her death at the age of 17. Pothoven spent her last days in a hospital bed in her family's living room while saying goodbye to her friends and family.

Many news outlets outside the Netherlands initially reported her death as an assisted suicide under the Dutch euthanasia law. Some reported that she was given a lethal injection. Reactions condemning assisted suicide included a tweet by Pope Francis.

Reporters from several countries sought out Pothoven's family days after her death. The family responded in the Dutch media about their regrets that it has been suggested in foreign media that their daughter died from active euthanasia and said they "hope that her story serves a higher purpose and that help provided to vulnerable young people with psychological problems in the Netherlands will be improved. Noa pleaded for an institution where young people like herself can go for both the psychological and physical help they need." Some media published corrections to their initial accounts.

== Publications ==
- Winnen of Leren (2018) (in Dutch)

== See also ==
- Childhood trauma
- Coping planning
- Crisis intervention
- Depression
- Factors associated with being a victim of sexual violence
- List of books written by children or teenagers
- Nicaea (mythology) (traumatic rape in Greek mythology)
- Post-assault treatment of sexual assault victims
- Rape trauma syndrome
- Suicide prevention
- Youth suicide
- Zoraya ter Beek
