= Miguel Ángel Rodríguez Bajón =

Spanish politician, publicist and journalist (born 1964)

Miguel Ángel Rodríguez
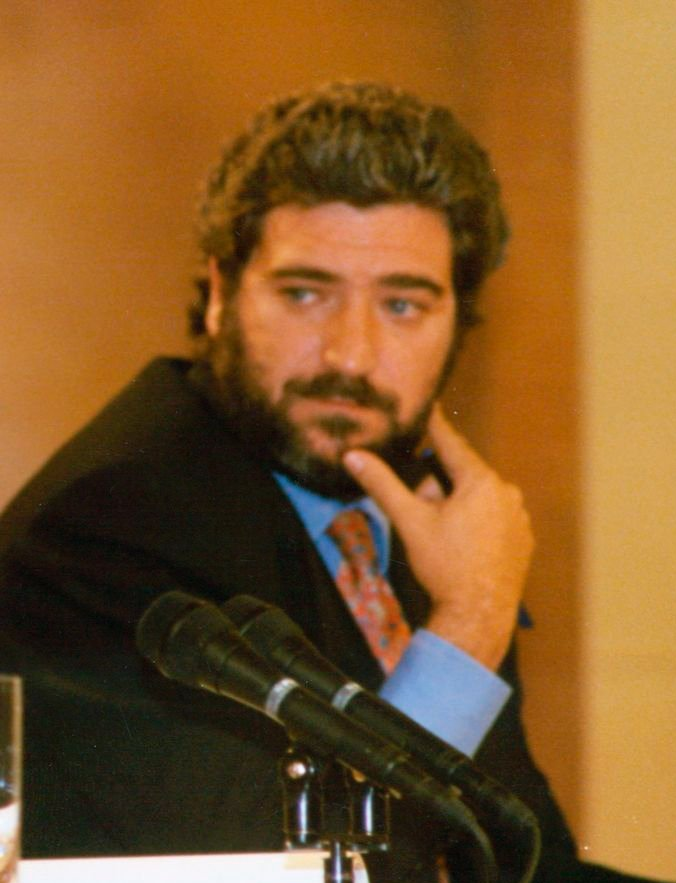
- In August 1996

Member of the Congress of Deputies
- In office 25 March 1996 – 10 May 1996
- Constituency: Madrid

Personal details
- Born: 1964 (age 61–62) Valladolid, Spain
- Party: People's Party
- Occupation: Politician, publicist, media consultant, journalist

Miguel Ángel Rodríguez Bajón (born 1964), often going by the MAR acronym, is a Spanish politician, publicist, media consultant and journalist.

== Biography ==
He was born in 1964 in Valladolid. A young journalist writing for the El Norte de Castilla, the "Bachiller" (as Miguel Ángel Rodríguez was sometimes known for his lack of higher studies) met José María Aznar (then bidding for the presidency of the Junta of Castile and León) in the campaign bus before the 1987 Castilian-Leonese regional election.

Following the election, Aznar, who was invested regional president, appointed Rodríguez as Spokesperson of the Junta of Castile and León; Rodríguez served for the 1987–1989 spell during which Aznar presided the regional government. During his mandate as Spokesperson of the regional government in Castile and León, he reportedly elaborated a blacklist of journalists, compiling political, personal and professional assessments on 12 journalists. He has been mentioned as a core member of the so-called "Clan of Valladolid", a circle of people around Aznar, that eventually got to lead the People's Party (PP) from Génova Street, holding top posts during the years of Aznar in La Moncloa as Prime Minister. He followed Aznar after the later was designated as successor of Manuel Fraga at the helm of the newly created PP, as was hired as the Aznar's director of communications in 1990.

He ran 12th in the PP's list in Madrid for the 1996 Congressional election. Elected, he served as member of the Lower House for less than two months. Following the investiture of Aznar as Prime Minister, he renounced to his seat and was appointed to the dual post of Secretary of State for Press and Spokesperson of the Government in the Aznar government. He left the Government in July 1998 citing "personal reasons", and was replaced as Spokesperson of the Government by Josep Piqué. He then started a career in the private sector in the fields of advertising and media.

In April 2011 the Provincial Audience of Madrid sentenced Rodríguez to pay a €30,000 fine after Rodríguez called Dr. Luis Montes a "nazi" and accused him of "killing people without their permission"; the sentence was ratified in November 2011.

In 2019, PP's Isabel Díaz Ayuso hired MAR as consultant vis-à-vis the campaign for the 2019 Madrilenian regional election. In January 2020, months after the investiture of Díaz Ayuso as regional president, she appointed Miguel Ángel Rodríguez as Chief of Staff, reportedly to the despair of her vice-president Ignacio Aguado, whom Miguel Ángel Rodríguez had previously dubbed as "the disloyal one".

Political offices
Preceded by Alfredo Pérez Rubalcaba	Spokesperson of the Government; 1996–1998	Succeeded by Josep Piqué
