= Maurice Généreux =

Canadian physician

Maurice Généreux is a Canadian physician who was convicted in 1998 of prescribing medications to two HIV-positive men in Toronto, Ontario, Canada, in 1996 that allowed the men, Mark Jewitt and Aaron McGinn, to commit suicide. Généreux was the first doctor in North America to be convicted of assisting a suicide (followed in 1999 by Jack Kevorkian).

Mark Jewitt took a lethal dose but managed to survive after a friend found him and called emergency services. Aaron McGinn died in 1996 from an overdose of sleeping pills provided by Généreux. Généreux forged McGinn's death certificate to make it look as if McGinn had died from AIDS rather than from sleeping pills. The investigation into Généreux started when a friend raised doubts about McGinn's death to the chief coroner in Toronto. Following an investigation, Généreux was arrested on 20 June 1996.

Généreux was sent to prison for two years minus a day which would ensure he didn't go to a federal prison. He also lost his medical license.

According to Ian Dowbiggin, the author of A Concise History of Euthanasia, Généreux's actions revealed an "underground" network of euthanasia provision for AIDS sufferers in Toronto's gay community; however, Dowbiggin's assertions have not been proven. Aaron McGinn was HIV positive but he was not palliative and could have lived a long and healthy life with the medications available. Genereux's actions revealed a failure of the judicial system and The College of Physicians and Surgeons of Ontario (the self-regulating governing body for the province's medical profession). Généreux had previous convictions for sexually assaulting his patients but was allowed to continue practising medicine until his 1998 conviction.
