= Law on euthanasia and assisted suicide =

2009 Luxembourg law

The Law on euthanasia and assisted suicide (French: Loi sur l’euthanasie et l’assistance au suicide) is a law that came into force in 2009 in Luxembourg, legalising euthanasia and assisted suicide.

== Contents ==
The most important part of the law is the guarantee that doctors performing active euthanasia or assisting to commit suicide will not be liable to prosecution. The condition for this is that the patient should be terminally ill and in insufferable pain, and should voluntarily, deliberately and repeatedly confirm in writing their desire to end their own life. 16- to 18-year-olds may also request euthanasia if their parents or legal guardians consent. With patients who are not in a position to consent, a living will may suffice. Doctors must have several detailed conversations with the patient about their decision. They must also seek the opinion of a second doctor. All cases of euthanasia must be reviewed by a monitoring commission, which will contact a prosecutor if they find violations of the law.

The law used the Belgian Law on Euthanasia of 28 May 2002 as a model, and came into force on 17 March 2009 after its publication in the Grand Duchy's gazette, the Mémorial. Luxembourg was the third European Union member state and the third state worldwide to legalise euthanasia.

== Legislative history ==
The bill was introduced in the Chamber of Deputies by LSAP and Green members, and the Chamber approved the law at first reading on 19 February 2008 with 30 votes for, 26 against, and 3 abstentions. Before a law can come into force, its constitutionality must be reviewed by the Council of State. When this happened, the Council of State raised concerns due to legal uncertainties. It took the parliament until late 2008 to clear up these doubts. Finally, the law was approved again with 31 votes for, 26 against, and 3 abstentions on 18 December.

In addition, Grand-Duke Henri had announced his intention not to assent to the law for reasons of conscience. After Henri's refusal, the prime minister Jean-Claude Juncker agreed with all parties in the Chamber to enact a constitutional amendment which would strip the Grand-Duke of some of his power and would only leave him the right to promulgate laws – the word "approves" in Article 34 of the Constitution would be deleted. The Chamber approved this amendment at first reading with 56 votes for and one abstention on 11 December 2008. A petition against the amendment failed on 11 February 2009 with only 796 rather than the necessary 25,000 signatures, and on 12 March all the 52 Deputies who were present approved the law at second reading. The Grand-Duke, who had to assent to a law for the last time, did so. Thus, the euthanasia law was promulgated with the signatures of the Grand-Duke and Health Minister Mars Di Bartolomeo.
