= Euthanasia and assisted suicide in Canada =

Euthanasia or assisted suicide is legal in Canada under certain circumstances. Its legal form is called medical assistance in dying (abbreviated as MAiD or MAID). Under federal law, the practice cannot be administered as a result of any outside influence or pressure. A minimum 90-day assessment is conducted before determining eligibility with numerous other procedural safeguards also in place.

MAID first became legal for those whose death is reasonably foreseeable, effective in June 2016. In March 2021, the law was further amended by Bill C-7 to include those suffering from a grievous and irremediable condition whose death is not reasonably foreseeable. The possible inclusion of people with mental illnesses is controversial and has been repeatedly delayed. The legality of this postponement to 2027 is being challenged in court.

In 2024, 16,499 MAID provisions were reported, accounting for 5.1% of all deaths in Canada. As of November 2025 there had been about 76,000 MAID deaths reported in Canada since the introduction of legislation in 2016.

== Background ==
Euthanasia was previously prohibited under the Criminal Code as a form of culpable homicide. The prohibition was overturned in a February 2015 decision by the Supreme Court of Canada in Carter v Canada (Attorney General), which ruled that the Criminal Code provisions that make it a crime to help a person end their life violate the Canadian Charter of Rights and Freedoms and that eligible adults with grievous and irremediable medical conditions are entitled to an assisted death. The Court delayed its suspension of invalidity for a period of 12 months, to allow Parliament the opportunity to amend its laws if it so chose.

In January 2016, the Court granted an additional four-month extension to the suspension to allow for further time. As an interim measure, it ruled that provincial courts can now begin approving applications for euthanasia pursuant to the criteria in the Carter decision. On 6 June 2016, the suspension of invalidity expired and the law was struck down. On 17 June 2016, a bill to legalize and regulate euthanasia passed in Canada's Parliament. Canada's current law makes euthanasia available only to residents eligible for Canadian healthcare coverage.

The previous law's requirement that a natural death must be reasonably foreseeable and that the medical condition be grievous and irremediable medical condition had been controversial for how it limited the original Supreme Court of Canada ruling, mandating that euthanasia be made available to all adults with grievous and irremediable medical conditions. The British Columbia Civil Liberties Association (BCCLA) challenged the constitutionality of the previous law because it excluded people with long-term disabilities and those with "curable" medical conditions whose only treatment options people may find unacceptable. The BCCLA argued these medical conditions should qualify under the court's definition of grievous and irremediable. The BC Supreme Court and the Quebec Supreme Court in Truchon ruled in 2019 that the law could not limit euthanasia only to individuals whose death was reasonably foreseeable.

The current law prohibits mental illnesses as being considered as a grievous and irremediable condition. This prohibition was initially set to expire on 17 March 2023. On 2 February 2023, the Canadian government introduced legislation to extend the temporary exclusion of eligibility in circumstances where a person's sole underlying medical condition is a mental illness for a period of one-year, until 17 March 2024. In 2024, this was further delayed until 2027. After this date, persons with a mental illness can be eligible for medical assistance in dying, subject to any further amendments to the law or any new regulations.

Canada's euthanasia law includes some legal safeguards aimed at preventing abuse and ensuring informed consent. Neither the legal witness nor the physicians involved can have any legal or financial interest in the outcomes of the patient. Consent must be repeatedly expressed, not implied, including in the moment right before death. Consent can be revoked at any time, in any manner. There are no consequences for backing out and there are no limits to how often it can be requested. Doctors are permitted to suggest euthanasia to patients, regardless of whether the patient has already said that they do not want it.

To receive euthanasia, patients experiencing disease, disability or terminal illness must sign a written request expressing their wish to end their life in front of one independent witness who can confirm it was done willingly free of coercion. Next, two physicians and/or nurse practitioners must independently confirm their written agreement that the patient has an incurable grievous and irremediable medical condition that is in an advanced state of irreversible decline, and that the patient is capable of receiving and willing to receive euthanasia. If their death is not reasonably foreseeable, a medical expert in the underlying medical condition must sign off on the request, their assessment must take at least 90 days, and they must be informed about and decline all other forms of treatment, including palliative care.

Canada's law is consistent with many other nations that allow euthanasia in requiring at least two physicians to confirm the details of a diagnosis. Canada's law no longer requires the presence of a terminal illness, unlike many other countries where euthanasia is only legal in those circumstances. Canada's law is more restrictive than those of Belgium and the Netherlands in that it does not permit minors access to euthanasia. Canada does not yet allow it on the grounds of mental illness, a practice allowed in the Netherlands, Belgium, and Switzerland, until at least 17 March 2027.

Canada's law is less restrictive in that it does not require a patient to have exhausted all other treatment options, unlike Belgium and the Netherlands. While Belgium allows advanced directives in all circumstances, such advance directives in Canada may only be used if the patient's death is reasonably foreseeable. Canada is the only country that allows nurses to administer the drugs used for euthanasia.

According to The Atlantic, "[t]he law currently states that any sign of [patient] refusal [of MAID under an advance directive] 'must be respected'; at the same time, if the clinician determines that expressions of resistance are 'behavioural symptoms' of a patient's illness, and not necessarily an actual objection to receiving MAID, the euthanasia can continue anyway."

On 18 March 2026, Alberta Minister of Justice Mickey Amery introduced Bill 18, or the Safeguards for Last Resort Termination of Life Act, to the Legislative Assembly of Alberta. The bill would prevent doctors or nurse practitioners from administering MAID to patients whose sole underlying condition is mental illness. The bill, supported by Alberta Premier Danielle Smith, would make Alberta the first Canadian jurisdiction to place these types of limitations on federally permitted assisted deaths.

=== Carter v Canada (Attorney General) decision ===
In June 2012, in a case filed by Gloria Taylor, the Supreme Court of British Columbia ruled that provisions in the Criminal Code prohibiting euthanasia were unconstitutional as they apply to severely disabled patients capable of giving consent. The lower court ruled that the Criminal Code provisions "infringe s. 7 [and s. 15] of the Charter, and are of no force and effect to the extent that they prohibit physician-assisted suicide by a medical practitioner in the context of a physician–patient relationship". The court found that the relevant sections were legislatively overbroad, had a disproportionate effect on people with disabilities, and was "grossly disproportionate to the objectives it is meant to accomplish."

The case reached the Supreme Court of Canada in Carter v Canada (Attorney General). The court ruled that the law banning euthanasia of terminally ill patients (based on the Rodriguez v British Columbia (Attorney General) decision) was unconstitutional, and violated Section 7 of the Canadian Charter of Rights and Freedoms. The Supreme Court issued a 12-month suspended declaration of invalidity.

As a result of the decision, euthanasia was expected to be made legal for "a competent adult person who (1) clearly consents to the termination of life and (2) has a grievous and irremediable medical condition (including an illness, disease or disability) that causes enduring suffering that is intolerable to the individual in the circumstances of his or her condition". The court decision includes a requirement that there must be stringent limits that are "scrupulously monitored". This will require the death certificate to be completed by an independent medical examiner, not the treating physician, to ensure the accuracy of reporting the cause of death.

=== Bill C-14 ===
Euthanasia and assisted suicide in Canada

Parliament of Canada
- Long title: An Act to amend the Criminal Code and to make related amendments to other Acts (medical assistance in dying)
- Citation: S.C. 2016, c. 3
- Enacted by: Parliament of Canada
- Royal assent: 17 June 2016

Legislative history
- Bill citation: C-14, 42nd Parliament, 1st Session
- Introduced by: Jody Wilson-Raybould
- First reading: 14 April 2016
- Second reading: 4 May 2016
- Third reading: 31 May 2016
- First reading: 31 May 2016
- Second reading: 3 June 2016
- Third reading: 15 June 2016

As required by the 2015 Supreme Court decision, Justice Minister Jody Wilson-Raybould tabled a bill in parliament in April 2016 to amend the Criminal Code to allow euthanasia. Bill C-14 "create[s] exemptions from the offences of culpable homicide, of aiding suicide and of administering a noxious thing, in order to permit medical practitioners and nurse practitioners to provide medical assistance in dying and to permit pharmacists and other persons to assist in the process". The bill restricted euthanasia only to mentally competent adults with "enduring and intolerable suffering" and in cases where death is reasonably foreseeable. It also mandated a 15-day reflection period.

After the House of Commons passed Bill C-14 that would allow for euthanasia, it was debated in the Senate in mid-June 2016. Initially, that chamber amended the bill, expanding eligibility for euthanasia. When it became apparent that the elected House of Commons would not accept the amendment, a final vote was held on 18 June. At that time, a majority agreed with the restrictive wording provided by the House of Commons indicating that "only patients suffering from an incurable illness whose natural death is 'reasonably foreseeable' are eligible for a medically assisted death", as summarized by the Toronto Star.

Some opponents to the law indicate that the Carter v Canada (AG) decision was broader, including desperately ill individuals and not only those who are terminally ill or near death. The House of Commons did accept a few Senate amendments, such as requiring that patients be counseled about alternatives including palliative care and barring beneficiaries from acting in the euthanasia. Senators such as Serge Joyal who disagree with the restrictive wording believe that the provinces should refer the issue to the Supreme Court of Canada for an opinion in order to preclude the need for individuals to proceed with such an Appeal and incur the significant expense of doing so.

There was also a debate on the issue of suicide in Indigenous communities with MP Robert-Falcon Ouellette (Liberal) voting against the government on C-14. Ouellette believes that large-scale changes to social norms like euthanasia should move very slowly because the impacts will be felt differently across Canada and societies.

=== Truchon v Attorney General of Canada ===
On 11 September 2019, the Superior Court of Quebec declared that restricting euthanasia to those whose death is reasonably foreseeable violated the Charter's guarantee to "life, liberty, and security of the person" as well as the Charter's guarantee of "equal protection" under the law. The ruling declared the reasonably foreseeable clause in the federal euthanasia legislation to be unconstitutional. Neither the Attorney General of Canada or the Attorney General of Quebec appealed the decision.

=== Bill C-7 ===
The federal government passed Bill C-7 on 17 March 2021. The new legislation distinguished two "tracks" for assisted death. Under Track 1, the legislation relaxed or eliminated some of the safeguards for patients whose deaths were reasonably foreseeable, notably removing the 15-day waiting period, requiring only a single independent witness, and removing the requirement to offer palliative care. The legislation also introduced a new avenue, Track 2, for those whose death was not reasonably foreseeable to access euthanasia—conditional on the approval of medical practitioner who specialized in the underlying condition; a 90-day assessment period; and ensuring "serious consideration" by applicants of "reasonable and available means" of treatment.

The legislation included a sunset clause that would allow people with mental illnesses to be eligible for euthanasia two years after the legislation passed. This clause has been particularly controversial due to the perceived difficulty of receiving informed consent from individuals suffering from a mental illness, particularly when the mental illness is already associated with suicide ideation. However, multiple studies show that the majority of people with mental illnesses do not lack the mental competence or the capacity to make treatment-related decisions. This expansion in access to medical assistance in dying was originally planned for March 2023 before being postponed by one year, to 17 March 2024. It was further postponed to 2027.

A panel was established by the government to study potential issues and safeguards with implementing medical assistance in dying for people whose sole medical condition was a mental illness. A report of this process was given to parliament on 6 May 2022. The panel had nineteen recommendations that could be implemented without amending the Criminal Code. Some arguments addressed to the panel suggested that there was no evidence that safeguards and protocols could be adequate and thus the panel's mandate could not be fulfilled. The panel concluded that despite these uncertainties, people could still voluntarily wish to request medical assistance in dying and thus its mandate could be fulfilled.

One member of the panel, Ellen Cohen, resigned for ethical reasons. Cohen believes that the issues faced by those in poverty or seeking housing was not adequately considered by the rest of the panel. A person can simultaneously seek medical assistance in dying while waiting for other treatments. Proponents of including mentally ill patients regard the delays as discriminatory. Opponents are sceptical that mental illness is irremediable or concerned about endangering vulnerable individuals.

In 2024, a lawsuit about the legality of delaying expansion of euthanasia to those with a mental disorder was filed due to the belief that denying it on these grounds is discriminatory and violates the Charter of Rights and Freedoms. A separate charter challenge was also filed in 2024, on the grounds that the Track 2 criteria cause premature deaths of disabled people and euthanasia should be limited to those with reasonably foreseeable deaths.

== Statistics ==
There have been 76,475 MAID deaths reported in Canada since the introduction of legislation in 2016. In 2024, 16,499 MAID provisions were reported in Canada, accounting for 5.1% of all deaths in Canada. In 2024, The median age of MAID recipients was 77.9 years.

In 2022, the underlying medical conditions included cancer (63%), cardiovascular (18.8%), other at 14.9% (can be frailty, diabetes, chronic pain, autoimmune), respiratory (13.2%), and neurological conditions (12.6%). 75% of MAID recipients received palliative care and of the MAID recipients who required, but did not receive, palliative care 80.5% had access, a level similar to the three previous years.

	NL	PE	NS	NB	QC	ON	MB	SK	AB	BC	YT	NT	NU	Canada
2016	–	–	24	9	494	191	24	11	63	194	–	–	–	1,018
2017	–	–	62	47	853	839	63	57	205	677	–	–	–	2,838
2018	23	8	126	92	1,249	1,500	138	85	307	951	12	–	–	4,493
2019	20	20	147	141	1,604	1,788	177	97	377	1,280	13	–	–	5,665
2020	49	37	190	160	2,278	2,378	214	160	555	1,572	13	–	–	7,611
2021	65	41	245	205	3,299	3,102	245	247	594	2,030	16	–	–	10,092
2022	90	44	274	247	4,801	3,934	223	257	836	2,515	16	–	–	13,241
2023	72	44	359	299	5,601	4,644	227	344	977	2,759	x	–	–	15,343
2024	108	57	445	283	5,998	4,994	186	341	1,117	2,997	14	–	–	16,499
Total 2016–2024														76,475

== Reception ==
Before euthanasia was made legal in Quebec in June 2014, the Quebec College of Physicians had declared that it was prepared to cross the line on the debate over euthanasia and proposed that it be included as part of the appropriate care in certain particular circumstances. The Canadian Medical Association (CMA) describes euthanasia as "one of the most complex and ethically challenging issues facing Canadian physicians". Before the legalization of euthanasia, the organization stated that it is not up to them to decide on the issue of euthanasia, but the responsibility of society. The organization also reported that not all doctors were willing to help a terminally-ill patient die.

A 2015 survey indicated that 29% of Canadian doctors surveyed would consider providing euthanasia while 63% would refuse. However, the belief in late 2015 was that no physician would be forced to do so. The extent of conscientious objection to providing euthanasia continues to be debated on issues such as whether objecting physicians must refer patients to a doctor who is willing to provide euthanasia and whether institutions have a right to refuse to provide euthanasia services; at present doctors are required to make effective referrals. Catholic hospitals often refuse to provide healthcare that goes against the institution's tenets, such as abortion or euthanasia.

A 2023 survey by the Angus Reid Institute showed 61% of Canadians supported the current version of the legislation, while 31% supported extending euthanasia to mental disorders. A poll conducted by Leger in the summer of 2022 regarding further liberalization of Canada's euthanasia laws found that 51% of Canadians supported expanding euthanasia to mature minors, with 23% opposed and 26% being unsure. 65% supported advanced directives in the face of a worsening cognitive condition, with 14% opposed and 22% being unsure. 45% supported expanding eligibility for euthanasia to include individuals with serious mental illnesses, with 23% opposed and 32% being unsure of their position.

== Criticism ==
In 2021, the United Nations Human Rights Council's special rapporteur on the rights of persons with disabilities criticized Bill C-7 and assisted death in general, for undermining both disabled people's equal right to live and their ability to autonomously access support to continue living. In 2025, a UN report recommended disqualifying non-terminal patients from being eligible for euthanasia. An estimated 25% of disabled Canadian adults live in poverty. Money available through social programs differs across provinces, but is often below the poverty threshold: New Brunswick offers the least at $705 per month and Alberta offers the most at $1,685 per month.

In an August 2023 paper, Medical Assistance in Dying, Palliative Care, Safety, and Structural Vulnerability, the authors argued that while socioeconomic deprivation drives mortality to a large degree, it does not drive medical assistance in dying to any substantial degree. Another 2023 paper, The Realities of Medical Assistance in Dying in Canada, concluded that "The Canadian MAiD regime is lacking the safeguards, data collection, and oversight necessary to protect Canadians against premature death." A 2025 paper concluded that Track 2 MAID recipients in the province of Ontario exhibited similar patterns to Track 1 MAID recipients in terms of economic dependency and situational vulnerability, and that their income did not significantly differ from decedents who died naturally according to socioeconomic data of MAID recipients from the Office of the Chief Coroner for Ontario.

In certain cases, family members are not informed that their relative has died through MAID, as individuals have a right to medical privacy. While standard reviews of MAID cases may be conducted, Canada's process has been criticized for lacking regional panels and oversight processes that other countries with legal euthanasia provide.

=== Impact on the impoverished ===
After the repeal of the reasonably foreseeable requirement in Bill C-7, writers for The Spectator, Jacobin, and Global News have argued that many might opt into euthanasia because of poverty. Critics believe that a lack of social spending structurally places these people in poverty, and then introduces MAID as a way out, citing issues like insufficient welfare for disabled people and unconstitutionally long waiting times for healthcare as evidence that those who are disabled and impoverished do not have enough support to survive.

An analysis piece from The Spectator, their most popular article in 2022, argued that the Canadian government sees MAID as a more economical alternative to investments in social programs and welfare. The Canadian Parliamentary Budget Officer released a report claiming the old MAID policies will save Canada $86.9 million per year and that Bill C-7 will save an additional $62 million per year. There have also been intersectional issues raised with MAID relating to higher rates of poverty in marginalized communities, lack of social support, and ableism and racism in the medical community.

=== Ableism and equality concerns ===
Bill C-7 has been criticized as discriminatory towards disabled people. A letter from the United Nations Human Rights Council's Special Rapporteur on the rights of persons with disabilities, the Independent Expert on the enjoyment of all human rights by older persons, and the Special Rapporteur on extreme poverty on human rights raised concerns that the bill would not adhere to "international human rights standards". They believe that the bill potentially violates the right to life of disabled people, that provisions of the bill are not consistent with Canada's obligation to equality and non-discrimination, and that the bill perpetuates negative stereotypes about disabilities.

In a paper from August 2023 authored by a member of the law faculty at the University of British Columbia, Legislated Ableism: Bill C-7 and the Rapid Expansion of MAiD in Canada, the author argues that the expansion of MAID through Bill C-7 conflicts with the Canadian constitution, violating s.7 and s.15, which pertain to equal protection under law and anti-discrimination.

=== Handling of specific cases ===
In addition to broader criticism of MAID, the handling of certain cases have been subject to media coverage. These include:

- In 2017, the mother of a young woman with various medical conditions including cerebral palsy, spina bifida and chronic seizure disorder said she was told by a doctor that not considering MAID was "selfish". She said her daughter was in the room when the conversation took place and described the experience as traumatic.
- In 2018, Roger Foley was being treated for cerebellar ataxia at an Ontario hospital. Foley alleged that his only options were to be forcibly discharged from the hospital and then treated by an organization that had previously failed to provide him adequate care or apply for MAID. Foley hired a lawyer for a charter challenge. In 2024, his lawsuit against this hospital was dismissed with the presiding judge noting "It makes very serious allegations in the form of bare conclusions, without pleading material facts to support those allegations" as well as "These submissions were irrelevant and ... also betray the fundamentally political nature of many of Mr. Foley's complaints."
- In 2019, Alan Nichols successfully applied for MAID while being hospitalized for suicide ideation. The reason given on his application was hearing loss.
- In September 2021, Rosina Kamis, a 41-year-old Malaysian-born woman, applied for MAID citing fibromyalgia as the reason. However, in conversations and recordings shared with friends, she mentioned financial hardship and social isolation as additional factors influencing her decision.
- In February 2022, an anonymous Torontonian suffering from extreme chemical sensitivity syndrome with the pseudonym Sophia had a medically assisted death after failing to find affordable housing that was free from tobacco smoke and other chemicals. This case was addressed by her health care provider in testimony provided to the Special Joint Committee on MAID, and was referenced in their final report.
- In October 2022, a man from St. Catharines applied for MAID when facing homelessness. After receiving $60,000 from a GoFundMe campaign, he was able to find a place to live and withdrew his application.
- In November 2022, an anonymous active Canadian Forces member has alleged he was offered MAID when seeking assistance regarding PTSD and suicidal thoughts.
- In December 2022, Paralympian and veteran Christine Gauthier testified that a Veterans Affairs Canada employee offered her MAID as an option when she was fighting for the installation of a wheelchair lift or ramp at her house. Subsequently, VAC claimed they found no record that MAID was offered as an option to Gauthier and that it found four such cases, all involving a single now-suspended case manager.
- In August 2022, Vancouver Coastal Health asked patients seeking mental healthcare for suicidal ideation if they would like to consider MAID, which the patients experienced as undermining their access to suicide prevention care; the hospital stated the suggestion was a method of assessing suicide risk.
- In February 2024, a 27-year old woman with autism was scheduled for euthanasia in Alberta. Her father sought a temporary injunction through the justice system to prevent her death. The injunction was initially granted, but the father later dropped his appeal.

== See also ==
- Euthanasia Prevention Coalition
- Suicide legislation
- Maurice Généreux – Canadian physician that was convicted for providing assisted suicide
- R v Latimer – murder trial in which the defendant claimed that the murder was a mercy killing
