= Mike Wood (businessman) =

American lawyer and business executive (1952–2025)

- Born: Michael Carleton Wood; September 1, 1952; Willits, California, U.S.
- Died: April 10, 2025 (aged 72); Zurich, Switzerland
- Education: Stanford University (B.A.); Haas School of Business (M.B.A.); UC Law San Francisco (J.D.)
- Occupations: Lawyer; business executive
- Years active: 1978–c. 2006
- Spouse: Susan Cotter (m. 1985, divorced) Leslie Harlander (m. 2021)
- Children: 1

Michael Carleton Wood (September 1, 1952 – April 10, 2025) was an American lawyer and business executive. He was possibly best known as the founder of the educational entertainment and electronics company LeapFrog Enterprises, where his tenure lasted from 1995 until 2004.

== Early life and education ==
Michael Carleton Wood was born one of three children of Michael Webster Wood and Anne (née Mathewson) Wood in Willits, California, on September 1, 1952, and was raised in Orinda, east of Berkeley.

Wood graduated from Miramonte High School and earned a bachelor of arts degree from Stanford University in 1974. He earned a Master of Business Administration degree from the Haas School of Business and a Juris Doctor degree from UC Law San Francisco (then the University of California Hastings College of the Law).

== Career ==
=== Private law practice ===
From 1978 until 1991, Wood practiced corporate law at Reed Smith, and from 1991 until 1994, he was a partner at Cooley LLP in San Francisco.

=== Business career ===
After quitting his position at Cooley, Wood founded LeapFrog Enterprises in 1995. LeapFrog Enterprises introduced the LeapPad in 1999. The company's first product, Phonics Desk, was launched in 1995.

Knowledge Universe, founded by Michael Milken and Larry Ellison, bought a majority stake in LeapFrog in 1997. As a result of the purchase, LeapFrog merged with the Knowledge Universe division Knowledge Kids Enterprises in October 1997. With the money from the purchase, Wood acquired a company that had developed the prototype of LeapPad, pushing its founders to develop the technology.

LeapFrog's stock was made available to the public on July 25, 2002. Though it soared almost 99 percent in the process, it was the best-performing IPO of 2002.

Wood was the chief executive officer of LeapFrog from March 2002 until February 2004, and the vice chairman from September 1997 until his retirement on September 1, 2004. At the time of his retirement from LeapFrog in September 2004, Wood had a salary of $265,000 as vice chairman, chief vision officer and chief creative officer and owned 2.7 million shares of LeapFrog's stock, worth around $54 million at the time. He later founded the educational entertainment company SmartyAnts in San Rafael, California, in 2006. Wood also served on the board of Sangamo Therapeutics.

=== Later career ===
After his tenure at SmartyAnts, Wood worked as a volunteer reading teacher at a school near his residence in Mill Valley, California, where more than half of his students were classified as socioeconomically disadvantaged by the state of California.

== Personal life and death ==
Wood married Susan Cotter in 1985, with whom he had a son, Mat. They later divorced and Wood married Leslie Harlander in 2021.

Wood had Alzheimer's disease and died by assisted suicide in Zürich, surrounded by his family on April 10, 2025, at the age of 72.

== Honors ==
In August 2024, Wood was named a candidate for the 2025 Living Induction into the Toy Industry Hall of Fame by the Toy Association.
