= Ana Estrada =

Peruvian euthanasia activist (1976–2024)

Ana Milagros Estrada Ugarte
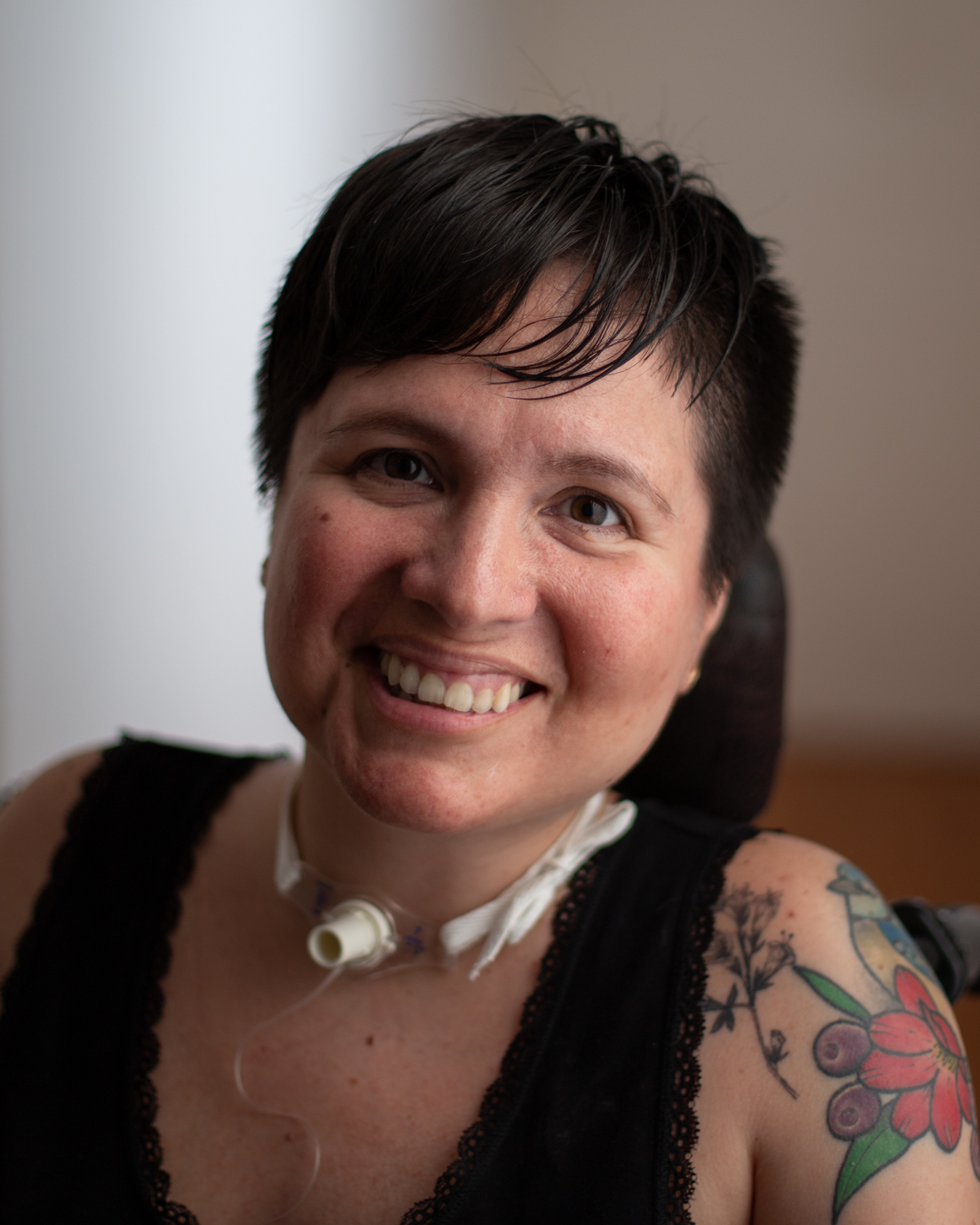
- Estrada in 2020
- Born: 20 November 1976
- Died: 21 April 2024 (aged 47)
- Education: Pontifical Catholic University of Peru
- Occupations: Psychologist and right to die activist
- Known for: Euthanasia activism
- Website: anabuscalamuertedigna.wordpress.com

Ana Milagros Estrada Ugarte (20 November 1976 – 21 April 2024) was a Peruvian psychologist and right to die activist.

== Biography ==
At the age of 12, Estrada was diagnosed with polymyositis, an uncommon inflammatory disease that causes muscle weakness. Later in her life, Estrada completed her studies at the Pontifical Catholic University of Peru before being determined paralyzed and having to use a wheelchair. In 2015, Estrada's health declined and she had to be admitted for pneumonia in intensive care at Rebagliati Hospital, leaving her bedridden which caused her to become depressed. She underwent a tracheostomy and a gastrostomy, which meant that she had to be constantly intubated in order to breathe, drink, and eat.

=== Euthanasia request ===
Around 2019, Estrada requested to be euthanized as a result of pain caused by her illness, but her request was denied due to euthanasia being classified as a crime in Peru under murder. Estrada set up a petition on Change.org in order to legalize euthanasia in Peru and to allow herself to "die with dignity". "For me, having a dignified life means having freedom, autonomy, and the ability to make decisions about yourself," Estrada said. "I want to have control over my time, my body, and the power to choose when to die, because it's about the freedom to choose."

On 25 February 2021, the Eleventh Constitutional Court of Peru declared that euthanasia did not classify as murder and ordered the Ministry of Justice and Ministry of Health to respect her decision. The decision was later ratified by the Supreme Court of Peru.

=== Death ===
Estrada became the first person in Peru to die by euthanasia on 21 April 2024, at the age of 47. She "died on her own terms, in accordance with her idea of dignity and in full control of her autonomy until the end," according to a statement released by her family. "Ana's legacy will live in the minds and hearts of many people and in the history of our country," the family statement said.

== See also ==
- List of deaths from legal euthanasia and assisted suicide
