= Luis Montes Mieza =

Luis Montes
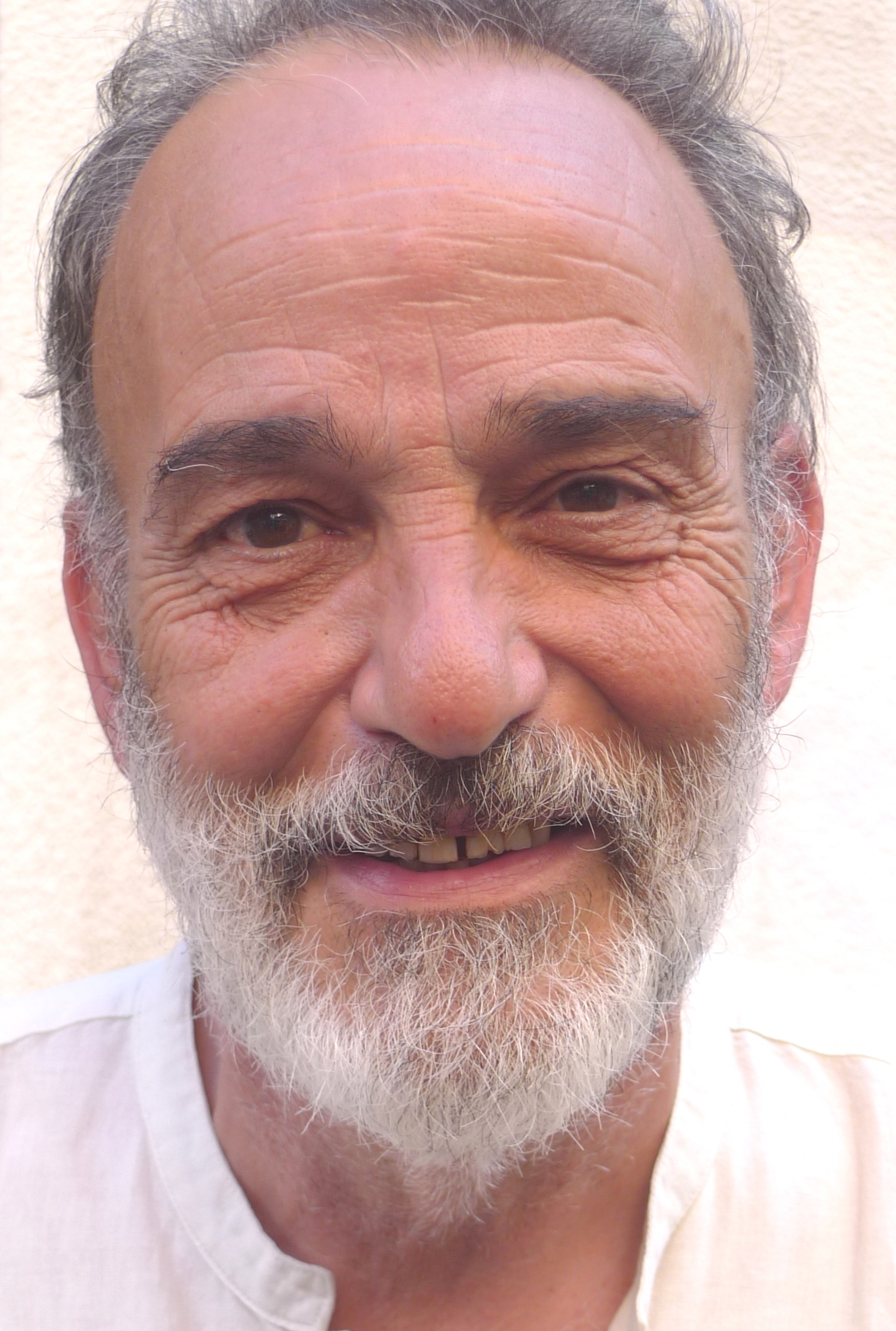
- Luis Montes in 2011
- Born: 1949; Villarino de los Aires, Spain
- Died: 19 April 2018 (aged 68–69); Murcia, Spain
- Education: Complutense University of Madrid
- Occupations: Anesthetist; Activist
- Years active: 1987–2018
- Employer: Severo Ochoa Hospital of Leganés
- Known for: Accused of homicide by giving "dignified death" to terminally ill patients. First Spanish Law of Dignified Death approved thanks to him.
- Political party: Podemos

Luis Montes Mieza (1949 – 19 April 2018), was a Spanish anesthetist and pro-euthanasia activist. He was the Federal President of the association "Derecho a Morir Dignamente" from 2009 till his death.

== Academic and professional biography ==
Montes had a degree in Medicine from the Complutense University of Madrid. In 1987 he joined as an anesthesiologist in the recently created Hospital Severo Ochoa of Leganés, of which he was Director and, since 2000, Emergency Coordinator of the Hospital, a position he held until 2005. At the time of his death, he was a physician in the Emergency Department of the Severo Ochoa Hospital in Leganés.

== Leganés case ==
=== Complaint of the Regional Ministry of Health of the Community of Madrid against Luis Montes and Miguel Ángel López - Dismissed ===
In May 2005 Luis Montes Mieza and Miguel Ángel López Varas were investigated by the Health Department of the Community of Madrid, by Manuel Lamela Fernández, because of two anonymous denunciations in which they were accused of sedations in high doses in terminally ill patients in the Emergency Service of the Severo Ochoa Hospital that he coordinated. According to press reports, at that time the deaths in the emergency room of Severo Ochoa tripled percentage of the average of the other hospitals in Madrid. The report presented by the Regional Ministry of Health identified 73 cases of sedation performed incorrectly between 1 September 2003 and 8 March 2005. In 2005, Montes Mieza was dismissed as coordinator at the request of Lamela. According to press reports, after the dismissal of Montes as Director of the Severo Ochoa Emergency Department, deaths in the service were halved. In January 2008, the court closed the case ratifying the dismissal that already in the month of June 2007 had determined and suppressed the legal basis that refers to the malpractice of the defendants. The courts concluded that the causes of deaths in the cases analyzed were not can certainly be attributed to the sedation, so the accusation was not proven, which does not mean that the Court had ruled the absence of malpractice.

=== Complaint by Luis Montes and Miguel Ángel López against the Evaluation Commission - Dismissal ===
On 28 January 2009, Luis Montes Mieza and Miguel Ángel López filed a complaint - admitted for processing - for false accusation and falsehood against Manuel Lamela Fernández and the six doctors who signed the report with which he was accused of incriminating - Isidro Álvarez Martín, of the Regional Ministry of Health; Hernán Cortés-Funes, of Hospital 12 de Octubre; Manuel Gómez Barón, of Hospital Universitario La Paz; DoloreS Crespo Hervás, of Hospital Ramón y Cajal; Francisco López Timoneda, of Hospital Clínico de Madrid and Bartolomé Bonet Serra, of the Hospital de Alcorcón-. In April 2011 the chief of the Court of Instruction Number 43 of Madrid agreed on the "free dismissal and the file" of the complaint.

=== Luis Montes's complaint against Miguel Ángel Rodríguez for insults - Conviction ===
In April 2011, the sentence condemning Miguel Ángel Rodríguez, former spokesman of the government of José María Aznar, was convicted to pay 30,000 euros as the author of a "continuing offense of serious injury with advertising" against Luis Montes Mieza.

== Federal Presidency of the Right to Die Dignity association ==
From 2009 until his death in 2018, Luis Montes was the Federal President of the association Right to Dignify Dignity, an association that defends the decriminalization of euthanasia, universal access to palliative care hospital and extra-hospital, to sedation, the implantation and diffusion of the living will, and the right to the autonomy of the patient, as well as respect for his will and individual freedom.

In 2011 the government of José Luis Rodríguez Zapatero, by Minister of Health, Leire Pajín, promoted in Congress of Deputies a national law on dignified death (under the name of the Law Regulating the Rights of the Person before the Final Process of Life) that could not be processed before the end of the legislature in November 2011, with the aim of regulating at national level much of what is included in the territorial laws on which it was inspired and which aim to provide legal security for professionals and guarantees for patients and family members within the framework of medical praxis. Parliaments of Andalusia, Aragón and Navarra approved same laws.

== Death ==
Montes died on 19 April 2018, of a heart attack, while driving to Molina de Segura (Region of Murcia).
