= Noelia Castillo euthanasia case =

2026 intentional death of Spanish woman

Noelia Castillo
- Castillo in 2026, in her final interview
- Born: Noelia Castillo Ramos; 14 November 2000; Barcelona, Catalonia, Spain
- Died: 26 March 2026 (aged 25); Sant Pere de Ribes, Catalonia, Spain
- Cause of death: Euthanasia

Noelia Castillo Ramos (14 November 2000 – 26 March 2026) was a Spanish woman who died after receiving euthanasia. Her request for euthanasia became a landmark case in Spain on the application of the Organic Law Regulating Euthanasia in the country. At age 25, she was one of the youngest people to receive medical assistance in dying after demonstrating chronic and irreversible pain. Her case garnered significant public attention due to a two-year legal battle, in which the High Court of Justice of Catalonia (TSJC) had to intervene to validate her right against appeals filed by her father and the Christian Lawyers Association, who questioned her legal capacity.

== Background ==
When Castillo was 13, her parents lost their home, and she initially lived with her father. Her mental health suffered due to her parents' separation, and she alleged that she had to accompany her father to bars until the early hours of the morning. Castillo was diagnosed with obsessive–compulsive disorder (OCD) and borderline personality disorder (BPD). She was taken into social care, and was there from July 2015 to February 2019, when she voluntarily left as a legal adult.

Castillo stated in an interview that she suffered from three incidents of sexual assault that she did not report and therefore were not officially investigated or judicially confirmed: one from an ex-partner, a second by a group of two males at a nightclub, and a third also at a nightclub by a group of three males.

On 4 October 2022, several days after the second group assault, Castillo attempted suicide by jumping from a building. Castillo survived, but the incident left her with irreversible paraplegia, accompanied by chronic physical pain, neurological damage, and severe psychological suffering.

== Campaign ==
=== Legal request ===
Castillo formally requested euthanasia in April 2024, invoking the provisions of existing Spanish law. Her procedure was unanimously approved by the Guarantee and Evaluation Commission of Catalonia in July 2024 and was due to take place the next month.

The main obstacle was the opposition of her father, who, with the support of the Christian Lawyers Association (Asociación de Abogados Cristianos), initiated a series of legal appeals to halt the procedure. All courts rejected the request to stop the procedure and upheld Castillo's right to die. The father argued that his daughter could not make her own judgements due to her personality disorder, and that the state had a responsibility to protect her.

Despite having legal approval, the procedure was delayed for 601 days due to the protracted legal battle. In March 2025, her father's appeal was rejected by a court in Barcelona that found that Castillo was not incapable of making a decision on euthanasia.

An appeal to the High Court of Justice of Catalonia upheld the euthanasia in September 2025, but permitted an appeal to the Supreme Court of Spain. On 29 January 2026, the father's appeal was rejected by the Supreme Court, and his appeal to the Constitutional Court of Spain was dismissed as he did not specify how his human rights were violated. On 10 March 2026, the European Court of Human Rights (ECtHR) in Strasbourg, France rejected the father's final appeal.

In her final interview, broadcast on Antena 3's Y ahora Sonsoles on 25 March 2026, Castillo said that her decision to die was personal and she was not encouraging other people to request euthanasia.

=== Death ===
On 26 March 2026, Castillo, aged 25, underwent euthanasia at a healthcare centre in Sant Pere de Ribes in the Province of Barcelona. Her mother requested to be present in the room, but she chose to die alone.

Castillo was the third youngest person to receive euthanasia in Spain. Of the 1,123 people who had received euthanasia, two people, aged 22 and 23, were younger.

== Reactions ==
British concert pianist and writer James Rhodes, who lives in Spain and is a survivor of child sexual abuse, offered to pay for Castillo's mental and physical healthcare.

Castillo's euthanasia was debated in the Congress of Deputies. Politicians from parties including the Spanish Socialist Workers' Party, Republican Left of Catalonia, Galician Nationalist Bloc, EH Bildu and Sumar spoke in support. The People's Party and Vox criticised the decision.

Luis Argüello, archbishop of Valladolid and president of the Spanish Episcopal Conference of the Catholic Church, condemned the euthanasia. José Mazuelos Pérez, Bishop of the Canary Islands, said the outcome was "another step towards a culture of death, throwing in the towel on the humanisation of medicine." The bishops of the Subcommission for the Family and the Defence of Life said that the case exemplified "an accumulation of personal suffering and institutional shortcomings that calls the whole of society into question" (cf. Christianity and euthanasia).

== Misinformation ==
Castillo's father's lawyers said that they had information from a relative that she was gang raped by unaccompanied child migrants while in a care centre. This was then disseminated by Vox leader Santiago Abascal. Various fact-checking websites consider this to be misinformation: Castillo was 21 when she attempted suicide days after the group assault, and had left care over three years earlier. In her broadcast interview, she did not describe her assailants, and said the incidents happened at a nightclub.

Castillo's euthanasia was reported as being granted due to her having depression. This was not true: it was granted due to chronic and irreversible pain from her suicide attempt. Her father's lawyers also alleged that her euthanasia could not be suspended as her organs were already committed to donation, and that doctors had financial interests in the donation of her organs. However, the decisions to undergo euthanasia or to be an organ donor are independent and consent can be revoked at any time, and doctors are not paid more if a person undergoing euthanasia donates their organs.

== See also ==
- Euthanasia in Spain
