= Michelle Duncan =

Scottish actress (born 1978)

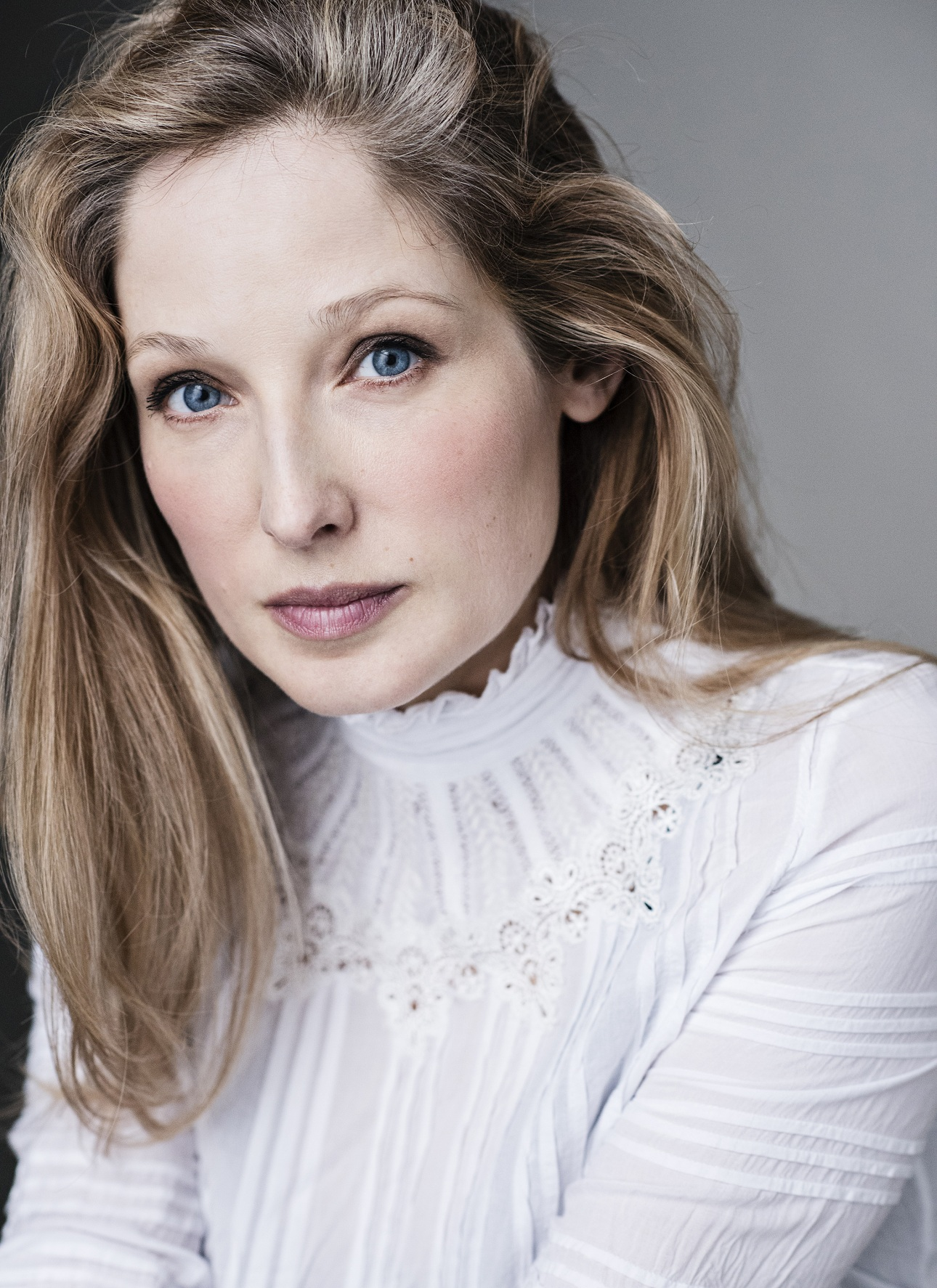
- Duncan in 2019
- Born: Michelle Duncan; 14 April 1978 (age 48); Perth, Scotland
- Education: Queen Margaret University; St Andrews University
- Occupation: Actress
- Years active: 1997–present

Michelle Duncan (born 14 April 1978) is a Scottish actress, known for films such as Driving Lessons (2006), Atonement (2007), The Broken (2008) and Bohemian Rhapsody (2018).

== Early life ==
Born and raised in Perth, Duncan studied and trained in acting at Queen Margaret University School of Drama before studying English and classics at St Andrews University. Duncan trained under Philippe Gaulier at École Philippe Gaulier.

== Career ==
Duncan's television roles include Sugar Rush, Doctor Who, Low Winter Sun, and Lost in Austen. She played Princess Diana in a TV film, Whatever Love Means, opposite Olivia Poulet as Camilla Parker Bowles and Laurence Fox as Prince Charles.

Her film work includes Atonement, The Broken, and as Rupert Grint's love interest in Driving Lessons with Julie Walters. Duncan's role in Atonement was particularly praised by The New Yorker theatre critic Anthony Lane: Duncan's stage work includes Time and the Conways (Bath Theatre Royal/ touring), A Midsummer Night's Dream and The Burning at the Edinburgh Festival Fringe.

Further television work includes a 2012 episode of New Tricks and a 2014 episode of Call the Midwife. In 2006, Duncan lent her voice to a puppetry adaptation of Hans Christian Andersen's The Little Mermaid at Little Angel Theatre.

In 2003, Duncan spent a season with Theatre Alba, appearing in the company's productions of The Burning and The Enchauntit Gairden.

In 2007 she was cast as Portia in The Merchant of Venice at Shakespeare's Globe, rehearsing through April and May, but was unable to continue after the previews and was replaced by Kirsty Besterman. In 2012 Duncan appeared alongside Amanda Hale in Scrubber, a film written and directed by Romola Garai. In 2013, Duncan appeared in the third series of the BBC TV drama Luther and Case Histories. In 2014, she appeared in the ITV drama Grantchester.

In 2015, she starred in the film Iona, the closing gala film of that year's Edinburgh Film Festival. She took the role of Bea (originally performed by Helen Baxendale) in Deborah Bruce's play The Distance, directed by Charlotte Gwinner, for Sheffield and the Orange Tree Theatres.

In 2017, she starred opposite Jamie Robson in Charlotte Wells' short film Blue Christmas. Then the following year, she played Shelley Stern in the Queen biopic Bohemian Rhapsody.

In 2022, Duncan was cast in Star Wars: Andor where she plays the role of Roboda Beehaz. In the same year, Duncan starred opposite Dougray Scott in the short film Slay and Prepare the Animal for Meat, directed by Oisin Kearney and written by Ciara Elizabeth Smyth.

In 2023, Viaplay announced that Duncan had been cast in the Rebus reboot series based on the crime novels of author Ian Rankin.

In 2025, she appeared as a main plot character in three episodes of Dept. Q, and in 2026 had a minor role in three episodes of Black Doves.

== Theatre ==
Year	Title	Role	Company	Theatre	Director	Notes
2003	The Burning	The Girl	Theatre Alba	Brunton Theatre, Musselburgh	Charles Nowosielski	play by Stewart Conn
2003	The Enchauntit Gairden	Princess Honeysuckle	Theatre Alba	Duddingston Kirk Gardens, Edinburgh	Charles Nowosielski	play by Charles Mackenzie

== Filmography ==
=== Film ===
Year	Title	Role	Notes
1997	Waterloo		Short film
2006	Driving Lessons	Bryony	
2006	Sucking Is a Fine Quality in Women and Vacuum Cleaners	The Wife	Short film
2006	Chôshû Faibu	Emily	
2007	Atonement	Fiona Maguire	
2008	The Broken	Kate Coleman	
2012	Scrubber	Neighbour	Short film
2015	Iona	Elizabeth	
2017	Blue Christmas	Lily	Short film
2018	Bohemian Rhapsody	Shelley Stern	

=== Television ===
Year	Title	Role	Notes
2000	Are You Afraid of the Dark?	Andrea	Episode: "The Tale of the Time Trap"
2005	Sea of Souls	Claire Morrison	2 episodes
2005	Sugar Rush	Miss Forbes	S1 Ep2
2005	Whatever Love Means	Princess Diana	TV movie
2006	Doctor Who	Lady Isobel	Episode: "Tooth and Claw"
2006	Low Winter Sun	Det Con Louise Cullen	TV movie
2008	Lost in Austen	Charlotte Lucas	2 episodes
2012	New Tricks	Georgia Wright	Episode: "The Girl Who Lived"
2013	Case Histories	Rachel Stewart	Episode: "Nobody's Darling"
2013	Luther	Kiera Mills	1 episode
2013	Call the Midwife	Jeanette Heckford	1 episode
2014	Grantchester	Annabel Morrison	
2019–21	Hanna	False Marissa	2 episodes
2019	Elizabeth is Missing	Mrs Palmer	TV movie
2021	Baptiste	Sally	
2022	Andor	Roboda Beehaz	Episode: "The Eye"
2023	Dalgliesh	Caroline Dupayne	Episode: "The Murder Room"
2025	Dept. Q	Dr Fiona Wallace	3 episodes
2026	Black Doves	Mrs. Conduct	3 episodes

== Awards and nominations ==
Year	Nominated work	Award	Category	Result	Ref.
2005	Sea of Souls	BAFTA Scotland	Best First-Time Performance	Nominated	
2008	Atonement	Gold Derby Awards	Best Ensemble Cast	Nominated	
