= Low Winter Sun =

Low Winter Sun may refer to:

- Low Winter Sun (British TV series), a 2006 British crime drama series.
- Low Winter Sun (American TV series), the 2013 American remake of the British series.
