= How Do You Solve a Problem Like Camilla? =

- The Queen episode

"How Do You Solve a Problem Like Camilla?" is an episode of the 2009 documentary drama The Queen which aired on Channel 4 in the United Kingdom. The episode centres on Queen Elizabeth II's understanding of her son Charles's relationship with Camilla Parker Bowles.

== Summary ==
The Queen (Diana Quick) is having a difficult time accepting Camilla Parker Bowles (Joanna Van Gyseghem) into the royal family. Prince Charles (Martin Turner) however declares the relationship with Camilla as non-negotiable. With time, the Queen accepts their relationship and marriage.

== Cast ==
- Diana Quick as Queen Elizabeth II
- Joanna Van Gyseghem as Camilla Parker Bowles
- Martin Turner as Prince Charles
- June Bailey as Queen Elizabeth the Queen Mother
- Rick Bacon as Mark Bolland
- Robert Ashby as King Constantine II of Greece
- Davyd Harries as Clergyman

== See also ==
- Whatever Love Means (2005 television movie)
