= Daniel Edwards =

American contemporary artist

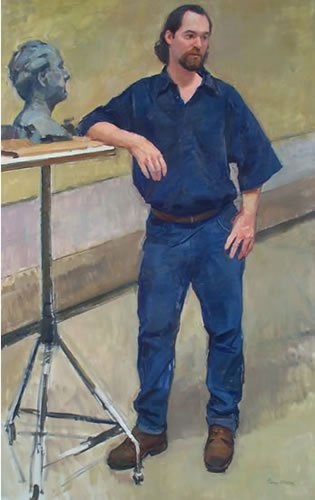
Jerry Weiss, Daniel Edward picture

Daniel Edwards (born 1965 in La Porte, Indiana) is an American contemporary artist whose pieces address celebrity and popular culture in ways that have often stirred controversy. The release of the pieces is generally accompanied by press releases. He includes the idea of promotion and associative fame in his own marketing of his art.

His works include a sculpture of the disembodied head of Ted Williams, a life-sized statue of Britney Spears giving birth while nude on her hands and knees on a bearskin rug, a bust of Senator Hillary Clinton, and a 25-foot (7.6 m) bust of Fidel Castro.

== Works ==
=== Britney Spears ===
Daniel Edwards' sculpture of Britney Spears giving birth

Edwards titled the piece Monument to Pro-Life: The Birth of Sean Preston, explaining that it symbolized Spears' decision to put childbirth ahead of her career. Britney Spears actually had a caesarean section.

In an Associated Press interview, Edwards asserted that he incorporates celebrity stories because:

You're bombarded with these stories. And there's a thread that winds back to the art. That's not a bad thing. People are interested in sex, and it works for art as well.

Edwards conceded, however, that he wouldn't march with either anti-abortion or abortion rights advocates.

A number of the images shown in the media are casts of the sculpture rather than the original. Casts can be distinguished by the joins around the forearms and shins and by their paler color.

=== Hillary Clinton ===
In 2006, Edwards created a life-size bust of Senator Hillary Clinton. It is titled Presidential Bust of Hillary Rodham Clinton. The sculpture depicts her wearing a low-cut floral dress.

=== Suri Cruise ===
On 28 August 2006, Edwards unveiled a sculpture titled Suri's bronzed baby poop, purported to be the actual first bowel movement of the baby of Tom Cruise and Katie Holmes. The sculpture was to be auctioned on eBay, and Edwards was commissioned to produce a limited-edition plaster replica. Sources disagreed on whether the bronze sculpture actually contained Suri's excrement: some reported that it did, while others reported the story as being a hoax.

=== Dead Prince Harry ===
A sculpture of Prince Harry depicting him dead, in military uniform, his head resting upon a Bible with a locket of his mother's clasped in his hands and with a vulture standing by his feet. Edwards suggests that the sculpture shows how Prince Harry "must have died the day they told him he couldn't serve" (in Iraq).

=== Oprah Sarcophagus ===
Edwards created a half-scale model depicting Oprah's Sarcophagus at Gardenfresh Gallery in Chicago at In April 2008. The golden bronze casket lid bears an unclothed full-figure rendering of the media mogul with vertical stripes. Alongside it is the artist's Oprah Burial Mask.

=== Other works ===
In 2009, Edwards released String Of Babies depicting mother of eight Nadya Suleman aka Octomom as an octopus embracing the world's only surviving set of octuplets.

On August 9, 2009, Edwards unveiled his latest piece, a nude statue of Angelina Jolie breastfeeding twins, one African and one not.

On August 9, 2011, pictures surfaced of a new statue Edwards had created depicting actress/singer Selena Gomez with her boyfriend singer, Justin Bieber conjoined by the torso, nude, with only coverings on their private parts. Justin was given the Canadian maple leaf as a covering and Selena, the Texas star.

Edwards also created a "memorial" bust of Amy Winehouse.

== Documentary ==
In 2006, feature filmmaker A.D. Calvo produced a series of short documentaries on Edwards and his work. His compilation was entitled La Danse Macabre: Portrait of a Serial Sculptor.

== Sources ==
=== Print ===
Urban, Otto M. (2011). Decadence Now: Visions of Excess. Artefakt/Arbor Vitae. ISBN 978-80-87164-60-0.

Smith, Christopher R. (2011). The Exile of Britney Spears: A Tale of 21st Century Consumption. Intellect, Limited. ISBN 978-1-84150-410-0.

Garson, Helen S. (2011). Oprah Winfrey: A Biography (Greenwood Biographies). ABC-CLIO, Incorporated. ISBN 978-0-313-35832-6.

Kelley, Kitty (April 1, 2010). Oprah: A Biography. Crown. ISBN 978-0-7393-7785-7.

Mancoff, Debra (2009). Icons of Beauty: Art, Culture, and the Image of Women. Greenwood. ISBN 978-0-313-33823-6.

Henriet, Eric-B (2009). L'uchronie. Klincksieck. ISBN 978-2-252-03710-2.

Saehrendt, Kittl, Christian, Steen T. (2009). Yo tambien sabria hacerlo. Entender el arte moderno. Anecdotas y curiosidades. MA NON TROPPO. ISBN 978-84-96924-43-7.

Schechter, Harold (2009). The Whole Death Catalog: A Lively Guide to the Bitter End. Random House Publishing Group. ISBN 978-0-345-49964-6.

Reiter, Mark (2009). The Final Four of Everything. Simon & Schuster Adult Publishing Group. ISBN 978-1-4391-2608-0.

Benjamin, Louis (2009). The Naked and the Lens: A Guide to Nude Photography. Focal Press. ISBN 978-0-240-81159-8.

Bailey, Sue (2009). Grave Expectations: Planning The End Like There's No Tomorrow. Cider Mill Press Book Publishers, LLC. ISBN 978-1-60433-021-2.

Wilks, Timothy (2008). Prince Henry Revived: Image and Exemplarity in Early Modern England. Paul Holberton Publishing. ISBN 978-1-903470-57-2.

Jobson, Robert (2008). Harry's War: The True Story of the Soldier Prince. John Blake Publishing Ltd. ISBN 978-1-84454-672-5.

Kokoli, Alexandra M. (2008). Feminism Reframed: Reflections on Art and Difference. Cambridge Scholars Publishing. ISBN 978-1-84718-405-4.

Marcais, Marchand, Nicolas, Philippe (2008). Crazy Stuff. Firefly Books. ISBN 978-1-55407-426-6.

Newkey-Burden, Chas (2007). Paris Hilton: Life on the Edge. Gardners Books. ISBN 978-1-84454-457-8.

Sweet, Leonard (2007). The Gospel According to Starbucks: Living with a Grande Passion. WaterBrook Press. ISBN 978-1-57856-649-5.

Warkel, Harriet G. (2003). The Herron Chronicle. Indiana University Press. ISBN 0-253-34237-6.

=== Online ===
- 'Brangelina Sculpture To "Inspire" Future Homeowners'(2009-12-07) in PerezHilton.com
