= Olivia Hallinan =

British actress (born 1985)

- Born: 20 January 1985 (age 41); Hounslow, London, England
- Occupation: Actress
- Years active: 1991–2026
- Spouse: Charles Smith
- Children: 3

Olivia Hallinan (born 20 January 1985) is a British actress best known for her role as Laura Timmins in the BBC TV series Lark Rise to Candleford and also as Kim in the Channel 4 drama Sugar Rush. She also starred as Ellie in Girls in Love.

== Biography ==
Hallinan is from Twickenham, West London, and is the second youngest of four sisters. Olivia Hallinan began training at her mother's Saturday drama school All Expressions in Teddington when she was 11, and then went on to professional acting. After attending St Catherine's School in Twickenham, and Notting Hill & Ealing High School, in Ealing, Hallinan went on to study English and Drama at the University of Manchester.

=== Acting career ===
Hallinan's first professional role was in a 1991 production of Jack and the Beanstalk. Since then, she has appeared in theatre, radio, film and on television shows including The Bill, Holby City, My Family, Julia Jekyll and Harriet Hyde and Granada TV's, Girls in Love. At the end of her first year at the University of Manchester, Hallinan appeared in the first of two series of the television drama Sugar Rush for Channel 4, based on the Julie Burchill novel.

While at Manchester, Hallinan was involved in student drama. In 2006, her final year of her degree, she starred in Nicola Schofield's new play, Wake Me Later. That same year she played Emma in the Torchwood episode Out of Time, appeared in an episode of Trial and Retribution, and played a character in Radio 4's dramatisation of Marguerite Duras's erotic novel The Lover, broadcast between 3 and 7 September 2007. She starred as Laura Timmins in the BBC production Lark Rise to Candleford which first aired on Sunday 13 January 2008, appearing in all four series.

Hallinan was named one of the 2008 UK Stars of Tomorrow in Screen International. 2011 saw her film debut as she starred in the British film noir Jack Falls as Natasha.

In 2011 Hallinan starred in Precious Little Talent written by Ella Hickson and directed by James Dacre at Trafalgar Studios theatre in London's West End. In December 2011 Hallinan played the role of Justine in Lucinda Coxon's play "Herding Cats" at the Hampstead Theatre, London, a role she previously played at the Ustinov Studio, Bath in December 2010. In 2013, she starred as Marianne Dashwood in Helen Edmundson's BBC Radio 4 adaptation of Jane Austen's Sense and Sensibility. In 2014 Hallinan appeared in Lotty's War (written by Giuliano Crispini and directed by Bruce Guthrie) at the Yvonne Arnaud Theatre, Guildford, before touring the UK.

== Filmography ==
Year(s)	Film	Role	Notes
1994	Das sprechende Grab	Poppi	
1994	Mole's Christmas	Voice	TV movie
1994	Just William	Susie Chambers	TV series, Episode: “William’s Birthday”
1995	The Adventures of Mole	Voice	TV movie
1995–1998	Julia Jekyll and Harriet Hyde	Julia Jekyll/Voice of Harriet Hyde	TV series (53 episodes)
1999	Doomwatch: Winter Angel	Jessica Tannahill	TV movie
2000	Holby City	Gina Turrell	TV series, Episode: "Moving On"
2001	Doctors	Gemma Davies	TV series, Episode: "No Smoke Without Fire"
2003–2005	Girls in Love	Ellie Allard	TV series (27 episodes)
2005	Murder in Suburbia	Lydia Blakeman	TV series, Episode: "Witches"
2005–2006	Sugar Rush	Kim	TV series (20 episodes)
2006	My Family	Holly	TV series, Episode: "Bliss for Idiots"
2006	Torchwood	Emma	TV series, Episode: "Out of Time"
2007	Lynda La Plante’s Trial & Retribution	Charlotte Rodgers	TV series, Episode: "Mirror Image: Part 1"
2007	Casualty	Jade Dale	TV series, Episode: "Lie to Me"
2008	A Risk Worth Taking	Josie Porter	TV movie
2008–2011	Lark Rise to Candleford	Laura Timmins	TV series (40 episodes)
2010	Moving On	Ruth	TV series (1 episode: "Rules of the Game")
2010	Jack Falls	Natasha	
2011–2013	Comedy Showcase: Chickens	Gwyneth/Gwyneth Knappet	TV series “Pilot” (2011), “Masculinity” (2013)
2012	The Paradise	Mrs Jocelin Brookmire	TV episode (1 episode, aired 2 October 2012)
2014	Love By Design	Claire	
2018	Doctors	Carrie Bennet	TV series, Episode: “Every Move You Make”
2018	Albert: The Power Behind Victoria	Queen Victoria	Post-production
2018	The Dead Ones	Alex	Post-production
2019	Father Brown	Barbara Norman	TV series, season 7, episode 1: “The Great Train Robbery”
