= Sugar Rush (British TV series) =

- Genre: Romantic-dramedy; Teen drama
- Created by: Katie Baxendale
- Based on: Sugar Rush by Julie Burchill
- Starring: Olivia Hallinan; Lenora Crichlow; Sara Stewart; Richard Lumsden; Sarah-Jane Potts
- Opening theme: "One Way or Another" by Blondie
- Country of origin: United Kingdom
- No. of series: 2
- No. of episodes: 20 (list of episodes)

Production
- Executive producer: Julian Murphy
- Producers: Johnny Capps (series 1–2); Lowri Glain (series 2)
- Cinematography: Jim O'Donnell
- Camera setup: Single-camera
- Running time: 30 minutes (including adverts)
- Production company: Shine TV

Original release
- Network: Channel 4
- Release: 7 June 2005 – 17 August 2006

Sugar Rush is a British television teen comedy drama series developed by Shine TV and broadcast by Channel 4, loosely based on the Julie Burchill novel of the same name. It is centred on the life of 15-year-old lesbian Kim Daniels, who has moved from London to Brighton on the south coast of England. Throughout the series, Kim is forced to cope with her dysfunctional family; her burgeoning sexuality; and her infatuation with Sugar, a heterosexual girl.

== Cast ==
- Olivia Hallinan – Kimberly Daniels, fifteen-year-old protagonist and narrator of the series
- Lenora Crichlow – Maria 'Sugar' Sweet, Kim's best friend and infatuation, despite Sugar's heterosexuality and bad reputation
- Sarah-Jane Potts – Saint (real name Sarah), lesbian sex-shop owner and part-time club DJ
- Kurtis O'Brien – Matt Daniels, Kim's confused, strange younger brother
- Sara Stewart – Stella Daniels, Kim and Matt's mother
- Richard Lumsden – Nathan Daniels, Kim and Matt's father
- Andrew Garfield – Tom, Kim's next-door neighbour
- Jalaal Hartley – Mark Evans, Saint's ex-boyfriend
- Laura Donnelly – Beth, Kim's friend
- Neil Jackson – Dale, a hunky handyman
- Anna Wilson-Jones – Anna, a notorious lesbian womaniser

== Plot ==
The first series of Sugar Rush opens with fifteen-year-old Kim (Hallinan) moving to Brighton with her family, and developing a crush on her best friend – heterosexual girl Sugar (Crichlow). Maria 'Sugar' Sweet loves reckless drinking and copious sex with men, and doesn't care for school. The series follows Kim as she tries to gain Sugar's affections, leading to Sugar taking advantage of her kindness.

Side plots of series one include Kim's mother Stella (Stewart) having an affair, Kim's brother Matt (O'Brien) thinking he's an alien, and Kim's neighbour Tom (Garfield) desperately trying to date her.

In series two, eighteen months have passed and Kim learns to leave Sugar behind and go on dates with other women, particularly Saint (Potts), who becomes her serious girlfriend. However, Sugar remaining in Kim's life, albeit not romantically, causes friction in Kim's relationship with Saint.

Side plots in series two include Stella and Nathan (Lumsden) attending sex therapy and becoming more adventurous in their sex life, Sugar's problematic relationships, and Matt exploring his feminine side. Andrew Garfield does not reprise his role as Tom.

== Background/production ==
There were 2 series of Sugar Rush; the first airing in 2005 and the second in 2006. Each series consists of ten episodes, each 30 minutes long, including adverts. The episodes were not individually titled.

In March 2007, Channel 4 stated that Sugar Rush would not be returning for a third series. A spokeswoman claimed that third and fourth series were never planned, but series producer Johnny Capps stated he was "surprised and disappointed" by the cancellation. He claimed that he "certainly had lots of ideas of where to take the next series" and was sad not to be able to finish Kim and Sugar's story properly. Capp stated despite Channel 4 claiming no further seasons were ever planned, he was told privately that the reason for the cancellation was that there was no scheduling spot for the show anymore.

Hallinan and Crichlow subsequently spoke out about the cancellation, saying, "the show was an asset to Channel 4. I don't think Channel 4 recognises Sugar Rush was a brave move and did really well for the channel," and adding that the cancellation, "was a last minute thing, especially the way we leave series two, it sets things up for series three."

== Broadcast ==
The first series was broadcast in 2005 on Channel 4, at 10:50 p.m, but would sometimes air later due to Big Brother 6 UK over-running, with the next episode on E4 afterwards, sometimes overlapping the Channel 4 broadcast. The programme was shown significantly after the watershed.

The first episode of the second series was broadcast on Channel 4 on 15 June 2006, and the last episode was aired on 17 August 2006 on Channel 4, and on 10 August 2006 on digital channel E4.

Series one has reaired on OUTtv in Canada. The whole show was available in the UK on the Channel 4 streaming service, but was later removed for undisclosed reasons.

== Reception ==
On 20 November 2006, Sugar Rush was awarded Best Children & Young People Programme at the 34th International Emmy Awards.

It was nominated for the Best Drama Series BAFTA Television Award in April 2007 – along with Life on Mars and Shameless – but lost to The Street.

Lenora Crichlow's portrayal of the central character Maria 'Sugar' Sweet inspired Burchill to write the 2007 sequel novel Sweet.

== Discrepancies with the novel ==
The TV series is a very loose adaptation of the 2004 novel of the same name, keeping only partial character names and the same overall location. Showrunner Katie Baxendale admitted in a 2015 interview that "we took the main characters from the book, basically, and changed the story completely". Baxendale later remarked that upon reading the changes made to Sugar Rush, Burchill contacted her over email and encouraged her to alter the story more, saying "change what the bloody hell you want, I love it!". As such, the series is barely connected to Burchill's novel.

In the novel, Kim Lewis (Daniels in the series) is portrayed as a judgemental 'posh-girl', who is forced to move from her private girls school to infamous local comprehensive Ravendene. There, she befriends Maria 'Sugar' Sweet, the most popular girl in school and the leader of a clique of mean-girls called the 'Ravers'. Sugar introduces Kim to the world of drink, drugs, and sex, leading to a rift between Kim and her childhood best friend, Zoe 'Saint' Clements.

The events of the novel take place almost entirely within Ravendene, with a narrative involving many high-school drama tropes. Kim's mother Stella is barely present in the novel, having moved to the Bahamas before the novel begins, with a younger man whom she met whilst decorating his house. Further discrepancies are present in the characteristics of Sugar and Saint; Sugar is white in the novel, and is portrayed as vapid and unintelligent, whilst Saint is a middle-class black girl, who Burchill describes through Kim as being 'black like Samantha Mumba's black', and having an 'unrealistic black accent' that she 'picked up off Jerry Springer'. Saint is Kim's long-time best friend in the novel, the two having known each other long before Sugar's appearance.

While the novel has been largely criticised for its prose, stereotyping, and poor characterisation, the series has been conversely praised for its departure from the source material, with modern retrospectives regarding it as a landmark in sincere LGBT representation in British television.

== Media information ==
Both series of Sugar Rush have been released on DVD box-sets. The first series' box-set was released on 15 August 2005. The second series box-set, and a combined series one and two box-set were released on 21 August 2006. An audio CD compilation of some of the first series' licensed music was also released, but a similar release for series 2 was never made.

=== Home media differences ===
The DVD releases of Sugar Rush almost entirely remove the licensed songs that make up the show's soundtrack, and replace them with royalty-free alternatives produced by stock music label Audio Network PLC. The version of the show on Channel 4's video-on-demand service retained the original soundtrack, but has since been removed from the platform. As such, there is no longer any official source of the show with its broadcast audio intact.

The DVD version also contains some additional dialogue, in the form of new narration asides from Kim that are conspicuously absent from the original broadcast and on-demand versions. The reason for this discrepancy is unknown.
