= The Queen (2009 serial) =

2009 British drama-documentary

- DVD cover
- Written by: Colin Swash; Edmund Coulthard; Patrick Reams
- Directed by: Edmund Coulthard; Patrick Reams
- Starring: Emilia Fox; Samantha Bond; Susan Jameson; Barbara Flynn; Diana Quick; Katie McGrath
- Theme music composer: Miguel d'Oliveira
- Country of origin: United Kingdom
- No. of episodes: 5

Production
- Producer: Marion Milne

Original release
- Network: Channel 4
- Release: 28 November – 3 December 2009

The Queen is a 2009 British docudrama miniseries showing Elizabeth II at various points during her life. Broadcast on Channel 4 over five consecutive nights from 29 November 2009, the Queen is portrayed by a different actress in each episode. The series was co-funded by the American Broadcasting Company, the network which aired the series in the US.

This marked the first of two times Emilia Fox and Katie McGrath portrayed sisters: they would go on to appear as Morgause and Morgana in BBC One's Merlin.

== Cast ==
- Steven Mackintosh as the Narrator

=== Episode 1 ===
- Emilia Fox as Elizabeth II
- Katie McGrath as Princess Margaret
- Tristan Sturrock as Peter Townsend
- Simon Williams as Alan "Tommy" Lascelles
- Robert Bathurst as Anthony Eden

=== Episode 2 ===
- Samantha Bond as Elizabeth II
- Philip Jackson as Harold Wilson
- Richard Derrington as Willie Hamilton
- Abby Ford as Princess Anne
- Graham O'Mara as Ian Ball
- Jonathan Hyde as Martin Charteris
- Nicholas Le Prevost as Prince Philip
- Lloyd McGuire as Edward Heath
- Ryan Quish as Mark Phillips

=== Episode 3 ===
- Susan Jameson as Elizabeth II
- Lesley Manville as Margaret Thatcher
- Peter Davison as Denis Thatcher
- Roger Alborough as William Heseltine
- Clive Francis as Prince Philip
- Simon Shackleton as Nigel Wicks
- Michael Maloney as Michael Shea
- Paul Clayton as Bernard Ingham

=== Episode 4 ===
- Barbara Flynn as Elizabeth II
- Paul Rhys as Prince Charles
- Dominic Jephcott as Robert Fellowes
- Ian Shaw as Richard Aylard
- Emily Hamilton as Diana Spencer
- Lucy Chalkley as Sarah Ferguson
- Doreen Mantle as Queen Elizabeth the Queen Mother
- Kenneth Colley as Prince Philip
- Christian Wolf-La'Moy as William Bartholomew

=== Episode 5 ===
- Diana Quick as Elizabeth II
- Martin Turner as Prince Charles
- Joanna Van Gyseghem as Camilla Parker Bowles
- Anthony Smee as Robin Janvrin
- Rick Bacon as Mark Bolland
- Hugh Simon as Stephen Lamport
- June Bailey as Queen Elizabeth the Queen Mother
- Robert Ashby as King Constantine II of Greece
- Davyd Harries as Clergyman

== Production ==
The series was shot in Southern England. Locations used in the filming included Stourhead, Longleat, Neston Park, Grittleton House, Knebworth House and the Orchardleigh Estate.

== Episodes ==
No.	Title	Directed by	Written by	Role of the Queen	Original release date
1	"Margaret"	Edmund Coulthard	Edmund Coulthard, Peter Nicholson and Colin Swash	Emilia Fox	29 November 2009
Princess Margaret's romance with Peter Townsend
2	"Us and Them"	Edmund Coulthard	Edmund Coulthard and Colin Swash	Samantha Bond	30 November 2009
Early 1970s civil unrest and attempted kidnapping of Princess Anne
3	"The Rivals"	Patrick Reams	Patrick Reams	Susan Jameson	1 December 2009
Apartheid (South Africa) boycott and 1986 Commonwealth Games
4	"The Enemy Within"	Patrick Reams	Patrick Reams	Barbara Flynn	2 December 2009
Annus horribilis of 1992
5	"How Do You Solve a Problem Like Camilla?"	Marion Milne	Marion Milne and Colin Swash	Diana Quick	3 December 2009
Wedding of Prince Charles and Camilla Parker Bowles
