= Susan Street =

Susan Street may refer to:

- Susan Street (civil servant)
- Susan Street (dancer), see Australian Dance Awards
- Susan Street, protagonist in Ambition (Julie Birchill novel)
