= The Broken (film) =

- Theatrical release poster
- Directed by: Sean Ellis
- Written by: Sean Ellis
- Produced by: Lene Bausager
- Starring: Lena Headey; Asier Newman; Michelle Duncan; Melvil Poupaud; Richard Jenkins; Andrew Havill
- Cinematography: Angus Hudson
- Edited by: Scott Thomas
- Music by: Guy Farley
- Distributed by: Gaumont (France); The Works (United Kingdom)
- Release date: 18 January 2008 (Sundance Film Festival)
- Running time: 88 minutes
- Countries: France; United Kingdom
- Language: English

The Broken is a 2008 French-British horror film written and directed by Sean Ellis and starring Lena Headey.

== Plot ==
Gina McVey, a successful radiologist, is examining x-rays of a patient with Situs Inversus. On her father John's birthday, Gina, along with her boyfriend Stefan Moreau, her brother Daniel, and his girlfriend Kate Coleman, surprises John at his home. In the middle of the dinner party, a mirror that had been knocked askew when John entered the room falls and shatters. Kate and Gina proceed to clean the shards and discuss that breaking mirrors is a sign of bad luck. At work the next day, Gina is baffled by her assistant, Anthony, when he tells her he just saw her walking out of the building. Gina explains that she has been inside the whole time. On her way home, however, she sees a woman who looks exactly like her driving a car identical to hers, so Gina follows her to her flat and finds a picture of her and her dad in the woman's room. A frightened Gina runs out of the building and drives her car, seemingly disturbed at what she saw, and ends up colliding head-on with another car in the middle of the road. Gina awakens in a hospital with no memory of the accident. She is introduced to a therapist, Dr. Robert Zachman, who leaves his business card. Gina is released, and Stefan takes her home.

Back at Stefan's flat, Gina notices his mirror is missing, and he explains he broke it by accident. Stefan goes to take the dog out, and it snaps at him, which is peculiar. Gina runs a bath, and while relaxing in the tub, she notices a leak in the ceiling and goes to check on it in the attic, but is stopped by Stefan, who appears colder and less emotional than in earlier appearances in the film. Gina sleeps fitfully that evening and has flashbacks of her father's birthday party, the accident, as well as unearthly scenes and a frightening sexual encounter with a seemingly Stefan. Frightened by these developments, Gina contacts Dr. Zachman to express her concern that the man known as Stefan is not really her boyfriend at all. Dr. Zachman suggests this may be a form of Capgras delusion. He advises performing more tests and recommends that Gina visit her wrecked car, hoping it will help her remember the events surrounding the accident.

Meanwhile, Daniel and Kate arrive home to see their neighbor in the stairwell. The neighbor is clearly disturbed and appears to be about to say something. However, his wife watches the man expressionlessly through a crack in the door. The neighbor does not finish what he has to say, and nervously goes into the apartment with his wife.

Gina goes to the auto shop to examine her car, and finds the picture she found of her and John from the woman's flat. While investigating her car, Gina hears shattering glass and turns to see two identical dogs fighting beside a broken mirror. She visits John in his office at the American Embassy and shows him the picture. He begins to worry about what has gotten into his daughter's mind. Later, John's secretary mentions seeing him on the street during lunch, but he tells her he hadn't left the office all day. He goes into the Embassy's men's room, where he finds the mirror broken on the floor.

Kate arrives home to find that Daniel is not there. As Kate peers into the hallway mirror, a being in what appears to be a dark, shadowy version of her house looks back at her. Unaware of her observer, Kate takes a shower, but is disturbed by the sound of a mirror breaking. Suddenly, a woman who looks exactly like her enters the bathroom and murders Kate.

Back to Gina, who is at the subway station, picture in hand, when someone bumps into her, making her drop the photo, which flies onto the subway rail. Gina gets on the ground to reach down for it when she hears a train coming just around the bend. She finally stretches far enough and narrowly escapes being hit by the train, but successfully grabs the picture. Gina visits her father at home, where he tells her the doctor called him and voiced concerns about her opinion that Stefan has changed. She then recounts the events of that day and shows John the picture, to which he replies, "Maybe it's not me." Gina phones Stefan to check on him, but he does not answer. She goes back to Stefan's flat to find it deserted. Gina hears the water leaking once more and goes to the attic to investigate, where she finds Stefan, dead, with his head smashed into a pipe. Panicking, Gina calls John for help, but when a man who looks like John appears out of the shadows behind him, they are disconnected.

Scared, Gina runs into the bathroom and locks the door. Someone jiggles the doorknob from outside and pounds on the door trying to break it open, but Gina gets out through the bathroom window. Suddenly, the door breaks open, and a man looking exactly like Stefan walks into the room. We then see Gina running down the street and into a phone booth, where she relives parts of her day, picks up the receiver, and calls her brother, Daniel. Gina explains to Daniel everything about the woman she saw who looks like her and how she followed her to her flat. Daniel realizes that Gina is talking about her own home and tells Gina that's where she lives. Gina ends the call. Daniel hangs up the phone, turns, and sees broken pieces of a mirror on the floor. Puzzled, he walks further into the apartment when he begins to hear scrubbing noises and follows the sound to the bathroom, where he sees Kate scrubbing the blood-stained floor. Daniel calls Kate, who stands up, and they look at each other with no emotion.

Gina arrives at her flat and is let in the building by the night watchman. Gina gets a spare key to her apartment from him, and he asks if he should make her another key, to which she replies no, she has another set somewhere. Gina continues to her flat and quietly walks in. When she goes into the bathroom, Gina finds a dead body of herself with a plastic bag over her head. Gina pulls the bag off the duplicate's head, causing previously suppressed memories she had been struggling to recall to flood back to her. Gina backs up, crying, looks up, and suddenly remembers coming home, seeing something that frightened her. She drops her wallet, the glass breaks, and she sees herself putting the plastic bag over her head and murdering the real Gina. More memories flit by as Gina processes everything, then she goes to the living room window, looks out, and down at her father, John, who is standing on the sidewalk looking up at her.

The film concludes as Mirror Gina examines x-rays of herself, revealing that she, too, now has Situs Inversus, implying that the patient from the beginning of the film, along with others, is also being replaced by doppelgangers from the other side of the mirror. Daniel comes to see Gina at the hospital, but realizes she has been replaced, much as Gina had earlier realized that Stefan was no longer Stefan. Daniel runs away as Mirror Gina stares at him and smiles. Mirror Gina is then seen driving her car to destinations unknown while smiling eerily.

== Cast ==
- Lena Headey as Gina McVey, a "young and beautiful radiologist", who is the protagonist of the story.
- Richard Jenkins as John McVey
- Asier Newman as Daniel McVey
- Michelle Duncan as Kate Coleman
- Melvil Poupaud as Stephan Moreau
- Howard Ward as Jim
- Andrew Havill as Dr. Myers
- Damian O'Hare as Anthony
- Lobo Chan as Harry Lee

== Release ==
The film premiered on 18 January 2008 as part of the Sundance Film Festival. It also was the first choice in Horrorfest 2009 and was part of Sitges Film Festival 2008, where Angus Hudson won the award for Best Cinematography.

== Reception ==
On the review aggregator website Rotten Tomatoes, 51% of 37 critics' reviews are positive. The website's consensus reads: "A British chiller lacking in strongly drawn characters, The Broken feels unfinished and undercooked."
