= Whatever Love Means =

2005 television film

- DVD cover
- Written by: William Humble
- Directed by: David Blair
- Starring: Olivia Poulet; Laurence Fox
- Theme music composer: Anne Dudley
- Country of origin: United Kingdom
- Original language: English

Production
- Producers: Jolyon Symonds, Michele Buck
- Editor: Mark Day

Original release
- Network: ITV1
- Release: 28 December 2005

Whatever Love Means is a television film about Camilla Parker Bowles and Prince Charles. Directed by David Blair and starring Olivia Poulet and Laurence Fox, it premiered in December 2005 on ITV1. The story centres on Charles and Camilla's relationship in the early 1970s until 1981.

== Plot ==
In 1971, Camilla Shand (Olivia Poulet) meets Charles, Prince of Wales (Laurence Fox) at a polo match. They get to know each other and begin dating. The relationship fizzles out when Charles travels overseas to join the Royal Navy in early 1973. Camilla immediately marries her ex-boyfriend Andrew Parker Bowles (Simon Wilson). Though Charles is hurt upon hearing about her marriage, they remain friends. Throughout their friendship Charles and Camilla hide their feelings for each other until 1979 when Charles' great-uncle and mentor Lord Mountbatten (Richard Johnson) is murdered and Charles visits her more for emotional support. They re-ignite their romantic relationship during this period. Charles is now in his early 30s and his family and the British media begins calling him out to find a suitable bride. He meets Lady Diana Spencer (Michelle Duncan) who the media falls in love with and they eventually get engaged. Although everyone is happy Charles is about to settle down, Charles and Camilla are not due to their feelings for each other, however, they end their relationship. The story ends with Charles and Camilla getting ready for his wedding in 1981, both looking grim while dressing up for the occasion.

== Cast ==
- Laurence Fox as Charles, Prince of Wales
- Olivia Poulet as Camilla Parker Bowles
- Simon Wilson as Andrew Parker Bowles
- Alexandra Moen as Princess Anne
- Richard Johnson as Lord Mountbatten
- Michelle Duncan as Lady Diana Spencer
- Peter Egan as Prince Philip
- Stella McCusker as Elizabeth II
- Andrea Riseborough as Anna Wallace
- Dominic Colenso as Prince Andrew
- Orla O'Rourke as Lady Sarah Spencer
- Charlotte Bradley as Princess Margaret
- Doreen Andrew as the Queen Mother
- Hayley Atwell as Sabrina Guinness

== See also ==
- "How Do You Solve a Problem Like Camilla?"
