= Eight (play) =

Eight is the first play written by Ella Hickson. Hickson created eight monologues ready to premier at Edinburgh's Fringe Festival in August 2008. These monologues (15 minutes each) were written with the goal of portraying a state-of-the-nation group portrait. The official website for the performance describes it as "looking at what has happened to a generation that have grown up in a world where everything has become acceptable."

== Performances ==
For each performance, the audience was asked to vote for which four of the eight monologues they would like to see. As the audience entered the auditorium, all eight characters were lined up across the front of the stage—but only the four characters with the highest votes would perform. The other four characters would remain onstage, reminding the audience that in each choice we make, we are also choosing to leave something behind.

Such a procedure is not essential for a performance of Eight and directors should remain in control of the line-up and order of play if they should so wish.

=== Edinburgh Fringe Festival ===
In May 2008, the director, writer, cast and crew of Eight were all students or alumni of Edinburgh University. The group applied for the free Fringe slot offered, each year, to a student production by Edinburgh University Theatre Company at the Bedlam Theatre. Three months later, the show was performed and went on to win a Fringe First, the Carol Tambor Best of Edinburgh Award, and the NSDF Emerging Artists Award.

The NSDF Emerging Artists Award facilitated a three-night run of 'Eight' at The Pleasance Theatre, Islington which took place in October 2008.

=== New York ===
The Carol Tambor 'Best of Edinburgh' Award, is an award given to only one of the thousands of shows across the Edinburgh Fringe Festival. This award offered an all expenses paid two-week run at New York's PS122.

The New York debut of Eight coincided with New York's two largest off-Broadway festivals—the Under The Radar Festival which is a showcase of new international work held at The Public Theatre and The COIL Festival held at Eight's own venue PS122. Eight was hugely successful in its run, performing sold out shows near enough every performance.

"Ms. Hickson, 23, has already found her voice—and it's a powerful one; a potent show indeed" - The New York Times

=== London ===
After the success of Eight at Edinburgh and New York, Eight was performed at the Trafalgar Studios, London from 6 to 25 July 2009. The run included after-show talks of the "new writing, Fringe preparation and how to make it as a new‐kid in the theatre world".

=== Amateur Rights ===
The script was published 2 July 2009 through Nick Hern Books and featured a ninth monologue only performed once before.

This ninth monologue was the first of these to be written. It was performed by Henry Peters at a scratch night called Candlewasters at Bedlam Theatre, Edinburgh, early 2008. Hickson Explains "Buttons was left out of the final line-up of Eight because his syndrome was too niche to appeal to the wide demographic at the Fringe—he was a little too weird. I am, however, incredibly fond and proud of this monologue; this ninth man, is, after all, where it all began."

== Characters ==
Below are descriptions of each character as they appeared in the published book:

- Danny, twenty-two
- Jude, eighteen
- André, twenty-eight
- Bobby, twenty-two
- Mona, eighteen
- Miles, twenty-seven
- Millie, thirty
- Astrid, twenty-four
- Buttons, mid-thirties

=== Danny ===
Danny is a well-built man in his early twenties. He sits on a black box in the centre of the stage with a corpse's head lain across his knee. He is feeding water to the corpse. He is wearing jeans, a black wife-beater, and black boots. Danny is twenty-two years old, but he appears much younger; his learnt manner is one of faux aggression, however, he fails to disguise an underlying vulnerability. Danny is a little slow but essentially sweet.

=== Jude ===
Jude is eighteen years old, dressed in school trousers, shirt and tie. A large black block, centre stage, acts as a bed and a dinner table—navigated around in the opening sections.

=== André ===
André, originally Andrew, is a twenty-eight-year-old gallery owner. He enters his gallery clearly stricken, takes a moment to catch his breath and positions himself on a high stool.

=== Bobby ===
Bobby is a twenty-two-year-old mother of two wearing a red Adidas tracksuit. She is seated on a table. We imagine her kids, Kyle and Chloë, four and six, at her feet in front of the television. She's reading down to them in enthusiasm. Bobby has a strong, working-class Edinburgh accent, she mimics an upper-middle-class English accent when impersonating Mrs. Beeton.

=== Mona ===
Mona is a small, dark-haired girl in her late teens, with a mild pregnancy bump that is not seen immediately. Her hair is loose around her face; she has the innocence of youth and yet acts with disquieting intensity. The stage is set with a centre block and one chair placed at its side.

=== Miles ===
Miles is an American man in his mid-twenties. He is dressed in a sharp suit and is attractive due to a corporate aesthetic. He should carry himself with ultimate bodily and vocal composure. The cracks in this composure should be perfectly synchronised with the glimpses of weakness in his performative façade.

=== Millie ===
Millie is an apparently well-to-do lady, in her early thirties, dressed in tennis whites and wielding a tennis racket. She is mid-mime, straddling an imaginary middle-aged man, flailing wildly.

=== Astrid ===
Astrid is in her early twenties. She is slim and attractive, the kind of girl that seems comfortable in her own skin. Tonight, however, she is a little drunk. She is returning from a night out and is dressed accordingly. There is a bed in the centre of the stage—the audience can see a man sleeping in it. She slowly climbs into bed next to the man—desperately trying not to wake him. She lies there, restless for several seconds, then sits up.

=== Buttons ===
'Buttons' is a well-built, tensile-looking man in his mid-thirties, grunting his way through press-ups on the floor of a prison cell. The room contains a grubby campbed, a dilapidated toilet, a desk and a chair. He will reach the end of a ten-year jail sentence tomorrow morning. He knows the small space well, it fits him and he owns it. There is a sense of latent sexual and physical power about the man.
