= Sugar Rush (novel) =

2004 novel by Julie Burchill

- First edition
- Author: Julie Burchill
- Language: English
- Genre: Novel
- Publisher: Macmillan Children's Books
- Publication date: 2004
- Publication place: United Kingdom
- Media type: Print (Paperback)
- ISBN: 0-330-41583-2
- OCLC: 57574819

Sugar Rush is Julie Burchill's first novel aimed at teenagers, published in 2004. It charts the progress of Kim Lewis as she is forced to leave her posh high school and attend the infamous local comprehensive, Ravendene. This coincides with a fight with her best friend, Zoe "Saint" Clements, leading to her making friends with Ravendene's "Top Girl": Maria "Sugar" Sweet. Eventually, Kim falls for Sugar, Sugar falls into bed with Kim, and the friendship takes on an ever more intense nature that eventually turns tragic.

The book has been praised as a frank and well-written account of teenage trials and tribulations. It contains some explicit content.

== Film, TV or theatrical adaptations ==
Sugar Rush was turned into a television series on Channel Four in 2005, featuring Olivia Hallinan as Kim and Lenora Crichlow as Sugar. Crichlow's portrayal of the central character Maria "Sugar" Sweet inspired Burchill to write the 2007 sequel Sweet.
