= Precious Little Talent =

- Written by: Ella Hickson
- Characters: Joey; Sam; George
- Original language: English
- Genre: Romance comedy
- Setting: New York City

Premiere
- Place premiered: Bedlam Theatre (2009); Trafalgar Studios (2011); West End Theatre (2017)

Precious Little Talent is a 2009 play written and directed by Ella Hickson. The characters of Joey, Sam and George were first played by Emma Hiddleston, Simon Ginty and John McColl in the 2009 play and by Olivia Hallinan, Anthony Welsh and Ian Gelder in the 2011 revival. The 2009 version played at the Bedlam Theatre in the 2009 Edinburgh Festival Fringe. The NY Premiere Production in 2017, directed by George C. Heslin, starred Connor Delves (Sam), Eliza Shea (Joey) and Greg Mullavey (George).

== Summary ==
Joey has had a privileged upbringing, with the best schools and is a recent English law graduate. But after recently losing her job, she goes to New York City on Christmas Eve to visit her father, George, without giving him notice. He has lived alone since the end of his marriage and even his relationship with Joey has slipped.

While on a rooftop in Manhattan, circumstances lead Joey to meet Sam, a lively nineteen-year-old American. They have a whirlwind of a romance for one night and end up falling for each other. What she doesn't realize though is that Sam works for her father as a caregiver while her father slowly starts losing the capacity to care for himself.

== Cast ==
- Emma Hiddleston as Joey
- Simon Ginty as Sam
- John McColl as George, Joey's 60-year-old father

2017 NY Premiere Production

- Connor Delves as Sam
- Eliza Shea as Joey
- Greg Mullavey as George

== 2011 revival ==
Olivia Hallinan portrayed Joey while Ian Gelder and Anthony Welsh played George and Sam respectively. It played at the Trafalgar Studios from April 5 to April 30.

== 2017 NY Premiere Production ==
Connor Delves (Sam), Eliza Shea (Joey) and Greg Mullavey (George) starred in the NY Premiere production in a limited engagement from September 20–30, at the West End Theatre. The production was directed by George C. Heslin and designed by Maruti Evans. "All three actors, Connor Delves, Eliza Shea and Greg Mullavey give really fine performances. The set, by Maruti Evans is quite imaginative. Under the direction of George C. Heslin, the play moves along, keeping you engaged." - Culture Digest.

== Reviews ==
Lyn Gardner with The Guardian said "it is young, full of spluttering energy and, unlike Joey, it has a real fire in its belly about the need to retain your optimism in a cruel world." and that Emma Hiddleston played with "petulant energy".

Hiddleston was nominated for a Stage Award for Best Actress for her role as Joey at the 2009 Edinburgh Fringe Festival.

The Stage's Aleks Sierz said of the actors performances "Ian Gelder’s George convincingly sways between bemused petulance and sudden anger, while Joey, played by Olivia Hallinan mixes reckless confidence with acute vulnerability. As Sam, Anthony Welsh glows with idealistic charm."

NY Production "All three actors, Connor Delves, Eliza Shea and Greg Mullavey give really fine performances. The set, by Maruti Evans is quite imaginative. Under the direction of George C. Heslin, the play moves along, keeping you engaged." - Culture Digest.
