= Diana Quick =

English actress

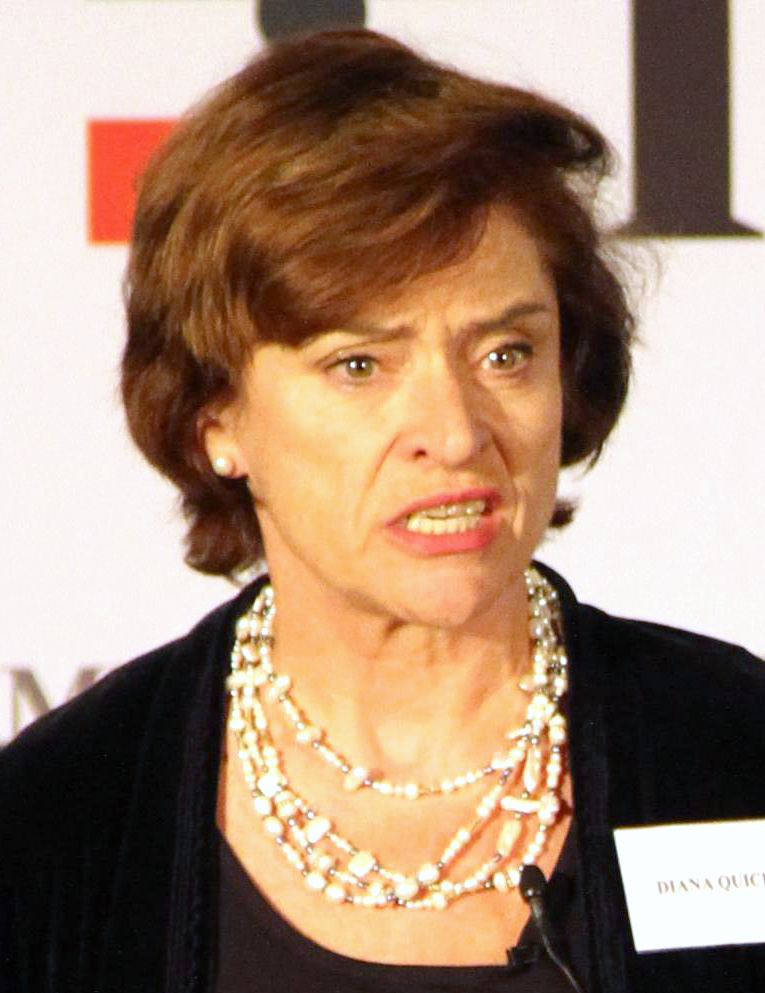
- Quick in 2011
- Born: Diana Marilyn Quick; 23 November 1946 (age 79); London, England
- Education: Lady Margaret Hall, Oxford
- Occupation: Actress
- Years active: 1958–present
- Spouse: Kenneth Cranham (m. 1974; div. 1978)
- Partner: Bill Nighy (1982–2008)
- Children: Mary Nighy

Diana Marilyn Quick (born 23 November 1946) is an English actress.

== Early life and family background ==
Quick was born on 23 November 1946 in London, England. She grew up in Dartford, Kent, the third of four children. Her father was Leonard Quick, a dentist. Her mother was Joan Quick. She was educated at Dartford Grammar School for Girls, Kent. She was greatly aided by her English teacher, who encouraged her to pursue acting. She became a member of an amateur dramatic society in Crayford, Kent, while at school as well as appearing in many school productions. On leaving school, she went on in 1964 to pursue further studies at Lady Margaret Hall, Oxford. Quick was the first female president of the Oxford University Dramatic Society.

Quick spent seven years researching a book about her paternal family's life in India, which was published in 2009 by Virago with the title A Tug on the Thread: From the British Raj to the British Stage. In her book, Quick reveals that she is of mixed race (Anglo-Indian) descent. Her great-grandfather served 23 years in the army in India before becoming a policeman, and her great-grandmother had to flee from the Indian Rebellion of 1857 after her father was killed.

== Career ==
Quick is perhaps best known for the role of Lady Julia Flyte in the television production of Brideshead Revisited. She received an Emmy and British Academy Television Awards nomination for her work. Quick has also appeared in many theatre, film and television productions. She made her stage debut in A Midsummer Night's Dream at the Open Air Theatre, Regent's Park, London, in 1959. She has appeared in many stage productions in the United Kingdom and the United States, including The Rivals (1965), Hedda Gabler (1968), Measure for Measure (1970), The School for Scandal (1972), Hay Fever (1973), The Duchess of Malfi (1975), Saint Joan (1977), The Skin of Our Teeth (1981), and The Good Person of Szechwan (1984). Other stage work has included roles in Shakespeare's Troilus and Cressida and Brecht's The Threepenny Opera.

In 2009, she portrayed Queen Elizabeth II in "How Do You Solve a Problem Like Camilla?", an episode of the television documentary drama The Queen. Quick had played the same character as a younger woman in Alan Bennett's stageplay A Question of Attribution, one half of his Single Spies double bill. She explained how she prepared for the television role:

I think one has to try to be as accurate as possible. You have to wear the right clothes, and in my case I wore a white wig, because I'm playing her as a mature Queen rather than when she was a younger woman. So you try and get the externals as accurate as possible, but then I think it's like any acting challenge, you just try to play the situation as truthfully as you can. So you play the spirit of the thing rather than the documentary reality of it.

== Personal life ==
Quick was married to Scottish actor Kenneth Cranham from 1974 until they divorced in 1978. From 1982 until 2008 her partner was English actor Bill Nighy with whom she worked in David Hare's A Map of the World at the National Theatre in 1982. They have one daughter, actress Mary Nighy, born in 1984.

== Politics ==
Quick was one of several celebrities who endorsed the successful parliamentary candidacy of the Green Party's Caroline Lucas at the 2015 general election.

== Filmography ==
=== Film ===
- The Brothers Karamazov (1958) - Minor Role (uncredited)
- Nicholas and Alexandra (1971) - Sonya
- A Private Enterprise (1974) - Penny
- The Duellists (1977) - Laura
- The Big Sleep (1978) - Mona Grant
- The Odd Job (1978) - Fiona Harris
- Ordeal by Innocence (1984) - Gwenda Vaughan
- 1919 (1985) - Anna
- Max mon amour (1986) - Camille
- Vroom (1988) - Susan
- Wilt (1989) - Sally
- Nostradamus (1994) - Diane de Poitiers
- Rasputin: Dark Servant of Destiny (1996) - Grand Duchess Ella
- The Leading Man (1996) - Susan
- Vigo (1998) - Emily
- A Monkey's Tale (1999) - Princess Ida (voice)
- Saving Grace (2000) - Honey
- The Discovery of Heaven (2001) - Sophia Brons
- The Affair of the Necklace (2001) - Madame Pomfré
- AKA (2002) - Lady Gryffoyn
- Revengers Tragedy (2002) - The Duchess
- Love/Loss (2010) - Angela
- Mother's Milk (2011) - Kettle
- Side by Side (2013) - Joan Dunbar
- The Death of Stalin (2017) - Polina Molotova
- Forever Young (2023) - Robyn Smith
- Practical Magic 2 (2026) - Margaret

=== Television ===
- The Complete and Utter History of Britain (1969) - Ladye / Damsel in Distress
- A Christmas Carol (1971, TV Short) - Ghost of Christmas Past (voice)
- The Protectors (1974, Episode: "The Bridge") - Anna De Santos
- Kolchak: The Night Stalker (1975, Episode: "The Trevi Collection") - Ariel (as Diane Quick)
- The Three Hostages (1977, TV Movie) - Mary Hannay
- Brideshead Revisited (1981) - Julia Flyte / Julia Mottram
- The Woman in White (1982) - Marian Halcombe
- Minder: An Officer and a Car Salesman (1988) - Angie
- Clarissa (1991) - Lady Betty
- Inspector Morse (1992) - Hilary Stephens
- Dandelion Dead (1994) - Marion Glassford-Gale
- Little Big Mouth (2001) - Cass
- Dalziel and Pascoe (2002) - ACC Stella Applegarth - “For Love Nor Money”, “The Unwanted”
- Agatha Christie’s Poirot (2003) - Mrs. Welman - Episode: “Sad Cypress”
- Doctor Who: Scream of the Shalka (2003) - Prime - 5 episodes
- Midsomer Murders (2004) - Clare Bonavita - Episode: “Dead in the Water”
- Kingdom (2008) - Janet Cramer
- The Queen (2009) - The Queen
- New Tricks (2009) - Julia Eldridge
- Lewis (2010) - Gwen Raeburn
- Law & Order: UK (2010–2014) – Judge Hall
- Inspector George Gently (2012) - Gitta Bronson - Episode: “Gently in the Cathedral”
- The Missing (2014) - Mary Garrett - Episode: “Molly”
- Midsomer Murders (2016) - Hermione Lancaster - Episode: “Habeas Corpus”
- Houdini and Doyle (2016) – Cecilia Weiss – 4 episodes
- The Living and the Dead (2016) - Sylvia - TV Series
- Father Brown (2022) - Lady Cecily - Episode: “The Final Devotion”
- The Famous Five (2023) - Mrs Wentworth - Episode: "The Curse of Kirrin Island"
- The Chelsea Detective (2026) - Allegra Davenstock - Episode: "The 13th Earl"
