= Simon Wilson (actor) =

British actor (born 1981)

Simon Wilson is a British actor. He had a brief run on the television show EastEnders in 2010, playing the role of Mr. Steele. He also played the role of Andrew Parker Bowles in the 2005 made-for-television movie Charles & Camilla: Whatever Love Means.

== Filmography ==
=== Film ===
Year	Title	Role	Notes
2001	Beginner's Luck	Old luvvie	
2002	Woman X	William Chesterfield	Short film
2011	The Best Exotic Marigold Hotel	Madge's Son-in-Law	
2012	Now Is Good	Suit	
2018	London Unplugged	Simon	
2018	Kew Gardens	Simon	Short film, adaptation of Virginia Woolf’s short story ‘Kew Gardens’

=== Television ===
Year	Title	Role	Notes
2002	Wire in the Blood	Geoff Taylor	”Justice Painted Blind: Part 1” S1:E5
2003	Hear the Silence	Worried father	TV Movie
2004	Murphy's Law	Mark Patterson	”Go Ask Alice” S2:E4
2004	A Thing Called Love	Conductor	”Love Hurts” S1:E6
2004	Auf Wiedersehen, Pet	Reporter	”Au Revoir: Part 2” S5:E2
2005	The Inspector Lynley Mysteries	James Walthew	”In Divine Proportion” S4:E1
2005	The Girl in the Café	Journalist	TV Movie
2005	The First Black Britons	Lieutenant Slessor	TV Movie
2005	Charles & Camilla: Whatever Love Means	Andrew Parker Bowles	Made for ITV and premiered in the US on Lifetime
2007	Rough Crossings	Capt. Jonathon Coffin	TV Movie
2007	Midsomer Murders	Alan Delaney	”Death and Dust” S10:E5
2007	The Whistleblowers	Journalist	”Ghosts” S1:E1
2007	Britz	Senior Diplomat	2 episodes; series 1
2009	Waking the Dead	Andrew	“End of the Night: Parts 1 and 2” S8:E3 & E4
2010	EastEnders	Mr. Steele	TV series; 8 episodes
2012	Silk	Paddy Caffrey	S2:E3
2012	Twenty Twelve	TV Reporter - Sam	3 episodes; series 2
2013	Lewis	Dr. Matt Whitby	”The Ramblin’ Boy: Part 1” S7:E3
2013	Luther	Dr Joe Green	S3:E4
2013	Holby City	Angus Keates	”Contra Mundum” S15:E49
2014	The Crimson Field	Padre	3 episodes
2014	WW1 Uncut	German Soldier 1	”Dogs & Other Animals” S1:E5
2015	Unforgotten	James	S1:E1
2015	Casualty	Simon Dale	”Fix You” S29:E34
2016-2018	Tommies	Hubery Puckle / Gartman	Podcast series; 2 episodes
2020	Get Even	Henry	Recurring role; 7 episodes
2008, 2021	Doctors	Rich Marshall / David Dempster	2 episodes
2022	Anne	PC Glave	TV Mini Series; 1 episode

== Stage ==
Year	Title	Role	Notes
2006	The Comedy of Errors	Antipholus of Ephesus	Directed by Christopher Luscombe at The Globe Theatre (London)
