= The Burning (play) =

- Written by: Stewart Conn
- Subject: Witchcraft, Persecution
- Genre: Drama
- Setting: Kingdom of Scotland

Premiere
- Date: November 18, 1971
- Place: Royal Lyceum Theatre, Edinburgh, Scotland

The Burning is a 1971 historical play, written by Stewart Conn. Set during the life of James VI of Scotland, the play addresses the power struggle between the King and his cousin, the Earl of Bothwell. It exemplifies the brutality meted out to those caught in the midst of any struggle for religious or political power, and also deals with themes of witchcraft and superstition within the context of a battle between authority and anarchy. Conn's play was partly inspired by, and written in answer to, Robert McLellan's four-act comedy, Jamie the Saxt (1936), which earlier depicted the same period and events, though with a less direct portrayal of the King's major role in the persecution of witchcraft.

The play was revived by Theatre Alba in 2003, in a production staged at the Brunton Theatre, Musselburgh, and in Duddingston Kirk Manse Gardens during the Edinburgh Festival Fringe.
