= Ella Hickson =

British playwright and director

Ella Hickson FRSL (born 1985) is a British playwright and theatrical director, living in London.

== Early life ==
Hickson was brought up in Guildford in Surrey and educated at Guildford High School from 1996 to 2003.

== Career ==
Hickson's first play, Eight, produced by the Edinburgh University Theatre Company, won a Fringe First, the Carol Tambor Best of Edinburgh Award and the NSDF Emerging Artists Award at the Edinburgh Fringe in 2008. The show toured to New York City in January 2009 and opened at Trafalgar Studios in July 2009. Hickson's second play Precious Little Talent opened at Trafalgar Studios in March 2011, directed by James Dacre. In 2012 her third play Boys premiered at HighTide Festival Theatre directed by Robert Icke for Headlong Theatre. It went on to tour at Nuffield Southampton Venues, as well as Soho Theatre London. In 2013 her play Wendy & Peter Pan, an adaptation of J.M. Barrie's novel, was produced at the Royal Shakespeare Company for the Christmas 2013 season, directed by Jonathan Munby. It was later revived for the Christmas 2015 season. In 2014 her adaptation of the legends of Merlin opened at Royal & Derngate and Nuffield Southampton, directed by Liam Steel. In October 2016 her play Oil premiered at the Almeida, starring Anne-Marie Duff and directed by Carrie Cracknell. In 2018 the Almeida staged The Writer, directed by Blanche McIntyre and featuring Sam West, Romola Garai and Lara Rossi. In 2019 Anna a binaural thriller, opened at The National Theatre. Hickson collaborated with sound designers, Ben and Max Ringham. The play was directed by Natalie Abrahami.

Hickson currently teaches at Oxford University.

== Recognition ==
In 2011, Hickson appeared in The Guardian's culture section as one of the four young playwrights to watch in the future.

In June 2018 she was elected Fellow of the Royal Society of Literature in its "40 Under 40" initiative.
