= List of Sugar Rush episodes =

This is a list of episodes of the British television programme Sugar Rush, which was broadcast by Channel 4 from 2005 to 2006. The programme has two series; the first aired in 2005, and the second in 2006. Each series consists of ten episodes, each 30 minutes long (including advertisements). The episodes do not have individual titles.

== Series 1 (2005) ==
The first series consists of ten episodes, and follows 15-year-old Kim's unrequited crush on Sugar.

=== Episode 1 ===
Kim and Sugar are on the waltzers at Brighton Pier, and Sugar slowly moves in to kiss Kim. Kim is then in bed under a duvet with her eyes closed, and whirring is heard. There is a knock at her door; she jumps up, and the whirring stops. Kim was using an electric toothbrush to "masturbate about her best friend".

Kim's family is new in the neighbourhood. Dave and David, a gay couple, are neighbours who recommend a handyman for Nathan and Stella and imply that he might be gay.

Kim describes how she met Maria Sweet (Sugar). She is obsessed with her, but Sugar is straight. Kim was outside a clothes shop when Sugar ran out of the shop after shoplifting.

Kim wonders how she knows she is gay if she has never had sex with a man. A male student starts flirting with her, and she replies, "Die"; he responds with "Dyke". Kim tells Sugar that she wants to have sex (quickly adding "with a man"), and Sugar thinks Kim has a crush on a boy.

Kim meets Dale, the handyman, to whom Stella is attracted. She calls Sugar, tells her about him, and is invited to her flat for tips on flirting with men. Sugar tells Kim to strip, and says that few men would be attracted to her in her clothes. They get drunk, and try on clothes. Sugar throws Kim onto her bed, climbs on top of her and tells her to flirt with her, pretending that she is Dale. Kim, aroused, leaves.

She says that trying to sleep with Dale is not important anymore because Sugar has replaced him. As Kim enters the house, she hears banging and assumes it is Dale working. She hears moaning, and finds Stella bent over the kitchen table having sex with Dale. She runs out of the house, followed by Stella, who says that nobody is perfect.

Kim leaves the dinner table saying she is going to be sick due to the amount of sexual innuendo. The doorbell rings; it is Tom, the adopted son of Dave and David with whom she has nothing in common. He kisses Kim (quickly saying afterward that he is not queer) before going into the bathroom. Kim leaves to meet Sugar at a club. Sugar introduces her to Daz and "the Donkey", the worst DJ in Brighton. She gets intimate with Daz, and Kim sits next to the Donkey.

Nathan massages Stella's feet, talking about the fact that Kim is acting strangely and does not call him Dad. Stella reminds him that they have asked the children to call them Stella and Nathan.

Sugar finds Kim (who has locked herself in the bathroom), goes into the cubicle next to hers and climbs over. She outlines her foot on the cubicle wall with a marker, and does the same with Kim's. Sugar advises Kim to get drunk and forget her problems, and Kim cries as she walks home from the club. She goes to check on her brother, but stops when she sees Stella in her bedroom on the phone with (presumably) Dale. Nathan goes to Kim's room with food and, as he asks if something is wrong, she calls him Dad.

=== Episode 2 ===
Kim is getting ready to go out, and Stella tries to keep her from telling Nathan she is having an affair with Dale. Sugar tells Kim that she should get revenge on her mother, and Kim tries to thwart Stella's plans to meet Dale by telling Nathan that she was planning to take the family bowling. Nathan reminds Stella and Kim that they have a parents' evening at Kim's school.

Kim's teacher asks her parents how they think she is settling in, and if moving may have disrupted her life. The teacher says Kim seems distracted, as though she is worried about something.

Kim does not enjoy a "mother and daughter day" with Sugar at a spa. Stella leaves her credit card on a table as she and Sugar continue drinking and discussing her affair. Kim tells Stella to end the affair with Dale, but Stella tries to blame her. Kim walks out, and Sugar follows. She asks why she was so nice to Stella; Sugar asks if Kim wants revenge, and takes out Stella's credit card. They buy clothes, and discover that the shop has a Chip and PIN terminal; Kim keys in her mother's PIN, and Sugar orders a crate of alcopops by phone.

Kim realises that Sugar only wants Kim for her mother's credit card, and tells her that she will not continue being her lapdog. When she returns home, she finds Stella and Dale in the front room about to have sex when Nathan and Matt return. Kim covers for Stella, who says that the family will stay together if Nathan does not know about the affair.

She meets Sugar at the club, who is getting off with Ray (the doorman). Kim says no to watching them make out, but then turns back.

=== Episode 3 ===
On Nathan and Stella's fifteenth wedding anniversary, Stella is continuing her affair with Dale. Chewing gum is stuck to Sugar's knickers, and she throws them away. Kim retrieves them, and puts them into her bag. She begins to consider date-raping Sugar because Sugar said she was too drunk to remember having sex with anyone. Stella says she has a hairdresser's appointment, and meets Dale at a hotel. Matt paints a doll blue, and dunks his pet hamster in the paint.

Kim leaves a handful of pills on a table. Stella and Nathan leave for their anniversary dinner, and Matt has painted himself blue. Sugar arrives with a bottle of wine and a pizza. Kim puts the pizza on the table, on top of the pills; Sugar picks up the pizza and is surprised to see them. The pills disappear, and Kim sees Sugar lying on the sofa with her eyes closed. Kim puts her hands on Sugar's breasts, begging her to breathe. Sugar blows cigarette smoke in Kim's face and removes an earpiece, wondering why Kim is touching her breasts. Nathan and Stella return to find Matt unconscious on the floor; he took the pills because he thought they were "space-food'.

Stella and Nathan bring Matt to a psychologist. Sugar lets Kim stay at her flat and they sleep in the same bed, facing opposite ends. Kim learns that Sugar cannot sleep without sleeping pills, and disappears under the covers.

=== Episode 4 ===
At the beach, it is cold and raining. Nathan and Matt are wearing scuba equipment, and Stella and Kim are in the car. Kim goes to Sugar's house, planning to tell her that she loves her or their friendship is over. Sugar opens the door in her underwear, with cream on her pubic area; she has pubic lice, but does not know from whom.

Kim realises that she also has lice, and Stella wears her jeans without her permission. Kim washes her clothes and teddy bear. Stella goes out with another false pretext. She and Dale learn that they also have pubic lice. Nathan is faithful to Stella and Dale is the only other person Stella has had sex with, so she assumes the lice are from him. Kim is convinced that she gave her mother the lice, and they use lice shampoo. Nathan notices an odor; Kim and Stella attribute it to "hair remover", since Stella thinks she gave Kim the lice. Kim later tells Stella to stop borrowing her clothes and to end the affair with Dale if she does not want Nathan to find out.

Kim and Matt are awakened by Stella and Nathan arguing. Nathan now has pubic lice, and tells Stella that he has not had sex with anyone but her for eighteen years. Stella admits the affair; Kim goes to see Sugar, crying on her doorstep. She may still be infected, and Sugar tells Kim to take her clothes off so she can apply lice-killing cream.

=== Episode 5 ===
Nathan says that he does not want Stella in the house anymore, and does not care where she goes. Kim is introduced to Sugar's French boyfriend, Guillaume, who does not speak English; Sugar does not speak French, and wants Kim to bridge their language barrier. Stella has moved in with Dale (whose house is a mess), and continues their affair. Asked who will translate for her, Kim tells Sugar to fuck off in French.

Sugar calls Kim to ask how to say "cunnilingus" in French. Kim does not know, but later realises that she can have Sugar if she breaks them up; she calls Sugar back and tells her how to say that she wants "anal sex" in French.

At the fair, Sugar tells Kim that she did not get what she was expecting the night before but it was still good. Kim begins deliberately mistranslating what Sugar and Guillaume are saying. Sugar wonders why Guillaume wants to leave, and Matt tells her that Kim told him that Sugar needed some alone time. Nathan is sleeping on what was the kitchen table. Sugar and Kim move him to the sofa, Sugar says she will forgive Kim if she can get her one more night with Guillaume. Kim meets Guillaume, who returns to Sugar one more time before he leaves in 48 hours.

Kim goes to Dale's flat, wanting Stella to return home. Stella is cleaning and cooking (which she did not do for Nathan), and thinks her family are better off without her. Kim returns home without her, and Nathan is getting back to normal.

Sugar does not want Guillaume to leave. He calls her "my little whore" in French, but Kim translates it as "my little angel" to spare her feelings. After he boards the coach, Sugar asks what else he said; Kim says that he said he loves her, and would like to see two women kissing. Sugar kisses Kim, stunning Guillaume as the coach pulls away.

=== Episode 6 ===
Kim is happy after Sugar's kiss, but Sugar prepares to go to Paris to see Guillaume because she thinks he loves her. As she is about to board a coach for France, Kim tries to admit lying to her. After realising that Guillaume does not love her, Sugar returns home with Kim carrying her suitcase. They go to the club, and see Tom; Kim and Sugar sit together, and Tom watches them from the other side of the bar.

Sugar talks about why things go so wrong for her, and Kim flirtatiously tells her that she may be looking in the wrong place for romance. Sugar replies that she is looking for somebody to fuck, not somebody to love. Realising that Sugar does not have feelings for her, Kim walks away and sits on a fairground ride. She decides, again, to tell Sugar how she feels. She goes to Sugar's bedroom, and speaks to a body under the sheets. Sugar comes in; Tom is under the sheets.

Kim wakes up, regretting being too drunk to remember what happened the night before. Sugar tells her about the amazing sex she thinks she and Tom had the night before, and Kim kidnaps Tom's dog when he is in a shop. Tom gets a text telling him to collect his dog at 8 pm. Kim ties Vanessa (his dog) to a lamppost and leaves her on the side of the road. Matt acts out.

At the club, and Sugar tells Kim that Tom cancelled on her at 7:55 pm. He arrives where Vanessa was tied, but she escaped her lead and was killed by a car.

At the pier, Sugar says that Kim and Tom would probably be a good couple. Kim says that Tom is definitely not her type; Sugar jokingly suggests that she may be more Kim's type, and Kim does not deny it. Sugar realises that Kim has feelings for her; Kim leaves, and she thinks.

=== Episode 7 ===
Kim remains in her bedroom for a week. Sugar calls her frequently, but she does not answer. Sugar knows that Kim is gay and attracted to her, but is acting like nothing happened; this worries Kim.

Sugar asks what lesbians do sexually, but Kim does not really know. Sugar asks how she knows she is gay if she has never had sex with a man, but Kim wants to change the subject. Sugar tells Kim that she is done with men, and it is time to find other ways to enjoy herself. When they are sitting in deck chairs next to each other, Sugar puts out her hand and Kim holds it.

Outside a nightclub, Sugar gives Kim half of an ecstasy tablet and takes the other half. In the club, they dance with each other. When asked by a man if they are lesbians, Sugar replies that they are. She kisses Kim twice, the second time more intimately. Kim goes to the bar to order drinks for her and Sugar; when she returns, Sugar is making out with the man who asked if she was gay. Running outside, Kim is sick and begins crying. She staggers down the road, and finds her mother sitting on a bench.

Stella tells Kim that she got bored with Dale, and he was only good for sex. In a taxi Kim reminds herself of the happy times she had with Sugar, with her mother almost unconscious on her shoulder.

=== Episode 8 ===
Kim begins disposing of Sugar's things. She picks up a can that Sugar had drunk from, and puts her lips to it for a moment before throwing it away.

Kim starts attending an ex-gay meeting at a church. She meets Beth, who is there to meet other girls. Kim sees Sugar at school and keeps saying, "Sugar is bad for me". One of the "steps" of the ex-gay program involves "hanging out with like-minded people", and she falls for Beth. Concerned, Kim decides to get drunk and forget about things. She goes to the club bar, and is not served because she is under-aged; a man buys her a drink. He gropes Kim in the toilet cubicle where Sugar and Kim drew on the wall, and tries to pull her clothes down; she starts to shake and cry as she looks at the feet drawn on the wall. The man, realising that she is a virgin, quickly leaves.

Tom invites her in; they get drunk and have sex, with Kim imagining that he is Sugar. Afterwards, he thanks her.

Nathan prepares a special cake for Stella, but Stella begins to choke on it. He tries to perform the Heimlich maneuver, breaks a rib, and calls 999 for an ambulance.

Kim sees the ambulance outside, with her mother wearing an oxygen mask. Sugar is on her bed, saying that she brought a bottle of whiskey but Kim was not there and she drank it. She tells Kim that the kiss in the nightclub was no big deal because they were high on ecstasy. Kim says that it was a big deal to her; Sugar kisses her and leaves. At the ex-gay meeting, Kim flirts subtly with Beth.

=== Episode 9 ===
Back from hospital, Stella is in bed and relies on Nathan for everything. Nathan asks Kim to look after Matt, because he is leaving Stella. Kim goes to a café. Beth sees Kim crying, and listens as she talks about Nathan leaving Stella. Kim tells Beth that she still wants to have sex with Sugar, and Beth tells Kim that she is only going to the ex-gay meetings to look for sex. They see Tom (who thinks he and Kim are a couple), and Kim tells him she is gay. She walks away with Beth, who says that Sugar is a waste of her time. Beth asks why Kim has only met one girl she likes in her three months in Brighton, and says that she should be taking advantage of Brighton's gay community. She points to the water; Kim has not swum in it yet, and Beth grabs Kim by the hand and runs fully-clothed into the water with her. When Kim and Beth are drying their hair, Beth moves over to kiss her.

Kim asks Beth why she cannot meet somebody who likes her, and then kisses Beth. Beth tells Kim that she should speak to Stella about her coming back home. Kim tells Stella that she wants her to speak to Nathan. She tells Stella that she is not a good mother, but she still wants her if she is with Nathan. Stella calls Nathan, and Kim meets him on the doorstep when she goes out. Nathan tells Stella that she has turned him into a man he never wanted to be, and she should leave.

Kim and Beth meet at Brighton Pier, where Kim's phone rings. It is Sugar, sounding upset and saying that she needs her; she is covered in blood. Kim looks at Beth, and runs off to find Sugar.

=== Episode 10 ===
Kim looks for Sugar on the beach and finds her on the ground, crying and covered in blood. Sugar tries to leave, and tells her that she stabbed someone.

Sugar and Kim are walking through Brighton Pier at night, and Sugar asks how much money Kim has. Kim says not much, so Sugar shoplifts and steals unattended handbags. Kim tries to get Sugar to go to her house by telling her that she has money there. Sugar tells her that she plans to go to London. She asks Kim if she wants to come, telling her to forget it when she does not get an answer. When Kim gets home, Stella tells her that she and Nathan are getting a divorce. Kim goes to her room and cries, but wonders why she is waiting for Stella to leave when she can go to London with Sugar. She packs a bag, goes through her parents' things for money and what she can sell, and leaves.

Sugar and Kim see a police car, and Sugar hides. Sugar, paranoid about rooftop snipers, tells Kim that they must leave as soon as possible. They get on a bus, but do not know where it is going.

In a cafe, Sugar tells Kim what happened. She was having sex with a man on the beach and, when he finished, his friend tried to have sex with her. Sugar told him to stop; he did not, and she stabbed him with a glass bottle. She asks why nobody falls in love with her. Kim asks if Sugar knows how to steal a car, and they hot-wire one and leave Brighton on the motorway. Kim asks if she can try driving, and Sugar worries about her speed. Kim loses control of the car, and Sugar starts screaming at her. Kim pulls over; Sugar tells her to go home, but Kim tells her she does not have a home to return to. She tells Sugar that she is raped every time she has sex with someone when she is drunk.

Sugar and Kim get back in the car, with Sugar driving. She tells Kim that she will be successful, marrying another woman and living in a penthouse with a view of the New York skyline. Kim tells Sugar that she will also be successful, and Sugar says that when she gets out of prison she will be an overweight heroin addict. Sugar then says that she wants a penthouse, if only for one night. Kim smiles, and tells her to drive.

They arrive in London at an expensive hotel. In the penthouse suite, Kim and Sugar look out the window at the London skyline, share a bath and toast Stella's credit card (used for the room). Sugar says that the champagne is dry, and asks Kim to get some sugar for it. She tries to arouse Kim but Kim rejects her advances, telling her not to do what she does not mean.

Sugar later asks Kim if she would rather be at the hotel with Beth, and Kim says she would rather be with Sugar. Sugar asks who is a better kisser, and Kim is evasive. Kim asks Sugar who she would be with if she could pick anyone in the world. She says she would rather be with Brad Pitt, but Kim would do. Kim asks Sugar why, and why she called her; Sugar says she knew Kim would come. Kim analyses the situation; her life with Sugar would probably never change, with Kim doing things for Sugar and Sugar never reciprocating. She cries at the window, and Sugar apologises. Sugar is rebuffed when she tries to kiss Kim, but says that she means it this time and they kiss.

The next morning, Kim wakes up in bed with Sugar. A police car pulls up in front of the hotel, and Stella and Nathan get out of it with two police officers.

== Series 2 (2006) ==
=== Episode 1 ===
Eighteen months after the events of the first series, Kim is back on the waltzer with two girls. In bed with her electric toothbrush again, she is interrupted by Stella (who asks if she wants an issue of Diva or some K-Y Jelly).

On the pier, Kim bumps into a woman carrying a bag of sex toys and follows her to "Brighton's only women's sex shop". She buys toys over several visits; the shop owner invites to "The CC" ("The Clit Club"), and introduces herself as Saint.

Kim meets Saint at the club. Saint enthusiastically welcomes her, but when Kim sees Saint inviting others equally enthusiastically she realises it is not a date. Kim meets Anna at the bar, who offers to buy her a drink. She flirts with Kim, who tells her that she is a journalist who recently returned from London. Anna asks Kim if she wants to go back to her place, and Kim accepts; Saint, who sees them leaving, is disappointed.

The next morning, Anna takes Kim home and is invited in. They go to the club the next day; Kim also sees Saint, who tries to explain how she feels. When she sees Anna with another girl, she goes home and cries.

Kim visits Sugar the next day, and tells her that Anna dumped her; Sugar says that she is jealous because Kim has a life, and all she has are Kim's visits. Kim sees Saint on the way home, who says she likes her and gives her her phone number.

=== Episode 2 ===
Kim reads her essay in class, but it is not about the book she was supposed to read. She returns to her desk, her books fall off, and Melissa gives her the napkin with Saint's phone number. Kim checks her phone, and Melissa tries to flirt with her. It has been nine hours since Kim left Saint a voicemail, with no reply.

She visits Sugar, gives her drugs, and Sugar tells her she was crazy for calling Saint so soon after getting her number. Melissa startles Kim (who sends Saint a garbled text), and invites Kim to her house to write another essay for class.

Kim wants to call Saint, but goes to the club instead. Saint is the DJ, but Kim does not want to look like a stalker. Kim receives a text message from her.

She visits Sugar, who tells her to get another girlfriend (suggesting Melissa) to make Saint jealous. Kim invites Melissa to her house and tries to get her drunk, but Melissa says that she only drinks water after 6 p.m. Melissa changes into a revealing red dress.

They go to the club. Saint apologises for not being available on Friday, and Kim is unhappy to be stuck with Melissa. She introduces Melissa to Anna. Saint buys Kim a drink, tells her that she knew Melissa was not her girlfriend, and kisses her.

Sugar, about to be reprimanded by the governess, seduces her. Melissa tells Kim that they would be better off as friends.

=== Episode 3 ===
Kim is glad that her and Saint's relationship has lasted 48 hours, but she is worried about satisfying a woman who owns a sex shop. Saint invites her to lunch at Saint's place, above the shop. They watch television, Kim rubs Saint's leg, and they have sex. Kim notices that Saint has a swastika tattoo.

Kim visits Sugar, who tells her that she is getting out of prison early because she slept with a staff member. Sugar asks Kim if she can live with her for a while, because her mother is moving out of Brighton with a new boyfriend. Anna tells Kim that Saint still likes men, but Kim does not believe her.

Kim tells Sugar that she can stay at her house. She then goes to Saint's, where a man opens the door; she hopes that what Anna said is not true. Saint says that Mark is an old friend who was fixing the boiler. Mark calls Saint "Sarah" (her real name). Saint tells Kim that Mark is an ex-boyfriend and they were never serious, but Kim notices that he also has a swastika tattoo.

At Saint's apartment, Kim hears someone in the kitchen and assumes it is Saint; it is Mark, who says he is checking the boiler. Asked how he got in, he says that he still has a set of keys. Saint denies still sleeping with Mark, but Kim does not believe her. She goes home; Saint soon arrives, and they sort things out. Sugar's social worker confirms that Sugar will be sleeping in Kim's room. Saint asks what the difference is between Saint having her ex-boyfriend at her flat and Kim having her ex-girlfriend at her house, and leaves.

Kim and Saint make up. Kim realises that she is supposed to pick up Sugar but decides to stay with Saint, leaving an angry Sugar standing outside the prison.

=== Episode 4 ===
Sugar has moved into Kim's house and must sleep on an air bed. Kim takes Sugar and Saint to the CC, but Sugar leaves. Saint says that Kim should go after her; Kim and Sugar go home and go to sleep. A swingers' magazine addressed to the new neighbours is delivered to Kim's house by mistake. Stella takes it to the neighbours, and Tom flirts with her. He asks if Stella can watch his daughter over the weekend; he is entertaining friends, and his babysitter cancelled.

Sugar has a job at a candy floss stand, the only job she can get. She tells Kim that she would like to meet Saint again. Saint asks Sugar to suggest a place where they could all go, and Sugar says she would like to go where men are. Kim, annoyed that she and Saint cannot be alone together, decides to leave. Saint says that she will stay with Sugar.

Kim learns that Sugar is selling drugs at the candy-floss stand. Sugar lies to Kim that Saint made a pass at her, and Saint tells Kim to sort out the problems between herself and Sugar. Sugar says that she tried to sabotage Kim and Saint's relationship because she feels unwanted at Kim's house. Kim wakes up the next morning to find Sugar walking down the beach with her belongings in two small bags.

=== Episode 5 ===
Kim leaves Sugar a voicemail; she is not at the candy-floss stand, but Kim finds a prostitute's business card with "Sugar Lips" on it. She finds drugs in Sugar's hat, throws them into a drawer, and goes to Saint's shop. Saint is packing, and tells Kim that she is going to a business convention to sell merchandise. Nathan and Stella prepare for the swingers' party, but Nathan is nervous.

Kim, doing homework on her computer, calls Saint and reaches her voicemail. She sees Sugar and a man get out of a car, and Sugar goes into Kim's house. Sugar says that Dmitri took her to London, she could not call, and she is now living there; she looks for the drugs which were in the hat. Kim takes the drugs out of the drawer and throws them on the floor, and Sugar storms out. Stella offers Kim £20 to stay out until midnight. Kim holds out for £50, and Stella tells her to stay out until 1 a.m. After Stella leaves, Kim finds some of the tablets that fell out of the bag she threw on the floor earlier.

She goes to the CC, where many women are dressed as men. She orders a drink, and Montana (Jemima Rooper) is ecstatic to find another woman not dressed as a man. Montana pours her a drink and gives her an Access All Areas sticker so they can meet afterwards; she then sings "You're Gorgeous" onstage. After the performance, Kim meets her backstage and flirts. She tells Montana that she has a girlfriend, but Montana tries to kiss her anyway. Saint sees them kissing, and goes home.

Kim, sitting outside with a bottle of alcohol, takes one of the pills. She is unconscious when Sugar tries to call her, and Sugar leaves a voicemail that the pills are dodgy and she should throw them away. Montana wakes Kim to go swimming, but Kim collapses with nightmarish hallucinations about the people in her life.

Sugar tries to find Kim, but Dmitri says that if she does not go with him he will go home without her. Kim calls Saint and leaves an incoherent voicemail. Saint finally realises that something is wrong, and Kim tells her that she can see the "wreck of loneliness" before passing out.

Kim regains consciousness in a hospital, and a nurse tells her that she is lucky that a friend brought her to the ED in time. When Kim asks who she is talking about, Sugar comes to her bedside. She tells her that the drugs were horse tranquillisers, and Kim (assuming that Sugar took her to the hospital) thanks her and says she needs her in her life. Dmitri calls Sugar, who tells Kim she needs to go. Nathan and Stella arrive, and Kim realises that she has friends and family who care enough to visit (except Saint).

In a flashback, Saint searches for Kim; when she finds her, she calls for an ambulance and tells the operator that Kim is her girlfriend. Saint accompanies Kim to the hospital and tries to call her parents, who are having sex with the neighbours. Saint sits by Kim's bed throughout the night, leaving when the nurse came in in the morning. As she leaves, she sees Sugar in the corridor.

=== Episode 6 ===
Out of hospital, Kim feels terrible for not trusting Saint. Nathan and Stella think that she needs counselling, and pay for a session. Kim does not want to say anything, but eventually tells the counsellor about her problems before the session ends. She goes home with Sugar, because Dmitri's family are staying at his flat. Sugar and Kim go to the Pier; Kim says that she thinks she and Saint are over, because she did not visit her in hospital. She wonders how Sugar found her, and Sugar says that she knows her well. They go to some shops, and Sugar says that Dmitri gave her money and she can buy Kim whatever she wants.

While Sugar is buying plasters, Kim bumps into Saint. She tells Saint what happened, unaware that Saint was there. Saint tries to tell Kim what really happened, but Sugar asks for money. Kim tells Saint that Sugar took her to the hospital, and Saint walks away.

She tells the counsellor that she thinks she has lost Saint, and the counsellor suggests that she speak to Saint in private. Saint goes to Kim's house, and Sugar answers the door. Saint asks when Sugar plans to tell Kim who took her to the hospital. Saint tells Sugar to ask Kim to call her, and gives Sugar a bag to give to Kim. Sugar gives Kim the bag, but not the message. She and Kim share a bottle of vodka. Kim learns about the message, and asks Sugar what else she has lied about; Sugar says that the first time she saw Kim was at the hospital, and Saint brought her. She admits that Dmitri's family are not in the area and she stole the money from him.

Kim runs to Saint's house. Saint tries to get Kim to leave before a woman Saint invited to her flat for casual sex arrives. Kim leaves, punching a woman who is standing outside.

=== Episode 7 ===
Kim, in jail for punching Saint's casual-sex partner, tells a police officer that she would do it again. Saint overhears this, and tells Kim that no one has ever punched someone for her before. At Kim's house, Sugar ignores calls from Dmitri and gets a text message from him asking where his money is.

Saint tells Sugar that she and Kim are back together. Dmitri calls Kim's home phone, asking for the money. When Kim tells him that Sugar is not there, he hangs up and sends Sugar another text. Saint wants to take Kim to Devil's Dyke, and Sugar offers to run Saint's shop; Saint eventually agrees. At Devil's Dyke Saint tells Kim that she loves her, and they agree to be honest with each other about everything.

While Sugar is running the sex shop, she gets constant text messages and phone calls from Dmitri. When Saint and Kim return to the shop, they find it closed in the middle of the day with the cash register empty. Saint and Kim find Sugar at Kim's house, where she says that Dmitri came into the shop and took the money. Saint says that she needs the money to pay the rent the next day, and wants to call the police. Sugar says that she cannot, because she has not complied with the terms of her parole. They think of another way to get the money back.

Sugar and Dmitri are approached at the CC by Saint, who says says she is an old friend of Sugar's. Saint spills a drink on Dmitri, and steals his keys. Sugar gives Kim the keys in the toilets, telling her to look for a shoebox in his wardrobe. Dmitri tells the women that he is going to the toilet, and leaves the club; the barkeep gives Sugar a large bill. Saint calls Kim to tell her that Dmitri is on his way home. Kim finds the money, but hears Dmitri and his dog outside. Dmitri is admitted to the flat block by neighbours and picks the lock of his front door, and Kim hides under Dmitri's bed.

Sugar and Saint arrive at Dmitri's flat; Saint says that the money is not important, and she and Sugar want to have a threesome. Dmitri lets them in, and Saint handcuffs him to the bed. He wants to see them kiss, and Sugar reluctantly kisses Saint. With Dmitri now blindfolded, Kim comes out from under the bed and the three of them leave.

=== Episode 8 ===
Sugar and Kim arrive at Kim's house drunk, and wake up with hangovers. At breakfast, Kim tells Nathan that she is sorry for drinking because she was on antibiotics. Nathan and Stella receive a £400 bill for Kim's counselling sessions.

Kim goes to the CC with Sugar. Sugar meets Mark, and she thinks he is gay until he starts to flirt with her; he then walks away.

At Brighton Pier the next day, Saint tells Kim that she wants to have sex with her in a boat. Sugar meets Mark, who takes her to the Brighton Pavilion. She tells him that she was studying instead of in prison.

Kim is shocked to hear that Sugar did not have sex with Mark, who is okay with Sugar's being in prison. Kim sees leaflets about an "adult playgroup" (a swingers' party) in Saint's shop, and invites her to Sunday dinner.

Nathan tells Stella that they should go to the adult playgroup, and books two places for them. Stella asks Kim to stay with Matt, and she reluctantly agrees.

Mark is putting a sling up for the swingers' group, and gets a text from Sugar. He leaves to meet her, not inserting an important screw. When Nathan and Stella leave, Kim splits the money Nathan gave her with Matt and leaves to meet Saint.

Sugar and Mark walk around Brighton, and she shows him things that mean something to her: where she had her first kiss, her first "shag", and where she first met Kim. She takes him down to the Pier, and shows him where she stabbed a man a year and a half ago (which she had not told him). Sugar tells Mark about the car theft, credit fraud, and fleeing a scene. She tells him that she was in prison and is living off her best friend, has no job, and her mother left her without telling her where she was going; the only things she has are her clothes and a big mouth. Mark kisses her.

Saint gets a text at the CC that something is wrong. Kim asks if she can go with her, and Saint says that Kim has to stay outside. Kim sneaks inside and sees people wearing masks, kissing, and getting spanked. She goes upstairs, and hears a crash. Kim sees Nathan on the ground, moaning in pain; he was on the sling.

=== Episode 9 ===
Kim complains to Saint about Sugar and Mark's relationship, but Saint is annoyed because she received an incorrect delivery. Sugar tells Kim that she and Mark had sex in the disabled toilets of an art gallery, and Stella tries to tell Kim something. Saint tells her that she needs some space. Kim goes to Saint's flat; Mark tells Kim that Saint gets upset around the anniversary of her mother's death, which Kim did not know. She leaves when Saint arrives.

Kim tells Sugar that she knows Sugar is sleeping around and that if she does not like Mark, she should tell him. Sugar tells her that she was secretly having a drink with Stella; Kim is concerned about Stella "grooming" Sugar for a swinger party, but Sugar says that Stella is pregnant.

Stella is smoking, and Kim asks if she should be; Stella puts the cigarette out. She has not told Nathan, the apparent father.

Saint goes to Kim's house, and they have sex in Kim's bed. Kim is jealous of Sugar and Mark's relationship, and Saint guesses that Kim is upset that she did not tell her about her mother. Sugar says that Mark wants her to meet his parents.

Stella tells Nathan she is pregnant, and he thinks she is joking. When he realises she is serious, he tells her that they have struggled with two children and he thought they were going to enjoy life. Stella says that she will call an abortion clinic.

Saint tells Kim that since her mother's death, she has bottled her feelings up and is not used to a close relationship. Nathan and Stella discuss the pregnancy, and he says that if she wants the baby he will not force her to have an abortion.

=== Episode 10 ===
Saint suggests that Kim move in with her, but Kim is uncertain. Stella has trouble giving up smoking. Sugar, after moving out of Kim's house and working at a market stall, is looking for a well-paid job and attends pole-dancing classes. She and Kim try pole-dancing at the CC, but are thrown out by the club's resident dancers. They run into a doorway; Kim kisses Sugar, who does not resist.

The following day, Kim sees Saint and they discuss her moving in. Kim remains reluctant, and Saint withdraws her offer. On the way to Sugar's flat-warming party, Saint says that she is looking for someone to share her life with; she and Kim are at different stages of their lives, and Kim just wants to have a good time. Saint goes home, and Kim goes to the party. She is introduced to BamBam ("she clubbed her social worker over the head with a lamb chop"), who gave Sugar the ketamine that put Kim in hospital. Kim gets drunk, and proclaims that Saint is no longer her girlfriend. BamBam makes a pass at her but Kim is taken away by Sugar, who seems determined that she and Saint stay together. As they reminisce over chips about the night they spent in the hotel, they wonder how things would have turned out if Sugar had not gone to prison. Sugar says that Kim should be with Saint and she and Kim are better off as friends, but her tears belie her words.

Certain now of what she wants, Kim goes to Saint's place and tells her she loves her. As they kiss, the door buzzes. Sugar's flat has burned down because a party guest – Kim, who may not realise it – put a lit cigarette in a bin. Sugar invites herself in, and Kim and Saint wonder whether to let her stay.

== Viewing figures ==
All ratings are 7-day consolidated, sourced from BARB.

=== Channel 4 ===
Most second-series episodes failed to make Channel 4's top 30 programmes during their broadcast week.

Series 1
Episode	Airdate	Viewers (millions)	Weekly rank
1	7 June 2005	2.533	11
2	14 June 2005	1.618	25
3	21 June 2005	2.031	14
4	28 June 2005	1.933	22
5	5 July 2005	1.716	25
6	12 July 2005	1.857	20
7	19 July 2005	1.57	30
8	26 July 2005	1.7	26
9	2 August 2005	<1.75	<30
10	9 August 2005	1.65	29

Series 2
Episode	Airdate	Viewers (millions)	Weekly rank
1	15 June 2006	2.22	25
2	22 June 2006	<1.78	<30
3	29 June 2006	<1.74	<30
4	6 July 2006	<1.77	<30
5	13 July 2006	<1.73	<30
6	20 July 2006	<1.62	<30
7	27 July 2006	<1.47	<30
8	3 August 2006	1.65	28
9	10 August 2006	<1.62	<30
10	17 August 2006	<1.57	<30

=== E4 ===
All episodes except the premiere of each series were broadcast one week before their Channel 4 broadcast on E4.

Series 1
Episode	Airdate	Viewers (millions)	Weekly rank
2	7 June 2005	0.515	3
3	14 June 2005	<0.365	<10
4	21 June 2005	0.384	6
5	28 June 2005	<0.437	<10
6	5 July 2005	<0.386	<10
7	12 July 2005	<0.380	<10
8	19 July 2005	0.363	10
9	26 July 2005	0.384	9
10	2 August 2005	0.505	8

Series 2
Episode	Airdate	Viewers (millions)	Weekly rank
2	15 June 2006	0.658	6
3	22 June 2006	<0.460	<10
4	29 June 2006	<0.494	<10
5	6 July 2006	0.560	10
6	13 July 2006	0.465	9
7	20 July 2006	0.533	2
8	27 July 2006	<0.371	<10
9	3 August 2006	No data available	No data available
10	10 August 2006	<0.463	<10
