= Davyd Harries =

Welsh actor (1937–2026)

- Born: David Harries; 31 January 1937; Porthcawl, Bridgend, Wales
- Died: 23 June 2026 (aged 89); Winterslow, Wiltshire, England
- Education: Royal Academy of Dramatic Art
- Occupation: Actor
- Years active: 1962–2014
- Spouse(s): Anne McPartland (m. 1960, divorced) Pamela Rose Valentine (née Oates) (m. 1984; died 2025)

Davyd Harries (31 January 1937 – 23 June 2026) was a Welsh actor. His memorable roles are as Sgt. Ken Ridgeway in ITV crime drama series Hunter's Walk, Stiva in the 1977 BBC adaptation of Anna Karenina, Frank in Channel 4 teen drama series SWALK, Thomas the Apostle in 1985 miniseries A.D. and D.I. Spalding in soap opera Emmerdale (1998–1999).

== Early life and career ==
After graduating from RADA in 1958, Harries began his career in the theatre. In 1965, he became a member of the Royal Shakespeare Company followed by performing at the Northcott Theatre in 1967.

Entering the television and film industry in 1962, his work has included Softly, Softly, Out of the Unknown, Department S, Thirty-Minute Theatre, Special Branch, The Liver Birds, Budgie, Owen, M.D., Man at the Top, The Rivals of Sherlock Holmes, Arthur of the Britons, Churchill's People, Target, Doctor Who’s The Armageddon Factor, Play for Today, Tales of the Unexpected, Secret Army, Blake's 7, The Gentle Touch, Minder, Strangers, Angels, In Loving Memory, Bergerac, Hannay, The Bill, Casualty, Cadfael, The Chief, Dalziel and Pascoe, Bugs, Coronation Street, Night and Day, Prime Suspect 6, Hollyoaks, Murphy's Law, Hex and The Queen.

In film, he appeared in Under Milk Wood, Overlord and Beautiful Thing.

On stage, Harries has appeared in many productions for Hornchurch Repertory Company and Bristol Old Vic, as well as joining Derek Nimmo's British Airways Theatre, touring the world to places such as the Middle and Far East, appearing in Bedroom Farce and the two-handed Plaza Suite, alongside Marcia Warren.

== Personal life and death ==
While appearing with the Northampton Repertory Company in 1960, Harries married actress Anne McPartland. In 1984, he married writer Pam Valentine, whose credits include the sitcom You're Only Young Twice (of which he guest featured in one episode). They were together for 41 years until her death on 19 October 2025.

Harries died in Winterslow, Wiltshire, on 23 June 2026, aged 89.
