= Olivia Poulet =

English actress (born 1978)

- Born: 9 July 1978 (age 48); London, England
- Education: University of Manchester
- Occupation: Actress
- Years active: 2001–present
- Spouse: Laurence Dobiesz (m. 2015)

Olivia Poulet (born 9 July 1978) is an English actress.

== Early life ==
Poulet was born on 9 July 1978 in south-west London and attended Putney High School. She studied drama at the University of Manchester.

== Career ==
After her graduation in 2001, Poulet landed her first role in the television series The Bill. In 2005, she portrayed Camilla Parker Bowles, now Queen Camilla, in the television film Whatever Love Means. She appeared in the feature film In the Loop in 2009. The same year she portrayed Carol Thatcher in the television film Margaret. She has also had roles in Day of the Flowers, Sherlock, Dappers, The Thick of It, Reggie Perrin and Outnumbered.

Poulet has also appeared on stage productions including The Queef of Terence and The Bird Flu Diaries. She has also voiced roles in video game Dragon Age II by BioWare.

Poulet is an ambassador of The Park Theatre. She appeared in Sarah Rutherford’s Adult Supervision, at the Park Theatre in Finsbury Park.

In 2018, she joined the cast of Holby City playing the hospital's new CEO Abigail Tate.

== Personal life ==
Poulet was in a relationship with fellow actor Benedict Cumberbatch from when they were in the University of Manchester until 2010. She married actor Laurence Dobiesz in 2015.

== Filmography ==
Year	Film	Role	Notes
2001	The Bill	Amanda	TV series (1 episode: "A Week of Nights: Part 1")
2002	Killing Me Softly	Alice's Secretary	
2002	Silent Witness	Alice Gregg	TV series (2 episodes)
2003	The Inspector Lynley Mysteries	Sasha	TV series (1 episode: "A Suitable Vengeance")
2005	The Rotter's Club	Ffion Foulkes	TV series
2005	Friends and Crocodiles	Carol	TV movie
2005	The Little Things You Do	Martha	Short film
2005	Love Soup	Julie Pirelli	TV series (1 episode: "There Must Be Some Way Out of Here")
2005	Whatever Love Means	Camilla Parker Bowles	TV movie
2006	Heroes and Villains	Clare	
2007–2012	The Thick of It	Emma Messinger	TV series (10 episodes)
2008	Secret Diary of a Call Girl	Helen (Mrs. Matt)	TV series (1 episode; series 2, episode 3)
2008	My Zinc Bed	Girl	TV movie; uncredited
2008	Outnumbered	Cousin Julie	TV series (1 episode)
2009	In the Loop	Suzy	
2009	Margaret	Carol Thatcher	TV movie
2009	Reggie Perrin	Tiia	TV series (1 episode)
2009	Stalking Ben Chadz	June	Short film
2010	Dappers	Anna	TV series (1 episode: "Proper Job")
2010	Sherlock	Amanda	TV series (1 episode: "The Blind Banker")
2011	Odem	Ruth	
2011	Day of the Flowers	Lucy	
2012	Mourning Rules	June	Short film
2012	Asylum Seekers	Leah Levine	Short film
2013	Chandide		Short film
2013	Postman Pat: The Movie	Dorothy Thompson	voice
2016	Fresh Meat	Paz	TV series (1 episode)
2016	The Musketeers	Henrietta Marie	TV series (1 episode)
2017	Mad to Be Normal	Maria	
2017–2021	Back	Alison	
2018	Holby City	Abigail Tate	
2019	Death in Paradise	Pippa Mayhew	TV series (S8:E3)
2019	Doc Martin	Julia Pote	TV series (4 episodes)
2023	Significant Other	Cathy	

=== Radio ===
Year	Title	Role	Notes
2020	Tracks - Abyss	Dr. Helen Ash	Lead role

=== Video games ===
Year	Title	Role
2011	Dragon Age II	Charade Amell/Moira/Lady Elegant/Sergeant Melindra/A Friend (voices)
2014	Dragon Age: Inquisition	Josephine's Attendant/Hissing Wastes Charter/Skyhold Resident (voices)

== Bibliography ==
- Poulet, Olivia; Dobiesz, Laurence (2022). 12 hours to say I love you. London: Headline. ISBN 978-1-4722-7115-0.
