= Ambition (novel) =

Ambition is the first novel by Julie Burchill published in 1989 hardback and 1990 paperback, ISBN 9780552135580.

It tells the story of the ambitious if unimaginatively named Susan Street and her efforts to become a newspaper editor. To achieve her goal she is set a number of tasks by a press magnate. These involve her flying around the world to have sex with a large number of men and women while he looks on. It was selected by Sarra Manning for a list of the ten best "dirty books" published in Red Magazine.
