= Stewart Conn =

Scottish poet and playwright

Stewart Conn (born 1936) is a Scottish poet and playwright, born in Hillhead, Glasgow. His father was a minister at Kelvinside Church but the family moved to Kilmarnock, Ayrshire in 1941 when he was five. During the 1960s and 1970s, he worked for the BBC at their offices off Queen Margaret Drive and moved to Edinburgh in 1977, where until 1992 he was based as BBC Scotland's head of radio drama. He was Edinburgh's first makar or poet laureate in 2002–05.

== Works ==
As well as several collections of poetry, his books include a collection of essays and memoir poems, Distances (2001), from Scottish Cultural Press. Most recently he edited 100 Favourite Scottish Poems (SPL/Luath Press, 2006), a TLS Christmas choice, and 100 Favorite Scottish Love Poems (Luath Press, 2008). He has won three Scottish Arts Council book awards, travel awards from the Society of Authors and the English-Speaking Union, and the Institute of Contemporary Scotland's first Iain Crichton Smith award for services to literature. His collection An Ear to the Ground was a Poetry Book Society Choice, and Stolen Light was shortlisted for Saltire Scottish book of the year. A special issue of Chapman magazine was devoted to the work of Stewart Conn, April 1, 2007. The Breakfast Room won the Scottish Mortgage Investment Trust Book Awards Poetry Book of the Year Prize in 2010.

Conn's play Hugh Miller was staged at the Netherbow Theatre on the Edinburgh Festival Fringe in August 1988, with Alec Heggie in the title role.

== Poetry includes ==
Each year links to its corresponding "[year] in poetry" article:

- 1967: Thunder in the Air Akros Publications
- 1967: The Chinese Tower: A Poem Sequence M. Macdonald
- 1968: Stoats in the Sunglight Hutchinson & Co.
- 1972: An Ear to the Ground Hutchinson & Co.
- 1987: In the Kibble Palace Bloodaxe Books
- 1992: The Luncheon of the Boating Party Bloodaxe Books
- 1999: Stolen Light: Selected Poems Bloodaxe Books
- 2001: Distances: A Personal Evocation of People and Places Scottish Cultural Press
- 2005: Ghosts at Cockcrow Bloodaxe Books
- 2007 The Loving Cup Mariscat
- 2010: The Breakfast Room Bloodaxe Books
- 2012 Estuary Mariscat
- 2014: The Touch of Time: New and Selected Poems Bloodaxe Books
- 2016: Against the Light Mariscat
- 2019: Aspects of Edinburgh Scotland Street Press

== Plays include ==
- The Burning (1971)
- Clay Bull
- Greenvoe
- Hugh Miller (1988)
- Mission Boy
- The Aquarium
- The King
- Thistlewood
- Under the Ice
- Play Donkey
- Herman
- I Didn't Always Live Here
