= Chas Newkey-Burden =

British journalist and author (born 1973)

- Born: Charles Philip Newkey Burden; June 1973 (age 53)
- Occupations: journalist and author

Charles Philip Newkey Burden (born June 1973) is a British journalist and author. He has written 29 books, including one co-written with Julie Burchill. Three of the books have been official publications for Arsenal F.C.

Newkey-Burden began his career as a staff writer on 90 Minutes and Shoot. He was chief sub editor on The Big Issue. He has been a contributing editor to Loaded and a columnist for Time Out, Attitude and The Jewish Chronicle. He has interviewed David Beckham, Ricky Gervais, Steve Coogan, Frank Lampard, Alan Shearer, Rachel Stevens and McFly for magazine cover features.

Newkey-Burden was criticised in December 2011 for updating his 2008 biography of Amy Winehouse only a few weeks after her death. To deflect criticism, some of his books are written by "Charlie Burden". In July 2008, Private Eye reported that he had submitted five comically positive reviews of his own books to the Amazon website.

He is a Celtic F.C. fan.

== Bibliography ==
=== Arsenal FC ===
- The All-New Official Arsenal Miscellany, Hamlyn, 2007 – ISBN 0600616622
- Gunners Lists, Hamlyn, 2009 – ISBN 0600618757
- The Official Arsenal Annual, 2005–2012

=== Celebrity biographies ===
- Paris Hilton: Life On The Edge, John Blake, 2007 – ISBN 1844544575
- Amy Winehouse: The Biography, John Blake, 2008 – ISBN 1844545636
- Stephenie Meyer: Queen of Twilight, John Blake, 2009 – ISBN 1844549364
- Heston Blumenthal: The Biography of the World's Most Brilliant Master Chef, John Blake, 2009 – ISBN 1844548201
- Alexandra Burke: A Star is Born, Metro, 2009 – ISBN 1844548104
- Michael Jackson: Legend, Michael O'Mara, 2009 – ISBN 1843174413
- Simon Cowell: The Unauthorized Biography, Michael O'Mara, 2009 – ISBN 1843173905
- The Wanted, Michael O'Mara, 2010 – ISBN 1843175568
- Dannii Minogue, John Blake, 2010 – ISBN 1844549593
- Brad & Angelina, Penguin, 2010 – ISBN 0718157060
- Justin Bieber: The Unauthorized Biography, Michael O'Mara, 2010 – ISBN 1843175231
- Tom Daley: The Unauthorized Biography, Michael O'Mara, 2011 – ISBN 1843176084
- Adele: The Biography, John Blake, 2011 – ISBN 1843586770
- Taylor Swift: The Whole Story, HarperCollins, 2013 – ISBN 9780007544219
- The Wit and Wisdom of David Attenborough: A celebration of our favourite naturalist, 2023 – ISBN 1856755266

=== Humour ===
- The Reduced History of Britain, Andre Deutsch, 2006 – ISBN 0233001905
- The Reduced History of Dogs, Andre Deutsch, 2007 – ISBN 0233002049
- Great Email Disasters, Metro, 2007 – ISBN 1844544109
- Help! I'm Turning Into My Dad!, Prion, 2008 – ISBN 1853756741

=== Miscellaneous ===
- Not In My Name: A Compendium of Modern Hypocrisy, Virgin Books, 2008 (co-written with Julie Burchill) – ISBN 1905264224
- The Dog Directory, Hamlyn, 2009 – ISBN 0600618293
- Crap Towns and Crap Towns II (contributor)
- Loaded's Greatest Ever Englishmen (contributor)
- The Little Book of Michael Jordan: In His Own Words
- The Little Book of Kobe: In His Own Words
