= Low Winter Sun (British TV series) =

- Genre: Crime drama
- Created by: Simon Donald
- Written by: Simon Donald
- Directed by: Adrian Shergold
- Starring: Mark Strong; Brian McCardie; Irene Bagach; Michelle Duncan
- Composer: Martin Phipps
- Country of origin: United Kingdom
- Original language: English
- No. of seasons: 1
- No. of episodes: 2

Production
- Executive producers: Greg Brenman; Kathryn Mitchell
- Producer: Rhonda Smith
- Production location: Edinburgh
- Cinematography: Ulf Brantås
- Editor: Tania Reddin
- Running time: 180 minutes
- Production company: Tiger Aspect Productions

Original release
- Network: Channel 4
- Release: 14 September – 22 September 2006

Related
- Low Winter Sun (2013)

Low Winter Sun is a two-part British crime drama miniseries that first aired on Channel 4 in 2006. It was aired in the United States by BBC America. The series, written by Simon Donald, stars Mark Strong as Detective Sergeant Frank Agnew, a police officer who murders a fellow officer and believes he has committed the perfect crime. The miniseries was later adapted into a 10-episode series by AMC, with Strong reprising his role as Detective Agnew.

== Plot ==
Detective Sergeant Frank Agnew and his colleague DS Joe Geddes kill a fellow detective, Brendan McCann, whom Agnew believes is responsible for the murder of his girlfriend. They stage the crime to make it look like a suicide, but soon their actions spiral out of control and they find themselves caught up in a web of deceit, betrayal, and murder.

== Reception ==
Andrew Anthony of The Observer praised the series, declaring it 'A splendid, if bleak and brutal, piece of stylised realism' and saying 'I doubt that there is an actor working in Britain who does taut and intense better than Strong'.

== Awards and nominations ==
Year	Award	Category	Nominee(s)	Result	Ref.
2007	BAFTA TV Award	Best Drama Serial		Nominated	
2007	BAFTA TV Award	Best Director	Adrian Shergold	Nominated	
2006	BAFTA Awards, Scotland	Best Drama Programme		Won	
2007	Royal Television Society	Best Drama Serial	Tiger Aspect Productions	Won	
2007	Royal Television Society	Best Writer – Drama	Simon Donald	Nominated	
