= Low Winter Sun (American TV series) =

American television drama series

- Genre: Crime drama
- Based on: Low Winter Sun by Simon Donald
- Developed by: Chris Mundy
- Starring: Mark Strong; Lennie James; James Ransone; Sprague Grayden; Athena Karkanis; Ruben Santiago-Hudson; David Costabile; Billy Lush
- Opening theme: "Hustlin' in the Motor City" by Bettye LaVette
- Composer: Tyler Bates
- Country of origin: United States
- Original language: English
- No. of seasons: 1
- No. of episodes: 10

Production
- Executive producers: Chris Mundy; Greg Brenman; Jeremy Gold
- Production location: Detroit, Michigan
- Running time: 43 minutes
- Production companies: AMC Studios; Endemol; Man, Woman & Child Productions; Tiger Aspect Productions

Original release
- Network: AMC
- Release: August 11 – October 6, 2013

Low Winter Sun is an American crime drama television series that aired on AMC from August 11 to October 6, 2013, for one season consisting of ten episodes. The series was developed by Chris Mundy and starred Mark Strong and Lennie James. It is based upon the 2006 British two-part miniseries of the same name which also starred Strong in the same role. Filmed and set in Detroit, Michigan, the series follows detectives Frank Agnew and Joe Geddes after they murder a corrupt cop and attempt to cover it up, and explores organized crime in Detroit. The series received generally mixed reviews and AMC announced in December 2013 that it had canceled the series.

== Cast ==
=== Main cast ===
- Mark Strong as Frank Agnew, a Detroit homicide detective who is strait-laced until he believes his girlfriend is brutally murdered
- Lennie James as Joe Geddes, a veteran Detroit homicide detective who appears to operate on both sides of the law
- James Ransone as Damon Callis, a ruthless crime lord destined to be Detroit's reigning mob boss
- Sprague Grayden as Maya Callis, Damon's just-as-ruthless wife, who seeks to expand their drug and prostitution business
- Athena Karkanis as Dani Kahlil, a Detroit homicide detective hoping to help Frank with his loss, but leery of his actions
- Ruben Santiago-Hudson as Charles Dawson, commander of Frank's precinct, who has survived a lot in his 25 years of service, but this recent corruption scandal could shake him
- David Costabile as Simon Boyd, Detroit police detective and member of Internal Affairs
- Billy Lush as Nick Paflas, a combat veteran looking to be Damon's second-in-command

=== Recurring cast ===
- Alon Moni Aboutboul as Alexander Skelos
- Erika Alexander as Louise "LC" Cullen
- L. Scott Caldwell as Violet Geddes
- Ron Cephas Jones as Reverend Lowdown
- Trevor Long as Sean Foster
- Michael McGrady as Brendan McCann
- Mickey Sumner as Katia
- Ryan Destiny as April Geddes

== Production ==
In October 2011, AMC began developing the series and ordered a pilot in May 2012, with writer Chris Mundy serving as executive producer and showrunner for the series. In August 2012, it was confirmed that Ernest Dickerson would direct the pilot; filming for the pilot began in September 2012 in Detroit. AMC ordered Low Winter Sun to series in December 2012 with a ten-episode order; the series returned to Detroit to film the remaining nine episodes, for which production began in spring 2013. According to Mundy, the state of Michigan approved $7.5 million in incentives for the series' production. Low Winter Sun was reported to create 245 jobs and spend approximately $26 million in the state.

=== Casting ===
James Ransone and Mark Strong were cast in July 2012, with Ransone playing Damon Callis, a member of the Detroit organized crime syndicate and Strong reprising his role as detective Frank Agnew, which he played in the original British miniseries. Ruben Santiago-Hudson, Athena Karkanis, and Lennie James were cast in August 2012, with Hudson playing Charles Dawson, the commander of Frank’s precinct, Karkanis playing detective Dani Kahlil, and James playing a cop named Joe Geddes. Also in August 2012, Sprague Grayden and David Costabile were cast, with Grayden playing Maya, Damon's wife, and Costabile playing Internal Affairs investigator Simon Boyd. Erika Alexander was cast in September 2012, to play the recurring role of Louise "LC" Cullen, a cop in the precinct.

== Episodes ==
No.	Title	Directed by	Written by	Original release date	US viewers (millions)
1	"Pilot"	Ernest Dickerson	Teleplay by : Chris Mundy	August 11, 2013	2.51
Detroit Homicide Detectives Frank Agnew (Mark Strong) and Joe Geddes (Lennie James) murder fellow cop Brendan McCann (Michael McGrady) and stage it to look like a suicide. Neither Agnew nor Geddes claims to know Internal Affairs was already investigating McCann, whose dead body is found in a submerged car along with another corpse.
2	"The Goat Rodeo"	Ernest Dickerson	Chris Mundy	August 18, 2013	1.47
Both bodies found in McCann's submerged car are autopsied. McCann's reveals that he didn't drown in the river, and the other body belongs to Anton Bobek, a butchered Internal Affairs confidential informant. Agnew beats up Geddes to get him to reveal that Agnew's girlfriend Katia is still alive. Meanwhile, Geddes tries to distance himself from Damon Callis' (James Ransone) criminal enterprise and its connections to McCann.
3	"No Rounds"	Andrew Bernstein	Dave Erickson	August 25, 2013	1.23
Prior to McCann's funeral, Geddes recalls the night he witnessed McCann butchering Bobek. McCann tells him to kill Katia and dump her body in the river. Geddes takes her instead across the Canada–US border and releases her to another man after telling her not to return to Detroit nor contact Agnew. He then regrets not killing her. Raymond LeFevre (Richard Goteri) is questioned by Geddes and Agnew after he claims to have seen two men put McCann's car in the river. He cites some pertinent details, some not released to the press, but because of his responses to some of Agnew and Geddes' questions and skeletons in his closet, he is deemed to not be credible, though his arrival pushes the homicide investigation forward. After Alexander Skelos (Alon Moni Aboutboul) gets called in for questioning, he goes to tell Maya not to use The International bar as their crime hub. She voices her concerns about him to Damon.
4	"Catacombs"	Rosemary Rodriguez	Brett C. Leonard	September 1, 2013	1.18
Agnew's search for Katia proves fruitless, but he renews a friendship with Sean Foster (Trevor Long), a former cop turned drug addict. Geddes must deal with his shoplifting daughter, while McCann's connections to the drug empire, specifically dealer Billy Hobson, become clearer. The Callises continue their attempts to get their empire going, dealing with both Reverend Lowdown (Ron Cephas Jones) and Skelos.
5	"Cake on the Way"	Sam Miller	Damione Macedon & Raphael Jackson, Jr.	September 8, 2013	1.06
Agnew, Geddes, and Kahlil search the trap house for clues. Dawson and Boyd arrive to question the house's significance. Agnew suggests both McCann and Bobek may have been killed there. Agnew and Geddes offer their theory to the mayor and his staff: McCann and Bobek were killed by Billy Hobson, who was later killed by an accomplice over a drug sales dispute. Agnew's boxer, Trey (Kamal Angelo Bolden), wins his match and is cheered by the homicide department. Afterwards, Kahlil attempts to kiss Agnew and apologizes when rebuffed. Poppa T (Samuel A. Brice) and his men, on behalf of Reverend Lowdown, storm Damon's hangout to collect money and reprimand Damon for associating with Skelos. Finally, Agnew finds Geddes' name attached to McCann's previous murder cases that have been listed as suicides.
6	"The Way Things Are"	Stefan Schwartz	Ryan Farley	September 15, 2013	1.05
Through a webcast, Agnew tracks Katia to Chicago, where she tells him he was just a customer to her and that her name is not Katia. A newspaper article states Billy Hopson killed McCann. Believing Skelos is framing him for McCann's murder, Damon tells him about killing Billy and using his drugs to start his own business. He asks Skelos for protection and offers to pay double taxes. Skelos rejects the offer. Later, Skelos and Reverend Lowdown meet Damon and his crew at The International to say that they are taking over all of Damon's businesses. Agnew is told to investigate Billy, which reveals a connection to Damon. Kahlil and Agnew have sex, but she later follows up with the witness who saw McCann's car being put into the river.
7	"There Was a Girl"	Catherine Hardwicke	Melanie Marnich	September 22, 2013	1.33
The Callises are brought in for questioning about Billy Hobson and the connection to McCann. Agnew and Geddes want to pin McCann and Bobek's murders on Damon, but they first must get him to confess to Hobson's death. Damon agrees to confess, but only if they set Maya free, adding that he has other information to offer in exchange for a deal. Geddes attacks Damon, who then demands a lawyer. The investigation now in jeopardy, Geddes gets placed on suspension. Later, Agnew tells Geddes that he knows of the suicide coverups and that Kahlil suspects Geddes in McCann's murder. Agnew insists they let the case go cold. Geddes believes that will never happen. Boyd asks a judge for a surveillance warrant of Agnew and Geddes, suspecting they killed McCann.
8	"Revelations"	Adam Davidson	Dave Erickson	September 23, 2013 (AMC on Demand); September 29, 2013	0.87
Agnew and Geddes testify in a murder trial from a previous case. After Agnew secretly contacts Katia via her webcam, he is told their communication has been monitored. Geddes takes his mother and daughter to a Chicago dance performance but skips out to talk with Katia in a highrise hotel room. Agnew searches the webcam house for her, as Geddes tosses her out the hotel window to her death. The Callises discuss what to do about Skelos after receiving a threat from him—Damon wants him dead, but Maya just wants to run away. Boyd takes Dawson to the restaurant to show him where McCann died.
9	"Ann Arbor"	Anthony Hemingway	Rolin Jones	October 6, 2013	0.63
Agnew demands that Dawson resign over the department's corruption, citing the suicide cases. He then makes a series of anonymous phone calls to alert families about their loved ones' wrongful deaths. He also informs Geddes that he is turning them in that day. Agnew confesses to Sean, who has seen the McCann file, and plans to fly to Germany. However, after closing a bank account and shipping the money to his ex-wife Susan, Agnew suffers a minor heart attack and steals a woman's car to drive to Susan's home. Sensing his life is unraveling, he puts his gun under his chin, but she talks him out of killing himself. He later arrives at the station and hears someone has confessed to the murders of McCann, Bobek, and Hobson. He sees Sean sitting in the interrogation room.
10	"Surrender"	Sam Miller	Chris Mundy	October 6, 2013	0.63
Damon and Nick kill Skelos and his driver as the latter wait in their car at a red light. The car is taken to a junkyard and Damon and Nick drive to Flint to hide out. Later, Damon is shot dead by Reverend Lowdown's men. Despite Agnew's attempt to get Sean off the hook, Sean answers every question about McCann. Boyd arrests Agnew for the carjacking, but it is to actually accuse him of killing McCann for his involvement with Katia. Agnew asks for his attorney and ADA Curtright (Sherman Augustus). Agnew tells his attorney to represent Sean and tells Curtright that Boyd's investigation could affect the ongoing murder trial. Curtright agrees and Agnew is released. Agnew puts McCann's prepaid phone in Sean's folder. Boyd explains the entire case to the Mayor and that Agnew and Geddes killed McCann. Dawson says they have their suspect in Sean. Agnew takes a leave of absence after suggesting McCann is responsible for the false suicide cases. He goes to identify Katia's body at the coroner's, but does not know Katia's true name.

== Reception ==
On the review aggregator website Metacritic, the first season has scored 60 out of 100, based on 27 reviews, indicating "mixed or average reviews". Rotten Tomatoes gave the first season a 41% rating based on 32 reviews with an average rating of 6/10. The website's critical consensus is, "Mark Strong makes for a compelling lead, but Low Winter Sun is too serious for its own good, sagging under the weight of its bleak, brooding tone."

In her review for Slate, Willa Paskin found the series derivative of shows such as The Wire, which had a similar setting and tone, and was part of a broader "copycat phase" in American television drama. She defined the issue as, "The easiest way to tell the difference between the good and the bad doppelgangers is to apply a modified-for-TV Turing test: Do the characters on screen resemble actual human beings? The hard-boiled, stressed out, depressed types on Low Winter Sun do not." Alessandra Stanley of The New York Times described the series' tone and storyline as "deadly serious drama, but some of the early scenes are so overwrought that they are almost laughable" and also making comparisons to The Wire. In a 2024 retrospective, Joe Reid of Primetimer was critical of the series and argued it marked a shift in then-trends in prestige television, for grim subject matter and morally grey protagonists, when it ended up underperforming.

== Home media releases ==
The complete series was released on DVD in region 1 on August 12, 2014, and on Blu-ray and DVD in region 2 on October 28, 2013, and in region 4 on December 4, 2013.
