= Julie Burchill =

English writer (born 1959)

- Born: 3 July 1959 (age 67); Bristol, England
- Occupations: Novelist; columnist; broadcaster
- Spouses: Tony Parsons (m. 1979; div. 1984); Cosmo Landesman (m. 1985; div. 1992); Daniel Raven (m. 2004)
- Children: 2
- Writing career
- Period: 1976–present
- Julie Burchill's voice from the BBC programme Desert Island Discs, 10 February 2013.

Julie Burchill (born 3 July 1959) is an English writer. Beginning as a staff writer at the New Musical Express at the age of 17, she has since contributed to newspapers such as The Daily Telegraph, The Sunday Times and The Guardian. Her writing, which was described by John Arlidge in The Observer in 2002 as "outrageously outspoken" and "usually offensive", has been the subject of legal action. Burchill is also a novelist, and her 2004 novel Sugar Rush was adapted for television.

== Early life and education ==
Julie Burchill was born in Bristol and educated at Brislington Comprehensive School. Her father was a Communist union activist who worked in a distillery. Her mother had a job in a cardboard box factory. She did not attend university, leaving the A-levels she had started a few weeks earlier to begin writing for the New Musical Express (NME).

== Writing and broadcasting career ==
=== At the NME ===
She began her writing career at the New Musical Express (NME) in 1976, aged 17, after responding (coincidentally with her future husband Tony Parsons) to an advert in that paper seeking "hip young gunslingers" to write about the then emerging punk movement. She gained the job by submitting a "eulogy" of Patti Smith's Horses. She later wrote that at the time she only liked black music, and said: "When I actually heard a punk record, I thought, 'Oh my Lord! This is not music, this is just shouting'". She left her position at the NME at the age of 20, and started freelancing to be able to write about other subjects, although she has never completely given up writing about pop music.

=== 1980s ===
Her main employers after the NME were The Face and The Sunday Times, where she wrote about politics, pop, fashion and society, and was their film critic from 1984 to 1986. She admitted in 2008 to making up film reviews and missing screenings, and her ex-husband, Cosmo Landesman, has admitted to attending screenings on her behalf.

During the Falklands War in 1982, Burchill argued that the military dictatorship of General Galtieri represented a greater evil. She wrote articles favourable to Margaret Thatcher. Her sympathy for Thatcher helped in gaining a column for The Mail on Sunday, where in 1987 she went against the paper's usual political line by urging its readers to vote Labour. Though she claims to like the MoS, she said of journalists on the Daily Mail in 2008: "Everybody knows that hacks are the biggest bunch of adulterers, the most misbehaving profession in the world – and you have people writing for the Daily Mail writing as though they are vicars ... moralising on single mothers and whatnot."

=== Into the 1990s ===
Burchill has spoken repeatedly and frankly of her relationship with drugs, writing that she had "put enough toot up my admittedly sizeable snout to stun the entire Colombian armed forces". She declared that "As one who suffered from chronic shyness and a low boredom threshold ... I simply can't imagine that I could have ever had any kind of social life without [cocaine], let alone have reigned as Queen of the Groucho Club for a good part of the '80s and '90s." While Burchill has frequently drawn on her personal life for her writing, that self-same personal life has been a subject of public comment, especially during this period, when "everything about her – her marriages, her debauchery, her children – seemed to be news."

In 1991, Burchill, Landesman and Toby Young established a short-lived magazine Modern Review through which she met Charlotte Raven, with whom she had a much publicised affair. "[I] was only a lesbian for about six weeks in 1995," she said in an interview with Lynn Barber in 2004, or "my very enjoyable six months of lesbianism" in a 2000 article. Launched under the slogan "Low culture for high brows", the magazine lasted until 1995, when Burchill and her colleagues fell out. It was briefly revived by Burchill, with Raven editing, in 1997. The "Fax war" in 1993 between Burchill and author Camille Paglia, published in the Modern Review, gained much attention.

In 1995, Burchill wrote a column for The Times, titled "I'm a bitch, and I'm proud", in which she argued that women should reclaim the word 'bitch,' used as a slur. She wrote: "it is the nature of these things that, in recent years, the slighted have taken steps to repossess the slight; thus, we have blacks who call each other 'nigger', pansies who call each other 'queer' and upper-class cretins who quite happily call each other 'Henry'."

In 1996, the actor, author, playwright and theatre director Steven Berkoff won a libel action against Burchill in respect of one of her articles, published in the Sunday Times newspaper, which included comments suggesting that he was "hideously ugly". The judge ruled that Burchill's actions "held him to ridicule and contempt." The late 1990s were a turbulent period for Burchill as she has recalled:

I got the heave-ho from my cushy billet at the Sunday Express, where I later learned my nickname had been "Caligula’s Horse" because my best friend – briefly the editor – had appointed me. For the first time in my brilliant career, no one wanted to hire me. Somehow I limped into a column on the doddering Punch – and then I got the boot from there, too! Surely I had reached the mythical rock bottom at last?

=== From 2000 to 2004 ===
A user of cocaine, sharing in the activity in the company of Will Self among others, she was positive about her use in The Guardian in 2000 when defending actress Danniella Westbrook for Westbrook's loss of her nasal septum because of cocaine use. Journalist Deborah Orr, who was then married to Self, was scathing in The Independent of Burchill and her article: "She does not identify herself as a cocaine addict, so she has no pity for Ms Westbrook." In revenge for Deborah Orr's article, Burchill invented a supposedly long-standing crush on Will Self with the intention of upsetting Orr. A letter in The Independent in June 2000 from the head waitress at the Groucho Club at the time, Deborah Bosley, caused a minor stir. Responding to an article by Yvonne Roberts, Bosley, at the time the partner of Richard Ingrams, a long-standing critic of Burchill, stated that Burchill was merely "a fat bird in a blue mac sitting in the corner" when ensconced at the Groucho.

The following year's Burchill on Beckham (2001), a short book about Burchill's opinions concerning David Beckham's life, career, and relationship with Victoria Beckham, attracted "some of the worst notices since Jeffrey Archer's heyday. 'Burchill is to football writing what Jimmy Hill is to feminist polemics'," wrote one reviewer. According to Robert Winder in the New Statesman: "The book fits in with Burchill's theme of praising the working class; Burchill presents Beckham as an anti-laddish symbol of old working-class values – he reminds her of those proud men of her childhood, 'paragons of generosity, industry and chastity'."

For five years until 2003, Burchill wrote a weekly column in The Guardian. Appointed in 1998 by Orr, while editor of the Guardian Weekend supplement, Burchill's career was in trouble; she had been sacked by the revived Punch magazine. Burchill frequently thanked Deborah Orr for rescuing her. One of the pieces she wrote for The Guardian was in reaction to the murder of BBC TV presenter Jill Dando in 1999. She compared the shock of Dando's murder to finding a "tarantula in a punnet full of strawberries". In 2002 she narrowly escaped prosecution for incitement to racial hatred, "following a Guardian column where she described Ireland as being synonymous with child molestation, Nazi-sympathising, and the oppression of women". Burchill had expressed anti-Irish sentiment several times throughout her career, announcing in the London journal Time Out that "I hate the Irish, I think they're appalling".

She supported the Iraq War, writing in The Guardian in 2003 that she was "in favour of a smaller war now rather than a far worse war later", and criticised those opposed to the war as "pro-Saddam apologists". She justified her stance by stating that "this war is about freedom, justice – and oil" and that because Britain and the United States sold weapons to Iraq that, "it is our responsibility to redress our greed and ignorance by doing the lion's share in getting rid of him".

Burchill left The Guardian acrimoniously, saying in an interview that they had offered her a sofa in lieu of a pay rise. She stated that she left the newspaper in protest at what she saw as its "vile anti-Semitism".

=== From 2005 to 2009 ===
Burchill was an early critic of the fashion for denigrating lower social classes as "chavs". In 2005, she presented the Sky One documentary In Defence of Chavs. "Picking on people worse off than you are isn't humour. It's pathetic, it's cowardly and it's bullying," she commented in an interview for The Daily Telegraph at the time. "It's all to do with self-loathing. ... The middle classes can't bear to see people having more fun, so they attack Chavs for things like their cheap jewellery. It's jealousy, because they secretly know Chavs are better than them. They're even better looking."

Following her departure from The Guardian, in early 2005 she moved to The Times, who were more willing to meet her demands, doubling her previous salary. Shortly after starting her weekly column, she referred to George Galloway, but appeared to confuse him with former MP Ron Brown, reporting the misdeeds of Brown as those of Galloway, "he incited Arabs to fight British troops in Iraq." She apologised in her column and The Times paid damages thought to have been £50,000.

In 2006, The Times dropped her Saturday column, and arranged a more flexible arrangement with Burchill writing for the daily paper. Later it emerged, during a Guardian interview published on 4 August 2008, that eventually she "was given the jolly old heave ho" by The Times, and paid off for the last year of her three-year contract, still receiving the £300,000 she would have earned if she had been obliged to provide copy. She later described her columns for her abbreviated Times contract, which ended abruptly in 2007, thus: "I was totally taking the piss. I didn't spend much time on them and they were such arrant crap."

In February 2006, she announced plans for a year's sabbatical from journalism, planning, among other things, to study theology. In June 2007, she announced that she would not be returning to journalism, but instead concentrate on writing books and TV scripts and finally undertake a theology degree, but she returned to writing for The Guardian newspaper.

Burchill's co-written book with Chas Newkey-Burden, Not in My Name: A Compendium of Modern Hypocrisy, appeared in August 2008, and is dedicated "to Arik and Bibi" (Ariel Sharon and Benjamin Netanyahu). According to Gerald Jacobs, writing for The Jewish Chronicle in 2008, "this book does not merely stand up for Israel, it jumps up and down, cheers and waves its arms". The newspaper described her as "Israel's staunchest supporter in the UK media". When asked if Israel has any flaws, she responded: "Yes. They are much too tolerant of their freaking neighbours, much too reasonable".

She declared in 2005, after Ariel Sharon's withdrawal of Israeli settlers from the Gaza Strip, that "Israel is the only country I would fucking die for. He's the enemy of the Jews. Chucking his own people off the Gaza; to me that's disgusting". Besides writing occasional pieces for The Guardian, she wrote four articles for the centre-right politics and culture magazine Standpoint between July and October 2008.

=== 2010s ===
At the end of June 2010 it was announced Burchill would be writing exclusively for The Independent, contributing a weekly full-page column for the paper. The connection lasted less than 18 months. Burchill wrote her last column for The Independent at the end of October 2011. Admitting he had tried to recruit Burchill for The Sun in the 1980s, Roy Greenslade commented: "my admittedly occasional reading of her columns in recent years has left [me] feeling that she realises her old schtick is no longer working. She has run out of steam – and sympathetic newspaper editors".

Commenting on the Egyptian Revolution of 2011, Burchill wrote in The Independent: "It would be wonderful to think that what replaces Mubarak will be better. But here's the thing about Middle Eastern regimes: they're all vile. The ones that are 'friendly' are vile and the ones that hate us are vile. Revolutions in the region have a habit of going horribly wrong, and this may well have something to do with the fact that Islam and democracy appear to find it difficult to co-exist for long."

On 13 January 2013, Burchill wrote an article for The Observer defending Suzanne Moore after a reference by Moore to transsexuals had been greeted with a great deal of criticism. In Burchill's view, it showed the "chutzpah" of transsexuals to have their "cock cut off and then plead special privileges as women". There were a number of objections to her writing from members of the transgender community and non-transgender community alike. The editor of The Observer, John Mulholland, responded on the comments page to what he described as "many emails protesting about this piece" and stated that he would be looking into the issue. Liberal Democrat MP Lynne Featherstone, formerly a junior Minister for Women and Equalities, called for the dismissal of Burchill and Mulholland in response to the piece. The article was withdrawn from the website the following day and replaced with a message from Mulholland, but reappeared on the Telegraph website. On 18 January, The Observer's Readers Editor Stephen Pritchard defended the decision to remove the article from the newspaper's website, quoting the editor who took that decision as saying "This clearly fell outside what we might consider reasonable. The piece should not have been published in that form. I don't want the Observer to be conducting debates on those terms or with that language. It was offensive, needlessly. We made a misjudgment and we apologise for that".

=== Religion and philo-semitism ===
In her 1987 essay collection Damaged Gods: Cults and Heroes Reappraised, Burchill criticised what she called "the anti-Semitism of politicized American blacks" such as Jesse Jackson, who had referred to New York City as "Hymietown." Burchill wrote, "imagine how the blacks would have gnashed their diamond-studded teeth if a Jewish leader had publicly referred to Harlem as 'Nigger-town'!"

In 1999, Burchill said she "found God", and became a Lutheran and later a "self-confessed Christian Zionist". In June 2007, she announced that she would undertake a theology degree, although she subsequently decided to do voluntary work instead as a way to learn more about Christianity.

In June 2009, The Jewish Chronicle reported that Burchill had become a Friend of Brighton and Hove Progressive Synagogue and was again considering a conversion to Judaism. According to TheJC, she had attended Shabbat services for a month, and studying Hebrew, she described herself as an "ex-Christian", pointing out that she had been pondering on her conversion since the age of 25. Burchill said that "At a time of rising and increasingly vicious anti-semitism from both left and right, becoming Jewish especially appeals to me. ... Added to the fact that I admire Israel so much, it does seem to make sense – assuming of course that the Jews will have me". She wrote in November 2012: "The things I love about the Jews are: their religion, their language and their ancient country".

Burchill clashed with Rabbi Elli Tikvah Sarah of the Brighton and Hove Progressive Synagogue, and the Rabbi's lesbian partner, Jess Woods. Among the reasons for their differences was Rabbi Sarah's defence of Muslims and her advocacy of the Palestinian cause. In Burchill's words, the rabbi "respects PIG ISLAM". Rabbi Sarah told The Independent in September 2014: "The problem is [Burchill] doesn't have any in-depth knowledge. I can imagine her endlessly watching the film Exodus with Paul Newman. She's got a kind of Hollywood view of Jews. You know, 'Jews are so clever, we've survived ...'."

In 2014, Burchill's crowdfunded book Unchosen: The Memoirs of a Philo-Semite was published. Tel Aviv-based writer Akin Ajayi in Haaretz thought "the reactionary solipsism of Unchosen is far removed from the affectionate warmness that a love of the Jewish people can be". Burchill's ex-husband, Cosmo Landesman, considered it to be an "exhilarating and exasperating mix of the utterly brilliant and the totally bonkers". He observes that "there are plenty of Jews Julie doesn't love" including the "millions of Jews around the world who have ever criticised Israel. Her love is blind, deaf and dumb to such an obvious contradiction". Guardian columnist Hadley Freeman wrote: "Burchill divides up the chosen people into Good Jews (hardliners, Israelites) and Bad Jews (liberal Jews) with the enthusiasm of an antisemite. Hilariously, she sets herself up as the Jewishness Police, railing against Jews who are not Jewish enough". In his review in The Independent, Keith Kahn-Harris described Unchosen as "occasionally touching, sometimes bigoted and sporadically hilarious" but that it "often degenerates into EDL-style abuse that lacks any redeeming wit." In The Guardian Will Self wrote, "I'm afraid I can't really dignify her latest offering with the ascription 'book', nor the contents therein as 'writing' – rather they are sophomoric, hammy effusions, wrongheaded, rancorous, and pathetically self-aggrandising."

=== Other books and television programmes ===
Burchill has written novels and made television documentaries. Her lesbian-themed novel for teenagers Sugar Rush (2004) was adapted into a television drama series produced by Shine Limited for Channel 4. Lenora Crichlow's portrayal of the central character Maria Sweet inspired the 2007 sequel novel Sweet. Burchill has made television documentaries about the death of her father from asbestosis in 2002 (BBC Four) and Heat magazine broadcast on Sky One in 2006.

==== Welcome to the Woke Trials ====
Welcome To The Woke Trials: How #Identity Killed Progressive Politics was planned to be issued by Tabatha Stirling of Stirling Publishing in summer 2021 after being dropped by its original publisher following Burchill's defamatory tweets to Ash Sarkar. On 14 March 2021, when referencing her new publisher Burchill announced that, with Stirling, "I've found someone who's JUST LIKE ME." Stirling is alleged to have written a series of articles for Patriotic Alternative as "Miss Britannia", describing her son's school as "a hellhole for sensible, secure White boys" and claimed "there is one member of staff who is openly gay, and I mean RuPaul extra gay". On 16 March 2021, Burchill announced she would not publish her book with Stirling Publishing, the same day she issued a public apology for libel and harassment of Sarkar. The book was subsequently published by Academica Press.

== Responses ==
Burchill has described her style as the writing equivalent of screaming and throwing things. For her novel Sugar Rush her publicist described her as "Britain's most famous and controversial journalist". One of her most consistent themes is the championing of the working class against the middle class in most cases, and she has been particularly vocal in defending 'chavs'. According to Will Self, "Burchill's great talent as a journalist is to beautifully articulate the inarticulate sentiments and prejudices of her readers". For Michael Bywater, Burchill's "insights were, and remain, negligible, on the level of a toddler having a tantrum". John Arlidge wrote in The Observer in 2002: "If Burchill is famous for anything it is for being Julie Burchill, the brilliant, unpredictable, outrageously outspoken writer who has an iconoclastic, usually offensive, view on everything.

In November 1980, former Sex Pistols front man John Lydon gave an interview to Ann Louise Bardach in which he referred to Burchill and Tony Parsons as "toss-bag journalists, desperately trying to get in on something" in response to their book, The Boy Looked at Johnny, and described its chapter on amphetamines as "stupidity". Lydon was incensed by Burchill and Parsons attributing his talent to his alleged use of the drug in their book.

In October 1999, in an article for The Guardian, she wrote: "That young men succeed in suicide more often than girls isn't really the point. Indeed, the more callous among us would say that it was quite nice for young men finally to find something that they're better at than girls". After a previous occasion when Burchill wrote "suicides should be left to get on with it", she "received a small number of letters from people whose sons had killed themselves".

In 2002, her life was the subject of a one-woman West End play, Julie Burchill is Away, by Tim Fountain, with Burchill played by her friend Jackie Clune. A sequel by Fountain, Julie Burchill: Absolute Cult, followed in 2014, with Lizzie Roper in the central role.

In 2003, Burchill was ranked number 85 in Channel 4's poll of 100 Worst Britons. The poll was inspired by the BBC series 100 Greatest Britons, though it was less serious in nature. The aim was to discover the "100 worst Britons we love to hate". The poll specified that the nominees had to be British, alive and not currently in prison or pending trial. In 2005, on the 25th anniversary of the murder of John Lennon, she told The Guardian: "I don't remember where I was but I was really pleased he was dead, as he was a wife-beater, gay-basher, anti-Semite and all-round bully-boy." In the essay "Born Again Cows" published in Damaged Gods (1987), she wrote: "When the sex war is won prostitutes should be shot as collaborators for their terrible betrayal of all women."

On 6 June 2021, and shortly after the announcement of the birth of Lilibet Mountbatten-Windsor, the daughter of the Duke and Duchess of Sussex, Burchill tweeted: "What a missed opportunity. They could have called it Georgina Floydina!", a reference to George Floyd. Her comments were widely condemned, with racial equality activist Shola Mos-Shogbamimu stating: "She's (Lilibet) referred to as 'IT'. The utter disrespect & dehumanisation of #HarryandMeghan children because of their proximity to 'Blackness' is Racist"; actress Kelechi Okafor wrote: "Likening baby Lilibet to George Floyd is to hone[sic] in on the fact she isn't fully white...She refers to Lilbet as 'it' even though it has been announced that the baby is a girl and she could've addressed her as such...Disgusting scenes." On 8 June, via her Facebook account, Burchill announced that she had been sacked by The Daily Telegraph as a result of her online comments.

=== Libel ===
In 2020, Burchill posted a series of defamatory tweets of Ash Sarkar, which included claims that she condones paedophilia and is supportive of Islamist terrorism. Burchill called on her Facebook followers to "wade in on Twitter" against "the Islamists" and the "nonces". As a result of the comments, her publisher, Little, Brown Book Group, cancelled the scheduled publication of Welcome to the Woke Trials, stating that her comments about Islam were "not defensible from a moral or intellectual standpoint".

In March 2021, after being sued for libel and harassment, Burchill retracted her comments, issued a full apology and paid substantial damages to Sarkar, including her legal costs.

Julie Burchill
(@BoozeAndFagz)
tweeted:

On 13 December 2020 I made defamatory statements about @AyoCaesar [Ash Sarkar], which I sincerely regret and retract and have undertaken not to repeat. I have agreed to pay substantial damages to Ash Sarkar and her legal costs. Here is my full and wholehearted apology.

16 March 2021

Burchill stated: "I should not have sent these tweets, some of which included racist and misogynist comments regarding Ms Sarkar's appearance and her sex life." She further apologised for "liking" posts calling on Sarkar to kill herself and promised to refrain from any further harassment of Sarkar.

== Personal life ==
Burchill married Tony Parsons (whom she met at NME) in 1979 at the age of 20. She left Parsons three years later, leaving behind a son, which was followed by years of rancour in the media, described in 2002 as "a steady stream of vitriol in both directions"; she had claimed to have persevered with the "sexual side" of their marriage "by pretending that my husband was my friend Peter York". Her relationships, particularly with Parsons, have featured in her work; Parsons later wrote that "It's like having a stalker. I don't understand her fascination with someone whom she split up with 15 years ago".

Immediately after her relationship with Parsons, Burchill married Cosmo Landesman, the son of Fran and Jay Landesman, with whom she also had a son. The sons from her marriages with Parsons and Landesman lived with their fathers after the separations. Splitting from Landesman in 1992, she married for a third time 12 years later in 2004, to Daniel Raven, around 13 years her junior, and the brother of her former lover Charlotte Raven. She wrote of the joys of having a "toyboy" in her Times column in 2010. Fellow NME journalist/author Paul Wellings wrote about their friendship in his book I'm A Journalist...Get Me Out of Here. She has written about her lesbian relationships, and declared that "I would never describe myself as 'heterosexual', 'straight' or anything else. Especially not 'bisexual' (it sounds like a sort of communal vehicle missing a mudguard). I like 'spontaneous' as a sexual description". In 2009 she said that she was only attracted to girls in their 20s, and since she was now nearly 50, "I really don't want to be an old perv. So best leave it".

She has lived in Brighton and Hove since 1995 and a book on her adopted home town titled Made in Brighton (Virgin Books) was published in April 2007. Her house in Hove was sold (and demolished for redevelopment as high-density flats) around 2005 for £1.5 million, of which she has given away £300,000, citing Andrew Carnegie: "A man who dies rich, dies shamed."

Burchill's second son, Jack Landesman, died by suicide in late June 2015, aged 29. In an article for The Sunday Times Magazine, she wrote of his inability over many years to experience pleasure and the serious mental health issues from which he suffered. In January 2025 Burchill, who currently uses a wheelchair, announced that she may never walk again owing to a spinal abscess.

== Bibliography ==
- The Boy Looked at Johnny, co-written with Tony Parsons, 1978
- Love It or Shove It, 1985
- Girls on Film, 1986
- Damaged Gods: Cults and Heroes Reappraised, 1987
- Ambition, 1989
- Sex and Sensibility, 1992
- No Exit, 1993
- Married Alive, 1998
- I Knew I Was Right, 1998, an autobiography
- Diana, 1999
- The Guardian Columns 1998–2000, 2000
- On Beckham, 2002
- Sugar Rush, 2004 (adapted for television in 2005)
- Sweet, 2007
- Made in Brighton, 2007, co-written with her husband Daniel Raven
- Not in My Name: A compendium of modern hypocrisy, 2008, co-written with Chas Newkey-Burden
- Unchosen: The Memoirs of a Philo-Semite, 2014
- Welcome to the Woke Trials: How #Identity Killed Progressive Politics, 2021
