= Martin Turner (actor) =

English actor

Martin Turner (born September 1950) is an English stage and television actor.

== Early life ==
Turner was born in Hong Kong. In the 1970s he was a member of the Inter-Action Community Arts Trust founded by E. D. Berman, before deciding to train as an actor at the Drama Centre, London, under Yat Malmgren and Christopher Fettes.

== Career ==
=== Theatre ===
On the West End stage, he played Juror 11 in Twelve Angry Men at the Garrick Theatre.

In 2019, he played the Doctor in Florian Zeller's The Son at The Duke of York's Theatre.

=== Television ===
His featured roles on television include portraying Lord Chamberlain in The Crown. and he played [beautifully] the role of John Harrison in Agatha Christie's Poirot 'Wasps' Nest'[1989].
