= Huntington's disease in popular culture =

Huntington's disease (HD) has been shown in numerous formats, more so as awareness of the condition has increased. Here is a list of references to it in popular culture:

== Books ==
- Ann Brashares's 2011 novel Sisterhood Everlasting (later found one of the four "sisters", Tibby Rollins, had HD)
- Emma Brodie's 2026 romance novel Into the Blue, it is revealed that the male love interest Noah Drew has Hutington's
- James S. A. Corey's 2015 novella The Vital Abyss, part of The Expanse book series (reveals the backstory of the former Protogen researcher Paolo Cortázar, whose mother was diagnosed with "Type C Huntington's" in his adolescence, which was the primary impetus for his becoming a research scientist).
- Lisa Genova's 2015 novel Inside the O'Briens (relates the slow development of HD in the main character, a Boston police officer, and its effects on his identity, work, and family)
- Joe Klein's Woody Guthrie: A Life: The book discloses the effects of the disorder in both Woody Guthrie and his mother.
- Ian McEwan's 2005 novel Saturday. The character of Baxter is negatively portrayed in his affliction.
- Charity Norman's 2022 novel Remember Me, in which Huntington's is a central plot element.
- Nick O'Donohoe's Crossroads books (BJ Vaughan has HD).
- Charlotte Raven's 2021 memoir Patient 1 which describes her becoming affected by Huntington's and participating in a clinical trial of the drug tominersen.
- Kathy Reichs' 2020 novel A Conspiracy of Bones
- Ruth Rendell, writing as Barbara Vine, 1989 British novel The House of Stairs (main character Elizabeth Vetch is at risk).
- Robert J. Sawyer's 1997 novel Frameshift (main character Pierre Tardivel).
- Steven T. Seagle's autobiographical 2004 graphic novel It's a Bird... features the author coming to grips with the presence of HD in his family.
- Dorothy Norvell Snyder's semi-autobiographical 1980 novel Heirloom: A Novel, How One Family Lived with One of Life's Cruelest Diseases—Huntington's.
- Mary Helen Specht's 2015 novel Migratory Animals.
- Jacqueline Susann's 1966 novel Valley of the Dolls (night club singer Tony Polar).
- Diane Tullson's 2001 novel Saving Jasey (Trist, Jasey and their grandfather).
- Kurt Vonnegut's 1985 novel Galapagos.
- Nancy Werlin's 2004 novel Double Helix (Ava Samuels (mother of the protagonist), Kayla Matheson and others).
- Walter Jon Williams' 1986 cyberpunk novel Hardwired features a genetically engineered, virally-transmitted version of Huntington's.

== Films ==
- In the 1967 film Valley of the Dolls, Tony Polar, the singer married to Jennifer North, has Huntington's Chorea.
- Arlo Guthrie's 1969 film Alice's Restaurant, which depicts Guthrie's father Woody suffering from what was then called "Huntington's Chorea", and features numerous mentions of the condition by the younger Guthrie to his peers and the draft board's medical staff.
- Broken Elf, a 2010 documentary by Robert Ciesla featuring Jukka, an alcoholic man with advanced Huntington's disease. Screened at Reikäreuna Film Festival, September 7, 2013
- Do You Really Want to Know?, a 2013 documentary by John Zaritsky featuring Huntington's disease researcher Jeff Carroll
- Huntington's Dance a 2014 release by Chris Furbee an 18-year-long journey with a family affected by Huntington's Disease. World Premiere at Slamdance, January 19, 2014
- The Lion's Mouth Opens, a 2014 documentary by Lucy Walker (director) featuring filmmaker Marianna Palka
- The Inheritance, a 2014 documentary film
- The Faith of Anna Waters, a 2016 horror movie released in the U.S. as The Offering, depicts a crime reporter whose sister dies of Huntington's and whose niece inherits it as does, eventually, she as well.
- In the 2024 crowdfunded science fiction film Space Command Redemption, Vonn Odara tells Captain Kemmer that she was diagnosed with Huntington's Chorea before they found a cure.
- The 2024 Bob Dylan biopic A Complete Unknown depicts Woody Guthrie as he suffers from Huntington's disease.

== Television ==
- Sammy Davis Jr. in the 1970 episode "Song of Willie" from the series The Mod Squad
- Dr Ethan Hardy in BBC drama series Casualty.
- Joseph Campanella in the 1970 episode "Dance to No Music" from the series Marcus Welby, M.D.
- Edward Dunglass, the goth teen from the Australian soap opera Home and Away (1999–2000)
- The 2018 thriller series Philharmonia has the mother and grandmother of the central protagonist, Helene Barizet, being victims of Huntington's disease. Thus questions about her sanity play a part in the plot.
- Dr. Samantha O'Hara from the Australian medical drama All Saints
- Hannah's father from the American drama Everwood, as revealed in the episode "Need to Know" (3x10)
- Characters in the episodes "Pad'ar" (3x08) and "the Sins of the Father" (4x03) of Gene Roddenberry's Earth: Final Conflict.
- Angie Padgett from the episode "In Which Charlotte Goes Down the Rabbit Hole" (1x06) of Private Practice.
- Dr. Remy "Thirteen" Hadley, one of the doctors who joins House's second team on House. Her mother died of Huntington's disease when she was a child. During the season 4 finale, Hadley discovers she also has the disease. In season 7 it is revealed she assisted her brother in killing himself when his Huntington's symptoms got too bad.
- An episode of the BBC drama Waterloo Road
- In the season 8 finale of Scrubs, a woman is diagnosed with Huntington's disease, and her son has to make the decision to find out whether or not he also has the condition.
- In The Bold Ones: The New Doctors, Dr. Paul Hunter counsels a pregnant woman whose irritable husband is found to have the disease. After explaining the 50-50 odds, he advises her to have the baby, trusting in the advance of medical science.
- The episode "Second Sight" of the third season of Without a Trace ends with the revelation that the disappearance and kidnapping of the girl Malone's team was searching for, was in truth an elaborate set-up so that she could return to her estranged gypsy family – a decision she took after discovering she had the disease, inherited from her grandmother. Knowing she just wants to live the time she has left with her parents, Malone lets her and her father go.
- In a season 4 episode of Breaking Bad, Walter White shares a childhood memory of his father who died of Huntington's disease with his son.
- In the season 3 premiere episode "Fear" (aired September 29, 2013) of the ABC series Revenge, the character of Conrad Grayson, played by Henry Czerny, is seen passing out during a political speech. In the very next scene, a doctor informs him that he has Huntington's disease.
- "Fighting Huntington's Disease", a 2010 episode of the CBC News Network documentary series Connect with Mark Kelley, depicted the life and work of Huntington's disease researcher and advocate Dr Jeff Carroll, himself a carrier of the genetic mutation that causes Huntington's disease. The episode was nominated for a Gemini award for 'Best Lifestyle/Practical Information Segment.
- David Collins was a fictional character in the BBC soap opera EastEnders in 2004. He was played by Dan Milne. David was the husband of Jane Collins. He had Huntington's disease and lived in a hospice. Jane kept David a secret from her new boss Ian, but one day Ian demanded to know why she was infrequent with her work, and Jane took him to meet David. Ian regularly visited him until David died shortly after Christmas 2004, leaving Jane heartbroken.
- In the second episode of the second season of BBC's Ripper Street, HD (referred to as Huntington's Chorea) and the possibility of it being passed on in a prominent family are the cause of the death of a woman and the stealing of her child by the patriarch of the family. His son had been diagnosed with HD and is the father of the stolen child. The patriarch took the child to make sure that HD ended with his son, his intention being to kill the child if signs of the disorder manifested themselves.
- Season 2, Episode 3 of Drop Dead Diva, Gloria Rubens plays a professor that petitions the court to be cryogenically frozen before the disease causes too much irreversible damage.
- Season 7, Episode 3 of Call the Midwife, An expectant mother is diagnosed with the degenerative neurological disorder Huntington's disease, and quickly deteriorates to the point where she is unable to look after her children. Her eldest daughter too is diagnosed, and placed in a hospice.
- Season 2, Episode 15 of The Rookie, Colin has Huntington's disease and Rachel may have it too but she's refused to get tested because she doesn't want to know. Colin thinks that because Bradford is committed to the job, he'll never be able to take care of Rachel the way she may need one day.
- In the Amazon Prime series ZeroZeroZero Chris Lynwood has Huntington's disease. The show reveals that Chris and his older sister Emma (played by Andrea Riseborough) lost their mother to the disease, which the now-30-year-old Chris inherited from her.
- The 2020 Ken Burns documentary The Gene: An Intimate History discussed Huntington's disease, including the discovery of the gene and interviews with Nancy Wexler and other prominent scientists involved in Huntington's disease research and drug development.
- In the Australian soap opera Neighbours, Chloe Brennan and her mother Fay Brennan both have Huntington's. Fay died due to complications caused by the disease in episode 8573 in 2021.
- Season 1, Episode 8 of Pooch Perfect Contestant Corina reveals she has Huntington's disease.
- In Season 58, Episode 163 of the soap opera General Hospital, Britt Westbourne finds out she may have Huntington's disease.
- In Season 2, Episode 3 of the science fiction show The Expanse, it is revealed that Paolo Cortázar's mother died from Huntington's disease.
- In Season 3 (1995), Episode 7 ("Family Ties") of the British TV show Peak Practice, Jack becomes involved in the plight of Nancy who has Huntington's disease. He is concerned about her when she tries to take her life. Jack tracks down her sister who hasn't visited Nancy for years because she is scared she too may have the illness. Jack is alarmed when Nancy's sister reveals that Nancy has a son who doesn't even know he's at risk from having Huntington's disease.
- In Season 6 (1988), Episode 129 ("Curtains") of the TV show St. Elsewhere, Dr. Morrison counsels a family about genetic testing and Huntington's disease.
- In Season 8 (1997), Episode 7 ("Out of the Blue") of the TV show Baywatch, Mitch tries to get Jordan to meet her real biological mother on a fishing outing, who's dying from a brain disorder and thinks the problem is hereditary. It turns out to be Huntington's Disease.
- In Season 3 (2002), Episode 6 ("Old Wounds") of the TV show The District, Nancy is diagnosed with Huntington's disease after falling from a fire escape and having a concussion while chasing a criminal.
- In Season 2 (2009), Episode 1 ("Gilted Lily") of the TV show In Plain Sight, Lily is laid out serenely on the bed. Her note says she found her birth father years ago, and discovered he died of Huntington's Disease, that she started showing symptoms a few months ago and that she wants her kids to remember her as she was.
- In the Barbara Walter's ABC News Special (1990) A Perfect Baby, Walters shows the ravages of Huntington's disease, which does not appear until middle age and then destroys its victims both physically and mentally.
- In Season 7 (2010), Episode 4 ("Can't Fight Biology") of the TV show Grey's Anatomy, Meredith is treating a woman, Lila, who eventually reveals that she has Huntington's Disease.
- In Season 1 (2022), Episode 1 of the FX Cable TV series The Old Man, Dan Chase played by Jeff Bridges is a widower whose wife died from Huntington's Disease.
- In Season 4 (2022), Episode 12 ("The Long Goodbye") of the Netflix series Virgin River, Denny reveals to Lizzie that he is suffering from Huntington's disease which is the true reason he needs the medication Klonopin — which helps to ease muscle tremors, rigidity and anxiety in Huntington's patients.
- In Season 2 (2022), Episode 16 ("Champagne Problems") of the CW TV series Walker, Cassie tells Ben that after they learned Lucas had Huntington's (disease), she couldn’t handle it.
- In Season 3 (2018), Episode 3 ("Snakeskin") of the Australian TV series Wanted, Lola and Chelsea take refuge with an eccentric loner. Lola struggles with her past, while Chelsea hides her Huntington's symptoms. Unbeknown to them, both Brady and Maxine close in.
- In Season 14 (2017), Episode 12 ("Off the Grid") of the CBS TV series NCIS, Bodie is revealed to have been suffering from Huntington's disease. Given the hereditary nature of the disease, it is likely that Ramsay also suffers from it. The team uses that, along with cell phone data, to track down Ramsay.
- In Season 6 (2000), Episode 16 ("Viable Options") of the NBC TV series ER, Dr. Mark Greene tells a patient that he has Huntington’s disease and that it’s genetic and that there is no cure. He also says that that might be why his father committed suicide. The patient worries that he might have passed on this trait to his daughter.
- In Season 9 (2002), Episode 3 ("Insurrection") of the NBC TV series ER, a late-stage Huntington's disease patient is rushed into the Emergency Room of a hospital. During the chaos caused when Dr. John Carter leads a walk-out to protest unsafe working conditions, the man's mother disconnects his ventilator so that he can die in peace. Dr. Susan Lewis figures out what the mother did but protects her.
- In Season 4 (2018), Episode 5 ("What You Don't Know") of the NBC TV series Chicago Med, Dr. Charles identifies Keith's illness as Huntington's. Keith admits the diagnosis, telling Daniel that there is no cure and that he wants to die before his Huntington's progresses further.
- In Season 7 (1993), Episode 11 ("Bare Witness") of the NBC TV series L.A. Law, Gwen tells Daniel that she had a blood test for Huntington's chorea. That it's hereditary, hidden in midlife, causing lack of coordination, then mental deterioration and finally death. And that there's a 50/50 chance, she doesn't have it.
- In Season 4 (2023), Episode 15 ("Donors") of the Fox TV series 9-1-1: Lone Star, Robert reveals that he was diagnosed with Huntington's Disease.
- In Season 1 (2025), Episode 2 ("Redcoat") of the CBS TV series Watson, Watson and his team find out that Andrew recently learned he might have Huntington's Disease, a serious illness that runs in his family. Watson thinks Andrew faked the shooting so his family could get his life insurance money.

== Video games ==
- In the "Cold, Cold Heart" DLC for Batman: Arkham Origins, it establishes the cause of Nora Fries' terminal illness to be Huntington's chorea.

== Radio ==
- Mind Matters: RTÉ Radio 1 programme on Huntington's Disease, featuring a family affected from Ireland.
- Huntington's disease - two part ABC Radio National "The Health Report" program on the disorder examines the effects on families and the challenges it presents for the health system and society. (part 2)
- Dr. Gilmer and Mr. Hyde - This American Life report on a man imprisoned for life for a murder committed while undiagnosed with Huntington's disease.
- "What Are You Doing For The Test of Your Life" - This American Life segment from the episode titled "It Says So Right Here": a report on a woman who has several family members who either have had or have been tested positive for Huntington's Disease and is going through the process of being tested.
