= Jeff Carroll =

American scientific researcher (born 1977)

- Jeff Carroll in Prague, 2009
- Born: Jeffrey Bryan Carroll; August 28, 1977 (age 48); Seattle, Washington
- Occupation: Scientific researcher
- Known for: Huntington's disease research and advocacy

Jeffrey Bryan Carroll is an American scientific researcher in the field of Huntington's disease (HD). As a carrier of the abnormal gene that causes HD, he is also a public advocate for families affected by the disease, and co-founder of the HD research news platform HDBuzz. His life and work were the subject of a 2011 Gemini award-nominated CBC documentary feature. Carroll is an associate professor of neuroscience in the Department of Biology at the University of Washington

== Early life and family history ==
Born in Seattle on August 18, 1977, to parents Cindy and Jim, Carroll is one of six siblings. He joined the US Army in 1998, serving in Kosovo. While serving in the army, Carroll's mother was diagnosed as suffering from Huntington's disease (HD), a fatal, incurable, genetically inherited neurodegenerative illness. Learning that he and his siblings were each at 50% risk of having inherited the genetic abnormality that causes HD, and having no scientific background, Carroll enrolled in an Army-sponsored basic biology course, initiating a career as a neuroscientist.

Carroll underwent genetic testing for Huntington's disease in 2003 and received a positive result, indicating that he will succumb to the disease at some time, unless effective treatments are found.

== Scientific career ==
On leaving the US Army in 2001, Carroll joined an undergraduate biology program at the University of British Columbia, Vancouver, followed by a doctoral program in UBC's Centre for Molecular Medicine and Therapeutics in the laboratory of Dr Michael Hayden. Carroll gained a PhD in 2010 for his research into Huntington's disease, including work on the YAC128 HD mouse model, the role of caspase 6 in HD, genetic variation in the human HD gene and the potential of allele-specific gene silencing using antisense oligonucleotides as a treatment for the condition.

As a postdoctoral researcher, Carroll worked in the laboratory of Dr Marcy MacDonald at Harvard University on metabolic abnormalities in Huntington's disease before moving to Western Washington University in 2011 where he is a visiting professor in the Department of Psychology and continues to conduct research into Huntington's disease. In 2022, he moved as associate professor at the Department of Neurology in the University of Washington.

== Huntington's disease advocacy ==
Accurately communicating research to the affected community is a moral obligation of the scientific community ... a work of science isn't complete until this has been done.

— Jeff Carroll, Trends in Molecular Medicine, 2011

As a carrier of the gene that inevitably causes the fatal condition that forms the subject of his scientific research, Carroll is a frequent speaker at scientific and patient conferences and congresses, on issues relating to living at risk of HD, the mutual interdependence of science and patient communities, preimplantation genetic diagnosis and the controversial issue of predictive genetic testing for HD. He delivered keynote addresses at the 2009 World Congress on Huntington's Disease in Vancouver and the 2010 Annual Convention of the Huntington's Disease Society of America.

Carroll is also a prominent scientific educator and an advocate for accessible education of the public by scientists. In an editorial in the scientific journal Trends in Molecular Medicine, he argued that "accurately communicating research to the affected community is a moral obligation of the scientific community ... a work of science isn't complete until this has been done." Alongside clinical researcher Dr Ed Wild and Emmy award-winning journalist and HD patient advocate Charles Sabine, Carroll has delivered plain-language digests of research news for patients and family members at major scientific conferences, including the 2009 and 2011 World Congresses on Huntington's Disease in Vancouver and Prague, and the 2010 European Huntington's Disease Network Annual Congress.

In 2010, Carroll's life, work and family were the subject of an episode of the CBC News Network documentary Connect with Mark Kelley, entitled "Fighting Huntington's disease". The episode was nominated for a Gemini Award for 'Best Lifestyle/Practical Information Segment'.

In 2011, with financial support from the national Huntington's disease lay organizations of the US, Canada, England & Wales, Scotland and Germany, Carroll and Wild co-founded HDBuzz, an online source of accessible news about Huntington's disease research, written by scientists. HDBuzz was awarded the HD Association of Northern Ireland's 2011 Award for Scientific Communication and the 2012 Michael Wright Community Development Award from the Huntington Society of Canada. HDBuzz was the subject of an article in the scientific journal Trends in Molecular Medicine in October 2011 entitled 'HDBuzz: empowering patients through accessible education'.

Carroll's life, family and research were the subject of the 2012 documentary feature film Do You Really Want to Know?, directed by Academy Award-winning Canadian film maker John Zaritsky and screened at the DOXA Documentary Film Festival. The film won several awards, including Best Documentary at the 2012 Okanagan Film Festival, Best Science / Medicine Technology Documentary and Best Non-fiction Director at the 2012 Yorkton Film Festival and Best Science / Technology Film at the 2012 Columbus International Film Festival. Carroll was also the subject of a November 2012 feature on CBC radio show DNTO.

Along with HDBuzz co-founder Dr Ed Wild, Carroll received the 2012 Michael Wright Community Development Award from the Huntington Society of Canada.

== Family life ==
Carroll lives in Seattle, Washington with his wife Megan and two children, Billie and Elijah (born June 27, 2006), non-identical twins born through in-vitro fertilization using pre-implantation genetic diagnosis to ensure that they did not inherit a risk of Huntington's disease.
