= The Inheritance (2014 film) =

2014 documentary feature film directed by Jeffrey McDonald

The Inheritance is a 2014 documentary feature film about Huntington's disease written by Bridget Lyon and directed by Jeffrey McDonald. Based in New Zealand and telling the story of Lyon's family, it features interviews with prominent researchers and advocates in the Huntington's disease field including Charles Sabine, Michael R. Hayden, Jeff Carroll and Edward Wild. It premiered at the 2014 New Zealand International Film Festival and has attracted media coverage in New Zealand and Australia.
