= Charles Sabine =

British television journalist

Charles Sabine OBE
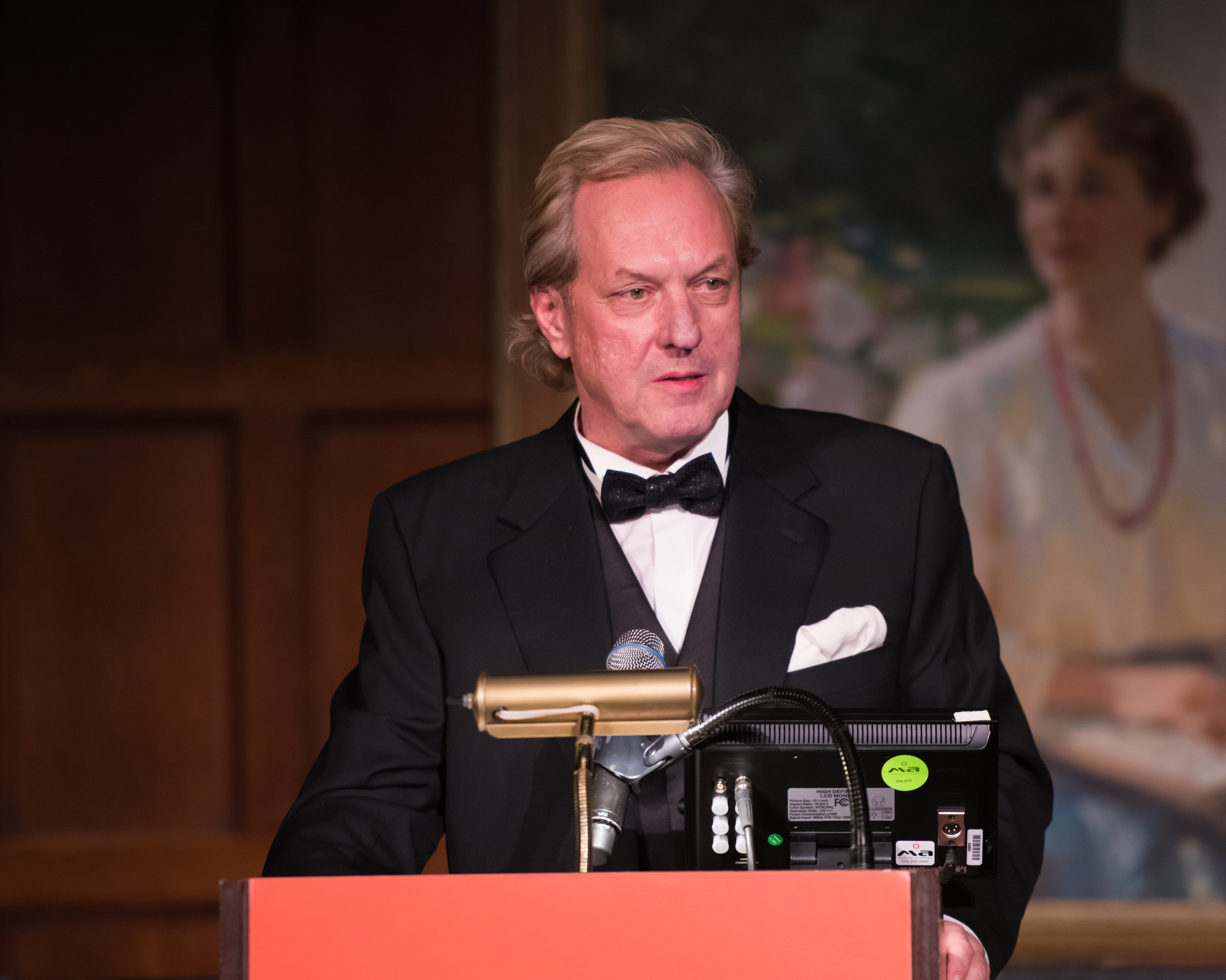
- Charles Sabine at the Harvard Club, New York City, October 2019 (HDF Gala)
- Born: 20 April 1960 (age 66); Rinteln, West Germany
- Occupation: Television journalist
- Television: NBC News
- Awards: Emmy Award News & Documentary category (1989)

Charles Edward Sabine OBE (born 20 April 1960) is a British television journalist who worked for the US Network NBC News for twenty-six years, before becoming a global spokesman for patients and families with degenerative brain diseases. He is active throughout advocacy and charity sectors across four continents and founder of the Hidden No More Foundation. He has 2 children, Roman and Sabrina.

== Early life and career ==
Sabine joined NBC in 1982 in London, and worked as a writer at 30 Rock in Manhattan, New York, in 1987. He then transitioned to field production in conflicts and according to NBC Universal, “Sabine participated in most of the major international news stories of the next two decades”.

As producer of the NBC Nightly News with Tom Brokaw's team coverage of the Romanian Revolution, Sabine received an Emmy Award for his program segments which aired in December 1989, in the Outstanding General Coverage of a Single–Breaking News Story category of the News & Documentary Emmy Awards.

During his time in the field, Sabine conducted three tours on CVN-71 nuclear-powered aircraft carriers at battle stations, USS George Washington (the Adriatic), the USS Theodore Roosevelt (Mediterranean) and the USS Enterprise (Arabian Sea).

He was the last western journalist to interview the founder of Hamas, Sheik Ahmed Yassin in a secret location in Gaza.

The thirty-five countries and territories from which Sabine reported conflicts for NBC News, include the allied Gulf Wars in Iraq, Saudi Arabia and Kuwait; wars in Bosnia, Croatia, Serbia, Kosovo and Chechnya; the US invasion of Haiti; the Genocide in Rwanda; the Ebola outbreak in Zaire; revolutions in Poland, Romania, Hungary and Czechoslovakia and sectarian conflicts in Lebanon, Gaza, the West Bank, Syria, Pakistan, South Africa and Northern Ireland.

Sabine, as producer of the team coverage of the Romanian Revolution, received an Emmy Award for his program segments which aired in December 1989, in the Outstanding General Coverage of a Single–Breaking News Story category of the News & Documentary Emmy Awards.

== Advocacy ==
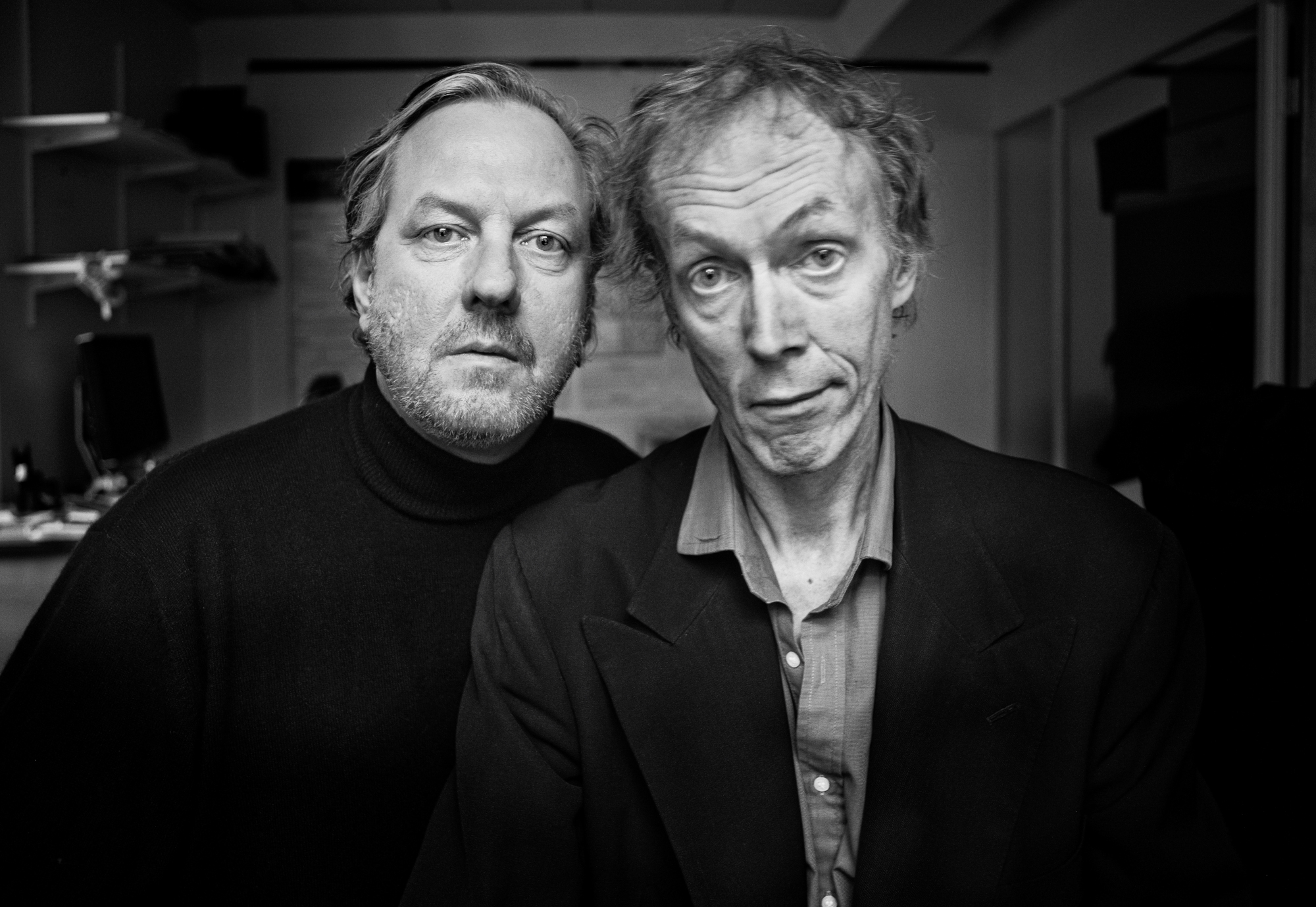
Charles Sabine with his brother John in London, February 2010. John, five years older than Charles, also had HD.

In 2006, between tours of Iraq for NBC, Sabine tested positive for the expanded Huntington's gene. His father, uncle, half-brother and brother John, would all die of Huntington's disease (HD). John, five years older than Charles, was, before he became symptomatic, an Oxford graduate and barrister in London.

In interviews, Sabine has described why he then chose to use what remaining time he had, to switch battlefields from Baghdad to the one facing HD families due to unparalleled misrepresentation, discrimination and prejudice: “My neurologist said: ‘there is nothing you can do about this disease, just live your life as well as you can.’” Sabine relates. In the coming months, however, he realised that: “The neurologist was completely wrong. There is everything I can do about this disease. The problem, is finding the time to do it all.”

Among keynote lectures across four continents, Sabine has spoken at the Royal Society, the European Parliament, the World Congress for Freedom of Scientific research, the Italian Senate, the Harvard Club, and the International School for Advanced Studies in Trieste (SISSA). Sabine has become one of the foremost lay opinions on the ethics of future scientific research.

Jennifer Doudna, Nobel Laureate and inventor of CRSPR gene editing, closed her 2017 ‘TED’ treatise on the ethics of gene editing with a quote from Sabine:

“Above all else, we must respect people’s freedom to choose their own genetic destiny and strive for healthier, happier lives ... As Charles Sabine … put it, “Anyone who has to actually face the reality of one of these diseases is not going to have a remote compunction about thinking that there is any moral issue at all.” Who are we to tell him otherwise?”.

Sabine contributed to the drafting of the late Senator Edward Kennedy's last act of legislation—the Genetic Information Nondiscrimination Act ("GINA"), designed to protect the rights of individuals with genetic predispositions in the American workplace and in insurance.

Sabine was an active lobbyist in the successful implementation of the UK's Human Fertilisation and Embryology Act 2008. The 50th Anniversary of Canada's Gairdner Foundation in 2009, attended by 22 Nobel Laureates, was marked by a debate between Sabine and Nobel Laureate Sydney Brenner about the future of personalised genomics. In 2009 he was the star guest at the Italian National Telethon, for which a film about him was produced by Rai Cinema.

Sabine is a spokesperson for Huntington's disease lay associations around the world, among them:

- USA: Huntington's Disease Society of America
- UK: Huntington's Disease Association

Sabine is a member of the Global Advisory Council of the International Society for Stem Cell Research.

Sabine is Consulting Publisher to the Huntington's disease research news web platform HDBuzz, founded by Dr Jeff Carroll and Dr Ed Wild.

Featured in the 2013 documentary Alive & Well, Sabine discusses his advocacy work to raise awareness of Huntington's disease.

Excerpts from Sabine speeches were used by James K Wright in his song "Spring in your Step".

In her 2022 New Year Honours list, the Queen awarded the Most Excellent Order of the British Empire (OBE) to Sabine, "Philanthropist and Global Campaigner, Huntington’s Disease for Charitable and Voluntary Services". The first time in history of such awards that the words 'Huntington's disease' have been used in a citation for an OBE.

== Hidden No More ==
Sabine is Founder of the Hidden No More Foundation. Its mission is to "empower and enable patients and families facing Huntington's disease, to step out of the shadows of shame, stigma and fear. Huntington's is often described as the 'harshest affliction known to mankind,' but unlike other diseases, the daily suffering it inflicts, is uniquely compounded by the fact that the vast majority of those families carrying the HD gene, feel compelled to hide that reality."

The first Hidden No More event took place on 30 June 2010, when more than a year of campaigning and fundraising by Sabine in partnership with Sir Michael Rawlins culminated in the launch of an All-Party Parliamentary Group for Huntington's disease in the UK Parliament. Chaired by Lord Walton of Detchant and supported by more than 40 MPs and Lords, the purpose of the Group was to raise the profile of Huntington's disease and establish a better methodology for estimating its prevalence, and thus lead to allocation of more appropriate resources for care and research. Within twenty-four months, the research commissioned showed that the disease was indeed more than twice as common as previously estimated.

Then, on May 18, 2017, Sabine became the first person with Huntington's disease to meet publicly with a world leader when Pope Francis said to a Global TV audience and an audience of 1,800, the largest number of people ever gathered in relation to Huntington's disease:

Today, however, we are here because we want to say to ourselves and all the world: “HIDDEN NO MORE!”, “OCULTA NUNCA MAS!”, “MAI PIU’ NASCOSTA!”. It is not simply a slogan, so much as a commitment that we all must foster.

— Pope Francis

The events of that day, and the extraordinary journey of Huntington's families to Rome from some of the poorest and most remote places on earth, was made into a film Dancing at the Vatican, released on Amazon and YouTube in six languages. Dancing at the Vatican premiered in Hollywood, California in July 2019. The documentary's European premiere took place at the British Academy of Film and Television Arts (BAFTA), in February, 2020.
