= Zoran Stevanović =

Zoran Stevanovic may refer to:

- Zoran Stevanović (journalist), television producer and executive
- Zoran Stevanović (basketball) (born 1970), Serbian basketball player
- Zoran Stevanović (politician) (born 1982), Slovenian politician, leader of Resni.ca
