= Edward Wild =

Edward Wild may refer to:

- Edward A. Wild (1825–1891), American homeopathic doctor and American Civil War general.
- Edward Wild (neuroscientist) (born 1978), British neurologist, neuroscientist, scientific outreach advocate; UCL Institute of Neurology
- Edward Wild, actor in Well Done, Henry
- Edward Wild, Conservative candidate in 2001 Ipswich by-election

== See also ==
- Edward Wilde, English politician
