= Milton Wexler =

American psychoanalyst

Milton Wexler (August 24, 1908 – March 16, 2007) was a Los Angeles psychoanalyst who was responsible for the creation of the Hereditary Disease Foundation.

== Early life ==
He was born in San Francisco and moved to New York, where he spent his remaining childhood years. He studied first at Syracuse University and then earned a law degree from New York University. Initially, he worked as a lawyer but became interested in psychology. In 1939 he began a PhD at Columbia University where his supervisor was Theodor Reik, a disciple of Sigmund Freud. After graduation he became one of the first non-physicians in the United States to practice as a psychoanalyst.

Wexler married Leonore Sabin (1913 – May 14, 1978) another Columbia University graduate (Master's in Zoology, 1936). They met in the mid 1930s while he was working as a lawyer and she as a teacher. Together they had two daughters – Nancy and Alice.

Wexler served in the US Navy during the Second World War. In 1946 he worked at the Menninger Foundation in Topeka, Kansas. He became known for his success in treating schizophrenics.

== Involvement with Huntington's disease ==
In 1950 his wife's three brothers (Paul, Seymour and Jesse) were diagnosed with Huntington's disease. His wife's father Abraham Sabin (1879–1926) had earlier died of this disease. She believed on the basis of what was known about this disease at the time when her father had died that this disease only affected men. It is curious that the textbook she consulted stated that only men suffered from this disease given that the original description by George Huntington in 1872 described it in a mother and daughter. Wexler moved to Los Angeles in 1951 to establish a more lucrative private practice so that he could support them.

His practice became popular with writers, artists and Hollywood stars. His patients included the director Blake Edwards, the actors Jennifer Jones and Dudley Moore, the comedian Carol Burnett and the architect Frank Gehry. He also collaborated on the scripts of films The Man who Loved Women and That's Life!. He was an advocate of group therapy sessions.

In the 1950s his wife, normally an outgoing person, developed depression and once attempted suicide. Neither Wexler nor his wife realized at this time that these symptoms may occur in Huntington's disease. They divorced in 1962.

In 1967, after getting out of her car at 9 a.m. while on jury duty, Leonore Wexler was stopped by a policeman who thought she had been drinking. She was referred to a neurologist who in 1968 diagnosed Huntington's disease. She got in touch with her ex-husband, with whom she was still in contact, and told him of the diagnosis. In response to this news, he later that year created an organization that became known as the Hereditary Disease Foundation. He enlisted the help of Marjorie Guthrie, the widow of the musician Woody Guthrie, who had also died of this disease. She had earlier set up an organization in California, the Committee to Combat Huntington's Disease which eventually became the Huntington's Disease Society of America, to raise funds for the investigation of this disease.

With the help of his daughters Wexler enlisted a number of scientists including the Nobel laureate James Watson. Salaries were low (US$1,000 per annum plus expenses), but he managed to attract workers by organizing parties with Hollywood stars, including many of his patients.

In 1972 Wexler became aware of a village on the edge of Lake Maracaibo in Venezuela with an extremely high incidence of Huntington's disease. He became aware of this village when a Venezuelan physician and biochemist at the University of Zulia, Americo Negrette, showed a film at a medical conference about this community, where the condition was known as 'El mal'. Negrette had become aware of this condition in the area in 1955. In 1979, Wexler's daughter Nancy set up a research project there to study its transmission and to collect DNA from those with the disease and from those who had escaped it. Her work there earned her the nickname 'La Catira' (the Blonde) among the villagers. This project is still ongoing.

The origin of the disease was eventually traced back to a single woman, María Concepción, who had lived in this area about 200 years before and whose roughly 18,000 descendants were primarily located in two villages in Venezuela, Barranquitas and Lagunetas. María Concepción's father seems likely to have been an unknown European sailor who also had Huntington's disease. The materials she collected were sent to a geneticist, James F. Gusella, at the Massachusetts General Hospital in Boston.

The gene responsible was finally located at the tip of the short arm of chromosome 4 in 1983. It was located with the aid of a marker designated G8, which incidentally was the first marker tested. This event earned Gusella the nickname 'Lucky Jim' among his colleagues.

The gene itself was finally located in 1993 The consortium involved in its discovery included fifty eight scientists in six groups spanning the Atlantic.

Since this discovery, gene work has continued in the attempt to discover a treatment for this disease.

Wexler was once asked why he became involved in the search of this gene. 'I became an activist because I was terribly selfish' he said. 'I was scared to death that one of my daughters would get it too.'

He featured in Sydney Pollack's documentary Sketches of Frank Gehry.

He died at home of respiratory failure aged 98.
