= Michael R. Hayden =

South African-Canadian medical geneticist

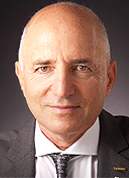
- Born: Cape Town, South Africa
- Education: Harvard University; University of Cape Town
- Awards: Dr. Don Rix Lifetime Achievement Award (2025); Doctor of Science(DSc(Med)) (honoris causa), University of Cape Town (2024); Lifetime Achievement Award (2023); Humanitarian Award (2020); Inductee, Canadian Medical Hall of Fame (2017); Gairdner Foundation Wightman Award (2011); Order of Canada (2010); Order of British Columbia (2009); Canada's Health Researcher of the Year - Biomedical and Clinical Research, Canadian Institutes for Health Research CIHR (2008)
- Scientific career
- Fields: Medical genetics, human genetics, personalized medicine
- Workplaces: Centre for Molecular Medicine and Therapeutics, Child & Family Research Institute, University of British Columbia; British Columbia's Children's Hospital; British Columbia's Children's Hospital; Provincial Health Services Authority

Michael R. Hayden, CM OBC FRSC is a Killam Professor of Medical Genetics at the University of British Columbia, the highest honour UBC can confer on any faculty member. Only four such awards have ever been conferred in the Faculty of Medicine. Hayden is best known for his research in Huntington disease (HD).

He is a founder, senior scientist and former director of the Centre for Molecular Medicine and Therapeutics (CMMT) in Vancouver, British Columbia, Canada; a genetic research centre within UBC's Faculty of Medicine and affiliated with the BC Children's Hospital Research Institute and the BC Children's Hospital Foundation. He was also Canada Research Chair in Human Genetics and Molecular Medicine from 2000-2021 and the Program Director of the Translational Laboratory in Genetic Medicine in Singapore from 2011 to 2020.

Dr. Hayden was appointed as the President of Global R&D and Chief Scientific Officer at Teva Pharmaceutical Industries from 2012 to 2017. During this time, he led approximately 35 new generic and specialty products to approval in major markets with many for diseases of the central nervous system. He led Austedo for chorea in HD, the second drug ever to be approved for HD and Ajovy, a CGRP antagonist for migraines to approval. In 2015, Teva R&D was recognized as one of the 10 most exciting innovators in Pharma by IDEA Pharma and in 2017, Teva R&D ranked top of the industry for CNS development and clinical trial success by Pharma Intelligence.

Hayden is the most cited author in the world for Huntington disease and ABCA1, and has authored over 960 publications and invited submissions (Google Scholar citations 115,438, h-index 173, i10-index 806; Web of Science citations 83,569, h-index 142).

Dr. Hayden is the recipient of numerous prestigious honours and awards. Most recently, he was awarded the 2025 Dr. Don Rix Lifetime Achievement Award, Life Sciences BC and the 2023 Lifetime Achievement Award by the Huntington Study Group, USA. He was awarded honorary degrees from: University of Cape Town (2024), University of Gottingen (2014), and University of Alberta (2009). Dr. Hayden was named one of PharmaVoice's "100 of the Most Inspiring People" in 2015 and for the second time in 2022. Dr. Hayden was awarded the David Dubinsky Humanitarian Award from the American Friends of Soroka Medical Center (AFSMC) (2020). He was inducted into the Canadian Medical Hall of Fame in 2017. Hayden received the Canada Gairdner Foundation Wightman Award in 2011, recognizing him as a physician-scientist who has demonstrated outstanding leadership in medicine and medical science. In 2010, he was awarded Member of the Order of Canada, following his receipt of the Order of British Columbia in 2009. In 2008, Dr. Hayden received recognition from the Canadian Institutes of Health Research (CIHR) as Canada's Health Researcher of the Year: CIHR Michael Smith Prizes in Health Research. and in 2007, he received the Prix Galien which recognizes the outstanding contribution of a researcher to Canadian pharmaceutical research.

In addition to his academic work, Hayden is the co-founder of five biotechnology companies including: Prilenia, NeuroVir Therapeutics Inc., Xenon Pharmaceuticals Inc., Aspreva Pharmaceuticals Corp and 89Bio and the CEO of Prilenia Therapeutics. He currently sits on different public and private boards of biotechnologies companies.

Dr. Hayden is committed to empowering others. In addition to mentoring over 100 graduate students and postdocs, he is also a TED mentor.

== Biography ==
Hayden was born in Cape Town, South Africa, one of Ann Platt's and Roger Hayden's two sons. His paternal grandfather, Max Raphael Hahn was an entrepreneur, art collector and chairman of the Jewish community in Göttingen, Germany. His grandfather and grandmother were murdered during the Holocaust. His father, originally named Rudolf (Rudi) Hahn, fled to London in 1939, enlisted in the British army and fought during World War II, and eventually settled in South Africa in 1947. After the divorce of his parents, when he was six, Hayden was raised by his single mother. In 1975, he graduated from the University of Cape Town as the top graduate in medicine, where he also received his PhD in Genetics (1979). He completed a post-doctoral fellowship and further training in Internal Medicine at Harvard Medical School. Michael is board-certified in both Internal Medicine and Clinical Genetics. He moved to Canada and joined the University of British Columbia (UBC) in 1983 from the Children's Hospital in Boston, a teaching arm of Harvard Medical School.

He is married and has four children and eight grandchildren.

== Science ==
Hayden's research focus is primarily on genetic diseases, including genetics of lipoprotein disorders, Huntington disease, predictive medicine, personalized medicine and drug development. Along with his research team, Hayden has identified 10 disease-causing genes, which includes the identification of the major gene underlying high-density lipoprotein (HDL) in humans. This gene, known as ABCA1, has major implications for atherosclerosis and diabetes. Hayden also identified the first mutations underlying Lipoprotein lipase deficiency (LPL) and developed gene therapy approaches to treat this condition, the first approved gene therapy in the western world. He was also co-leader of the Canadian Pharmacogenomics Network for Drug Safety project (2006-2012), a BC-led Genome Canada-funded, national strategy to prevent adverse drug reactions.

== Honours ==
OBC ribbon

Since 2010:

- 2025- "2025 Dr. Don Rix Lifetime Achievement Award", Life Sciences British Columbia
- 2024- "Medicine Leader Award & Best Medicine Scientists, Ranked #13 Nationally Global Highly Ranked Scholar in Molecular Genetics #44", ScholarGPS
- 2024- "Doctor of Science in Medicine (DSc(Med)) (honoris causa)", University of Cape Town, South Africa
- 2023- "Biology and Biochemistry Leader Award, Nationally Ranked #3 Best Biology and Biochemistry Scientists in Canada", Research.com
- 2023- "Best Scientist in Canada Award, Ranked #22", Research.com
- 2023- "Lifetime Achievement Award", Huntington Study Group, USA
- 2023- One of the 100 most inspiring people in Life Sciences, PharmaVoice
- 2020- David Dubinsky Humanitarian Award, American Friends of Soroka Medical Center (AFSMC)
- 2017- Inductee, Canadian Medical Hall of Fame
- 2015- One of 100 most inspirational and influential persons in Pharma by PharmaVoice
- 2014- Honorary Doctor of Medicine, University of Göttingen
- 2014- Luminary of the Year, Personalized Medicine World Conference
- 2013- Named one of 50 Canadians born in the 20th century who have changed the world in a book by Ken McGoogan (including Pierre Elliott Trudeau, Leonard Cohen, Oscar Peterson and John Kenneth Galbraith)
- 2012- The Diamond Jubilee Medal, on behalf of HRH Queen Elizabeth II given in recognition of significant contributions and achievements.
- 2011- Champion of Genetics, The Canadian Gene Cure Foundation (CGCF)
- 2011- Killam Prize, Canada Council of the Arts, given in recognition of outstanding career achievements.
- 2011- Aubrey J. Tingle Prize, Michael Smith Foundation for Health Research
- 2011- Margolese National Prize, University of British Columbia
- 2011- Canada Gairdner Wightman, Gairdner Foundation
- 2011- Genome BC Award for Scientific Excellence, LifeSciences British Columbia
- 2010- Order of Canada
- 2010- Jacob Biely Faculty Research Prize, University of British Columbia

== Art and Science ==
In 2002, Hayden was part of the cast of the documentary Chasing the Cure which discussed treatments for widespread killer-heart disease, cancer, and bacterial poisoning and how research findings will change the face of medicine in the next 20 years.

Hayden appears in the 2012 documentary movie Do You Really Want to Know? directed by John Zaritsky. In the film, Hayden describes his professional relationship and friendship with Huntington's disease family member and researcher Jeff Carroll and the process of guiding Carroll and his five siblings through genetic testing for the mutation that causes Huntington's.

Hayden is also a subject in the 2013 documentary, "Alive & Well", directed by Josh Taft. In the film, he discusses his mission to find a cure for Huntington's disease.

== See also ==
- Huntington Disease
- Centre for Molecular Medicine and Therapeutics
- BC Children's Hospital Foundation
- Tangier Disease
- University of British Columbia
- Personalized Medicine
- Masiphumelele
