= Zoran Stevanović (journalist) =

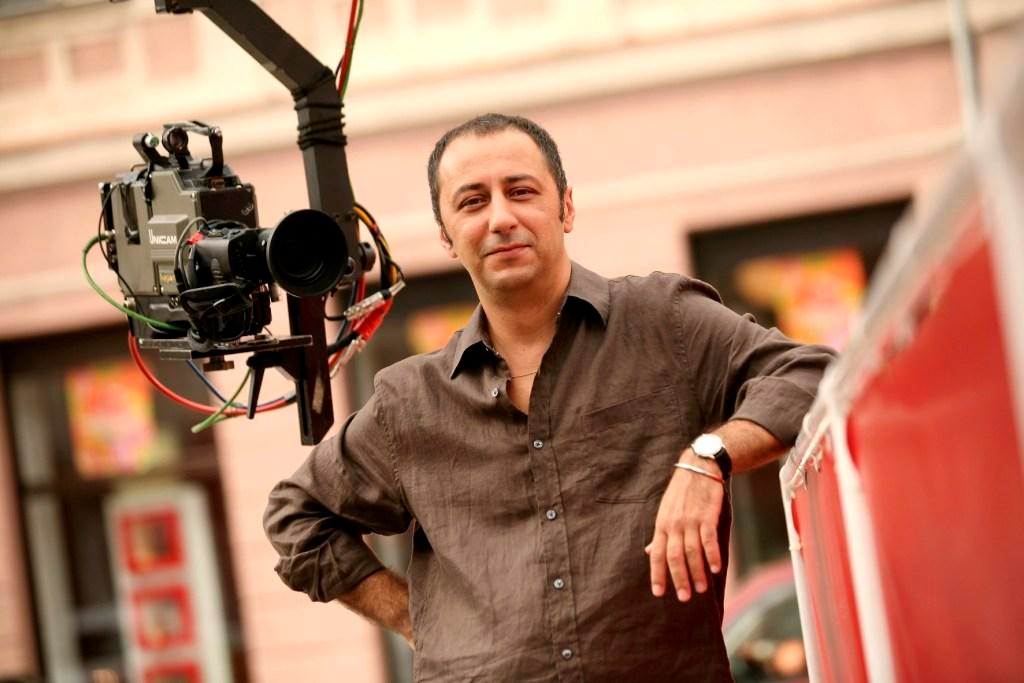

Zoran Stevanovic is a journalist, television producer and executive with broad experience in broadcast management and production, with more than twenty five years of television experience internationally.

He worked at CNNs Atlanta Headquarters for more than twelve years as Senior Assignment Editor on the CNN International Desk in Atlanta

Prior to joining to UNHCR Zoran Stevanovic was the Director of Newsgathering and Programming for the N1 TV news channels, CNN's Exclusive News Affiliate for the Adria region and played an instrumental role in launching N1 in Bosnia and Herzegovina, Croatia and Serbia.

Stevanovic is the recipient of numerous awards, including: "Accolade Turner Broadcasting -CNN" award in 2005, The Television Academy “Emmy Award” for “The Best News Coverage - Afghanistan” in 2002, and the Alfred I. DuPont award in 1995 for Best Feature Documentary Film produced by National Film Board of Canada and PBS-FRONTLINE's "Romeo and Juliet in Sarajevo".

Until May 2024 he served as Spokesperson/Sr. Regional Communications Officer for the United Nations High Commissioner for Refugees Representation Central Europe region, based in Budapest. The head of communications and public information unit, in charge of the implementation of different strategies in nine countries. Previously held Sr. Regional Strategic Communications and Advocacy Officer position for Northern Europe, based in Stockholm, Sweden where he oversaw UNHCR communications and advocacy activities in eight countries. Spent eight years (2006–2014) as Bratislava based UNDP Regional Communications Advisor for Europe and the CIS.

Being a graduate of University of Sarajevo School of Journalism (BA in Journalism), and Singidunum University (MA in Global Media Communications), Zoran Stevanović started his career in 1986 as journalist at "Radio Sarajevo 202", and few years later at "Omladinski Radio" in Sarajevo.

Currently self-employed with no particular assignments or projects. On his twitter account he describes himself as retired.
