= Right to Die? =

2010 documentary

Right to Die?, also known as The Suicide Tourist, is a documentary film directed by Canadian John Zaritsky about the assisted suicide of Craig Colby Ewert (1947–2006), a 59-year-old retired university professor who suffered from amyotrophic lateral sclerosis (sometimes known as Lou Gehrig's disease).

Ewert, who lived in Harrogate, North Yorkshire, England where assisted suicide is punishable by 14 years in jail, travelled to Switzerland where he was assisted by the Swiss NGO Dignitas at a rented Zurich apartment. The documentary, which covers the last four days of his life, shows him dying on 26 September 2006 with Mary, his wife of 37 years, at his side. An employee of Dignitas can be seen preparing a lethal dose of pentobarbital on camera, following which Ewert drinks it and dies. He died listening to Beethoven's Symphony No. 9. Ewert's children, Ivan and Katrina, who live in the US, decided not to attend their father's death after he expressed concerns that they would become upset.

Right to Die? was shown at the Toronto International Film Festival in Canada on 14 November 2007 and at the Reykjavik International Film Festival in Iceland on 26 September. It was shown on Canadian and Swiss television and at film festivals, without controversy. It was shown on television in Hungary on 2 October 2008. It aired on Sky Real Lives in the UK in December 2008. It aired in Germany on 24 January 2009.

The Suicide Tourist aired on Frontline on PBS in the USA on 2 March 2010.

== Reception ==
Every day you learn something new ... even in the last day.

— Craig Ewert, 2006

Prime Minister Gordon Brown, questioned in the House of Commons, hours before the documentary was screened, told MPs that he "thinks it is very important that these issues are dealt with sensitively and without sensationalism and I hope broadcasters remember that they have a wider responsibility to the general public."

He further explained his position: "I believe that it's necessary to ensure that there is never a case in the country where a sick or elderly person feels under pressure to agree to an assisted death or somehow feels it's the expected thing to do. That's why I've always opposed legislation for assisted deaths". A spokesman for Dignity in Dying criticized Brown's statement: "Gordon Brown's comments underline why there needs to be a full debate in Parliament on this issue". Lord Warner, a former Health Minister, added: "Gordon Brown's comments are not terribly helpful.... Survey after survey has shown that 75-80 per cent of the population are in favour of assisted dying for the terminally ill when their pain has become unbearable, providing there are appropriate safeguards in place". Privately, other politicians also criticised Gordon Brown, claiming that he had breached a convention of government neutrality by expressing a view on an issue recognised as one of conscience rather than party policy.

The Sun found the documentary deeply moving. Director John Zaritsky, said making a film about euthanasia without showing the moment of death would be "less than honest".

The broadcast on Sky was watched by 231,000 viewers. This was a huge boost to Sky Real Lives' ratings – the show had less than 10,000 viewers in the same time slot a week before. Mary Ewert defended the documentary against criticism that it was a "cynical attempt to boost television ratings". Their son Ivan told The Sun from his home in Chicago, Illinois "I am very proud of what Dad did."

== See also ==
- Assisted suicide
- Betty and George Coumbias
- Euthanasia in the United Kingdom
- How to Die in Oregon
