= Do You Really Want to Know? =

- Poster
- Directed by: John Zaritsky
- Produced by: Kevin Eastwood
- Cinematography: Ian Kerr; Mike Grippo; Steven Deneault; Kevin Eastwood
- Edited by: Tanya Maryniak
- Music by: David F. Ramos
- Distributed by: Beyond (world); Moving Images (Canada) Hello Cool World (DVD)
- Release date: May 6, 2012 (Canada)
- Running time: 72 minutes
- Country: Canada
- Language: English

Do You Really Want to Know? is a 2012 documentary film directed by John Zaritsky and produced by Kevin Eastwood. Using interviews and dramatic recreations, the film recounts the stories of three families who carry the gene for Huntington's disease, a neurodegenerative illness which is the result of a genetic abnormality, whose symptoms typically appear in mid-life. Members of each featured family have undergone predictive testing to learn whether or not they have inherited the gene that causes the disease, and they each describe the impact that testing has had upon their lives. Do You Really Want to Know? had its world premiere in Canada at the 2012 DOXA Documentary Film Festival and its broadcast premiere on November 13, 2012, on Knowledge Network.

== Plot ==
The main subjects of the film are Jeff Carroll, a US Army Veteran and Huntington's disease researcher from Washington; Dr. John Roder, a renowned cancer specialist at the Samuel Lunenfeld Research Institute at Mount Sinai Hospital, Toronto; Theresa Monahan of Ohio, who was among the first Americans to undergo predictive testing for Huntington's disease in 1988, and Dr. Michael R. Hayden, who is the director of the Centre for Molecular Medicine and Therapeutics at the University of British Columbia, and the world's most-cited researcher with regard to Huntington's disease.

Jeff Carroll's story involves learning about his family's genetic history after he was already married and considering having children. He underwent testing at Dr. Michael Hayden's Centre for Molecular Medicine and Therapeutics and learned that he had inherited the genetic abnormality that will cause him to develop Huntington's disease later in life. Subsequent to his diagnosis, he joined Dr. Hayden's research team and obtained a Ph.D. for his research on Huntington's disease. Meanwhile, he and his wife had decided that it would be unethical to conceive children who might inherit the disease from him, so they used preimplantation genetic diagnosis to ensure their children were born free of the genetic abnormality. He is now an advocate and frequent public speaker on Huntington's disease and encourages all at-risk individuals to be tested and to participate in clinical trials so that research into treatment can progress as quickly as possible.

Dr. John Roder and his wife Mary-Lou were already parents when Dr. Roder underwent testing for Huntington's disease in the 1990s and learned that he carried the gene for Huntington's. Roughly ten years later, in his 50s, Dr. Roder began showing symptoms of the disease, including severe depression and Huntington's chorea, a muscle control and movement disorder typical of the disease. Despite his decline in health, he continued working with the goal of retiring at age 65 as someone with normal health would. When the Roders' two adult children underwent testing, they were both negative for the Huntington's gene, though it was earlier discovered that son Nathan had schizophrenia. Subsequent to his and Nathan's diagnoses, Dr. Roder changed the focus of his research from cancer and metabolism to schizophrenia and brain diseases.

Theresa Monahan is from a large family with a history of Huntington's disease. Her mother and eldest brother died of the disease, but her surviving siblings, like most people at risk for Huntington's, have declined to be tested over concern that a positive diagnosis could ruin their quality of life long before symptoms affected their health. Without telling her family, Theresa proceeded with testing as part of a landmark study at the Indiana University in 1988, but declined to read her results until her daughter got married and she became concerned about the possibility of passing the disease down to her potential grandchildren. Her results showed she was negative for the HD gene, meaning she would not get the disease. As is typical of at-risk people who test negative for HD, she reports feeling some survivor guilt over her results.

== Release ==
The film's first Canadian public exhibition took place on May 6, 2012, in Vancouver, British Columbia at the DOXA Documentary Film Festival before a sold-out crowd at the Vancouver International Film Centre. A second screening was added to meet audience demand.

Its US festival premiere took place on August 17 at the 2012 Gig Harbor Film Festival.

The Western Canadian broadcast premiere took place on November 13, 2012, on Knowledge Network. The film had its Eastern Canadian broadcast premiere on February 6, 2013, on TVOntario.

=== Awards ===
At the 2012 Yorkton Film Festival, Do You Really Want to Know? received two Golden Sheaf Awards: Best Documentary (Science/Medicine/Technology), and Best Director (Non-Fiction).

The film received a Chris Award at the 2012 Columbus International Film & Video Festival for Best Documentary in the Science + Technology division.

It won the award for Best Documentary the 2012 Okanagan International Film Festival.
