= Betty and George Coumbias =

Canadian couple who sought medical aid in dying

Betty and George Coumbias were a Canadian married couple who sought to become the first husband and wife to complete simultaneous suicides with legal authorization. They were featured in John Zaritsky's 2007 documentary, The Suicide Tourist. Although assisted suicide was illegal in Canada, they hoped to end their lives with the approval of the government of Switzerland.

The couple's request was unusual in that, while George Coumbias suffered from heart disease, Betty Coumbias was reported to be in excellent health.

Ludwig Minelli, director of Swiss assisted-suicide group Dignitas, petitioned the Canton of Zurich to grant doctors the authority to issue lethal drugs to healthy people after being counseled by his organization, hoping to facilitate the Coumbias' suicide pact.

In 2009, Betty Coumbias developed cancer and died, while George continued to live with his heart condition. He died in 2016.

== See also ==
- Euthanasia
- Suicide tourism
