= Edward Wild (neuroscientist) =

British neurologist

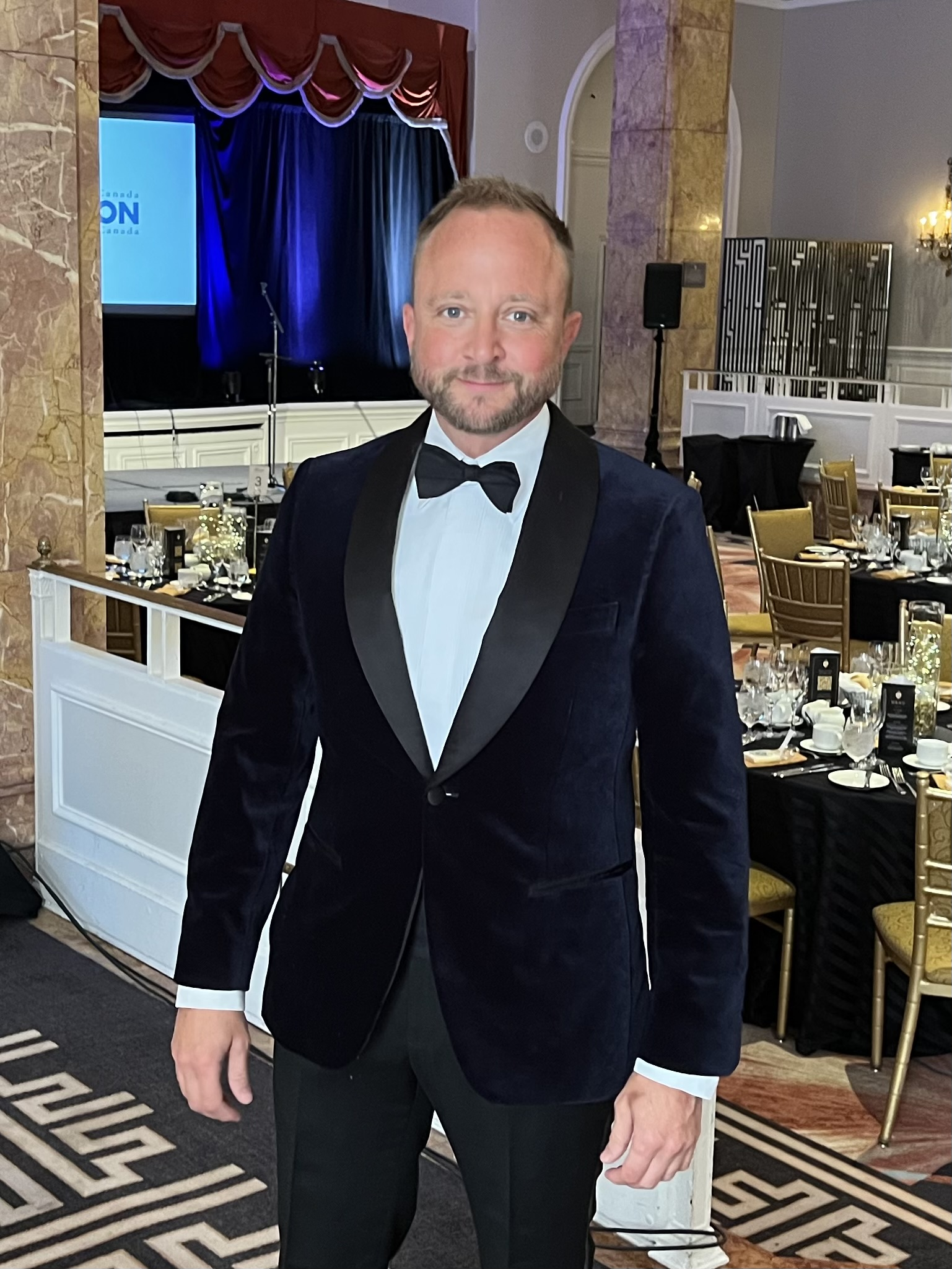
- Professor Wild in May 2023
- Born: Edward John Wild; 1978 (age 47–48); UK
- Education: Christ's College, Cambridge (1996–2001); University College London (2005–2008)
- Known for: Huntington's disease research and outreach
- Awards: Huntington's Disease Society of America Researcher of the Year, 2014; Huntington Society of Canada Community Leadership Award, 2013; Huntington Study Group Insight of the Year, 2015.
- Scientific career
- Fields: Neuroscience
- Workplaces: UCL Institute of Neurology; National Hospital for Neurology and Neurosurgery
- Thesis: Identification and evaluation of biomarkers for Huntington's disease (2009)
- Doctoral advisor: Sarah Tabrizi
- Website: edwild.com

Edward John Wild (born 1978), also known as Ed Wild, is a British neurologist and neuroscientist in the field of Huntington's disease and an advocate for scientific outreach to the public. He co-founded the Huntington's research news platform HDBuzz in 2010. He is Professor of Neurology at UCL Institute of Neurology and is an associate director of the UCL Huntington's Disease Centre. He is also a consultant neurologist at the National Hospital for Neurology and Neurosurgery in London.

== Career ==
Wild studied medicine at Christ's College, Cambridge. In his early career, he studied and published on the neurological phenomenon of déjà vu. He undertook a PhD, supervised by Professor Sarah Tabrizi, at the UCL Institute of Neurology, Queen Square, London, during which he published research on biomarkers for Huntington's disease using magnetic resonance imaging measures of brain atrophy and biochemical analysis of blood. Wild and Tabrizi continue to work together at the UCL Huntington's Disease Centre.

Wild and colleagues described a novel pathogenic pathway of immune activation in Huntington's which later became the basis of clinical trials of immune-targeted therapies. In 2015, he published the first successful detection and quantification of mutant huntingtin protein (the known cause of Huntington's) in human cerebrospinal fluid, using a novel 'single-molecule counting' immunoassay. This finding was noted as a 'research highlight' by Nature Reviews Neurology and won Wild the Huntington Study group 'Insight of the Year' award in 2015. He has also published novel genetic causes of 'phenocopy' syndromes that mimic Huntington's disease.

Wild's research since 2017 has focused on the potential of neurofilament light and mutant huntingtin protein as biomarkers for Huntington's disease onset and progression. His work has shown that NFL has better prognostic value in Huntington's disease, but that mutant huntingtin might be a valuable marker for early and sensitive detection of change in clinical huntingtin-lowering trials. He was a senior investigator in the clinical programme studying the antisense oligonucleotide tominersen to lower mutant huntingtin production in HD, and gave the first dose of the drug to a patient in 2015.

He serves on the Medical Advisory Panel of the UK Huntington's Disease Association, the Editorial Board of the Journal of Huntington's Disease, the Association of British Neurologists Neurogenetics Advisory Panel, and the Translational Neurology Panel of the European Academy of Neurology. He is a member of the Executive Committee of the European Huntington's Disease Network and Co-lead facilitator of the Network's Biomarkers Working Group. He is a founder member of the advisory panel to the UK All-party parliamentary group on Huntington's disease.

Wild was a senior investigator on the trial program testing AMT130, an AAV5 gene therapy given by intracranial injection. In September 2025 he announced topline results showing it had become the first successful disease-slowing treatment for HD, delaying clinical progression of HD by 75%.

He was promoted to Professor of Neurology in October 2020, in the UCL Faculty of Brain Sciences. As of September 2022, Wild has authored 7 book chapters and 150 peer-reviewed publications with over 12,000 citations.

== Public engagement work ==
In 2010, with Jeff Carroll, Wild founded HDBuzz, an online source of accessible news about Huntington's disease research, that has received awards from patient advocacy groups. He said he helped establish HDBuzz to provide tempered research news to counter the hype of medical press releases about HD. He has commented that common online opinions that people with Huntington's disease should not be allowed to have children "borders on historical eugenics-type thinking". He has described Huntington's as "the most curable incurable brain disorder" because of the possibility of targeting treatments to its known genetic cause.

Wild appeared in the documentary feature film The Inheritance and was a judge for the 2015 British Library / Europe PubMed Central 'Access to Understanding' contest for science writers. He has appeared on the BBC Radio Naked Scientists programme. In July 2016, he appeared on BBC Radio 4's Woman's Hour programme talking about Huntington's disease with Jenni Murray. In December 2017, he appeared on RTE Radio 1 talking about Huntington's disease treatments. In 2020, he appeared in the Ken Burns PBS documentary The Gene: An Intimate History.

In 2021, he wrote the afterword of Patient 1, a book by Charlotte Raven about her experiences with Huntington's disease, including her participation on the trial of the experimental drug tominersen. Wild is Raven's doctor and injected her with the first dose of tominersen on the Gen-Peak trial.

== Personal life ==
As of 2021 Wild lived in East London with his partner Joel, a cat and a chihuahua, Riley.

== Awards and honours ==
- 2012 Huntington Society of Canada Community Leadership Award
- 2014 Huntington's Disease Society of America Researcher of the Year Award.
- 2015 Huntington Study Group Insight of the Year (for his CSF mutant huntingtin research).
- 2017 Huntington Study Group Insight of the Year (for the finding that neurofilament light in blood can predict onset and progression of HD).
- 2018 Elected Fellow of the Royal College of Physicians.
