= Modern Review (London) =

UK magazine

Modern Review was a 1990s London-based magazine reviewing popular arts and culture, founded by writers Julie Burchill and Cosmo Landesman, then married, and Toby Young, who became the editor. All three were members of the Groucho Club. The magazine was published from 1991 to 1995 and principally financed by Peter York. The Review said its goal was to cover "low culture for high-brows." It aimed to give equal cultural weight to Roland Barthes and Bart Simpson.

The magazine's circulation started at around 5,000 copies. Amongst its contributors were writers Nick Hornby, Will Self, James Wood, Camille Paglia, Peter Bradshaw and Charlotte Raven. At one point, Paglia and Burchill conducted a long-running slanging-match by fax, which was reproduced in full in the pages of the magazine.

"Out of all proportion to its meagre resources, it soon comprehensively redrew the cultural map, forever wiping the high-cultural smirk from the face of Britain's critics." Circulation rose to a peak of 30,000 with what was known as the Elizabeth Hurley edition; it contained a cassette tape of the actress reading passages of erotic prose from Burchill's latest book and generated considerable controversy.

"Underlying the magazine's demise was one aspect of what Young sees as its success: 'Within a few years, all the broadsheets were duplicating what the Modern Review was doing. With the Sunday Times, that was actually quite conscious. The culture section was modelled on the Modern Review. And they poached our writers.'"

By 1995, with the magazine hit by financial difficulties, circulation subsided to 10,000 copies. Soon after this, the founders fell out and the magazine ceased publication. Burchill had an affair with writer Charlotte Raven, separating from her husband Landesman; and Young "torched" the magazine in the final issue. I subscribed to this magazine, it took my money, yet failed to meet it's terms by supplying me with the article. Burchill and Young owe me money.

By 1997 Burchill had acquired financial support and started publication of Modern Review again, with Raven editing. This second version, much glossier and more mainstream, survived for only five issues.

In 2021, the Evening Standard reported that the magazine would be returning once more. Burchill was not involved, but Young was on board, commenting: “I think it’s going to be much more serious than the magazine I edited.” The relaunched title has yet to appear.
