= Leave Them Laughing =

- Directed by: John Zaritsky
- Produced by: Montana Berg
- Starring: Carla Zilber-Smith; Mac Zilber
- Cinematography: Ed Matney
- Edited by: Scott Doniger; Justin Cousineau
- Music by: Carla Zilber-Smith; David Ramos
- Production company: Magical Flute Films
- Release date: May 6, 2010
- Running time: 90 minutes
- Countries: Canada; United States

Leave Them Laughing: A Musical Comedy About Dying is a 2010 documentary film directed by Academy-Award-winning director John Zaritsky. It follows the life of singer and comedian Carla Zilber-Smith, after she is diagnosed with Lou Gehrig's Disease, as she blogs and jokes her way through a disease that carries a certain death sentence. The film premiered at Hot Docs Canadian International Documentary Festival on May 6, 2010, winning the Special Jury Prize for best Canadian Documentary. It was nominated for Best Documentary at the 31st Genie Awards.Cole, Yolande (March 2, 2011). "Western Canadian nominees for Genie Awards honoured at Vancouver reception". The Georgia Straight.

== Reception ==
The film has received a mainly positive reception. At the 2010 Hot Docs Canadian International Documentary Festival, the film won the Hot Docs Award for Best Canadian Feature Documentary Special Jury Prize. It also won the People's Choice Award for Best Canadian Documentary at the Vancouver International Film Festival, and the Directors' Choice Award at the 2011 Sedona International Film Festival. It also won the People's Choice Award at the Canadian-American Film Grand Prix, the Audience Choice award for best Documentary at the Mill Valley Film Festival, Best of Festival at Calgary's Picture This...International Film Festival, Best Documentary at the 2011 Vancouver Women in Film Festival, and Best on the Edge in New Zealand's 2011 "Documentary Edge Film Festival".

== See also ==
- John Zaritsky
