= Hereditary Disease Foundation =

US-based non-profit organization

- Founder: Dr. Milton Wexler
- Purpose: Huntington's disease and brain disorders research funding
- Region served: Worldwide
- Methods: Grant-making
- Website: hdfoundation.org

The Hereditary Disease Foundation (HDF) aims to cure genetic disorders, notably Huntington's disease, by supporting basic biomedical research. In 2025 the foundation changed its name officially to the Huntington's Disease Foundation, keeping the same HDF abbreviation.

== History ==
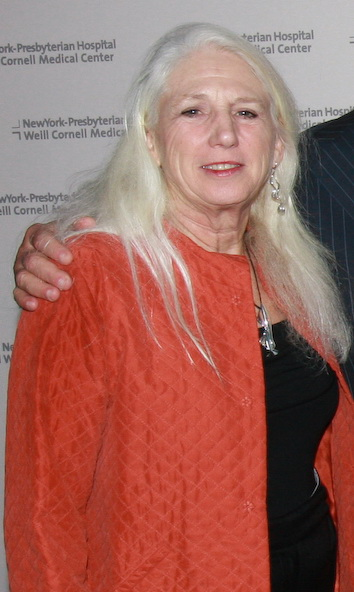
Nancy Wexler, current president of the HDF

In 1968, after experiencing Huntington's disease (HD) in his wife's family, Milton Wexler was inspired to start the Hereditary Disease Foundation, with the aim of curing genetic illnesses by co-ordinating and supporting research. At a workshop held by the HDF in 1979, participants proposed to map the human genome and find a marker for the gene which causes HD. The HDF, together with the National Institute of Neurological Disorders and Stroke and Wexler's daughter, Nancy Wexler, organized the US–Venezuela Huntington's Disease Collaborative Research Project. This project studied a kindred with an unusually high prevalence of HD. In 1983, a marker for a gene was found, and in the next decade, with further HDF involvement, the exact gene (Huntingtin) was found. Many techniques developed in finding the Huntingtin gene were used to advance the Human Genome Project. The Huntingtin gene was also one of the first disease genes to be found. Its discovery and the debates raised have provided the framework for genetic testing, counselling and possible therapies for other genetic diseases that can be genetically tested.

In late 2025, the foundation announced an official change of its name, from Hereditary Disease Foundation to Huntington's Disease foundation, via its website.

== Presidency ==
Nancy Wexler is the foundation's president.
