= Max Raphael Hahn =

Jewish entrepreneur and art collector (1880–1942)

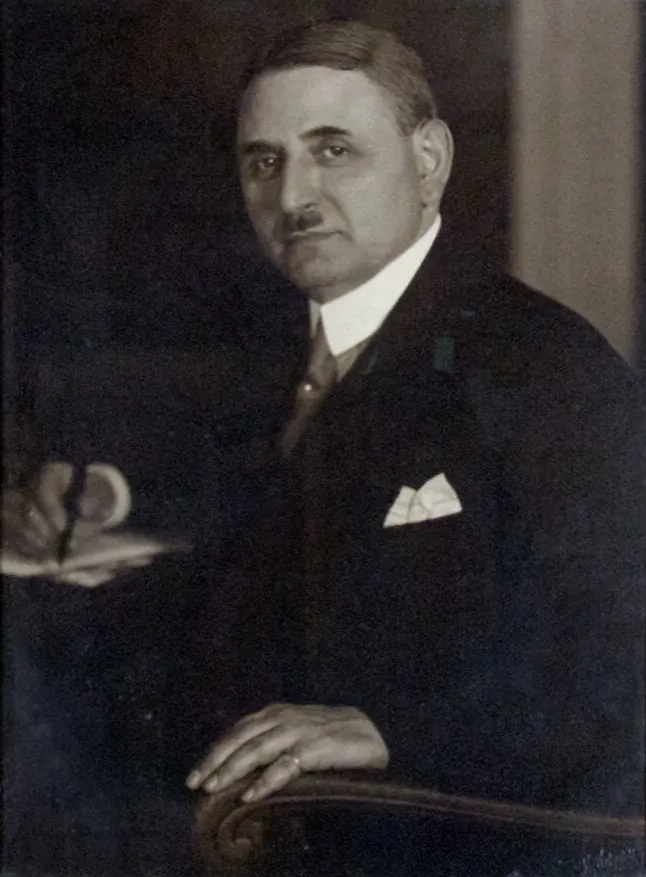
- Max Raphael Hahn
- Born: April 22, 1880; Göttingen
- Died: March 1942 (aged 61)

Max Raphael Hahn (born April 22, 1880, in Göttingen; died March 1942 in Riga) was a Jewish entrepreneur, chairman of the Jewish community of Göttingen, and art collector.

== Early life ==
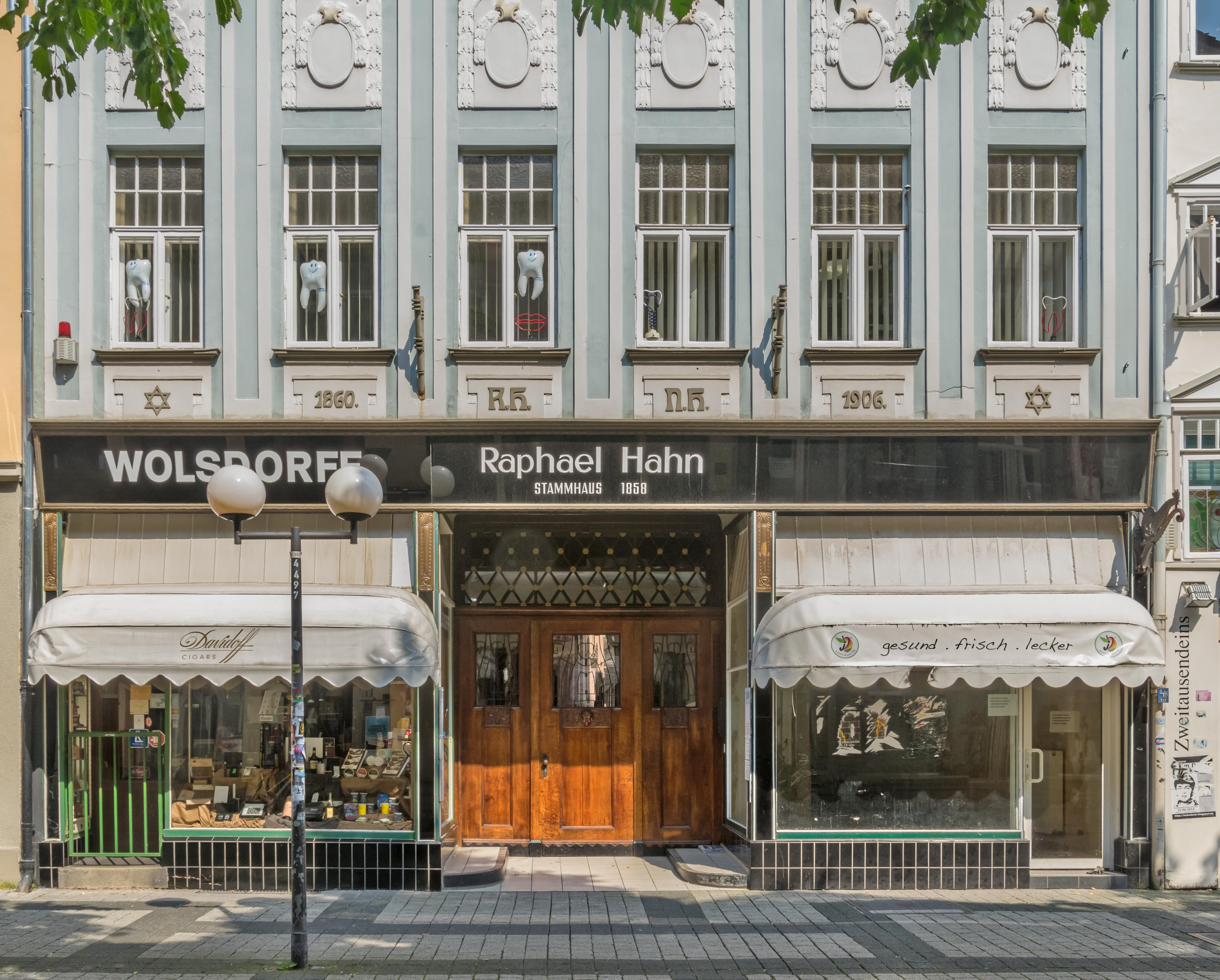
Home- and family business Weender Str. 70

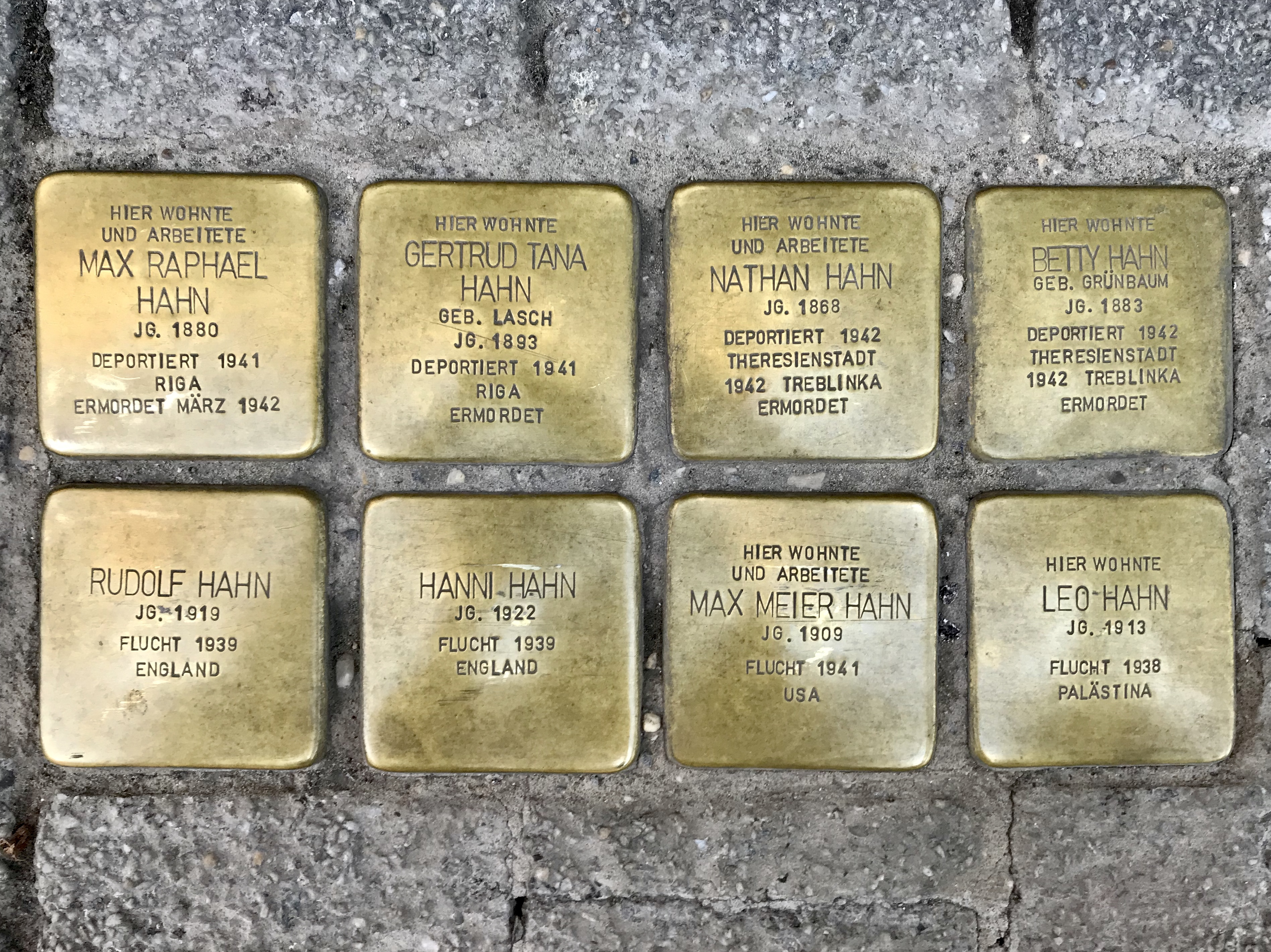
Commemorative Stolpersteine for the Hahn family

Max Raphael Hahn was the youngest son of Jewish merchant Raphael Hahn (May 27, 1831, in Rhina – December 22, 1915, in Göttingen), a native of Rhina in Hesse, and his wife Hannchen Blaut (November 25, 1837, in Geisa – November 24, 1908, in Göttingen), a native of Geisa in Thuringia. Raphael Hahn had come to Göttingen in 1858 and had founded a branch of the family business here, which specialized in trading in hides and casings.

In 1864, Raphael Hahn purchased the large house at Weender Strasse 63 (now 70) in Göttingen, which was to become the family's ancestral home, which today bears a commemorative inscription.

== Business and family life ==
In 1896 Max Hahn joined his father's business, where his eldest brother Nathan (born November 27, 1868, in Göttingen, murdered in September 1942 in Treblinka) worked since 1887. The two brothers jointly managed the business, in which their father - although officially no longer managing director since 1899 - still took a lively interest until his death in 1915, until the expulsion of the family by the Nazis in 1940. Nathan and Max Raphael Hahn made the company Raphael Hahn, Göttingen, which later included a shoe factory as well as extensive real estate holdings, highly successful.

During the First World War, Nathan Hahn had the company warehouses serve as a collection point for hides and cases needed for troop equipment, and Max Raphael Hahn worked as a leather expert for the Prussian War Raw Materials Department, first in Leipzig, then in Vienna and in Budapest.

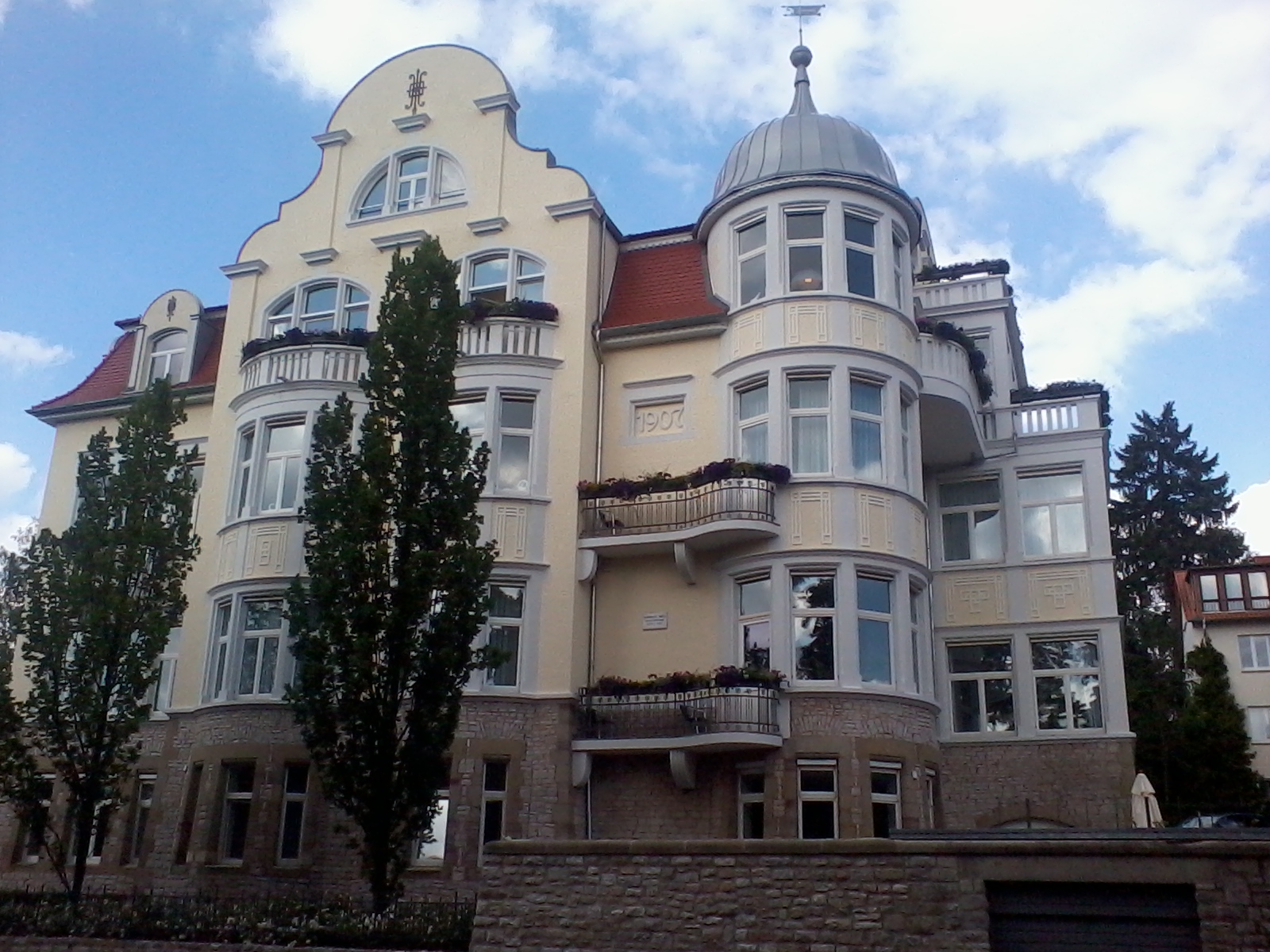
Villa Merkelstraße 3

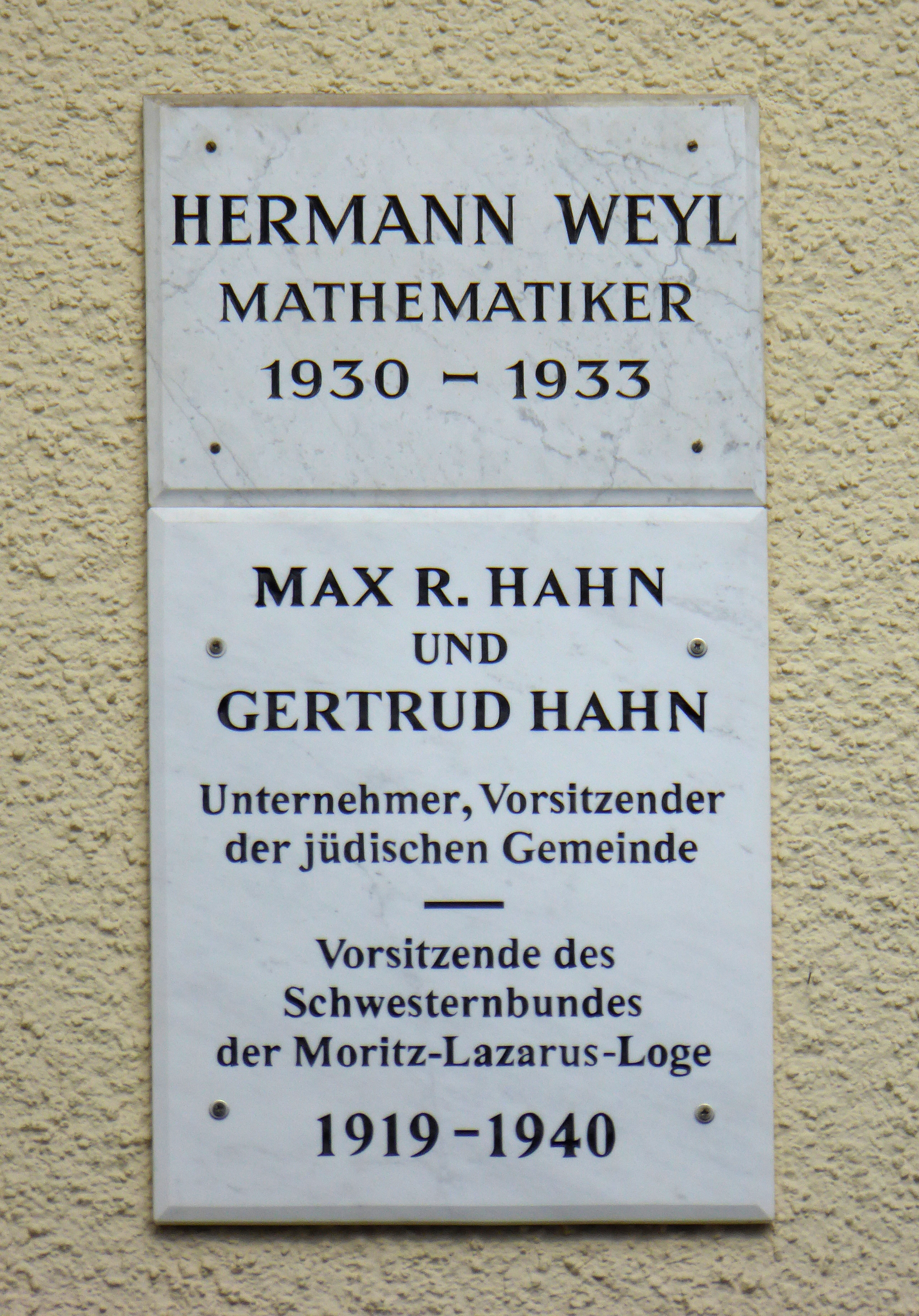
Memorial plaques at the villa Merkelstraße 3

In June 1917 Hahn married Gertud Hana Lasch (born July 14, 1893, in Halberstadt, murdered 1941 in Riga) and in February 1919 Max Raphael Hahn returned to Göttingen and purchased a villa at Merkelstraße 3 in early September 1919, where their son Rudolf was born to the couple on December 3, 1919, and their daughter Hanni on March 22, 1922. The couple had a total of 12 children, but only seven of them survived to adulthood.

== From Orthodox Judaism to Reform Judaism ==
Max Raphael and Gertrud Hahn were both raised in Orthodox Judaism. However, unlike their parents, they reconciled Orthodox Judaism with the Reform Judaism prevailing in Göttingen, which had materialized in the large and in 1895 expanded Old Synagogue at Untere Masch 1, (commemorated after the destruction of November 9 and 10, 1938, by the memorial erected in 1973 on the square of the synagogue). After the First World War and his return to Göttingen, Max Raphael Hahn joined the Reform Jewish majority congregation and in October 1921 became one of the three chairmen of the congregation. He held this office for almost twenty years until his expulsion by Nazis from Göttingen in April 1940.

The Hahn couple was also involved in the Göttingen chapter of the liberal Jewish Moritz Lazarus Lodge. According to its bylaws, the Lodge required each of its members to prove at all times "that Judaism is synonymous with righteous behavior, with the practice of the highest principles of ethics and humanity, that the profession of the Jewish religion brings honor to the Jew" (from the Laws of the Göttingen Local Group of the Lodge of 1921, p. 4). The president of the Lodge was elected by the members for two years at a time. At least once Max Raphael Hahn also held this office in the time before 1933.

Women were excluded from membership in the lodges. However, there were sisterhoods affiliated to the lodges since 1886. In 1933 the sisterhood of the Moritz-Lazarus-Lodge in Göttingen was led by Gertrud Hahn.

== Nazi persecution, plunder and murder ==
During the time of Nazi persecution Max Raphael Hahn cared for congregation members in need, helping some to emigrate and comforting others. The young Rabbi Hermann Ostfeld, who was only 23 years old when he was appointed to Göttingen in 1935 and who changed his name to Zvi Hermon after his emigration to Palestine in October 1938, later wrote memoirs of his time in Göttingen and in them also drew an impressive picture of Max Raphael Hahn's caring work in the community.

Of the original almost 500 Jewish Göttingen residents, only about 220 were still living in Göttingen in October 1938. Almost without exception, these became victims of the brutal assaults by the SS and SA, who on the night of the Reich Pogrom from November 9 to 10, 1938, but also on the two following days, broke into homes or business premises, devastated the facilities, looted the stores, mistreated the residents and arrested men, women and even children without distinction.

Max Raphael Hahn and his family, as wealthy Jews, were subjected to special harassment. In the middle of the night of November 10, at about two in the morning, SS men with axes broke into the villa at Merkelstrasse 3, roused the Hahns from their sleep and devastated their home. They smashed the doors and windows and destroyed furniture, artwork and antiques, driving the family out into the street in their nightgowns. Max Raphael and Gertrud Hahn, his brother Nathan and his wife Betty, whose apartment at 19 Baurat Gerber Strasse had also been vandalized, were arrested. The two women were released the next day, and Nathan Hahn returned home on November 19, 1938. Max Raphael Hahn was the only one to remain in custody until July 15, 1939. That was the reason why he and his wife did not manage to emigrate in time, for which relatives in the USA and England had already prepared everything. Their two children were able to escape to England in 1939.

After the Hahn enterprises were liquidated on March 1, 1939, due to Nazi persecution Max Raphael and Gertrud Hahn moved to Hamburg in April 1940, hoping to emigrate from there. But on December 6, 1941, they were deported from Hamburg to Riga. Gertrud Hahn, who was diabetic, possibly died on the transport, Max Raphael Hahn was murdered at the latest in March 1942 during the so-called Aktion Dünamünde, a large-scale shooting operation in a forest near Riga.

The son Rudolf emigrated from Great Britain to Cape Town and changed his name to Roger Hayden. He is the father of the Canadian geneticist Michael R. Hayden.

== The Judaica Collection of Max Raphael Hahn ==
Max Raphael Hahn was an important collector, and especially, although not only, a collector of Judaica, that is, of Jewish cult objects. His Judaica collection was of such high quality that it was published in the Philo-Lexikon. Handbuch des jüdischen Wissens (Handbook of Jewish Knowledge), first published by the Berlin Philo publishing house in 1934, they were mentioned in the same breath as the collections of the Rothschilds and the Sassoons. Max Raphael's father, Raphael Hahn, had already begun collecting Judaica, and his son Rudolf (Roger Hayden) and his sons Jonathan and Michael continued this tradition.

In 2011, the descendants of Max Raphael and Gertrud Hahn launched the Hahn Research Project. Through research in the holdings of the Städtisches Museum Göttingen, a number of objects belonging to the Hahn family were identified (furniture, arts and crafts objects, graphic art, etc.), which were officially returned to the family in 2014. They are now on permanent loan from the family to the Göttingen Municipal Museum. Subsequently, as part of the Hahn Research Project, further research was conducted into the whereabouts of the family's possessions and Judaica collection. With the help of catalog information and historical photographs from the family's holdings, the so-called Jacob's cup from the Hahn Collection was identified at the Museum für Kunstgewerbe in Hamburg. It was officially returned to the family in November 2018.

The fate of the Hahn Judaica collection, which was confiscated by the Nazis is the subject of the book "Das Vermächtnis des Max Raphael Hahn. Göttingen citizen and collector - a story of life and death, courageous perseverance, and the continuing power of family tradition," published by Hogrefe Verlag in 2014.

In 2019, the Vancouver Holocaust Education Centre held an exhibition on the history of the family and its collection.

== Memorials ==
On November 8, 2017, a memorial plaque for Mr. and Mrs. Hahn was unveiled at their villa in Merkelstraße.

Since February 7, 2018, eight Stolpersteine in front of the residential and commercial building at Weender Straße 70 in Göttingen commemorate the fate of Max Raphael Hahn and his relatives.

== See also ==
- Aryanization
- Reform Judaism
- Jewish ceremonial art
- The Holocaust
- Aktion Dünamünde
- The Holocaust in Latvia
