= Just Another Missing Kid =

- Directed by: John Zaritsky
- Produced by: Glenn Sarty; John Zaritsky
- Cinematography: John Griffin
- Edited by: Gordon McClennan
- Production company: CBC
- Distributed by: CBC
- Release date: 7 April 1981
- Running time: 90 minutes
- Country: Canada
- Language: English

Just Another Missing Kid is a 1981 Canadian documentary film, directed by John Zaritsky, about the search for a missing Ottawa teenager.

== Summary ==
Eric Wilson left his native Ottawa in July 1978 in a Volkswagen camper on a trip to Boulder, Colorado. Somewhere in Nebraska, he disappeared. The movie traces how his family and a private investigator work to find out what happened. The film focuses on how little help the various police forces were and is an indictment of the apathy and bureaucracy of the legal system on both sides of the border. Raymond Hatch and Bertram Davis, hitchhikers Wilson had picked up, eventually confessed to his murder. The long-time criminal and drifter Hatch, who had committed the murder, was sentenced to 26 years in prison, but was released after serving 13. In 1994, he stabbed his girlfriend with a knife and was convicted of assault for which he served 9 months in jail. In a follow-up to the story from 1995, The Fifth Estate reported that Hatch had resumed his drifting. He died in 2000.

== Accolades ==
Originally produced by CBC Television for the documentary news program The Fifth Estate, it was broadcast on CBC television to much acclaim in 1981. It was released in theatres in the United States in 1982. It was nominated for several international awards and won the 1983 Academy Award for Best Documentary Feature.

== Controversy ==
In this film, Zaritsky broke new ground for documentaries by having the interview subjects recreate their actions for the camera. This caused some controversy as some critics and filmmakers felt these recreations did not make it a true documentary. In later years, Zaritsky himself agreed the technique should not be used. However, it has since been widely used by other documentary filmmakers.

== Adaptation ==
The story was later re-told in fictionalized form in a made-for-television movie called Into Thin Air. The film starred Ellen Burstyn as the mother and was aired in 1985.

== Preservation ==
The Academy Film Archive preserved Just Another Missing Kid in 2007.
