= Charlotte Raven =

British writer (1969–2025)

- by Linda Nylind (crop)
- Born: 4 September 1969; Streatham, South London, England
- Died: 22 January 2025 (aged 55)
- Education: University of Manchester; University of Sussex
- Spouse: Tom Sheahan (div. 2016)
- Partner(s): Derek Draper; Julie Burchill (1995)
- Children: 2

Charlotte Raven (4 September 1969 – 22 January 2025) was a British author and journalist. She was named one of the BBC's 100 Women in 2013. She was awarded the Christopher Bland Prize in 2021 for the book she wrote, with her doctor, about her diagnosis of Huntington's Disease.

== Early life ==
Born in Streatham, South London on 4 September 1969, Raven studied English at the University of Manchester. As a Labour Club activist there in the late 1980s and early 1990s, she was part of a successful campaign to oust then student union communications officer Derek Draper, though she subsequently had a four-year relationship with him. She was University of Manchester Students' Union Women's Officer from 1990 until 1991 and presided over an election in which future Labour MP Liam Byrne failed to be elected as the Union's Welfare Officer. She later studied at the University of Sussex.

== Career ==
Raven was a contributor to the Modern Review, and the editor of the relaunched version in 1997. There she met Julie Burchill, with whom she had an affair in 1995: the two are pictured in the National Portrait Gallery. Her columns appeared frequently in The Guardian and New Statesman.

In 2013, it was announced that the feminist magazine Spare Rib would relaunch with Raven as the editor. It was subsequently announced that while a magazine and website were to be launched, it would have a different name.

== Controversies ==
Raven described herself as a narcissist and regularly wrote outspoken contrarian across The Guardian, New Statesman, and The Modern Review. Her writing frequently targeted popular consensus, public figures, and mainstream culture.

In January 2001, Raven wrote a review titled 'Crashing bore, wooden drama'. in The Guardian's G2 supplement, mocking the critical acclaim for the Ang Lee martial arts film Crouching Tiger, Hidden Dragon. Raven argued that the film's script was banal and only seemed profound to British audiences because it was in a foreign language, writing: "In Chinese, delivered inscrutably, it seemed to contain multitudes." The article was deemed to be offensive by the British Chinese website, Dimsum, where it was widely discussed

In 2001, Raven attacked Denise Fergus, the mother of a child murder victim, and the people of Liverpool in a Guardian article on the James Bulger case. The article generated a high level of complaints. In response, Guardian readers' editor Ian Mayes concluded that the article should not have been published.

== Personal life and death ==
Raven and her husband, filmmaker Tom Sheahan, had two children. They divorced in 2016.

In January 2010, she revealed that she had been diagnosed with Huntington's disease, an incurable hereditary disease, in January 2006 and had been contemplating suicide, an option she rejected after visiting a clinic in an area of Venezuela with a very high incidence of Huntington's disease. In 2019, she became patient 1 on the Roche Gen-Peak trial of a huntingtin protein-lowering drug tominersen. In 2021, she published a memoir, Patient 1, with her doctor Edward Wild on the experience of coming to terms with the diagnosis, the drug trial and the living with the illness as it affected her mind and body. Raven was shortlisted for the 2022 Royal Society of Literature Christopher Bland Prize for the book.

Raven died of Huntington's disease on 22 January 2025, at the age of 55.

== Recognition ==
Raven was recognised as one of the BBC's 100 women of 2013.
