= Romeo and Juliet in Sarajevo =

- Directed by: John Zaritsky
- Written by: John Zaritsky
- Produced by: Rainer Hoffmann; Steve Milosevic; Mark Starowicz; Virginia Storring; CBC; NFB; WDR
- Starring: Damir Andrei; Nancy Beatty; Amos Crawley
- Narrated by: Will Lyman
- Cinematography: Michael Savoie
- Edited by: Eric Goddard; Richard Wells
- Music by: Mason Daring
- Production company: PBS
- Distributed by: PBS Distribution
- Release date: May 10, 1994
- Running time: 90 minutes
- Country: Canada
- Language: English

Romeo and Juliet in Sarajevo is an international documentary about the deaths of Admira Ismić (born May 13, 1968) and Boško Brkić (Cyrillic: Бошко Бркић; born August 11, 1968). The couple were natives of Bosnia and Herzegovina living in the city of Sarajevo. Admira was a Bosniak, and Boško was a Bosnian Serb. They were killed by sniper fire on 19 May 1993, while trying to cross the Vrbanja bridge to the Serb-controlled territory of Grbavica. Mark H. Milstein's photograph of their dead bodies was used by numerous media outlets, and a Reuters dispatch about them was filed by Kurt Schork. The documentary was co-produced by PBS's Frontline, the Canadian Broadcasting Corporation, the National Film Board of Canada and WDR Germany. It was directed by John Zaritsky.

== Synopsis ==
The 1992–1996 Siege of Sarajevo by the Bosnian Serb Army (VRS) caused drastic deterioration in living conditions for its inhabitants. In 1993, Admira and Boško, a couple with connections across different ethnic groups, decided to escape the conflict. On 19 May 1993, the pair attempted to cross Vrbanja Bridge, part of Sniper Alley, hoping for a safe passage due to an alleged informal agreement that no one would fire during their crossing.

Accounts differ regarding the exact sequence of events. According to some sources, the couple approached the bridge at 17:00, when Boško was shot first, dying instantly. Admira, although wounded, managed to crawl to him, embrace him, and died moments later.

Journalist Michael Hedges was working with freelance photographer Mark Milstein the day the couple were shot, and they had joined up with Japanese video reporter Kuniomi Asai, who Hedges had met through a mutual friend.

Hedges recalled what the group witnessed this way:

After spending hours reporting on the increased Serbian artillery fire into Sarajevo, seeing a woman wounded by mortar fire and shelling from a tank and other Serb heavy weapons from across the river from Sarajevo, the group made their way to a Bosnian army outpost where soldiers were exchanging fire with Serb snipers.

There they saw the bodies of the slain couple.

“A Bosnian soldier motioned for me to look down and to the left, by a bridge across the river. The couple lay together. It appeared they had been shot earlier that day, but whether it had been minutes or hours ago, wasn’t clear,” Hedges recalled.

In a story published in the May 21, 1993 Washington Times, Hedges quoted the Bosnian soldier Nedzad Alajbegovic, who had showed him the bodies, saying, “They met and were running for the bridge but they didn’t make it…No one can say why they took the chance. It is too dangerous to get their bodies.”

The Bosnian soldiers blamed Serb snipers for the killings, but Hedges could not verify that independently.

“I went back to the Holiday Inn and wrote the initial story on the couple who were killed, that was published the next day,” Hedges said. “That evening, Kurt Schork came to my room, said he had seen Milstein’s photos and asked what I had seen. The next day he developed more of the story, and his piece was seen by CNN, BBC and other media outlets who followed with accounts on the couple’s relationship. It became a symbol of the senseless violence that was part of the war, and it captured people’s imagination.”

The two bodies remained in no man's land for several days, with Serb and Bosnian forces arguing over responsibility for their deaths and recovery. After eight days, Serb forces retrieved the bodies using Bosnian POWs, and the couple was later buried together at the "Groblje Lav" (The Lion Cemetery).

Kuniomi Asai, a war correspondent who accompanied soldiers at the front lines, recalls events differently. He reported that Sarajevo's Bosnian government initially restricted access to the front for foreign journalists. However, through his connections, Asai joined a platoon heading to the front and encountered photographer Mark Milstein, a stringer for Reuters, who pleaded to accompany them, desperate to capture compelling images.

Upon reaching a building overlooking the bridge, Asai claims they saw the bodies of the young couple, appearing as if the man had been shot first, and the woman had collapsed while trying to help him. Local soldiers identified the snipers as Serbian forces and described the couple as high school sweethearts attempting to escape the war.

Milstein’s photographs of the tragic scene were widely circulated by international media and used in Kurt Schork’s article, which turned the couple into a symbol of the senseless violence during the siege. Reflecting on the media’s influence, Asai expressed frustration with the Japanese news agency’s delayed interest in the footage he had captured, noting that they only pursued the story after it gained traction in Western media outlets.

The identities of the snipers remain unconfirmed, as no formal investigation was conducted. The deaths of Boško and Admira continue to symbolize the devastating human impact of the Bosnian War, remembered both as an emblem of love transcending conflict and as a tragic outcome of war.

== Cast ==
- Damir Andrei as Translation voice
- Nancy Beatty as Translation voice
- Amos Crawley as Translation voice
- Cynthia Eastman as Translation voice
- Louis Ferreira as Translation voice (as Justin Louis)
- Soo Garay as Translation voice
- Michael Hogan as Translation voice
- Charmion King as Translation voice

== Awards ==
For this film, director Zaritsky received the Alfred Dupont Award from the Columbia University Graduate School of Journalism as well as an Emmy Award nomination.

== See also ==
- Bill Madden – Bosko and Admira, from the 2008 album Child of the Same God.
- Up with People – Sang the song "Last Embrace", inspired by Boško and Admira's story as part of their show The Festival.
- Kurt Schork – The original dispatch by Kurt Schork, whose ashes are interred next to Bosko and Admira, telling the moving story of Romeo and Juliet in Sarajevo.
- Inela Nogić – Won the Miss Besieged Sarajevo contest in 1993.
- Jill Sobule – "Vrbana Bridge".
- Vedran Smailović – Known as the "Cellist of Sarajevo".
- "薩拉熱窩的羅密歐與茱麗葉" – exact translation in Chinese of "Romeo and Juliet in Sarajevo", from Sammi Cheng's 1994 album Ten Commandments.
