= Nancy Wexler =

American geneticist

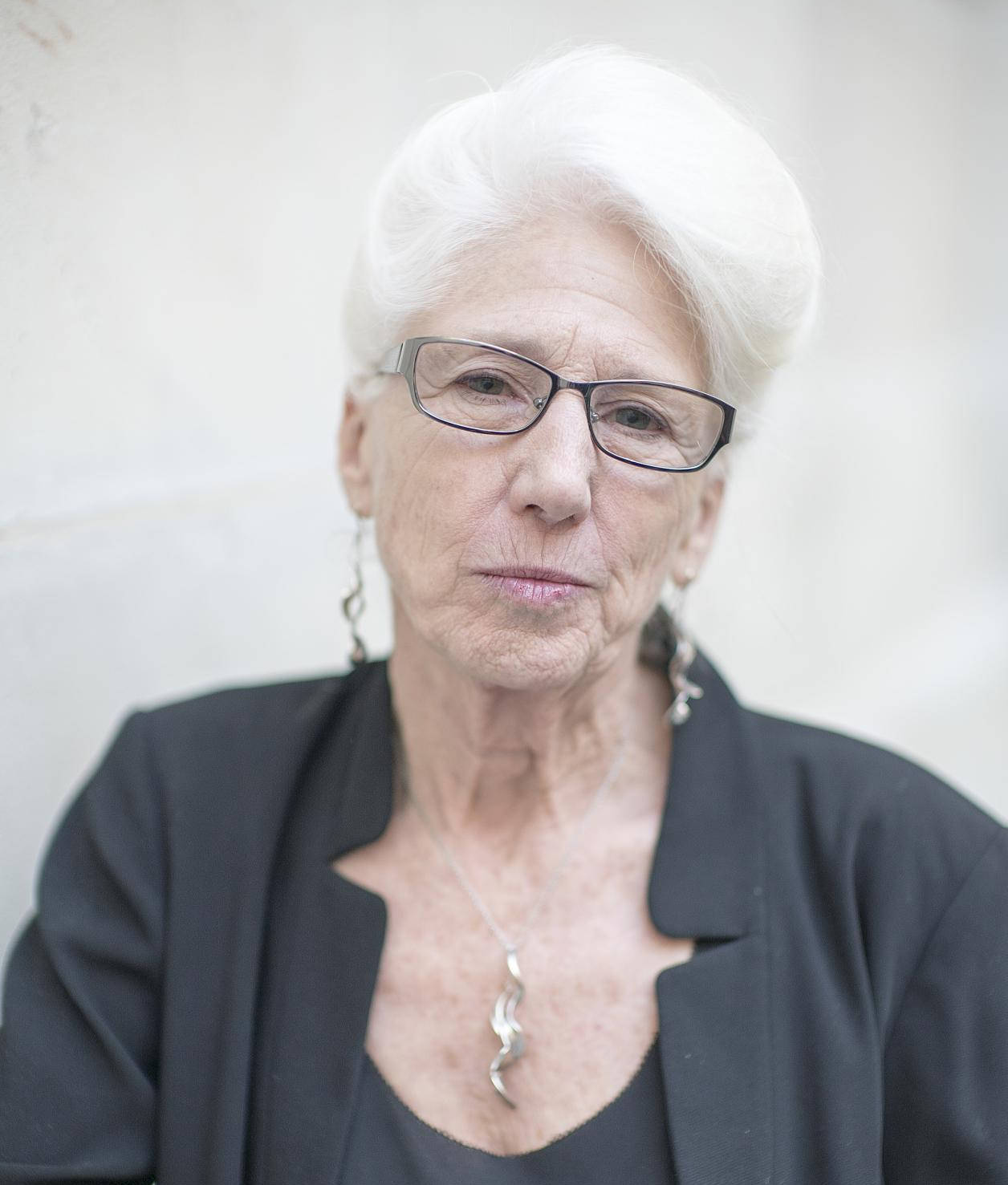
- Wexler in March 2015
- Born: July 19, 1945 (age 81)
- Education: Radcliffe College; University of Michigan
- Known for: Contributing to identification of the gene that causes Huntington's disease
- Awards: Benjamin Franklin Medal in Life Science (2007)
- Scientific career
- Fields: Genetics
- Workplaces: Columbia University

Nancy Wexler (born 19 July 1945) FRCP MEASA is an American geneticist and the Higgins Professor of Neuropsychology in the Departments of Neurology and Psychiatry of the Columbia University College of Physicians and Surgeons, best known for her involvement in the discovery of the location of the gene that causes Huntington's disease. She earned a Ph.D. in clinical psychology but instead chose to work in the field of genetics.

The daughter of someone exhibiting Huntington's, she led a research team into a remote part of Venezuela where the disease is prevalent. She visited the villages of Laguneta, San Luis, and Barranquitas. She obtained samples of DNA (deoxyribonucleic acid) from a large family with a majority of the members having Huntington's disease. The samples her team collected were instrumental in allowing a global collaborative research group to locate the gene that causes the disease. Wexler participated in the successful effort to create a chromosomal test to identify carriers of Huntington's disease.

== Early life and education ==
Nancy Wexler was born 19 July 1945, in Washington, D.C., and grew up in Pacific Palisades, California and Topeka, Kansas. Wexler's father, Dr. Milton Wexler, was a psychoanalyst and clinical psychologist, and her mother was a geneticist who taught biology before her children were born. Both parents taught the girls different areas of science, including the environment, nature, physics, and astronomy. Wexler's grandfather died when her mother, Leonore, was only 15 years old. Leonore looked up Huntington's disease (HD) at the library and read that it was a fatal, inherited disease, and (incorrectly) that it only affecting men. Leonore's three brothers, Seymour, Paul, and Jesse Sabin, all had HD and died within four years of each other. The diagnosis was kept a secret from the rest of the family for many years. The uncles were called "nervous," instead of ill. When Leonore started showing symptoms of HD, her then ex-husband, Milton, kept the diagnosis from her for about a year. She still thought that HD only affected men. When they finally told her she had HD, Nancy said, “Her mother did not protest. It seemed as if Leonore, knowing her family history, had perhaps understood the truth all along.”

Wexler thought at an early age she would want to know as much as possible about the disease. Nancy Wexler attended many workshops including her own. She was most impressed by the workshop of George Hunting which was a film showing Huntington disease patients as a part of a community near Lake Maracaibo in comparison to most U.S patients confined to nursing homes. Years later, Nancy became involved in the Venezuela research.

From 1963, Wexler studied for her A.B. in psychology at Radcliffe College, graduating in 1967. She then earned a PhD in clinical psychology from the University of Michigan in 1974. While studying for her A.B. she was required to take an introductory biology course, which constitutes "[her] only formal education in biology." In 1968 her father started the Hereditary Disease Foundation, which introduced her to scientists such as geneticists and molecular biologists. Along with textbooks and lectures she attends, the scientists "have really been [her] teachers since then." Nancy and her sister, Alice Wexler, both became very involved in the foundation and both became trustees. Nancy is now President of the foundation. The group raises funds for research on HD and related inherited diseases. They also sponsor interdisciplinary workshops for scientists who work on HD and other genetic diseases.

Her sister, Alice Wexler is three years older, and has her PhD in History and also contributed to the field of Huntington's. Nancy Wexler and the rest of the Wexler family feature prominently in Alice's book, Mapping Fate -A Memoir of Family, Risk, and Genetic Research that describes how the Wexlers coped with an affected mother while simultaneously trying to spearhead HD research. Alice Wexler also wrote a book on the social history of HD.

Education:

- 1963–1967 A.B. cum laude, Radcliffe College, Social Relations and English
- 1967–1968 University of West Indies, Jamaica on Fulbright Scholarship
- 1968 Hampstead Clinic Child Psychoanalytic Training Institute, London, England
- 1968–1974 Ph.D., University of Michigan, Clinical Psychology

Wexler did her thesis on Huntington's disease, focusing on how it felt to be at risk for the disease.

== Career ==
In 1976 the U.S. Congress formed the Commission for the Control of Huntington's Disease, and as part of their work, Wexler and the team travelled to Barranquitas and Lagunetas, two settlements on Lake Maracaibo, Venezuela, where villagers had a particularly high occurrence of Huntington's. Starting in 1979, the team conducted a twenty-year-long study in which they collected over 4,000 blood samples and documented 18,000 different individuals to work out a common pedigree. The discovery that the gene was on the tip of chromosome 4 led to the development of a test for the disease. For her work, she has been awarded the Mary Woodard Lasker Award for Public Service, the Benjamin Franklin Medal in Life Science (2007), and honorary doctorates from New York Medical College, the University of Michigan, Bard College and Yale University. She is a fellow of the Hastings Center, an independent bioethics research institution.

Wexler's mother's symptoms progressed from fingers moving constantly, to uncontrollable motions. Nancy explains, “When she sat, her spasmodic body movements would propel her chair along the floor until it reached a wall, her head would bang repeatedly against the wall. To keep her from hurting herself at night, her bed was padded with lamb’s wool.” She continued to lose weight; she needed to consume at least 5,000 calories a day because of her unique metabolism. She died on Mother's Day, 1978.

Wexler continued her research of the HD disease and credits her ambition and motivation to her father, Milton Wexler; he and her sister Alice worked closely with her for years until her father turned his work over to her and her colleagues, feeling that science had become too complicated for him.

Wexler has held many public policy positions, including: Chair of the Joint NIH/DOE Ethical, Legal and Social Issues Working Group of the National Human Genome Research Institute; Chair of HUGO, the Human Genome Organization; and member of the Institute of Medicine. She has served on the American Association for the Advancement of Science board of directors, and the advisory committee on Research on Women's Health, NIH.

Nancy Wexler revealed in a 2020 New York Times interview that she has Huntington's disease. An episode of The Gene also tells the story of her learning she has Huntington's disease after years of not getting tested. Wexler has written a memoir about her experience as a scientist in search of a cure for the disease that now affects her My Life, My Science: Pursuing a Cure for Huntington's Disease.

== Huntington's disease location ==
In taking over the work of her father, Nancy Wexler met with many issues and difficulties. The goal of Wexler's research was to continue the work. The studies were done on maternal and fraternal parents with Huntington's disease. For years the researchers used DNA to study DNA of Huntington's disease patients.

Nancy Wexler first encountered the idea of using polymorphisms as markers in October 1979. She was hosting a workshop and listened as key theorists explained their visions of gene hunting and was struck with the idea. It was from her idea that James F. Gusella focused on finding HD markers. He quickly hit upon the marker that would determine if a person had HD. Wexler gave Gusella samples of blood that she had collected from people in Venezuela and one after another, the samples confirmed the early finding.

Huntington's disease is one of several trinucleotide repeat disorders which are caused by the length of a repeated section of a gene exceeding a normal range. The HTT gene is located on the short arm of chromosome 4 at 4p16.3. HTT contains a sequence of three DNA bases—cytosine-adenine-guanine (CAG)—repeated multiple times (i.e. ... CAGCAGCAG ...), known as a trinucleotide repeat. CAG is the genetic code for the amino acid glutamine, so a series of them results in the production of a chain of glutamine known as a polyglutamine tract (or polyQ tract), and the repeated part of the gene, the PolyQ region.

== Presymptomatic and prenatal testing ==
Since 1986, presymptomatic and prenatal testing for HD has been available internationally. Nancy Wexler served as a director of a program that provided presymptomatic and prenatal testing for Huntington's disease. She also worked as a counselor in this program and had the opportunity to speak with over 100 individuals regarding testing. Regarding prenatal testing, Wexler believes that in-depth and detailed counseling must accompany both disclosing and nondisclosing testing.

Because the disease had no treatment or cure it was hard to get participants for many of the research studies. Patients would sometimes become depressed and even suicidal, not wanting to deal with 50 – 90% chance of inheriting the disease. Before the gene location was identified definitively, early methods of testing for HD made use of closely linked markers for the gene to determine whether a person had a very high likelihood of either escaping or developing the disease. Thus, the client can be told the test is noninformative.

Wexler and her sister Alice never wanted to know the results of the testing. Wexler learned that the disease was usually detected in midlife, but was sometimes found in children as young as two years old. The disease would affect the muscles that control swallowing.

Wexler would often take her research personally because of her family ties to the disease. She would often associate things that happened to her as symptoms of the HD. Wexler had pondered her own decision. “I wonder if I would really be that much happier if I knew I wouldn’t get the disease.” Yet she is tantalized by the chance to know. “When my sister and I both decided not to have children,” she says, “neither of us ever expected anything to happen in our lifetime that might change that.” Wexler did not stop outside research projects although battling with her own testing. Testing was done in Canada, Great Britain and Europe.

There are two types of prenatal tests being offered as a part of the presymptomatic testing program. The main form of prenatal testing that is most frequently requested is known as exclusion testing. Exclusion testing tells if the fetus has inherited the short arm of chromosome 4 from a particular parent. This test is valuable in two situations: one, when at-risk parents do not have sufficient information on the genetics of their families to determine their own genotype and two, when at-risk parents prefer not to know their own genotypes. If the fetus is shown to have a short arm of chromosome 4 from the affected or at-risk parent, then the parents are faced with the choice of aborting the fetus that has a 50% chance of developing the disease. The test provides 96% accuracy whether or not a person will develop the disease.

== Personal views on genetic counseling ==
Wexler believes that people who come for presymptomatic testing will benefit from intensive counseling, sometimes in lieu of the test itself. Her beliefs regarding counseling stem from her own experience regarding presymptomatic testing and also talking with colleagues in other programs. Being at risk has had a profound effect on most people's lives. They may have had an ill parent, with whom they may or may not have had contact, and perhaps other relatives who have had HD. Almost all welcome the opportunity to talk with someone knowledgeable about the experience that they are going through. Wexler states that, “The genetic test gives people a crystal ball to see the future: will the city be free of bombs from now on or will a bomb crash into their home, killing them and jeopardizing their children?”

== Tetrabenazine ==
On December 6, 2007, Prestwick Pharmaceuticals presented information to the United States Food and Drug Administration (FDA) regarding tetrabenazine. Tetrabenazine was a drug that helped treat chorea, a symptom associated with Huntington's disease. Wexler posted a note of action to her Hereditary Disease Foundation regarding the safety of this drug. In her letter, Wexler stated that she would speak in front of the FDA committee regarding her own personal experience with HD and why she believed tetrabenazine could benefit those with HD. Until this point, there were no approved treatments in the United States for chorea associated with HD. She urged patients with chorea to speak to the potential for this much needed use of tetrabenazine. It was with the aid of Nancy Wexler that tetrabenazine was able to be approved by the FDA.
