= Centre for Molecular Medicine and Therapeutics =

The Centre for Molecular Medicine and Therapeutics
- Established: 1996
- Staff: Over 200 staff, including 8 Faculty, 59 trainees, and 10 administrative team members
- Location: Vancouver, British Columbia, Canada
- Website: www.cmmt.ubc.ca

The Centre for Molecular Medicine and Therapeutics (CMMT) is part of the University of British Columbia's Faculty of Medicine. The Centre is located at the British Columbia Children's Hospital Research Institute (BCCHR) in Vancouver, British Columbia, Canada. Research at CMMT is focused on discovering genetic susceptibility to illnesses such as Huntington Disease, Type 2 diabetes and bipolar disorder.

In 2008, the founder of CMMT, Dr. Michael Hayden, was named "Researcher of the Year" by the Canada Institutes of Health Research. In 2011, he was appointed to the Order of Canada in 2011 for his contributions to Huntington's Disease research.

Principal investigators within the Centre are involved in other initiatives. Dr. Daniel Goldowitz is the Scientific Director of the Kids Brain Health network (formerly NeuroDevNet), which is a Canada Networks of Centres of Excellence. The life sciences research laboratory consists of over 200 staff, eight of whom are UBC faculty members. Four of the principal investigators at the Centre are Canada Research Chairs.

== Key achievements ==
- 1999 – ABCA1 a key regulator of high-density lipoprotein in humans is discovered
- 2003 – LPL deficiency is cured in animal models
- 2004 – Open-access JASPAR database is released - a fundamental resource for studying gene regulation
- 2005 – Gene networks analysis algorithm published
- 2006 – Huntington Disease is treated in mouse model
- 2006 – The genetic cause of codeine-induced adverse drug reaction causing infant death is identified
- 2006 – A new palmitoyl transferase that promotes protein folding and transport is identified
- 2007 – The contribution of cholesterol to diabetes is elucidated
- 2007 – New software for identifying DNA changes that alter the regulation of genes is created
- 2007 – A severe Adverse Drug Reaction caused by normal doses of codeine is identified.
- 2008 – A new gene associated with bipolar disorder is identified
- 2008 – Genomics analysis of endosomal transport machinery is completed
- 2008 – Genetic Variants predictive of severe deafness in children receiving Cisplatin chemotherapy are identified
- 2009 – Researchers identify memantine as possible treatment for Huntington Disease
- 2009 - National headquarters for genetics, epigenetics data collection and analysis for the Canadian Longitudinal Study on Aging is established
- 2009 - Early-life poverty can "get under the skin" to program pro-inflammatory gene expression profiles
- 2009 - Dr. Daniel Goldowitz becomes Scientific Director of NeuroDevNet 2009-2014
- 2010 – Discovery of increased expression of NMDA receptors in Huntington's disease
- 2010 – Treatment with memantine leads to the reversal of motor and neuropathological deficits and damage in late stages of animal models of HD.
- 2011 - Parental stress in infancy and pre-school is associated with distinct DNA methylation patterns in adolescents
- 2012 - PFOND project launched online to promote the sharing of information about research, treatment, and resources for rare genetic disorders
- 2012 - Dr. Elizabeth Simpson leads CanEuCre, a large-scale genomic consortium, funded by Genome British Columbia in Canada (Can) and partnered with the European Commission (Eu), for the development of new Cre mouse and virus resources (Cre)
- 2012 - Journal of Huntington Disease (JHD) is established with Dr. Blair Leavitt as Co-Editor-in-Chief

== Corporate history ==
CMMT's development started in the early nineties with an informal discussion between CMMT's current Director, Dr. Michael Hayden, and Merck Frosst. In 1992, a $15 million commitment over five years from Merck Frosst Canada provided the initial funding for CMMT. The following year, in 1993, UBC Board of Governors and Senate approved CMMT as the first Centre in the Faculty of Medicine. That same year, the province of British Columbia pledged $9 million to build a dedicated building for CMMT.

In 1998, the current CMMT building, located at the Child & Family Research Institute on the BC Children's and Women's Hospital site was completed and the Transgenic Core Facility was established. During 1999 and 2000, the Scientific Stores Core Facility and the DNA Sequencing Core Facility were established.

Since 2000, CMMT has further expanded its facilities and services, including the addition of a Bioanalyzer Core Facility in 2003, expansion of the Transgenic Core Facility in 2005 and the establishment of the Genotype and Gene Expression Core Facility in 2006.

== Principal investigators ==
- Dr. Elizabeth Conibear – Associate Professor, Department of Medical Genetics
- Dr. Daniel Goldowitz – Canada Research Chair Tier I & Professor, Department of Medical Genetics
- Dr. Michael Hayden - Founder, Professor, Department of Medical Genetics
- Dr. Michael S. Kobor – Assistant Professor, Department of Medical Genetics
- Dr. Blair R. Leavitt – Director, Assistant Professor, Department of Medical Genetics
- Dr. Elizabeth M. Simpson – Canada Research Chair Tier II & Professor, Department of Medical Genetics
- Dr. Stefan Taubert – Canada Research Chair Tier II & Assistant Professor, Department of Medical Genetics
- Dr. Wyeth W. Wasserman – Professor, Department of Medical Genetics
- Dr. Sara Mostafavi – Canada Research Chair Tier II & Assistant Professor, Department of Statistics, Department of Medical Genetics

== Areas of research ==
- Bioinformatics
- Developmental Biology
- Epigenetics
- Lipid Biology
- Neurobiology
- Pharmacogenomics
- Transgenics
