= Huntington Society of Canada =

- Société Huntington du Canada
- Founded: 1973
- Type: Health Charity
- Purpose: Care, support, fundraising and research for Huntington disease
- Location: Waterloo, Ontario
- Region served: Canada
- Key people: Shelly Redman, CEO
- Employees: 10-15
- Website: www.huntingtonsociety.ca

The Huntington Society of Canada (HSC) (French: Société Huntington du Canada, SHC) is a non-profit organisation that supports people in Canada affected by the genetic neurodegenerative brain condition Huntington's disease (HD).

The HSC was founded in 1973 and is based in Waterloo, Ontario. It delivers support services to patients and carers, provides educational resources and funds research into the development of Huntington's disease treatments.

The HSC's logo depicts a stylized amaryllis flower, an internationally used symbol of the movement to combat HD.
