= John Zaritsky =

Canadian filmmaker-documentarian

John Zaritksy
- Born: John Norman Zaritsky; 13 July 1943; St. Catharines, Ontario, Canada
- Died: 30 March 2022 (aged 78); Vancouver, British Columbia, Canada
- Education: University of Toronto
- Occupations: Director; producer; writer
- Years active: 1976–2016
- Awards: Academy Award; Gemini Award; CableACE Award; Alfred I. duPont–Columbia University Award; Golden Gavel Award; Hot Docs Special Jury Award; Chris Award; Golden Sheaf Award; Leo Award; Vancouver International Film Festival Award; ACTRA Award

John Zaritsky (13 July 1943 – 30 March 2022) was a Canadian documentarian/filmmaker. His work has been broadcast in 35 countries and screened at more than 40 film festivals around the world; in 1983, his film Just Another Missing Kid won the Academy Award for Best Documentary Feature.

== Early life and education ==
Zaritsky was born in St. Catharines, Ontario, the eldest of four children of Yvonne Joan (née White), a nurse, and Dr. Michael Zaritsky, a physician of Ukrainian heritage. He graduated from Denis Morris Catholic High School in 1961, then studied English and History at the University of Toronto's Trinity College, graduating in 1965.

== Journalism ==
His first job was as a current affairs story editor at the CBC, but he left to take the job of police reporter at The Hamilton Spectator. He then moved to the Kitchener-Waterloo Record, where he was an education reporter, art critic and book reviewer. In 1968, he became a political reporter at the Toronto Star. In 1970, he received a Ford Foundation Fellowship to study at the Washington Journalism Center. In 1971, he went to work as a reporter at The Globe and Mail; in 1972, he won a National Newspaper Award for his investigative reporting, and a photography award from The Canadian Press. In 1973, he returned to the CBC as an investigative reporter; in 1975, the CBC created the documentary program the fifth estate and Zaritsky was one of five people tapped to create the show's films.

== Film career ==
=== CBC - the fifth estate ===
Zaritsky worked at the fifth estate until 1985, producing and directing the documentaries The Loser's Game, Charity Begins at Home, Caring for Crisler, Just Another Missing Kid, Bjorn Borg, and I'll Get There Somehow. Also for the CBC, he created a documentary about the creation of the fundraising song Tears Are Not Enough. Just Another Missing Kid was screened internationally, was nominated for numerous awards, and won a 1982 ACTRA Award and the 1983 Academy Award for Best Documentary Feature.

By 1982, Zaritsky had married producer Virginia Storring and the two formed their own production company, KA Productions. In 1985, Zaritsky left the CBC as an employee and, as contractors, he and Storring produced two films for the CBC--Tears Are Not Enough and The Real Stuff, a documentary about the Snowbirds which would later air on Frontline. Their third documentary, produced with Robert M. Cooper, was 1986's Rapists: Can They Be Stopped?, a film about possible treatments for sex offenders which won the 1987 CableACE Award for Best Informational Special.

Also in 1987, for the CBC, Zaritsky began work on his trilogy about birth defects caused by the anti-morning sickness drug Thalidomide. The first, Broken Promises was released in 1989. The second, Extraordinary People, was released in 1999; No Limits: The Thalidomide Saga, a damning indictment of the German pharmaceutical company Grünenthal, was released at Vancouver's DOXA Documentary Film Festival in 2016.

Zaritsky produced one other documentary for the CBC's Documentary Channel—2014's, A Different Drummer: Celebrating Eccentrics.

=== PBS - Frontline ===
In 1986, Zaritsky and Storring were contracted by PBS to produce documentaries for Frontline. They would stay with Frontline for ten years, producing My Husband is Going to Kill Me, AIDS Quarterly: Born in Africa, My Doctor, My Lover, Choosing Death (aka An Appointment With Death), Romeo and Juliet in Sarajevo, Murder on Abortion Row, and Little Criminals. In 2006, Zaritsky produced and directed Right to Die?; it premiered in 2007 and Frontline released it as The Suicide Tourist in 2010.

At the 6th Gemini Awards, Zaritsky won the award for Best Writing in an Information/Documentary Program or Series for My Doctor, My Lover. My Husband is Going to Kill Me won the American Bar Association's Golden Gavel Award, and Romeo and Juliet in Sarajevo won the Alfred I. duPont–Columbia University Award. At the 5th Gemini Awards, AIDS Quarterly: Born in Africa won the Best Direction in a Documentary and Best Writing in a Documentary awards; it also won the won a Robert F. Kennedy Foundation Award. Choosing Death, released in some markets as An Appointment With Death, won the Best Direction in an Information or Documentary Program or Series at the 8th Gemini Awards. The Suicide Tourist, released in some markets as Right to Die?, which documented the assisted suicide of Craig Ewert by the group Dignitas, won the Best Writing in a Documentary Program or Series award at the 23rd Gemini Awards and the Best Documentary Program award at the 2008 Leo Awards. It also attracted extraordinary publicity in Britain when it aired there in December 2008. According to the Associated Press, "The documentary ... has been shown on Canadian and Swiss TV and at numerous film festivals, where it provoked little controversy. But it struck a raw nerve in Britain, where the divisive debate over assisted suicide remains unresolved."

At this point, Zaritsky and Storring were living in Los Angeles. They divorced and, after spending the 1995–96 year as an Artist-in-Residence at the UC Berkeley Graduate School of Journalism, Zaritsky moved to Vancouver.

=== Independent productions ===
Zaritsky formed Point Grey Pictures (not to be confused with the company of the same name formed in 2011 by Seth Rogen and Evan Goldberg). In addition to completing the Thalidomide trilogy and making Right to Die?, he produced two films for the National Film Board of Canada—Ski Bums and The Wild Horse Redemption. He also created Men Don't Cry: Prostate Cancer Stories, No Kidding: The Search for the World's Funniest Joke, College Days, College Nights and Leave Them Laughing.

To create College Days, College Nights, Zaritsky became Film Production Adjunct Professor in the Department of Theatre, Film and Creative Writing, at the University of British Columbia and, over the course of the 2003-04 academic year, had eight UBC film students follow the lives of 16 undergraduates. The 6-hour film aired in three parts on the CBC's Documentary Channel. At the 20th Gemini Awards, Zaritsky won for Best Direction in a Documentary Series.

2010's Leave Them Laughing: A Musical Comedy About Dying follows singer and comedian Carla Zilber-Smith after she is diagnosed with Lou Gehrig's Disease. At the 2010 Hot Docs Canadian International Documentary Festival, the film won the Hot Docs Award for Best Canadian Feature Documentary Special Jury Prize. It also won the People's Choice Award for Best Canadian Documentary at the Vancouver International Film Festival, the Directors' Choice Award at the 2011 Sedona International Film Festival, the Audience Choice award for best Documentary at the Mill Valley Film Festival, Best of Festival at Calgary's Picture This...International Film Festival, and Best on the Edge in New Zealand's 2011 "Documentary Edge Film Festival."

In 2012 he directed Do You Really Want To Know? which recounts the stories of three families whose relatives died of Huntington's Disease. Members of each featured family underwent predictive testing to learn whether or not they have inherited the gene that causes the disease. Do You Really Want To Know? received two Golden Sheaf Awards at the Yorkton Film Festival: Best Documentary (Science/Medicine/Technology), and Best Director (Non-Fiction); a Chris Award at the Columbus International Film & Video Festival for Best Documentary in the Science + Technology division, and the Best Documentary award at the Okanagan Film Festival. Its broadcast premiere was on 13 November 2012 on the Knowledge Network.

In 2017, filmmaker Jennifer DiCresce and cinematographer Michael Savoie produced the documentary Mr. Zaritsky on TV, which reviews Zaritsky's career and offers a behind-the-scenes look at Zaritsky's process.

== Personal life and death ==
In 2010, Zaritsky married Vancouver caterer Annie Clutton. He died of congestive heart failure at Vancouver General Hospital on 20 March 2022, at age 78. He was survived by his wife, one step-daughter and two grandchildren. At the time of his death, Zaritsky was working on his autobiography.

== Filmography ==
- The Loser's Game - the fifth estate, Canadian Broadcasting Corporation 1977
- Charity Begins at Home - the fifth estate, Canadian Broadcasting Corporation 1978
- Caring for Crisler - the fifth estate, Canadian Broadcasting Corporation 1979
- Just Another Missing Kid - the fifth estate, Canadian Broadcasting Corporation 1981
- Bjorn Borg - the fifth estate, Canadian Broadcasting Corporation 1983
- I'll Get There Somehow - the fifth estate, Canadian Broadcasting Corporation 1985
- Tears Are Not Enough - KA Productions, Canadian Broadcasting Corporation 1985
- Rapists: Can They be Stopped? - KA Productions, HBO 1986
- The Real Stuff - KA Productions, Canadian Broadcasting Corporation 1987
- My Husband is Going to Kill Me - Frontline, PBS 1987
- Broken Promises - KA Productions, Canadian Broadcasting Corporation 1989
- AIDS Quarterly: Born in Africa - Frontline KA Productions, PBS 1990
- My Doctor, My Lover - Frontline, PBS 1991
- Choosing Death: A Health Quarterly Special aka An Appointment With Death- Frontline, PBS 1993
- Romeo and Juliet in Sarajevo - KA Productions, PBS, Canadian Broadcasting Corporation, Westdeutscher Rundfunk 1994
- Murder on Abortion Row - Frontline, KA Productions, PBS 1996
- Little Criminals - Frontline, KA Productions, PBS 1997
- Extraordinary People - Canadian Broadcasting Corporation 1999
- Ski Bums - National Film Board of Canada 2001
- Men Don't Cry: Prostate Cancer Stories - Point Grey Pictures 2003
- No Kidding: The Search for the World's Funniest Joke - Point Grey Pictures 2003
- College Days, College Nights - Point Grey Pictures 2005
- The Wild Horse Redemption - National Film Board of Canada 2007
- Right to Die? aka The Suicide Tourist (2007) - Frontline PBS 2010
- Leave Them Laughing: A Musical Comedy About Dying - Magical Flute Films 2010
- Do You Really Want to Know? - Optic Nerve Films 2012
- A Different Drummer: Celebrating Eccentrics - Canadian Broadcasting Corporation 2014
- No Limits: The Thalidomide Saga - Canadian Broadcasting Corporation 2016

== Sources ==
- "Zaritsky, John Norman," in: The Canadian Who's Who, Vol. 32, 1997, p. 1349.
