= Huntington's Disease Society of America =

US non-profit organization

- Founded: 1967
- Purpose: Research into Huntington's disease and support for affected people and their families
- Location: New York City
- Region served: US
- Key people: Louise Vetter (CEO)
- Website: hdsa.org

The Huntington's Disease Society of America is a US non-profit organization dedicated to improving the lives of those affected by Huntington's disease (HD), an incurable, genetically transmitted degenerative disease of the nervous system that affects movement, thinking, and some aspects of personality.

The Huntington's Disease Society of America is the largest 501(c)(3) non-profit volunteer organization dedicated to improving the lives of everyone affected by Huntington's Disease. Founded in 1967 by Marjorie Guthrie, wife of folk legend Woody Guthrie, who died of HD, the Society works to provide the family services, education, advocacy and research for the more than 41,000 people diagnosed with HD in the United States.

HDSA supports and participates in the HD Drug Research Pipeline, which develops potential therapies to treat and eventually cure HD; and HDSA also supports 50+ HDSA Centers of Excellence at major medical facilities throughout the US, where people with HD and their families receive comprehensive medical, psychological and social services, in addition to physical and occupational therapy and genetic testing and counseling. The Society comprises 50+ volunteer-led local chapters and affiliates across the country with its headquarters in New York City. Additionally, HDSA hosts more than 200 support groups for people with HD, their families, caregivers and people at-risk, and is a resource on HD for medical professionals and the general public.
