= Suicide in Switzerland =

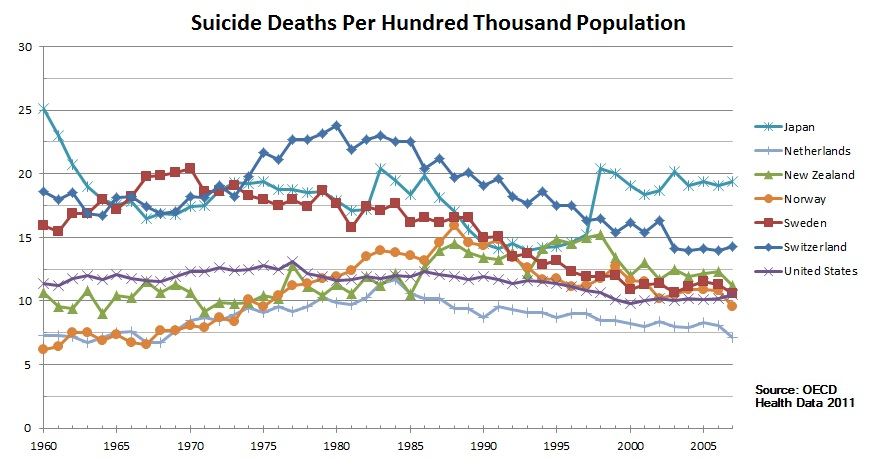
Age-standardized suicide rates for 1960–2011 as published by the OECD (2011) for Japan, the Netherlands, New Zealand, Norway, Sweden, Switzerland, and the United States.

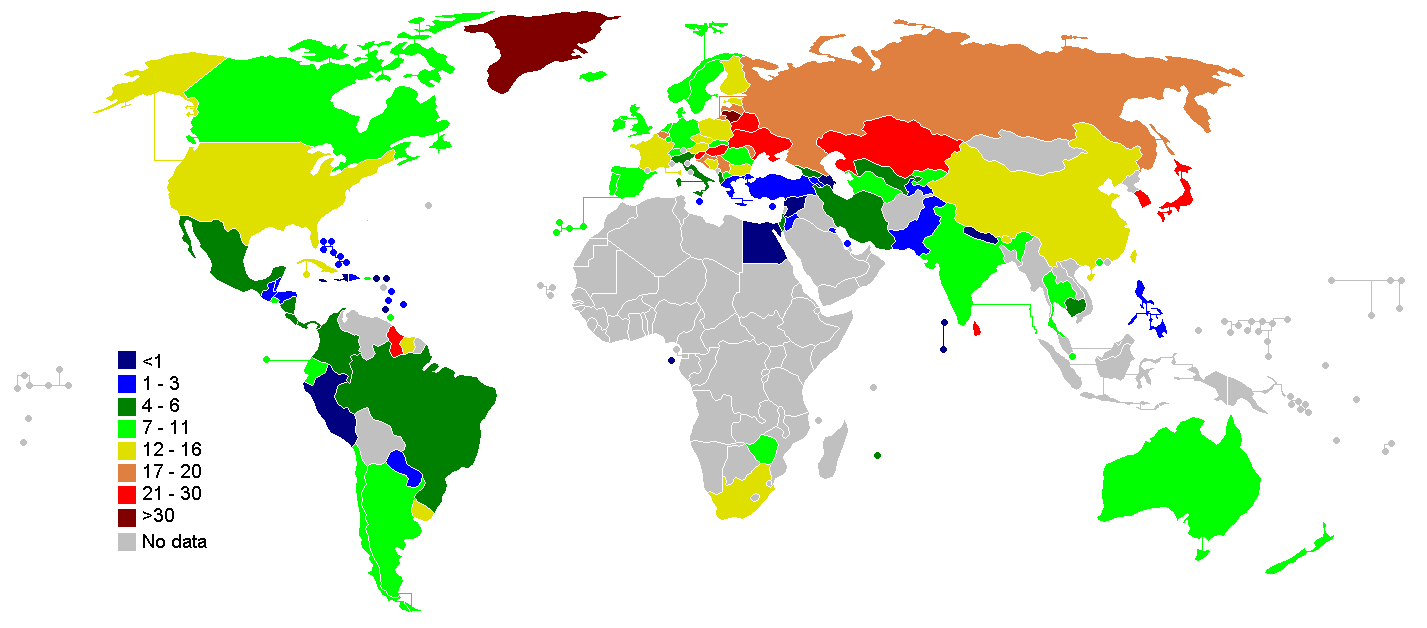
Switzerland's suicide rate per 100,000 people compared to other countries, according to the World Health Organization, Geneva. Peeter Värnik.

Switzerland had a standardised suicide rate of 10.7 per 100,000 (male 15.5, female 6.0) as of 2015. The actual (non-standardised) rate was 12.5 (male 18.5, female 6.6) in 2014.

== Statistics ==
The 2015 Swiss suicide rate of 10.7 (male 15.5, female 6.0) published by the World Health Organization is "age-standardised", attempting to control for differences in age structure for the purposes of international comparison. The standardised Swiss suicide rate is similar to the rates of neighbouring France (12.7; male 19.0, female 5.9), Austria (11.7; male 18.5, female 5.3) and Germany (9.1; male 14.5, female 4.5). It is somewhat below the European average of 11.93, and close to the global average of 10.67.

The raw (non-standardised) Swiss suicide rate is somewhat higher; in 2014, 1,029 people committed non-assisted suicide (754 men, 275 women), for a rate of 12.5 per 100,000 (18.5 male, 6.6 female). Not included are 742 assisted suicides (320 men, 422 women); most of the assisted suicides concerned elderly people suffering from a terminal disease.

The Swiss statistics of causes of death by years of potential life lost (YPLL) as of 2014 estimates suicides at 12,323 YPLL for men (12% of YPLL from all causes of death) and 4,750 YPLL for women (8% of YPLL from all causes of death). Standardised rates of YPLL per 100,000 people relative to the 2010 European standard population (Eurostat 2013) are 327.0 for men (29 hours per capita) and 128.6 (11 hours per capita) for women.

The suicide rate has declined steadily during the 1980s to 2000s, down from 25 in the mid 1980s. Since ca. 2010, the downward trend has stopped and there has been no further significant reduction in suicide rates. The peak in the 1980s was preceded by a historically low rate of 17 in the 1960s. The male-to-female gender ratio has been reduced from 6:1 in the late 19th century to about 2.5:1 today. In 1881, male suicide rate was at 42, close to 2.5 times the modern value, while female suicide rate was at 7, comparable to the modern value.

The Swiss cantons with the highest suicide rates for the period 2001–2010 were Appenzell Ausserrhoden for men (37) and canton of Schaffhausen for women (10); the canton with the lowest suicide rate was Italian-speaking Ticino (male 14, female 5), consistent with lower rates in southern Europe, but still notably higher than the rate in neighbouring Italy (at 5.4 as of 2015).

A statistic of suicide methods compiled for the period of 2001–2012 found that the preferred suicide method for men was by shooting (29.7%), followed by hanging (28.7%), poison (16.5%), jumping from a height (9.8%) and by train (7.9%). The statistics for women are markedly different, the most preferred method being poison (38.8%), and higher rates for jumping from a height (16.0%) and suicide by train (9.5%), but lower rates for hanging (18.5%) and shooting (3.0%).

== Assisted suicide ==
In 2014, a total of 742 assisted suicides (320 men, 422 women) had been recorded, or 1.2% of deaths in the resident population of Switzerland. This amounts to an increase of more than 250% compared to 2009; while the total suicide rate has been declining since the 1980s, assisted suicides have increased significantly since 2000. In 94% of cases, the people opting for assisted suicide were above 55 years of age, and in the majority of cases they were suffering from a terminal disease (42% cancer, 14% neurodegeneration (e.g. Parkinson's), 11% cardiovascular diseases, 10% musculoskeletal disorders). The rate was highest in the canton of Zürich (1.4% of deaths), followed by Geneva (1.3%).

Assisted suicide has been legal since 1941 if performed by a non-physician without a vested interest in that individual's death. The law prohibits doctors, spouses, children, or other such related parties from directly participating in one's death. Many citizens from other countries cross over into Switzerland to end their lives. In 2011, a proposed ban of this practice of "suicide tourism" was rejected by popular vote in the canton of Zürich with a 78% majority. The laws regulating assisted suicide do not limit the practice to the terminally ill, it is only necessary that the person seeking assisted suicide does so while in full possession of their decision-making capacity (and indeed the statistics on assisted suicide show a minority of cases citing depression as relevant illness). The Swiss government in 2011 nevertheless announced its intention to seek a change in its laws "to make sure it was used only as a last resort by the terminally ill". Dignitas, a Swiss group that facilitates suicide, requires that patients provide specific doctor's proof and prognosis in writing specifying terminal illness.

=== Publicized cases ===
In January 2006, British doctor Anne Turner took her own life in a Zurich clinic, having developed an incurable degenerative disease. Her story was reported by the BBC, and in 2009 made into a TV film A Short Stay in Switzerland.

In July 2009, British conductor Sir Edward Downes and his wife, Joan, died together at a suicide clinic outside Zürich "under circumstances of their own choosing". Sir Edward was not terminally ill, but his wife was diagnosed with rapidly developing cancer.

=== Cantonal referendums ===
In May 2011, Canton Zurich held a referendum that asked voters whether (i) assisted suicide should be prohibited outright; and (ii) whether Dignitas and other assisted suicide providers should not admit overseas users. Zurich voters heavily rejected both bans, despite anti-euthanasia lobbying from two Swiss social conservative political parties, the Evangelical People's Party of Switzerland and Federal Democratic Union. The outright ban proposal was rejected by 84% of voters, while 78% voted to keep services open should foreign users desire them.

== See also ==
- Demographics of Switzerland
- Epidemiology of suicide
- List of countries by suicide rate
- Euthanasia in Switzerland
