= List of English-language expressions related to death =

This is a list of words and phrases related to death in alphabetical order. While some of them are slang, others euphemize the unpleasantness of the subject, or are used in formal contexts. Some of the phrases may carry the meaning of 'kill', or simply contain words related to death. Most of them are idioms.

Expression	Definition	Context	Notes
At peace	Dead	Euphemistic	
At rest	Dead	Polite	
Augered in	Died via aircraft crash	Slang	As documented in The Right Stuff by Tom Wolfe
Belly up	Dead	Informal	The orientation of fish when dead
Beyond the grave	After death	Neutral	In reference to communication with the dead
Beyond the veil	The mysterious place after death	Neutral	Originally used to refer to the 'veil' that hides the innermost sanctuary of the Temple in Jerusalem. Sometimes refers to just a mysterious place.
Big sleep	To die or be killed	Euphemistic	Could be in reference to Raymond Chandler's 'The Big Sleep'
Bite the dust	To die or be killed	Informal	Also means 'failed'
Bite the big one	To die	Informal	North American.
Born asleep	Stillbirth	Neutral	
Breathe one's last	To die	Literary	
Brown bread	Dead	Slang	Cockney rhyming slang for 'dead'.
Bought the farm	Died	Slang	Also, shortened to 'bought it'
Bucket list	List of things to do before dying	Popular culture derivation	Derived from the older phrase "kick the bucket"; popularized by the 2007 film The Bucket List
Cargo 200	Corpses of soldiers	Military slang	Military code word used in the Soviet Union and the post-Soviet states referring to the transportation of military casualties
Cark-it	To die	Informal, another version of 'croaked it'; common in UK, Ireland, Australia & New Zealand	The guy was running, had a heart attack and carked it.
Cash in one's chips	To die	Informal, euphemistic	Redemption for cash of gambling counters at the end of a game
Catching the bus	To commit suicide	Slang	Originated from the Usenet newsgroup alt.suicide.holiday
Checking out	To die	Analogy (as from a hotel)	
Come to a sticky end	To die in a way that is considered unpleasant	Humorous	British. Also 'to meet a sticky end'.
Counting worms	Dead	Euphemistic	
Croak	To die	Slang	Death rattle
Crossed the Jordan	Died	Biblical/Revivalist	The deceased has entered the Promised Land (i.e. Heaven)
Curtains	Death	Theatrical	The final curtain at a dramatic performance
Dead as a dodo	Dead	Informal	The 'dodo', flightless bird from the island of Mauritius hunted to extinction
Dead as a doornail	Obviously dead	Informal	Charles Dickens used this phrase at the beginning of A Christmas Carol.
Death by misadventure	Avoidable death	Formal/legal	Death resulting from risk-taking
Deleted	Murdered	Literary	
Departed	To die	Neutral	
Destroyed	To die	Neutral	Usually refers to the humane killing of an animal
Die in a hole	To die	Slang	Usually used when annoyed at someone
Die with one's boots on	To die while able, or during activity, as opposed to in infirmity or while asleep.	Euphemistic	Old West usage: To die in a gunfight, as with the film They Died with Their Boots On. Also connotes dying in combat. British; cf. Iron Maiden's Die With Your Boots On.
Didn't make it	Killed in action (see below)	Euphemistic	
Done for	About to die	Neutral	
Drop dead	Die suddenly	Neutral	also slang aggressive dismissal
Dropping like flies	Dying in droves	Simile	also falling ill in numbers
Entered the homeland	1950s Grave England	Euphemistic	
Erased	Murdered	Literary	
Euthanasia	Assisted suicide	Formal	
Expire	Natural end	Neutral	
Exterminate	Kill	Directive	Exclaimed by Daleks (from Doctor Who) when ordered to kill
Fading away	To be weakening and close to death	Neutral	Also to be 'fading fast'
Fall off one's perch	To die	Informal	
Fall off the toilet	To die, often in an untimely or unexpected manner	Informal	
Food for worms	Someone who is dead	Humorous	Also 'worm food'
Free one's horses	To die	Neutral	
Game end	To kill	Informal	
Genocide	Intent to destroy, in whole or in part, a national, ethnic, racial or religious group	Formal	
Get smoked	To be killed	Slang	
Give up the ghost	To die	Informal	The soul leaving the body
Glue factory	To die	Neutral	Usually refers to the death of a horse
Going to Switzerland	Assisted suicide or euthanasia	Humorous, euphemistic	Likely but not explicitly referencing the Dignitas clinic located in the country, which has unique laws regarding the practice amongst foreigners (see suicide tourism)
Gone to a better place	To die	Euphemistic	Heaven
Go over the Big Ridge	To die	Unknown	
Go bung	To die	Informal	Australian. Also means 'to fail' or 'to go bankrupt'.
Go for a Burton	To die/break irreparably	Informal	British, from WWII.
Go to Davy Jones's locker	To drown or otherwise die at sea	Euphemistic	Peregrine Pickle describes Davy Jones as 'the fiend that presides over all the evil spirits of the deep'.
Go to the big [place] in the sky	To die and go to heaven	Informal	A place in the afterlife paralleling the deceased's life, such as "Big ranch in the sky".
Go home in a box	To be shipped to one's birthplace, dead	Slang, euphemistic	
Go out with one's boots on/with a bang/in style	To die while doing something enjoyed	Informal	
Go to, or head for, the last roundup	To die	Euphemistic	Associated with dying cowboys, along with "Going to that big ranch in the sky."
Go to one's reward	To die	Euphemistic	Final reckoning, just deserts after death
Go to one's watery grave	To die of drowning	Literary	
Go to a Texas cakewalk	To be hanged	Unknown	
Go the way of all flesh	To die	Neutral	
Go west	To be killed or lost	Informal	Refers to the sun setting at the west.
The Grim Reaper	Personification of death	Cultural	A skeleton with a scythe, often in a cloak. Also commonly truncated to just "The Reaper".
Hand in one's dinner pail	To die	Informal	No longer required at workmen's canteen
Happy hunting ground	Dead	Informal	Used to describe the afterlife according to Native Americans
Have one foot in the grave	To be close to death because of illness or age	Informal, sometimes humorous	
History	Dead	Informal	Usually interpreted as "to be history."
Hop on the last rattler	To die	Euphemistic	"Rattler" is a slang expression for a freight train.
Hop the twig	To die	Informal	Also 'to hop the stick'. Pagan belief that to jump a stick on the ground leads to the Afterworld.
In Abraham's bosom	In heaven	Neutral	From the Holy Bible, Luke 16:22.
It's clipped	To die/be killed	Slang	New York Slang for saying something is over.
Join the choir invisible	To die	Neutral	From an 1867 poem by George Eliot.
Join the great majority	To die	Euphemistic	First used by Edward Young, but the phrase 'the majority' is extremely old.
Justifiable homicide	Homicide	Formal	A deliberate homicide that is not a criminal act because the surrounding circumstances justified the use of deadly force. Defending oneself against a deadly attack, for example, or conducting a legally ordered execution.
Kermit (suicide)	To commit suicide, usually via falling from a great height	Humorous	Originated from a remixed video of Kermit the Frog from Sesame Street and a Kermit the Frog doll falling off a building.
Kick the bucket	To die	Informal	In suicidal hanging. Also 'kick off' (American).
Killed In Action (KIA)	Death of military personnel due to enemy action	Military language, official and informal use	
King of Terrors	Personification of death	Neutral	Of Biblical origin, found in Job 18:14 Also refers to death itself
(The) Late	Used to refer to the recently dead	Euphemism	
Lay waste	To kill	Slang	
Lights out	To die	Slang	Going into Eternal Oblivion
Liquidation	To be killed	Euphemism	Usually used in political context (such as purges), implies dehumanization.
Lose one's life	To die in an accident or violent event	Neutral	
Make the ultimate sacrifice	To die while fighting for a cause	Formal	Also 'make the supreme sacrifice'
Meet one's maker	To die	Euphemistic	According to Christian belief, soul meets God for final judgment
Not long for this world	Will die soon; have little time left to live	Old-fashioned	
No longer with us/Not with us anymore	Dead	Euphemistic	
Off on a boat	To die	Euphemistic	Viking
Off the hooks	Dead	Informal	British. Not to be confused with 'off the hook' (no longer in trouble).
On one's deathbed	Dying	Neutral	
On one's last legs	About to die	Informal	
On the wrong side of the grass	Dead	Euphemistic slang	Refers to the practice of burying the dead. Such individuals are below the grass as opposed to above it, hence being on the "wrong side".
One's hour has come	About to die	Literary	
One's number is up	One is going to die	Slang	
Oofed	To die	Humorous	Popularized from the video game Roblox; likely invented to circumvent in-game chat filters. When referring to suicide, one may "oof themselves".
Pass away	To die	Euphemism; polite	Also 'to pass on'
Pass in one's alley	To die	Informal	Australian
Pay the ultimate price	To die for a cause or principle	Neutral	Similar to "To make the ultimate sacrifice"
Peg out	To die	Slang	British. Also means 'to stop working'
Perish	Euphemism for death	Neutral	
Pop one's clogs	To die	Humorous, Informal	British. "Pop" is English slang for "pawn." A 19th-century working man might tell his family to take his clothes to the pawn shop to pay for his funeral, with his clogs among the most valuable items.
Promoted to Glory	Death of a Salvationist	Formal	Salvation Army terminology.
Punch one's ticket	To be killed	Euphemism	Ticket punching was a means of marking the end of one's shift, to refer to marking the end of one's life.
Pull the plug	To kill, or allow to die	Euphemism	Removal of life support, such as turning off the power, or "pull the plug" on a ventilator keeping someone alive.
Push up daisies	To have died and be buried under the ground	Humorous, Euphemistic	Early 20th century—also 'under the daisies', and 'turn one's toes up to the daisies', which date back to the mid-19th century. (See 'to turn up one's toes' below.)
Put down/put to sleep	To be euthanised	Euphemism	Euthanasia of an animal
Put one to the sword	To kill someone	Literary	
Rainbow Bridge	Dead	Euphemism	Usually referring to the death of a pet, e.g. "Crossing the Rainbow Bridge."
Reset character	To die	Euphemistic slang	Refers to video games where "resetting one's character" involves deliberately killing them and letting them respawn or load from a save.
Ride the pale horse	To die	Euphemistic	In the Biblical passage Revelation 6:8, a pale horse is ridden by Death, one of the Four Horsemen of the Apocalypse. The expression "behold a pale horse" has been used as the title of a 1964 film by Fred Zinnemann and a 1991 book by ufologist William Milton Cooper.
Run one through	To kill someone, usually by stabbing	Euphemism	
Send one to Eternity or to the Promised Land	To kill someone	Literary	
Send (or go) to the farm	To die	Euphemism	Usually referring to the death of a pet, especially if the owners are parents of young children e.g. "The dog was sent to a farm."
Sewerslide	Suicide	Slang	Algospeak; a slang term used on social media to avoid censorship of the word "suicide."
Shuffle off this mortal coil	To die	Humorous, Literary	From the To be, or not to be soliloquy from Shakespeare's Hamlet.
Six feet under	Dead	Informal	Six feet is the traditional depth of a grave
Sleeping with the fishes	Murdered, then disposed of in water.	Slang	Popularized by The Godfather
Slipped away	To die peacefully	Slang	Possibly originated from the poem "Death is Nothing at All" written by Reverend Henry Scott Holland in 1910 following the death of King Edward VII.
Step off	To die	Informal, euphemistic	Character Ron Birdwell in the movie The Late Show (1977): "I'm always sorry to hear any of God's creatures stepping off."
Struck down	To be killed by an illness	Neutral	Usually passive
Swim with concrete shoes	Gangster murder	Slang	
Take a dirt nap	To die and be buried	Slang	
Take a last bow	To die	Slang	
Take one's own life	To commit suicide	Euphemism	
Take/took the easy way out	To commit suicide	Euphemism	Based on the original meaning of the phrase of taking the path of least resistance.
Take the last train to glory	To die	Euphemism	An idiom Christian in origin.
Tango Uniform	Dead, irreversibly broken	Military slang	This is "T.U." in the NATO phonetic alphabet, an abbreviation for Tits Up (which is itself a euphemism for an airplane crash).
Terminate; especially, terminate with extreme prejudice	To kill; especially when carrying out an assassination as part of a covert operation.	Euphemism; military slang	Originated during the Vietnam War; later popularized by the films Apocalypse Now and The Terminator
The Big Adios	To die	Euphemistic slang	Ex: "Live life to the fullest before the big Adios!"
To join the whisperers	To die	Euphemism	From the television series Lost: the Whispers were voices of those who died, yet were unable to move on and therefore remained on the island as whispers
Turn up one's toes	To die	Slang	An alternative of 'turn one's toes up to the daisies' (see 'push up daisies' above.)
Unalive (also un-alive)	To die, or to kill	Euphemistic slang	Algospeak; A euphemism that developed in slang on social media, particularly TikTok, to avoid censorship of the words "kill" and "die."
Unsubscribe from life	To die	Euphemistic	21st century slang
Waste	To kill	Slang	
Wearing a pine overcoat (i.e. a wooden coffin)	Dead	Slang	Idiom used by American gangsters of the early 20th century.
Worm food or worm bait	Dead	Slang	

== See also ==
- The "Dead Parrot sketch" contains several euphemisms for death ("is no more", "has ceased to be", "bereft of life, it rests in peace", and "this is an ex-parrot")
- Wikisaurus:die
- Wikisaurus:death
- List of death deities
- List of Russian-language euphemisms for dying
