= Euthanasia in Switzerland =

Active euthanasia is illegal in Switzerland (administration by a third-party), but supplying the means for dying is legal (assisted suicide), as long as the action which directly causes death is performed by the one wishing to die. Assisted suicide in the country has been legal since 1941, and Switzerland was the first country in the world to permit any kind of assisted dying. In 2014, a total of 752 assisted suicides were performed (330 men, 422 women), compared to 1,029 non-assisted suicides (754 men, 275 women); most of the assisted suicides concerned elderly people suffering from a terminal disease. In what critics have termed suicide tourism, Swiss euthanasia organisations have been widely used by foreigners. As of 2008, German citizens were 60 percent of the total number of suicides assisted by the organisation Dignitas.

== Legal situation ==
The Swiss Criminal Code of 1937 outlaws "incitement or assistance to suicide from selfish motives" (Art. 115). Any active role in voluntary euthanasia ("manslaughter on request") is also outlawed, even if done with "respectable motives" such as mercy killings (Art. 114). However, by omission, assisted suicide from non-selfish motives remains legal. For example, lethal drugs may be prescribed as long as the recipient takes an active role in the drug administration, but active euthanasia (such as the act of administering a lethal injection) is not legal.

All forms of active euthanasia, such as administering lethal injection, remain prohibited in Switzerland. Swiss law only allows providing means to die by suicide and the reasons for doing so must not be based on self-interest (such as monetary gain). Nonprofit organisations administering life-ending medicine were first established in Switzerland in the 1980s.

Article 115 of the Swiss Criminal Code reads:

Inciting and assisting suicide: Any person who for selfish motives incites or assists another to commit or attempt to commit suicide shall, if that other person thereafter commits or attempts to commit suicide, be liable to a custodial sentence not exceeding five years or to a monetary penalty.

This regulation of assisted suicide also permits the assistance of voluntary euthanasia for non-resident foreigners, which has led to the phenomenon of "suicide tourism".

When an assisted suicide is declared, a police inquiry may be started. Since no crime has been committed in the absence of a selfish motive, these are mostly open and shut cases. Prosecution can occur if doubts are raised about the patient's competence to make an autonomous choice, or about the motivation of anyone involved in assisting the suicide.

While there is no regulation on permissible reasons for the suicide, the major Swiss nonprofit organisations dedicated to assisted suicide may require that a terminal illness has been diagnosed.

=== Death investigation and costs ===
In Switzerland, every assisted suicide triggers a mandatory investigation due to its classification as a non-natural death. This legal requirement, enshrined in the Swiss Criminal Procedure Code, imposes significant financial burdens on cantons, particularly with the increasing number of foreign nationals seeking assisted suicide. These investigations typically involve medical examinations and legal inquiries, leading to substantial costs. Cantons have explored various strategies to manage these expenses, but the obligation to investigate remains a core principle.

The canton of Solothurn, for instance, has implemented a cost-saving agreement with Pegasos, an assisted suicide organization. By requiring video evidence of self-administration and supplementary information, Solothurn reduces the need for extensive on-site investigations, transferring the body for a more cost-effective forensic examination covered by the organization. Additionally, the burden of such costs are held by Pegasos, which passes it back to those seeking assisted suicide, reducing costs to the state. This model highlights the ongoing tension between legal requirements and the practical challenges of managing assisted suicide procedures. While other cantons grapple with similar cost pressures, the Solothurn initiative is distinctive in its cost-sharing arrangement. The broader discussion continues regarding the classification of assisted suicide and the necessity of current investigative protocols, with organizations advocating for a more streamlined, less financially burdensome approach.

== Debate and notable cases ==
In November 2006, the Federal Supreme Court of Switzerland rejected a complaint against the canton of Zurich‘s health department, which was filed on behalf of a man who suffered from bipolar disorder and desired to be issued pentobarbital by the state in order to end his life. The court advanced that no case can be made that the state has any obligation to facilitate the availability of substances used for euthanasia, as had been argued by the plaintiff based on both the Swiss Federal Constitution and on article 8 of the ECHR. However, it also affirmed a right for those suffering from “incurable, permanent, severe psychological disorders" to end their lives.

In a 2007 essay in the Hastings Center Report referencing the Swiss case, bioethicist Jacob M. Appel advocated adopting similar rules in the United States.

In July 2009, British conductor Sir Edward Downes and his wife Joan died together at a suicide clinic outside Zürich "under circumstances of their own choosing." Sir Edward was not terminally ill, but his wife was diagnosed with rapidly developing cancer.

In a referendum on 15 May 2011, voters in the canton of Zurich overwhelmingly rejected calls to ban assisted suicide or to outlaw the practice for non-residents. Out of more than 278,000 ballots cast, the initiative to ban assisted suicide was rejected by 85 percent of voters and the initiative to outlaw it for foreigners was turned down by 78 percent.

In May 2022, the Swiss Medical Association issued guidelines tightening assisted suicide regulations.

In September 2022, French-Swiss film director, screenwriter and film critic Jean-Luc Godard died at his home in Rolle, following an assisted suicide procedure.

== See also ==
- Suicide in Switzerland
- Right to Die?
