= Ludwig Minelli =

Swiss lawyer and journalist (1932–2025)

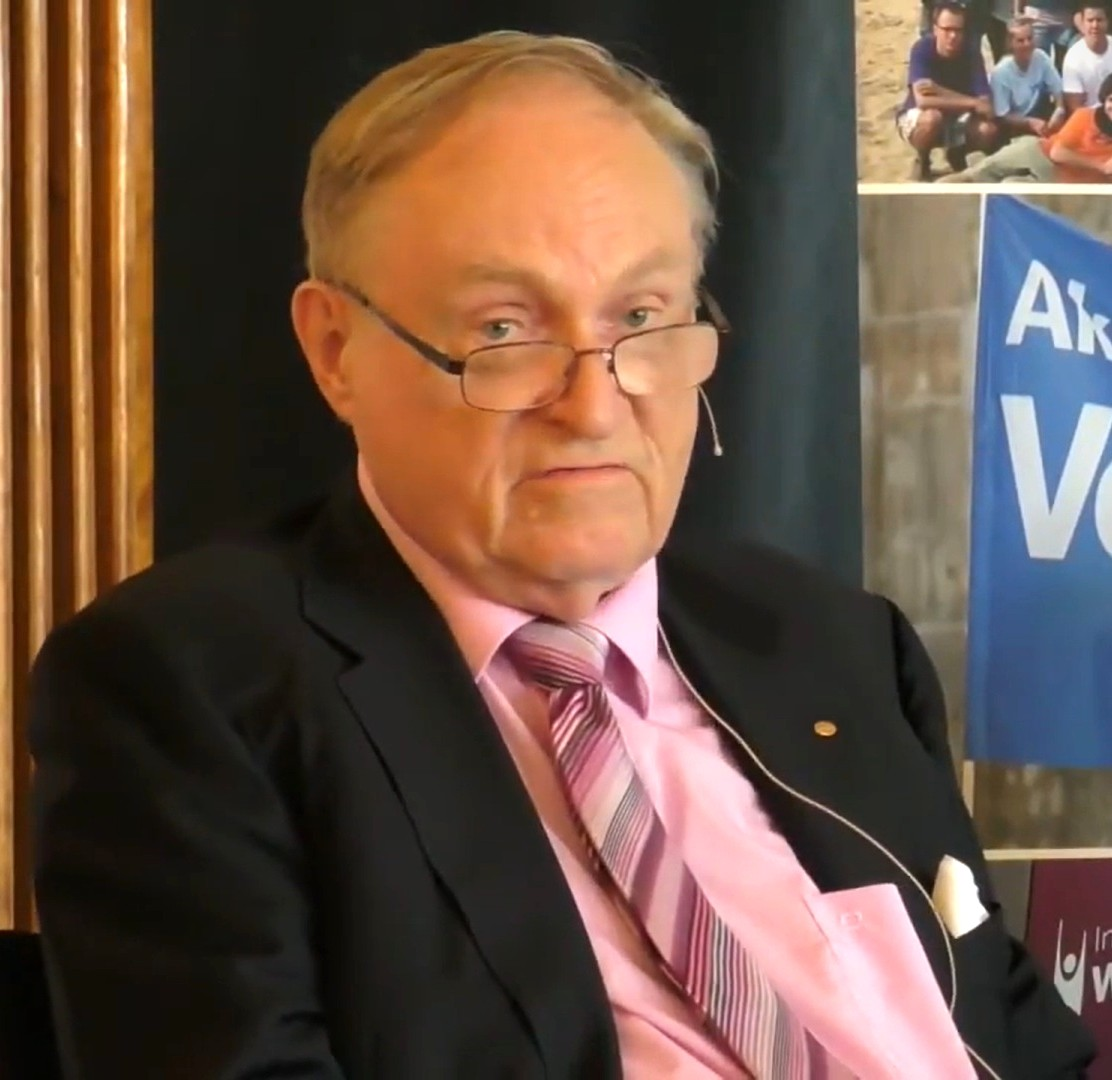
- Minelli in 2015
- Born: Ludwig Amadeus Minelli; 5 December 1932; Zurich, Switzerland
- Died: 29 November 2025 (aged 92); Forch, Maur, Zurich, Switzerland
- Education: University of Zurich
- Occupation: Human rights lawyer
- Years active: 1981–2025
- Known for: Founder and general secretary of Dignitas

Ludwig Amadeus Minelli (5 December 1932 – 29 November 2025) was a Swiss human rights lawyer and former journalist who founded Dignitas, a Swiss assisted-suicide organisation.

Originally in a legal advisory role with the Zurich branch of Exit, Minelli formed Dignitas due to his frustrations with its structure. He was a target of prolonged criticism and insults as head of Dignitas, being labelled "Dr Death" (Note: German: "Dr. Tod") by newspapers and being accused of financially exploiting patients. Dignitas was known for offering assisted suicide to non-Swiss citizens whose countries prohibit the practice.

Minelli supported physician-assisted suicide and believed that it should be available to both healthy and sick individuals. He influenced other areas of Swiss jurisprudence through appeals to the Federal Supreme Court and the European Court of Human Rights, which include a 1983 ruling that found that there were limited circumstances in which innocent parties are responsible for court costs.

== Life and career ==
=== Early life ===
Ludwig Amadeus Minelli was born in Zurich on 5 December 1932, the eldest of four children born to a house painter and decorator. Minelli grew up in Küsnacht, in the canton of Zurich. He recalled developing a sense for "justice" in 1944, when a substitute teacher in his primary school class hit a younger pupil: "during the next break, I complained to a neighbouring farmer who I knew was on the school board". (Note: German: «Es war noch Krieg, und unser Lehrer musste in den Militärdienst. Der Verweser, der ihn vertrat, schlug eines Tages einem Viertklässler mit einem Lineal über den Handrücken. Da beschwerte ich mich in der nächsten Pause bei einem benachbarten Landwirt, von dem ich wusste, dass er in der Schulpflege sass.») As a child, he wanted to become a priest and later in university, he ruminated on an acting career before settling on journalism and completing his diploma.

=== Journalism and legal career ===
Minelli worked at his father's painting business, an accounting firm and then the Swiss Treasury Company, before he started his career as a journalist at Die Tat. He worked as a journalist for around 15 years, including a stint as the first Swiss correspondent at the German news magazine Der Spiegel in 1964, after freelancing for some years.

An "electrifying moment" came when Minelli reported on the ratification of the European Convention on Human Rights (ECHR) and realized that he would want his life's work to focus on the right to die. Another influential event was the protracted death of his grandmother from kidney failure earlier in his time at Der Spiegel. He began law school in 1977, shortly after the ECHR was ratified, and he began practicing human rights law four years later. According to the newspaper WOZ, he influenced other areas of Swiss jurisprudence, such as his cases to the Federal Supreme Court and the European Court of Human Rights, including a 1983 ruling that found that there were limited circumstances in which innocent parties are responsible for court costs.

Minelli was also the founder and general secretary of the Swiss Society for the European Convention on Human Rights.

=== Assisted-dying advocacy ===
Minelli joined the Zurich branch of Exit, an assisted-dying organization as the legal advisor in 1992. Swiss law does not prohibit assisted suicide unless motivated by "selfish reasons". Eventually becoming disillusioned with the organization, he formed Dignitas with two former colleagues briefly after resigning from his position at a board of directors meeting in May 1998. He had facilitated the suicide of 6 Swiss nationals by the end of that year. Dignitas eventually received international attention for offering assisted suicide to non-Swiss citizens whose countries prohibit the practice. Minelli said in an interview in March 2008 that Dignitas had assisted 840 people to die, 60% of them Germans.

Dignitas proved controversial, and Minelli as head of the organization was a frequent target of criticism and insults, including from prosecutors and church and media figures. Dignitas's services to foreigners were characterized as "death tourism", Minelli was personally accused of exploiting patients for profit, while newspapers labelled him as "Dr Death" (German: "Dr. Tod"). Though he was primarily known for his advocacy for assisted dying, he pushed back against the qualification as "too imprecise".

In a 2010 interview with The Atlantic magazine, Minelli admitted to depositing cremation urns containing the ashes of Dignitas members at Lake Zurich. A 2018 court case against Minelli focused on the circumstances surrounding the death of a woman who had bequeathed Dignitas 100,000 Swiss francs in her will. The organisation had found the woman a fourth doctor who prescribed the medication for assisted suicide after three doctors previously declined her request and the case accused him of profiteering from his clients.

== Personal life and death ==
Minelli was an atheist. His daughter is author and filmmaker Michèle Minelli.

In 2010, Minelli was reported to have become a millionaire. He said that the wealth had come from his mother's inheritance.

Minelli died by assisted suicide on 29 November 2025 at his home in Forch, in the municipality of Maur, aged 92. In the previous year, he affirmed his willingness to die by assisted suicide and had said that he had planned to hold a celebration at which his close friends and family, including his children and grandchildren, would be present when he died.

== Selected works ==
- Minelli, Ludwig (2008). Robertson-von Trotha, Caroline Y. (ed.). "Tod und Sterben in der Gegenwartsgesellschaft. Eine interdisziplinäre Auseinandersetzung". Interdisciplinary Studies on Culture and Society (in German). 3. Baden-Baden.

== See also ==
- Euthanasia in Switzerland
