= Pegasos =

Pegasos may refer to:

- Pegasus, a winged horse in Greek mythology
- Genesi Pegasos, a brand of computer systems produced by Genesi
- Pegasos Swiss Association, a nonprofit group supporting assisted suicide

== See also ==
- Pegasus (disambiguation)
