= Terry Pratchett: Choosing to Die =

2011 television documentary

- Directed by: Charlie Russell
- Theme music composer: Tim Goalen
- Country of origin: United Kingdom
- Original language: English

Production
- Producer: Charlie Russell
- Running time: 59 minutes
- Production company: KEO North

Original release
- Release: 13 June 2011

Terry Pratchett: Choosing to Die is a 2011 one-off television documentary produced by KEO North for BBC Scotland on the subject of assisted death, directed and produced by Charlie Russell. It is presented by Terry Pratchett and features Peter Smedley, a 71-year-old motor neuron disease sufferer, dying by assisted death at the Swiss assisted dying organisation, Dignitas.

== Subject ==
The film focuses on the story of Peter Smedley, an English millionaire hotelier who was diagnosed with motor neurone disease in 2008. At the beginning of the film, Pratchett meets with the Smedleys to talk about dying; then he visits the widow of a Belgian writer Hugo Claus who decided to end his life in 2008 after developing Alzheimer's disease.

Pratchett talks to Mick Gordelier, a retired London taxi driver with motor neurone disease who has no desire to commit suicide, preferring to be cared for in a hospice. After that, the novelist visits Andrew Colgan, a 42-year-old multiple sclerosis sufferer; Colgan, like Peter Smedley, decided to go to Dignitas to take his life. Pratchett then travels to Switzerland to accompany the Smedleys and meets with Ludwig Minelli, the founder of Dignitas; during the final scene of the film, he witnesses the death of Smedley who takes a lethal dose of the barbiturate Nembutal, being kept company by his wife Christine and two Dignitas staff.

== Production ==
The film was shot in several locations around the United Kingdom, including Terry Pratchett's manor house near Salisbury, Wiltshire. The interview with the Smedleys was filmed at their mansion in Saint Peter Port, Guernsey with the Swiss part being shot in Zurich; the final scene took place on 10 December 2010 in Blue Oasis, Dignitas's two-storey house located in an industrial estate east of the city.

The executive producers of the film were Sam Anthony for the BBC and Craig Hunter for KEO North; Charlotte Moore took the role of the commissioning editor.

== Broadcast ==
A preview of the film was shown at the 2011 Sheffield Doc/Fest on 11 June. Its première was screened as a part of Panorama documentary programme on BBC Two television channel on 13 June, attaining 1.6 million viewers (6.7% of the total British audience); a following Newsnight debate on the film which represented both supporters and opponents of assisted death drew 1.1 million (5.6%).

The film is believed to be the first on-screen death by assisted death aired on terrestrial television; previously, in December 2008, the satellite television channel Sky Real Lives had shown the assisted death of a retired university professor Craig Ewert, who suffered from motor neurone disease, performed at the same Dignitas clinic.

An official North American première of the film was held during the North American Discworld Convention 2011 taking place from 8–11 July in Madison, Wisconsin.

== Reception ==
The film sparked strong controversy even before its première, with the BBC receiving about 750 complaints before the broadcast on 13 June and several others after the airing; on the following day, the total number of complaints reached 1,219 with 301 calls in favour of the film. It has been criticised by Christian and pro-life organisations, including the Care Not Killing Alliance, whose spokeswoman, Alistair Thompson, described it as a "pro assisted-suicide propaganda loosely dressed up as a documentary"; its campaign director Peter Saunders stated that the film is a "disgraceful use of licence-payers' money and further evidence of a blatant campaigning stance". Michael Nazir-Ali, a former bishop of the Church of England, added that it "glorified suicide and indeed assisted suicide".

In July 2011, an Early Day Motion calling on the BBC to remain impartial on the subject of assisted dying was supported by 15 members of the House of Commons.

Sarah Wootton, chief executive of Dignity in Dying defended the film saying it was "deeply moving and at times difficult to watch" and that it "did not seek to hide the realities of assisted dying". A spokeswoman of the BBC denied the accusations of bias saying that the film "is giving people the chance to make their own minds up on the issue"; Craig Hunter, the film's executive producer for KEO North, called it a "valuable contribution to the increasingly urgent debate as to who determines when and how we die."

Terry Pratchett, who was a presenter on the film, disclosed his reason for making it, stating that he was "appalled at the current situation" and that "he knows that assisted dying is practised in at least three places in Europe and also in the United States." He defended the right to decide on assisted death, saying that he believes "it should be possible for someone stricken with a serious and ultimately fatal illness to choose to die peacefully with medical help, rather than suffer."

On 13 November 2011, 5 months after its première, the film received the 2011 BAFTA Scotland Single Documentary award for the best Scottish documentary film produced in 2011. On 21 March 2012, it also received the 2011 Royal Television Society Programme Awards in a category for single documentaries, being described by the judges as "groundbreaking, revelatory and profoundly moving." On 27 May 2012, the programme received the Single Documentary prize in the 2012 Arqiva British Academy Television Awards. On 20 November 2012, it received the Best Documentary prize in the 40th International Emmy Awards.
