= Assisted suicide =

Suicide undertaken with aid from another person

Overview of where assisted suicide is legal in at least some circumstances: Assisted suicide is legal. (Note: Portugal: Law not yet in force, awaits regulation to be implemented. The law legalizing physician-assisted suicide and euthanasia, Law n.º 22/2023, of 22 May, states in Article 31 that the regulation must be approved within 90 days of the publishing of the law, which would have been 23 August 2023. However, the regulation has not yet been approved by the government. On 24 November 2023, the Ministry of Health stated that the regulation of the law would be the responsibility of the new government elected in the 10 March 2024 elections. The law, according to its Article 34, will only enter into force 30 days after the regulation is published. As of 1 May 2026, the regulation has not yet been drafted and approved. Jersey: Law not yet in force, awaits regulation to be implemented. Isle of Man: Law not yet in force, awaits regulation to be implemented.) Legalized by court ruling, but not legislated or regulated. (Note: Several regions of Italy have regulated or are in the process of regulating assisted suicide. The Belgium's Federal Commission for the Control and Evaluation of Euthanasia interprets that assisted suicide is permitted in Belgium under the euthanasia law. However the law only mentions euthanasia.) Assisted suicide is illegal.

Assisted suicide is the process by which a person, with the assistance of a medical professional, takes actions to end their life.

This practice is strictly regulated by the laws and rules of the state or country that a person lives in. The physician's assistance is usually limited to writing a prescription for a lethal dose of drugs. This practice falls under the concept of the medical right to die (i.e., the right of a person to choose when and how they will die, either through medical aid in dying or refusing life-saving medical treatment).

While assisted suicide is not legal in all countries, it is legal under certain circumstances in some countries including Australia, Austria, Belgium, Canada, Germany, Isle of Man, Jersey, Luxembourg, the Netherlands, Portugal, Spain, Switzerland, and parts of the United States. The constitutional courts of Colombia, Estonia and Italy have legalized assisted suicide, but their legislatures have not yet legislated or regulated the practice. However, in Italy, several of its regions have regulated or are in the process of regulating this practice.

== Terminology ==
Depending on the territory and the legislation, this practice is referred to using a variety of terminologies. In some specific legal frameworks, these terms refer exclusively to assisted suicide, although the same terms are used in other jurisdictions to refer to other related practices, such as voluntary euthanasia. These include:

- medical aid in dying (MAID)
- medical assistance in dying (MAiD)
- physician-assisted death (PAD)
- physician-assisted suicide (PAS)
- assisted dying (AD)
- assisted suicide (AS)

However, all of these terminologies in their legal framework refer to the same medical practice, in which a physician indirectly assists another person to end their own life. It involves a physician "knowingly and intentionally providing a person with the knowledge or means or both required to [end one's life], including counseling about lethal doses of drugs, prescribing such lethal doses or supplying the drugs". This is a regulated practice in which the patient must meet strict criteria in order to receive medical assistance in dying.

=== Related terms ===
Assisted suicide should not be confused with the practice of euthanasia, which occurs when somebody directly takes actions to end the life of another (either a person or animal). It can occur with or without consent, and can be classified as voluntary (the person consents), non-voluntary (the person is unable to provide consent) or involuntary (the person does not give consent).

Assisted suicide on the other hand, includes only the indirect involvement of a medical professional, as the dying individual is responsible for completing the action that ends their own life.

=== Concerns about use of the term "assisted suicide" ===
Some advocates for assisted dying strongly oppose the terms "assisted suicide" and "suicide", and prefer terms such as "medical aid in dying" or "assisted dying". The motivation for this is to distance the debate from suicides commonly performed by those not terminally ill, as they believe that the use of "suicide" is not an accurate representation of the medical practice.

In 2022, the World Federation of Right to Die Societies adopted the term "assisted dying" as the preferred terminology.

== Restrictions and criteria ==
To qualify for medical aid in dying, individuals must typically meet strict criteria, which may include:

- they have a terminal (i.e. likely to die in 6 months or a year) or incurable illness or disability,
- they are of sound mind,
- they voluntarily and repeatedly express their wish to die,
- they take the specified, lethal dose by their own hand.

Laws vary in scope from place to place. In the United States, medical aid in dying is limited to those who have a prognosis of less than six months to live. Additionally, it is required in the United States that a physician offer alternative methods to limit a patient's suffering or discomfort, such as hospice or palliative care, before allowing them to agree to medical aid in dying.

In Canada and most European countries where the practice is permitted, eligibility also includes 'unbearable suffering' (i.e. the person does not need to be terminally ill). Switzerland has some of the least restrictive criteria for medical aid in dying. In order to qualify, a medical diagnosis is not required. Any person of sound mind can seek assistance to commit suicide. The Federal Supreme Court affirmed in 2023 that in case of mental illness, several intensive discussions with the individual, questioning the patient's relatives and obtaining a medical second opinion is sufficient for a doctor to prescribe a lethal drug to a mentally ill person. An opinion written by a psychiatric specialist is not necessary. The Swiss association Dignitas requires that the person:

- have a disease which will lead to death (terminal illness), and/or an unendurable incapacitating disability, and/or unbearable and uncontrollable pain,
- be of sound judgement,
- be able to commit the last stage – to swallow, administer the gastric tube or open the valve of the intravenous access tube – by themselves.

== Methods ==
=== Ingestion method ===
In the majority of cases, medical aid in dying is performed through the ingestion of pills that are swallowed (either whole or in powdered form), with the patient becoming unconscious after approximately 20-30 minutes and then dying within about 1-2 hours. On average, the median time to death is approximately 45 minutes.

=== Intravenous method ===
In some places such as Canada, the medications may be taken by intravenous infusion, with dying normally occurring within a few minutes.

=== Inhalation method ===
Ingestion of nitrogenous gas has been used in a few cases in Switzerland.

=== Medications commonly used ===
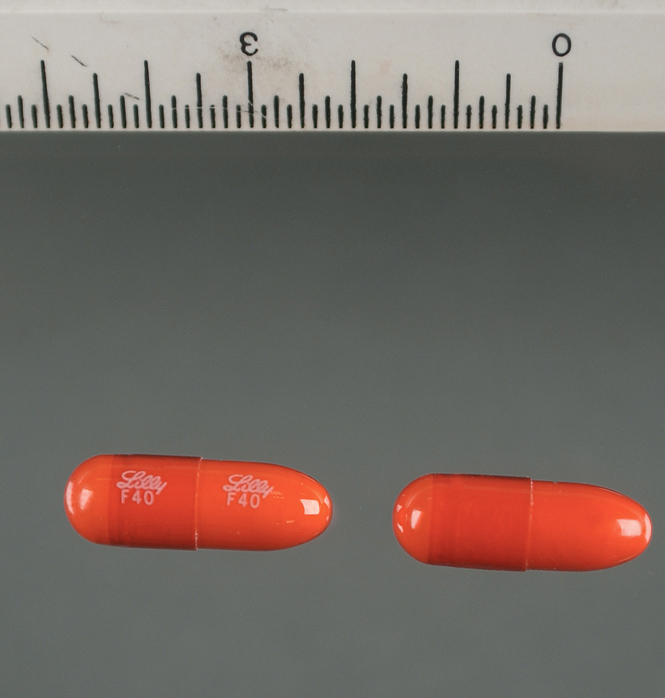
Secobarbital, previously was one of the most commonly prescribed drugs for physician-assisted suicide in the United States. As of 2025, the medication is now rarely used.

Some common medications include Propofol, Midazolam, Diazepam, Digoxin, Rocuronium or various barbiturates, particularly secobarbital (brand name Seconal) and pentobarbital.

Medications are typically given in combinations, such as:

- DDMAPh: diazepam, digoxin, morphine sulfate, amitriptyline, and phenobarbital
- DDHAPh: diazepam, digoxin, hydromorphone, amitriptyline, and phenobarbital
- DDMA: diazepam, digoxin, morphine sulfate, and amitriptyline
- DDMP: diazepam, digoxin, morphine sulfate, and propranolol

Other medications and medication combinations have been considered, and typically vary by state or country.

In Canada, a sequence of midazolam, propofol and rocuronium is commonly used.

In Oregon, USA, almost all medical aid in dying ingestions were of combination medications. In 2025, 75% of ingestions used the drug combination DDMAPh (diazepam, digoxin, morphine sulfate, amitriptyline, phenobarbital), 13% of ingestions were DDHAPh (replacing the morphine sulfate with hydromorphone), and 12% of ingestions were of DDMA (diazepam, digoxin, morphine sulfate, and amitriptyline). Other US states also use similar drug combinations to facilitate medical aid in dying.

In the Netherlands, very high-dose barbiturates have been recommended by the Netherlands' Guidelines for the Practice of Euthanasia.

In Switzerland, in the Dignitas program, after taking an anti-emetic, the person ingests sodium pentobarbital (NaP, a.k.a. Nembutal), usually 15 grams. This is normally swallowed with water, but may be ingested by gastric tube or intravenously. In the Swiss Pegasos program, sodium pentobarbital is taken intravenously.

=== Effectiveness ===
The methods that are now widely used have very high success rates, but not 100%. In Oregon, USA, between the years 2001 - 2025, only 9 out of 3,621 cases (0.2%) were ineffective (recipient regained consciousness after ingesting the medication).

== Witnessing the act ==
=== Medical staff ===
In most countries, medical staff such as doctors or nurses are permitted to accompany the patient and serve as a witness, so long as the patient is the only person who handles and ingests the medication on their own.

=== Other witnesses ===
Other witnesses are also typically allowed, such as friends, family, or community volunteers.

In Oregon in 2025, it was found that a medical staff or volunteer were present in 79% of cases when medications were ingested, and in 56% of cases at time of death.

== Duo-euthanasia ==
Some countries, such as the Netherlands, allow duo-euthanasia, in which partners die together. In 2023, 66 people (33 couples) chose to die by duo-euthanasia. Former Dutch prime minister Dries van Agt and his wife died this way.

== Legality by country and region ==
Status of assisted suicide around the world: Physician-assisted suicide is legal. Legalized by court ruling, but not legislated or regulated Physician-assisted suicide is illegal.

Rates of euthanasia and assisted suicide (EAS) have increased substantially in developed countries, with wide variance in the rates of increase.

=== Australia ===
Laws regarding assisted suicide in Australia are a matter for state and territory governments. Physician assisted suicide is currently legal in all Australian states and territories: New South Wales, Victoria, South Australia, Western Australia, Tasmania, Queensland, Australian Capital Territory, and the Northern Territory.

Under Victorian law, patients can ask medical practitioners about assisted suicide, and doctors, including conscientious objectors, should refer to appropriately trained colleagues who do not conscientiously object. Health practitioners are restricted from initiating conversation or suggesting VAD to a patient unprompted.

Physician assisted suicide was legal in the Northern Territory for a short time under the Rights of the Terminally Ill Act 1995, until this law was overturned by the Federal Parliament which also removed the ability for territories to pass legislation relating to assisted dying, however this prohibition was repealed in December 2022 with the passing of Restoring Territory Rights Act 2022. The highly controversial 'Euthanasia Machine', the first invented voluntary assisted dying machine of its kind, created by Philip Nitschke, utilised during this period is presently held at London's Science Museum.

=== Austria ===
Current status of assisted suicide in Europe: Assisted suicide is legal. Legalized by court ruling, but not legislated or regulated Assisted suicide is not legal.

In December 2020, the Austrian Constitutional Court ruled that the prohibition of assisted suicide was unconstitutional. In December 2021, the Austrian Parliament legalized assisted suicide for those who are terminally ill or have a permanent, debilitating condition.

=== Belgium ===
The Euthanasia Act legalized voluntary euthanasia in Belgium in 2002, but it did not cover physician-assisted suicide. The Federal Evaluation and Control Commission (Dutch: Federale Evaluatie-en Controle Commissie) the institution that is responsible for checking whether the law has been followed in practice, concluded that physician-assisted suicide is allowed under the same conditions as in the case of euthanasia. The physician needs to be present and is responsible. The professional group representing the doctors shares this stance.

=== Canada ===
In Canada, physician-assisted suicide was first legalized in the province of Quebec on 5 June 2014. It was declared nationally legal by the Supreme Court of Canada on 6 February 2015, in Carter v. Canada (Attorney General).

Federal legislation formalizing physician-assisted suicide passed in mid-June 2016, for patients facing an estimated death within six months. As of March 2021, individuals no longer need to be terminally ill in order to qualify for euthanasia. Legislation allowing for assisted suicide for mental illness was expected to come into force on 17 March 2023, but was permanently scrapped by the Carney ministry in October 2026.

=== China ===
In China, assisted suicide is illegal under Articles 232 and 233 of the Criminal Law of the People's Republic of China. In China, suicide or neglect is considered homicide and can be punished by three to seven years in prison.

In May 2011, Zhong Yichun, a farmer, was sentenced to two years imprisonment by the People's Court of Longnan County, in China's Jiangxi Province for assisting Zeng Qianxiang to die by suicide. Zeng had a mental illness and repeatedly asked Zhong to help him die by suicide. In October 2010, Zeng took excessive sleeping pills and lay in a cave. As planned, Zhong called him 15 minutes later to confirm that he was dead and buried him. However, according to the autopsy report, the cause of death was from suffocation, not an overdose. Zhong was convicted of criminal negligence. In August 2011, Zhong appealed the court sentence, but it was rejected.

In 1992, a physician was accused of murdering a patient with advanced cancer by lethal injection. He was eventually acquitted.

=== Colombia ===
In May 1997 the Colombian Constitutional Court allowed for the voluntary euthanasia of sick patients who requested to end their lives, by passing Article 326 of the 1980 Penal Code. This ruling owes its success to the efforts of a group that strongly opposed voluntary euthanasia. When one of its members brought a lawsuit to the Colombian Supreme Court against it, the court issued a 6 to 3 decision that "spelled out the rights of a terminally ill person to engage in voluntary euthanasia".

=== Denmark ===
Assisted suicide is illegal in Denmark. Passive euthanasia, or the refusal to accept treatment, is not illegal. A survey from 2014 found that 71% of Denmark's population was in favor of legalizing voluntary euthanasia and physician-assisted suicide.

=== France ===
The legalisation of assisted suicide was a campaign promise of President Emmanuel Macron during the 2022 presidential election. A law legalising assisted suicide was passed by the French Parliament on 15 July 2026. Following a request by Prime Minister Sébastien Lecornu, the law is pending examination by the Constitutional Council. The law is targeted at people with late-stage uncurable diseases experiencing significant physical suffering that inhibits treatment. In cases where patients are unable to inject euthanasia drugs themselves, a medical worker can administer it instead. The law is expected to come into force no sooner than early 2027, until which the practice remains illegal.

The controversy over legalising voluntary euthanasia and physician-assisted suicide is not as big as in the United States because of the country's "well developed hospice care programme". However, in 2000 the controversy over the topic was ignited with Vincent Humbert. After a car crash that left him "unable to 'walk, see, speak, smell or taste'", he used the movement of his right thumb to write a book, I Ask the Right to Die (Je vous demande le droit de mourir), in which he voiced his desire to "die legally". After his appeal was denied, his mother assisted in killing him by injecting him with an overdose of barbiturates that put him into a coma, killing him two days later. Though his mother was arrested for aiding in her son's death and later acquitted, the case did jump-start new legislation which states that when medicine serves "no other purpose than the artificial support of life" it can be "suspended or not undertaken".

=== Germany ===
Killing somebody in accordance with their demands is always illegal under the German criminal code (Paragraph 216, "Killing at the request of the victim").

That said, assisting suicide is now generally legal as the Federal Constitutional Court has ruled in 2020 that it is generally protected under the Basic Law. This milestone decision overturned a ban on the commercialization of assisted suicide and set out an entirely new course for countries or jurisdictions contemplating such a provision. Since suicide itself is legal, assistance or encouragement is not punishable by the usual legal mechanisms dealing with complicity and incitement (German criminal law follows the idea of "accessories of complicity" which states that "the motives of a person who incites another person to commit suicide, or who assists in its commission, are irrelevant"). Whereas the traditional approach for establishing an assisted dying service has always been based on identifying criteria for who was eligible for it predicated on a view regarding a person's acceptable quality of life (e.g. condition of health or illness), the ruling by the German court stated that government in pluralist societies can not do so as it would violate one's autonomy, the principle of person-state separation. That suggests an alternative model for an assisted dying regime similar to that in Switzerland where no government legislated regime was created but where the provision has existed for decades.

==== Travel to Switzerland ====
Between 1998 and 2018 around 1,250 German citizens (almost three times the number of any other nationality) travelled to Dignitas in Zurich, Switzerland, for an assisted suicide, where this has been legal since 1998. Switzerland is one of the few countries that permit assisted suicide for non-resident foreigners.

==== Physician-assisted suicide ====
Physician-assisted suicide was formally legalised on 26 February 2020 when Germany's top court removed the prohibition of "professionally assisted suicide".

=== Iceland ===
Assisted suicide is illegal. However, members of the Icelandic reform party have backed its first euthanasia bill.

=== Ireland ===
Assisted suicide is illegal. "Both euthanasia and assisted suicide are illegal under Irish law. Depending on the circumstances, euthanasia is regarded as either manslaughter or murder and is punishable by up to life imprisonment."

=== Italy ===
In Italy, assisted suicide has been conditionally allowed since 2019 under specific circumstances following the Italian Constitutional Court ruling 242/2019.

While active euthanasia remains illegal, assisted suicide is permitted if the following conditions are met:

- The patient suffers from an irreversible condition.
- The patient experiences physical or psychological suffering that they deem unbearable.
- The patient is dependent on life-sustaining treatments.
- The patient is fully capable of making free and informed decisions.

The aforementioned conditions, as well as the methods of assistance for a freely and autonomously requested assisted suicide, must be verified by a public healthcare structure with prior approval from the relevant ethics committee.

In 2024 the Court upheld its previous ruling and clarified that:

- life-sustaining treatments are not limited to those administered by medical staff but can also include those provided by family members or caregivers
- the ruling also applies to patients who require life-sustaining treatments but have chosen to refuse them.

As of October 2026, the Italian Parliament has not yet legislated on the regulation of assisted suicide, while the regional councils of Emilia-Romagna, Sardinia, Tuscany, Umbria, and Veneto have passed regional laws outlining organisational procedures for implementing Constitutional Court rulings, and the Regional Council of Apulia has taken administrative action through a regional resolution. The remaining 14 Italian regions still need to intervene in establishing procedures and timelines.

On 16 June 2022, the first assisted suicide was performed. As of 25 March 2026, 14 people have received assisted suicide in Italy. As of November 2026, five Italian regions have regulated assisted suicide.

=== Japan ===
Japan’s Penal Code Article 202 criminalizes assisted suicide, solicitation of suicide, and consensual homicide with penalties of six months to seven years imprisonment.

=== Jersey ===
On 25 November 2021, the States Assembly of Jersey voted to legalise assisted dying and a law legalising it will be drafted in due course. The Channel Island is the first country in the British Islands to approve the measure. The proposition, which was lodged by the Council of Ministers, proposes that a legal assisted dying service should be set up for residents over the age of 18 with a terminal illness or other incurable illness. The service will be voluntary and methods are either physician-assisted suicide or euthanasia.

This follows a campaign and overwhelming public support. Paul Gazzard and his late husband Alain du Chemin were key actors in the campaign in favour of legalising assisted dying. A citizen's jury was established, which recommended that assisted dying be legalised in the island.

The law was passed in February 2026, receiving royal assent in July 2026.

=== Luxembourg ===
After again failing to get royal assent for legalizing voluntary euthanasia and physician-assisted suicide, in December 2008, Luxembourg's parliament amended the country's constitution to take this power away from the monarch, the Grand Duke of Luxembourg. Voluntary euthanasia and physician-assisted suicide were legalized in the country in April 2009.

=== Netherlands ===
In 2002, the Netherlands became the first country in the world to formally legalize voluntary euthanasia. Physician-assisted suicide is legal under the same conditions as voluntary euthanasia. Physician-assisted suicide became allowed under the act approved in 2001 which became effective in 2002 and states the specific procedures and requirements needed in order to provide such assistance. Assisted suicide in the Netherlands follows a medical model which means that only doctors of patients who are suffering "unbearably without hope" are allowed to grant a request for an assisted suicide. The Netherlands allows people over the age of 12 to pursue an assisted suicide when deemed necessary.

In the Netherlands assisted dying followed by organ donation is also legal.

=== New Zealand ===
Assisted suicide was decriminalized after a binding referendum in 2020 on New Zealand's End of Life Choice Act 2019. The legislation provided for a year-long delay before it took effect on 6 November 2021. Under Section 179 of the Crimes Act 1961, it is illegal to 'aid and abet suicide' and this will remain the case outside the framework established under the End of Life Choice Act.

=== Norway ===
Assisted suicide is illegal in Norway. It is considered murder and is punishable by up to 21 years imprisonment.

=== Portugal ===
The Law n.º 22/2023, of 22 May, legalized physician-assisted death, which can be done by physician-assisted suicide and euthanasia. Physician-assisted death can only be permitted to adults, by their own decision, who are experiencing suffering of great intensity and who have a permanent injury of extreme severity or a serious and incurable disease.

The law is not yet in force, because the government has to regulate it first. It states in Article 31 that the regulation must be approved within 90 days of the publishing of the law, which would have been 23 August 2023. However, the regulation has not yet been approved by the government. According to Article 34, the law will only enter into force 30 days after the regulation is published. On 24 November 2023, the Ministry of Health said the regulation of the law would be the responsibility of the new government elected in the 10 March 2024 elections. As of 1 May 2026, the regulation has not yet been drafted and approved. The centre-right government considers that conditions are not yet right to move forward, citing a lack of "legal certainty" and decisions by the Constitutional Court as the main obstacles. The legislation, published on 25 May 2023, allows for medically assisted death in cases of serious and incurable illness or permanent injury of extreme severity. However, several provisions were deemed unconstitutional, which, according to the government, affected central elements of the legislation. The government understands that this is a matter of high ethical, legal, and clinical sensitivity, requiring prudence before any progress is made.

=== Slovenia ===
Assisted suicide is illegal in Slovenia and punishable by up to 5 years of prison unless there are aggravating or mitigating circumstances. The regulation of the "right to assistance in voluntary termination of life" was supported in a consultative referendum that was held on 9 June 2024. A bill to regulate this right passed a parliamentary vote on 24 July 2025, but was rejected by a quorum of voters in a legislative referendum held on 23 November 2025. The proposed law was strongly opposed by medical organizations and the Church.

=== South Africa ===
South Africa is struggling with the debate over legalizing voluntary euthanasia and physician-assisted suicide. Owing to the underdeveloped health care system that pervades the majority of the country, Willem Landman, "a member of the South African Law Commission, at a symposium on euthanasia at the World Congress of Family Doctors" stated that many South African doctors would be willing to perform acts of voluntary euthanasia when it became legalized in the country. He feels that because of the lack of doctors in the country, "[legalizing] euthanasia in South Africa would be premature and difficult to put into practice ...".

On 30 April 2015, the High Court in Pretoria granted Advocate Robin Stransham-Ford an order that would allow a doctor to assist him in taking his own life without the threat of prosecution. On 6 December 2016, the Supreme Court of Appeal overturned the High Court ruling.

=== Switzerland ===
Though it is illegal to assist a patient in dying in some circumstances, there are others where there is no offence committed. The relevant provision of the Swiss Criminal Code refers to "a person who, for selfish reasons, incites someone to commit suicide or who assists that person in doing so will, if the suicide was carried out or attempted, be sentenced to a term of imprisonment (Zuchthaus) of up to 5 years or a term of imprisonment (Gefängnis)."

A person brought to court on a charge could presumably avoid conviction by proving that they were "motivated by the good intentions of bringing about a requested death for the purposes of relieving "suffering" rather than for "selfish" reasons. In order to avoid conviction, the person has to prove that the deceased knew what they were doing, had the capacity to make the decision, and had made an "earnest" request, meaning they asked for death several times. The person helping also has to avoid actually doing the act that leads to death, lest they be convicted under Article 114: Killing on request (Tötung auf Verlangen) – A person who, for decent reasons, especially compassion, kills a person on the basis of their serious and insistent request, will be sentenced to a term of imprisonment (Gefängnis). For instance, it should be the suicide subject who actually presses the syringe or takes the pill, after the helper had prepared the setup. This way the country can criminalise certain controversial acts, which many of its people would oppose, while legalising a narrow range of assistive acts for some of those seeking help to end their lives.

Switzerland is the only country in the world which permits assisted suicide for non-resident foreigners, causing what some critics have described as suicide tourism. Between 1998 and 2018 around 1250 German citizens (almost three times the number of any other nationality) travelled to Dignitas in Zurich, Switzerland, for an assisted suicide. During the same period over 400 British citizens also opted to end their life at the same clinic.

In May 2011, Zurich held a referendum that asked voters whether (i) assisted suicide should be prohibited outright; and (ii) whether Dignitas and other assisted suicide providers should not admit overseas users. Zurich voters heavily rejected both bans, despite anti-euthanasia lobbying from two Swiss social conservative political parties, the Evangelical People's Party of Switzerland and Federal Democratic Union. The outright ban proposal was rejected by 84% of voters, while 78% voted to keep services open should overseas users require them.

In Switzerland non-physician-assisted suicide is legal, the assistance mostly being provided by volunteers, whereas in the Netherlands, a physician must be present. In Switzerland, the doctors are primarily there to assess the patient's decision capacity and prescribe the lethal drugs. Additionally, unlike cases in the United States, a person is not required to have a terminal illness but only the capacity to make decisions. About 25% of people in Switzerland who take advantage of assisted suicide do not have a terminal illness but are simply old or "tired of life".

250 accompanied suicides took place under the Dignitas program in Switzerland in 2023.

=== United Kingdom ===
==== England and Wales ====
Deliberately assisting a suicide is illegal. Between 2003 and 2006, Lord Joffe made four attempts to introduce bills that would have legalised physician-assisted suicide in England and Wales. All were rejected by the UK Parliament. In the meantime, the Director of Public Prosecutions has clarified the criteria under which an individual will be prosecuted in England and Wales for assisting in another person's suicide. These have not been tested by an appellate court as yet. In 2014, Lord Falconer of Thoroton tabled an Assisted Dying Bill in the House of Lords which passed its Second Reading but ran out of time before the general election. During its passage peers voted down two amendments which were proposed by opponents of the Bill. In 2015, Labour MP Rob Marris introduced another Bill, based on the Falconer proposals, in the House of Commons. The Second Reading was the first time the House was able to vote on the issue since 1997. A Populus poll had found that 82% of the British public agreed with the proposals of Lord Falconer's Assisted Dying Bill. However, in a free vote on 11 September 2015, only 118 MPs were in favour and 330 against, thus defeating the bill. Another bill called Terminally Ill Adults (End of Life) Bill on assisted suicide for terminally ill adults was voted on and passed on 29 November 2024, upon second reading. Further stages of Parliament's consideration of the bill should proceed.

==== Scotland ====
Unlike the other jurisdictions in the United Kingdom, suicide was not illegal in Scotland before 1961 (and still is not) thus no associated offences were created in imitation. Depending on the actual nature of any assistance given to a suicide, the offences of murder or culpable homicide might be committed or there might be no offence at all; the nearest modern prosecutions bearing comparison might be those where a culpable homicide conviction has been obtained when drug addicts have died unintentionally after being given "hands on" non-medical assistance with an injection. Modern law regarding the assistance of someone who intends to die has a lack of certainty as well as a lack of relevant case law; this has led to attempts to introduce statutes providing more certainty.

Independent MSP Margo MacDonald's "End of Life Assistance Bill" was brought before the Scottish Parliament to permit physician-assisted suicide in January 2010. The Catholic Church and the Church of Scotland, the largest denomination in Scotland, opposed the bill. The bill was rejected by a vote of 85–16 (with 2 abstentions) in December 2010.

The Assisted Suicide (Scotland) Bill was introduced on 13 November 2013 by the late Margo MacDonald MSP and was taken up by Patrick Harvie MSP on Ms MacDonald's death. The Bill entered the main committee scrutiny stage in January 2015 and reached a vote in Parliament several months later; however the bill was again rejected.

The Assisted Dying for Terminally Ill Adults (Scotland) Bill was introduced by Liam McArthur MSP on 27 March 2024. It would allow terminally adults to request and receive assistance from medical professionals to end their life.

==== Northern Ireland ====
Health is a devolved matter in the United Kingdom and as such it would be for the Northern Ireland Assembly to legislate for assisted dying as it sees fit. As of 2018, there has been no such bill tabled in the Assembly.

=== United States ===
State laws regarding Medical Aid in Dying in the United States Assisted dying is legal Pending legislation to legalize assisted dying

Physician-assisted dying was first legalized by the 1994 Oregon Death with Dignity Act, with effect delayed by lawsuits until 1997. As of 2026, it is legal in the following states and districts:

- Oregon since 1997
- Washington (state) since 2008
- Montana since 2009
- Vermont since 2013
- California since 2016
- Colorado since 2016
- Washington, D.C. since 2017
- Hawaii since 2018
- New Jersey since 2019
- Maine since 2020
- New Mexico since 2021
- Delaware since 2025
- New York since 2026
- Illinois since 2026

Montana is the only state in which medical aid in dying is legal due to a court ruling, rather than a state law. The Montana Supreme Court ruled in Baxter v. Montana (2009) that it found no state law or public policy reason that would prohibit physician-assisted dying.

Access to the procedure is generally restricted to people with a terminal illness and less than six months to live. Patients are generally required to be mentally capable, to get approval from multiple doctors, and to affirm the request multiple times.

For states in which it is illegal, the punishment for participating in medical aid in dying varies. For example, the state of Wyoming does not "recognize common law crimes and does not have a statute specifically prohibiting physician-assisted suicide". While in Florida, "every person deliberately assisting another in the commission of self-murder shall be guilty of manslaughter, a felony of the second degree".

=== Uruguay ===
Assisted suicide, while criminal, does not appear to have caused any convictions, as article 37 of the Penal Code (effective 1934) states: "The judges are authorized to forego punishment of a person whose previous life has been honorable where he commits a homicide motivated by compassion, induced by repeated requests of the victim."

== Arguments for and against ==
=== Arguments for ===
Arguments in support of assisted suicide include

- reduction of human suffering
- compassion
- respect for patient autonomy
- personal liberty
- equal treatment of terminally ill patients on and off life support
- transparency
- ethics of responsibility

==== Reasons given by people for seeking assisted suicide ====
In 2022 in the Oregon program, the most frequently reported end-of-life concerns were

- decreasing ability to participate in activities that made life enjoyable (89%)
- loss of autonomy (86%)
- loss of dignity (62%)
- burden on family/caregivers (46%)
- losing control of bodily functions (44%)
- inadequate pain control, or concern about it (31%)
- financial implications of treatment (6%)

Previous years had seen similar factors.

Pain has mostly not been reported as the primary motivation for seeking assisted suicide in the United States.

=== Arguments against ===
Arguments against assisted dying are:

- lack of genuine consent: Some are concerned that vulnerable populations may be at risk of untimely deaths because "patients might be subjected to PAD without their genuine consent".
- slippery slope: This concern is that once assisted suicide is initiated for the terminally ill, it will progress to other vulnerable communities, namely disabled people, and may begin to be used by those who feel less worthy based on their demographic or socioeconomic status. The UK Government Health and Social Care Select Committee found no evidence of the 'slippery slope' having occurred when it examined the global assisted suicide situation in 2024.

== Opinions ==
=== Medical ethics ===
==== Hippocratic Oath ====
Some doctors state that physician-assisted suicide is contrary to the Hippocratic Oath (c. 400 BC), which is the oath historically taken by physicians. It states: "I will give no deadly medicine to any one if asked, nor suggest any such counsel." However, the original oath has been modified many times and, contrary to popular belief, is not required by most modern medical schools, nor does it confer any legal obligations on individuals who choose to take it. There are also procedures forbidden by the Hippocratic Oath that are in common practice today, such as abortion and execution.

==== Declaration of Geneva ====
The Declaration of Geneva is a revision of the Hippocratic Oath, first drafted in 1948 by the World Medical Association in response to forced (involuntary) euthanasia, eugenics and other medical crimes performed in Nazi Germany. It states "I will respect the autonomy and dignity of my patient," as well as "I will maintain the utmost respect for human life."

==== International Code of Medical Ethics ====
The International Code of Medical Ethics, last revised in 2006, states that "a physician shall always bear in mind the obligation to respect human life" in the section "duties of physicians to patients."

==== Statement of Marbella ====
The Statement of Marbella was adopted by the 44th World Medical Assembly in Marbella, Spain, in 1992. It provides that "physician-assisted suicide, like voluntary euthanasia, is unethical and must be condemned by the medical profession."

==== American Medical Association Code of Ethics ====
As of 2022, the American Medical Association (AMA) opposed medical aid in dying. In response to the ongoing debate about medical aid in dying, the AMA has issued guidance for both those who support and oppose physician-assisted suicide. The AMA Code of Ethics Opinion 5.7 states that "physician-assisted suicide is fundamentally incompatible with the physician's role as healer," and that it would be "difficult or impossible to control, and would pose serious societal risks," but does not explicitly prohibit the practice. The AMA Code of Ethics Opinion 1.1.7 "articulates the thoughtful moral basis for those who support assisted suicide," and states that outside of specific situations in which physicians have clear obligations, such as emergency care or respect for civil rights, "physicians may be able to act (or refrain from acting) in accordance with the dictates of their conscience without violating their professional obligations."

=== Healthcare Provider Opinions ===
In many medical aid in dying programs, physicians play a significant role, usually expressed as "gatekeeper," often putting them at the forefront of the issue. Decades of research and polling show that physicians in the US and several European countries are less supportive of the legalization of medical aid in dying than the general public. While "about two-thirds of the American public since the 1970s" has supported legalization, surveys of American physicians "rarely show as much as half supporting a move" towards legalization. However, the opinions of physicians and other healthcare professionals vary widely on the issue of physician-assisted suicide, as shown in the following tables.

Study	Population	Responses	Willing to assist	Not willing to assist
Canadian Medical Association, 2011	Canadian Medical Association	2,125	16%	44%
Cohen, 1994 (NEJM)	Washington state doctors	938	40%	49%
Lee, 1996 (NEJM)	Oregon state doctors	2,761	46%	31%

Study	Population	Responses	In favor of legalization	Not in favor of legalization
Medscape Ethics Report, 2014	U.S.-based doctors		54%	31%
Seale, 2009	United Kingdom doctors	3,733	35%	62.2%
Cohen, 1994 (NEJM)	Washington state doctors	938	53%	39%

A 2019 survey of US physicians found that 60% of physicians answered 'yes' to the question "Should PAS be legalized in your state?" The survey indicated that physicians are concerned about a possible "slippery slope." 30% agreed that "PAS/AID would lead to the legalization of euthanasia," and 46% agreed that "Health insurance companies would cover PAS/AID over more expensive, possibly life-saving treatments, like chemotherapy." The survey also revealed that physicians generally misunderstand why patients seek PAS. 49% of physicians agreed that "most patients who seek PAS/AID do so because of physical pain," whereas studies conducted in Oregon found that "the three most frequently mentioned end-of-life concerns were loss of autonomy (89.5%), decreasing ability to participate in activities that made life enjoyable (89.5%), and loss of dignity (65.4%)." In addition, the survey found that the physicians were concerned about the adequacy of safeguards. While 59% agreed that "current PAS laws provide adequate safeguards," there was greater concern surrounding specific safeguards. 60% disagreed that "physicians who are not psychiatrists are sufficiently trained to screen for depression in patients who are seeking PAS," and 60% disagreed that "most physicians can predict with certainty whether a patient seeking PAS/AID has 6 months or less to live." The concern about adequate safeguards is even greater among Oregon emergency physicians; one study found that "only 37% indicated that the Oregon initiative has enough safeguards to protect vulnerable persons."

Attitudes toward medical aid in dying vary by health profession as well. An extensive survey of 3,733 physicians, sponsored by the National Council for Palliative Care, Age Concern, Help the Hospices, Macmillan Cancer Support, the Motor Neurone Disease Association, the MS Society and Sue Ryder Care showed that opposition to voluntary euthanasia and PAS was highest among palliative care and geriatrics, with more than 90% of palliative care specialists against changing the law.

A 1997 study by Glasgow University's Institute of Law & Ethics in Medicine found pharmacists (72%) and anaesthetists (56%) to be generally in favor of legalizing PAS. Pharmacists were twice as likely as medical GPs to endorse the view that "if a patient has decided to end their own life, then doctors should be allowed in law to assist." A report published in January 2017 by NPR suggests that the thoroughness of protections that allow physicians to refrain from participating in the municipalities that legalized assisted suicide within the United States creates a lack of access by those who would otherwise be eligible for the practice.

A poll in the United Kingdom showed that 54% of GPs are either supportive or neutral towards the introduction of assisted dying laws. A similar poll on Doctors.net.uk published in the BMJ reported that 55% of doctors would support it. In contrast, the BMA, which represents doctors in the UK, opposes it.

An anonymous, confidential postal survey of all General Practitioners in Northern Ireland, conducted in 2000, found that over 70% of responding GPs were opposed to physician-assisted suicide and voluntary active euthanasia.

=== Public opinion on medical aid in dying ===
==== U.S. Polls ====
A recent poll in 2024 by Gallup News found that Americans overwhelmingly supported medical aid in dying, with 71% of people "believe doctors should be allowed by law to end the patient’s life by some painless means if the patient and his or her family request it.”

A survey in 2009 from the Journal of Palliative Medicine, found that family caregivers of patients who chose assisted death were more likely to find positive meaning in caring for the patient and felt more prepared for the patient's death than the family caregivers of patients who did not request assisted death.

=== Organisations taking neutral positions ===
There have been calls for organisations representing medical professionals to take a neutral stance on medical aid in dying, rather than a position of opposition. The reasoning is that this supposedly would better reflect the views of medical professionals and that of wider society, and prevent those bodies from exerting undue influence over the debate.

The UK Royal College of Nursing voted in July 2009 to move to a neutral position on medical aid in dying.

The California Medical Association dropped its long-standing opposition in 2015 during the debate over whether a medical aid in dying bill should be introduced there, prompted in part by cancer sufferer Brittany Maynard. The California End of Life Option Act was signed into law later that year.

In December 2017, the Massachusetts Medical Society (MMS) voted to repeal their opposition to medical aid in dying and adopt a position of neutrality.

In October 2018, the American Academy of Family Physicians (AAFP) voted to adopt a position of neutrality from one of opposition. This is contrary to the position taken by the American Medical Association (AMA), which opposes it.

In January 2019 the British Royal College of Physicians announced it would adopt a position of neutrality until two-thirds of its members think it should either support or oppose the legalization of medical aid in dying.

In September 2021, the largest doctors union in the United Kingdom, the British Medical Association, adopted a neutral stance towards a change in the law on assisted dying, replacing their position of opposition which had been in place since 2006.

=== Organisations active in assisted suicide ===
- Death with Dignity National Center is a nonprofit US organisation active in end of life advocacy and policy reform. The organization has been advocating for physician-assisted suicide and euthanasia since 1994.
- Compassion & Choices is a nonprofit US organisation active in end of life and other care issues.
- Care Not Killing is a UK organisation opposed to euthanasia.

=== Religious stances ===
==== Religions in favor ====
===== Unitarian Universalism =====
According to a 1988 General Resolution, "Unitarian Universalists advocate the right to self-determination in dying, and the release from civil or criminal penalties of those who, under proper safeguards, act to honor the right of terminally ill patients to select the time of their own deaths".

==== Religions in opposition ====
===== Catholicism =====
The Catholic Church acknowledges the fact that moral decisions regarding a person's life must be made according to one's own conscience and faith. Catholic tradition has said that one's concern for the suffering of another is not a sufficient reason to decide whether it is appropriate to act upon voluntary euthanasia. According to the Catechism of the Catholic Church, "God is the creator and author of all life." In this belief system God created human life, therefore God is the judge of when to end life. From the Catholic Church's perspective, deliberately ending one's life or the life of another is morally wrong and defies the Catholic doctrine. Furthermore, ending one's life deprives that person and his or her loved ones of the time left in life and causes grief and sorrow for those left behind.

Pope Francis affirmed that death is a glorious event and should not be decided for by anyone other than God. Pope Francis insinuates that defending life means defending its sacredness. The Catholic Church teaches its followers that the act of euthanasia is unacceptable because it is perceived as a sin, as it goes against one of the Ten Commandments. As implied by the fifth commandment, "Thou shalt not kill (You shall not kill)", the act of assisted suicide contradicts the dignity of human life as well as the respect one has for God. Additionally, the Catholic Church recommends that terminally ill patients should receive palliative care, which deals with physical pain while treating psychological and spiritual suffering as well, instead of physician-assisted suicide.

===== Eastern Orthodoxy =====
In the Eastern Orthodox Church, assisted suicide is condemned on the same basis as regular suicide, that being they both "deny God's lordship over life."

===== Hinduism =====
In Hinduism, active suicide is viewed as a serious act because it conflicts with core principles like dharma (duty), karma (actions and their consequences), and ahimsa (non-violence). While there is no definitive teaching on suicide and assisted suicide within Hinduism, prematurely ending one's life or assisting in such an act can adversely affect the karma of both the person who dies and the one who aids in the act. Deepak Sarma, a professor of South Asian religions and philosophy at Case Western Reserve University in Cleveland, explains, "If you circumvent karma by taking some action to stop suffering, you will pay for it later." Hinduism upholds the principle of "Ahimsa Paramo Dharma", meaning "Ahimsa (non-violence) is the highest form of dharma (virtue)". Although, Hindus are not meant to be indifferent to the sufferings of others. One should avoid committing acts of violence in thought, word, or deed against any living creature. Therefore, the practice of euthanasia would be seen as breaching the teachings of ahimsa. Hinduism, however, permits Prayopavesa which involves death by fasting for terminal illnesses or great disability.

===== Islam =====
According to the Islamic approach, a Muslim doctor should not intervene directly to voluntarily take the life of the patient, not even out of pity (Islamic Code of Medical Ethics, Kuwait 1981); he must see whether the patient is curable or not, not whether he must continue to live. Similarly, he must not administer drugs that accelerate death, even after an explicit request by relatives; acceleration of this kind would correspond to murder. Quran 3.145 states: "Nor can a soul die except by God's leave, the term being fixed as by writing"; Quran 3.156 continues "It is God that gives Life and Death, and God sees well all that ye do", resulting that God has fixed the length of each life, but leaves room for human efforts to save it when some hope exists. The patient's request for his life to be ended has in part been evaluated by juridical doctrine in some aspects. The four "canonical" Sunnite juridical schools (Hanafis, Malikis, Shafi'is and Hanbalis) were not unanimous in their pronouncements. For all, the request or permission to be killed does not make the action, which remains a murder, lawful; however, the disagreement concerns the possibility of applying punishments to those that cause death: the Hanafis are in favour; the Hanbalis, the Shafi'is and the Malikis are partly in favour and partly contrary to penal sanctions.

In June 1995 the Muslim Medical Doctors Conference in Malaysia (Kuala Lumpur) reasserted that euthanasia (not better defined) goes against the principles of Islam; this is also valid in the military context, prohibiting a seriously wounded soldier from committing suicide or asking other soldiers to kill him out of pity or to avoid falling into enemy hands.

===== Judaism =====
While preservation of life is one of the greatest values in Judaism, there are instances of suicide and assisted suicide appearing in the Bible and Rabbinic literature. The medieval authorities debate the legitimacy of those measures and in what limited circumstances they might apply. The conclusion of the majority of later rabbinic authorities, and accepted normative practice within Judaism, is that suicide and assisted suicide can not be sanctioned even for a terminal patient in intractable pain.

===== The Church of Jesus Christ of Latter-day Saints =====
The Church of Jesus Christ of Latter-day Saints (LDS Church) is against assisted suicide and euthanasia, and anyone who takes part in either is regarded as having violated the commandments of God. However the church recognizes that when a person is in the final stages of terminal illness there may be difficult decisions to be taken. The church states that "When dying becomes inevitable, death should be looked upon as a blessing and a purposeful part of an eternal existence. Members should not feel obligated to extend mortal life by means that are unreasonable".

== Statistics on medical aid in dying programs ==
=== Statistics by leading countries ===
Countries with the highest levels of assisted dying, according to the newest available data, are

- Canada: 10,064 (2024)
- Netherlands: 9,958 (2024)
- Belgium: 2,699 (2021)

In Canada, assisted deaths of 13,241 in 2024 made up 4.2% of all deaths.

In the Netherlands deaths by euthanasia in 2023 were 9,068, an increase of 4% on 2022. These deaths were 5% of all deaths.

In California 853 assisted deaths were recorded in 2022.

=== Oregon ===
In the Oregon program 2,454 deaths had occurred from 2001 to 2022.

During 2022, 431 people (384 in 2021) received prescriptions for lethal doses of medications under the provisions of the Oregon DWDA, and at January 20, 2023, OHA had received reports of 278 of these people (255 in 2021) dying through ingesting those medications. 85% were aged 65 years or older, and 96% were white. The most common underlying illnesses were cancer (64%), heart disease (12%) and neurological disease (10%). 92% died at home. (See the arguments section above for reasons for using the program, and the methods section above for further information.)

In February 2016, Oregon released a report on its 2015 numbers. In 2015, there were 218 people in the state who were approved and received the lethal drugs to end their own life. Of that 218, 125 have been confirmed to have ultimately decided to ingest drugs, resulting in their death. 50 did not ingest medication and died from other means, while the ingestion status of the remaining 43 is unknown. According to the state of Oregon Public Health Division's survey, the majority of the participants, 78%, were 65 years of age or older and predominantly white, 93.1%. 72% of the terminally ill patients who opted for ending their own lives had been diagnosed with some form of cancer. In the state of Oregon's 2015 survey, they asked the terminally ill who were participating in medical aid in dying, what their biggest end-of-life concerns were: 96.2% of those people mentioned the loss of the ability to participate in activities that once made them enjoy life, 92.4% mentioned the loss of autonomy, or the independence of their own thoughts or actions, and 75.4% stated loss of their dignity.

A 2015 Journal of Palliative Medicine report on patterns of hospice use noted that Oregon was in both the highest quartile of hospice use and the lowest quartile of potentially concerning patterns of hospice use. A similar trend was found in Vermont, where aid-in-dying (AiD) was authorized in 2013.

A 2002 study of hospice nurses and social workers in Oregon reported that symptoms of pain, depression, anxiety, extreme air hunger and fear of the process of dying were more pronounced among hospice patients who did not request a lethal prescription for barbiturates, the drug used for physician-assisted death.

=== Washington State ===
An increasing trend in deaths caused by ingesting lethal doses of medications prescribed by physicians was also noted in Washington: from 64 deaths in 2009 to 202 deaths in 2015. Among the deceased, 72% had terminal cancer and 8% had neurodegenerative diseases (including ALS).

== Publicized cases ==
In 2006, British doctor Anne Turner died of assisted suicide in a Zurich clinic having developed an incurable degenerative disease. Her story was reported by the BBC and later, in 2009, made into a TV film A Short Stay in Switzerland starring Julie Walters.

In 2009, British conductor Sir Edward Downes and his wife Joan died together at a suicide clinic outside Zürich "under circumstances of their own choosing". Sir Edward was not terminally ill, but his wife was diagnosed with rapidly developing cancer.

In 2010, the American PBS TV program Frontline showed a documentary called The Suicide Tourist which told the story of Professor Craig Ewert, his family, and Dignitas, and his decision to die by assisted suicide using sodium pentobarbital in Switzerland after he was diagnosed and suffering with ALS (Lou Gehrig's disease).

In 2011, the BBC televised the assisted suicide of Peter Smedley, a canning factory owner, who was suffering from motor neurone disease. The programme – Terry Pratchett: Choosing to Die – told the story of Smedley's journey to the end where he used The Dignitas Clinic, a voluntary euthanasia clinic in Switzerland, to assist him in carrying out his suicide. The programme shows Smedley eating chocolates to counter the unpalatable taste of the liquid he drinks to end his life. Moments after drinking the liquid, Smedley begged for water, gasped for breath and became red, he then fell into a deep sleep where he snored heavily while holding his wife's hand. Minutes later, Smedley stopped breathing and his heart stopped beating.

In 2022 in Colombia Victor Escobar became the first person with a non-terminal illness to die by legally regulated euthanasia. The 60-year-old Escobar had end-stage chronic obstructive pulmonary disease.

In 2024, Brazilian poet/writer Antonio Cicero traveled to Switzerland where he underwent the process. Having been diagnosed with Alzheimer's disease in 2019, Cícero carried out the procedure in Zurich and died on October 23, 2024, at the age of 79. His life partner, Marcelo Pies, was present during it.

In 2025 Wayne Hawkins in California invited the BBC to be present at his assisted suicide.

== See also ==
- Bioethics
- Betty and George Coumbias
- Capital punishment
- Consensual homicide
- Euthanasia device
- Jack Kevorkian
- Legality of euthanasia
- List of deaths from legal euthanasia and assisted suicide
- Brittany Maynard
- Organ donation after medical assistance in dying
- Philip Nitschke
- Right to Die? (2008 film)
- Senicide
- A Short Stay in Switzerland (2009 film)
- Suicide by cop
- Suicide legislation
- You Don't Know Jack (2010 film)
- The Chalice of Courage (1915 film)
