= Kick the bucket =

English idiom meaning "to die"

To kick the bucket is an English idiom considered a euphemistic, informal, or slang term meaning "to die". Its origin remains unclear, though there have been several theories.

== Origin theories ==
A common theory is that the idiom refers to hanging, either as a method of execution or suicide. However, the actual origin of the idiom is a matter of dispute. Its earliest appearance is in the Dictionary of the Vulgar Tongue (1785), where it is defined as "to die". In John Badcock's slang dictionary of 1823, the explanation is given that "One Bolsover having hung himself from a beam while standing on a pail, or bucket, kicked this vessel away in order to pry into futurity and it was all UP with him from that moment: Finis".

The theory favoured by the OED relates to the alternative definition of a bucket as a beam or yoke that can be used to hang or carry things on. The "bucket" may refer to the beam on which slaughtered pigs are suspended. The animals may struggle on the bucket, hence the expression. The word "bucket" still can be used today to refer to such a beam in the Norfolk dialect. It is thought that this definition came from the French word trébuchet or buque, meaning "balance". William Shakespeare used the word in this sense in his play Henry IV Part II where Falstaff says:

Swifter than he that gibbets on the Brewers Bucket.

— William Shakespeare, Henry IV, Part II

It has also been speculated that the phrase might originate from the Catholic custom of holy-water buckets:

After death, when a body had been laid out ... the holy-water bucket was brought from the church and put at the feet of the corpse. When friends came to pray... they would sprinkle the body with holy water ... it is easy to see how such a saying as "kicking the bucket" came about. Many other explanations of this saying have been given by persons who are unacquainted with Catholic custom

— The Right Reverend Abbot Horne, Relics of Popery

Alternatively, at the moment of death, a person may stretch their legs (Spanish: estirar la pata, "to die") and kick a nearby bucket.

Yet another theory seeks to extend the saying beyond its earliest use in the 16th century with reference to the Latin proverb Capra Scyria, the goat that is said to kick over the pail after being milked (920 in Erasmus' Adagia). Thus a promising beginning is followed by a bad ending or, as Andrea Alciato phrased it in the Latin poem accompanying the drawing in his Emblemata (1524), "Because you have spoilt your fine beginnings with a shameful end and turned your service into harm, you have done what the she-goat does when she kicks the bucket that holds her milk and with her hoof squanders her own riches." Here it is the death of one's reputation that is in question.

== American variations ==
At one time the American and Caribbean expression "kickeraboo" used to be explained as a deformed version of "kick the bucket". The expression occurs as the title of a mid-19th-century American minstrel ballad with the ending "Massa Death bring one bag and we Kickeraboo". However, it is now thought that it may have derived from a native word in one of the West African creoles. The expression "kek(e)rebu" is first recorded in 1721 with the meaning "to die" in the Krio language of Sierra Leone. Earlier still "Kickativoo" is recorded in Ghana (then known as the Gold or Slave Coast). In 1680 it referred to the capsizing of a canoe but also had the meaning "to die".

Whatever African American usage might have been in the 19th century, by the 20th century they were using the idiom "kick the bucket". It occurs in the jazz classic Old Man Mose, recorded by Louis Armstrong in the United States in 1935, and in the West Indies it figured in the title of the reggae hit “Long Shot kick de bucket”, recorded by The Pioneers in 1969. In the case of the latter, the song refers to the death of a horse.

In North America, a variation of the idiom is "kick off". A related phrase is to "hand in one's dinner pail", a bucket that contains a worker's dinner. Another variation, "bucket list", a wish list of things to do before one dies, is derived from "to kick the bucket".

== See also ==
- List of expressions related to death
