= List of Russian-language euphemisms for dying =

The Russian language has a large number of euphemisms and synonyms for the verb "to die".

- (ironical) Выносить/ вынести вперёд ногами (To carry someone out legs first); The phrase refers to the tradition to carry the coffin out of the house legs first.
- (euphemism, dated) лежать под святыми (To lie under the saints); The expression refers to the tradition that a deceased person is laid down in his house under the icons.
- "уважать себя заставил", "he got himself to be respected" is an expression from the prologue of the poem Eugene Onegin by Alexander Pushkin. Many sources claim that this expression was a well-known euphemism for "to die" at the times of Pushkin. However philologist from the Moscow State University Olga Kukushkina by analyzing the poem in detail and the meanings of the verb "to respect", contests this statement and suggests that the expression was used in the direct meaning of paying an attention to a terminally ill person, to whom otherwise Onegin was indifferent.
- synonyms for "гигнуться": загнуть копыта, отдать концы, врезать дубаря, отбросить когти, задрать ноги, дать дубаря, откинуть хвост, откинуть коньки, откинуть копыта, протянуть ноги, скапутиться, умереть, дать дуба, перекинуться, скопытиться, порешиться, скапуститься, околеть, издохнуть, подохнуть, кончиться, скончаться, окочуриться, загнуться, сдохнуть, свернуться
- synonyms for "кончиться" in the meaning of "to die": лечь в землю, уйти из жизни, отправиться к праотцам, отмаяться, лечь в гроб, дать дуба, отправиться на тот свет, отмучиться, скапуститься, скопытиться, перекинуться, протянуть ноги, смежить очи, сойти в могилу, опочить, устать, почить, расстаться с жизнью, сойти в гроб, уйти/отправиться в елисейские поля, лечь в могилу, отойти в лоно авраама, в бозе почить, окончить счеты с жизнью, окончить земное поприще, отправиться в елисейские поля, уснуть могильным сном, испустить дух, испустить последний вздох, уснуть последним сном, приказать долго жить, отдать богу душу, уснуть вечным сном, отойти в иной мир, почить вечным сном, переселиться в иной мир, кончить счеты с жизнью, отойти в лучший мир, предстать перед богом, отойти от мира сего, приказать долго здравствовать, решиться жизни, уснуть навеки, покинуть земную сень, отойти в вечность, окончить земное существование, переселиться в лучший мир, упокоиться, окочуриться, скапутиться, преставиться, скончаться, загнуться, покинуть земные пределы, издохнуть, угаснуть, помереть, порешиться, отойти в лоно авраамово, отойти, окончиться, подохнуть, завершиться,

In the satirical picaresque novel Twelve Chairs by Ilf and Petrov, the coffinmaker Bezenchuk gives Ippolit Matveyevich Vorobyaninov the following classification of references to death depending on the persona of the deceased. Below is the table "Deceased persona / Russian term / Literal translation / Translation by Anne O. Fisher, 2011 / Translation by John H.C. Richardson, 1973":

Persona	Russian term	Literal translation	Fisher	Richardson
Old lady, small and plump	преставилась	(Note: the verb преставиться came from Old Church Slavonic прѣставити сѩ, with сѩ (ся) being the reflexive particle. And the base verb is thought to be a calque from Greek μετατίθεσθαι, "to be transported")	departed this life	pass away
Old lady, tall and thin	богу душу отдает	gives her soul to God	gave up her soul to God	departed this life
Ippolit Matveyevich, by the virtue of him being tall, skinny, and prominent	в ящик сыграл	Played into the box	cashed in his chips	popped off
merchant, of merchant sosloviye	приказал долго жить	"ordered to live long"	meet his Maker	breathe his last
of lesser class: street sweeper or peasant	перекинулся or ноги протянул	"transformed"/"moved over" or "stretched his legs"	kicked the bucket or stretched out his legs for good	croaked or gone west
Man of stature, such as a railway conductor or a person of authority	дуба дал	(Note: from "задубеть", "become as hard as an oak because of cold")	gave up the ghost	kicked the bucket
Bezenchuk himself, being a little man	гигнулся	unknown etymology	fizzled	gone

== See also ==
- Death in Russian traditions
- List of English-language expressions related to death
- Wikisaurus:die
- Wikisaurus:death
