= Will Knightley =

English television and stage actor (born 1946)

- Born: Kevin William Knightley; 23 April 1946 (age 80); London, England
- Education: Royal Central School of Speech and Drama
- Occupation: Actor
- Years active: 1969–present
- Spouse: Sharman Macdonald (m. 1976)
- Children: 2, including Keira

Kevin William Knightley (born 23 April 1946) is an English television and stage actor.

== Early life ==
Knightley was born on April 23, 1946 in London, England.

== Career ==
He has primarily worked on the stage, and is a founding member of London's Half Moon Theatre. In addition to acting, he has performed voice-over work. He has had TV appearances in The Bill, A Touch of Frost, Midsomer Murders and various adverts. In 2009, he appeared in the BBC drama A Short Stay in Switzerland.

In 2004, he appeared on the British series Rosemary & Thyme in the episode "Orpheus in the Undergrowth" as character Jeremy Pearson. He is the father of composer Caleb Knightley (b. 1979) and actress Keira Knightley (b. 1985).

== Personal life ==
Knightley married Scottish playwright Sharman Macdonald in 1976, together they have 2 children, including actress Keira Knightley.

== Selected credits ==
- EastEnders (2014) as Henry Summerhayes
- A Short Stay in Switzerland (2009) as Dr Jack Turner
- Calendar Girls (2009, stage play)
- Flight Path (2007, stage play)
- Cinderella (2005-6, stage pantomime) as Baron Hardup
- Lone Star Mark Three (2005, stage play)
- The Permanent Way (2005, stage play)
- The Brief (2004, TV series) as Gerry Graham
- Rosemary & Thyme (2004, TV series) as Jeremy Pearson
- The Project (2002, TV movie) as Alan Dunn
- Our God's Country (2002, stage play) as Captain Arthur Phillip
- The School for Scandal (1996-7, stage play) as Sir Peter Teasle
- Woman in Mind (1994, stage play) as Andy
- Hush (1992, stage play) as Colin
- Diplomatic Waves (1989, stage play) as John
- Wild Honey (1984, stage play)
- The Hound of the Baskervilles (1982, television serial) as Dr. Mortimer
- Epsom Downs (1977, stage play)
- Afternoon Theatre: Only A Game (1976, radio play)
- Confessions of a Justified Sinner (1971, stage play) as Friend, Officer
