= Epsom Downs (play) =

Epsom Downs is a 1977 play by Howard Brenton. Taking its name from the racecourse at which it is set, the play presents a panorama of race-goers, horse-owners, bookies, jockeys, etc. on Derby Day 1977, giving it the feel of a modern city comedy.

The play was commissioned by Joint Stock, a company which works with the writer on researching and devising their plays, but who leave the final writing of the script to the author. It was first performed at The Roundhouse on 8 August 1977, the director was Max Stafford-Clark and the cast, each of whom played multiple roles (the play has almost 50 characters), was: Gillian Barge, Simon Callow, Paul Freeman, Bob Hamilton, Cecily Hobbs, Will Knightley, David Rintoul, Tony Rohr, and Jane Wood.

Writing in The Guardian, Michael Billington described Epsom Downs as Brenton's “most accessible and simply enjoyable play”.

The play was revived in 1992 at the Bristol Old Vic, directed by Ian Hastings. It was also revived in 2012 at the Salisbury Playhouse.
