= Antonio Cicero =

Brazilian composer (1945–2024)

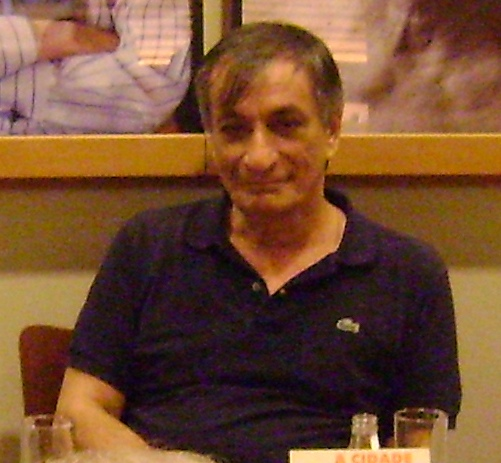
- Cicero in 2010
- Born: Antonio Cicero Correia Lima; October 6, 1945; Rio de Janeiro, Rio de Janeiro, Brazil
- Died: October 23, 2024 (aged 79); Zurich, Switzerland
- Occupations: Composer; writer; poet; philosopher; literary critic
- Relatives: Marina Lima (sister)

Antônio Cícero Correia Lima (October 6, 1945 – October 23, 2024) was a Brazilian composer, poet, literary critic, philosopher and writer. He wrote poetry and philosophy books, and had a prolific career as a lyricist, composing lyrics for songs by artists such as Marina Lima (his sister), João Bosco, Waly Salomão, Orlando Morais, Ritchie, Adriana Calcanhotto, and Lulu Santos.

On August 10, 2017, he was elected member of the Brazilian Academy of Letters, taking office on March 16, 2018.

== Biography ==
Antonio Cicero was born in Rio de Janeiro to Amélia Correia Lima and Ewaldo Correia Lima originally from Piauí. His father was one of the founding intellectuals of the Brazilian Institute of Higher Studies (ISEB), and was also director of the BNDE during Juscelino Kubitschek's government. In 1960, Ewaldo took on an executive position at the newly created Inter-American Development Bank (IDB), and the whole family moved to Washington, D.C. where Cicero completed his secondary studies.

Back in Brazil, Cicero began studying philosophy at the Pontifical Catholic University of Rio de Janeiro and, later, at the Institute of Philosophy and Social Sciences at the Federal University of Rio de Janeiro. In 1969, due to political problems, he went to London, where he completed a philosophy course at the University of London. In 1976, Cicero went to graduate school at Georgetown University, in the United States, where he studied Greek and Latin, which allowed him to read classics such as Homer, Pindar, Horace and Ovid in the original. Later he would teach Philosophy and Logic at universities in Rio de Janeiro.

=== Death ===
After being diagnosed with Alzheimer's disease, Cicero decided to receive assisted death and moved to Switzerland, where the practice is legal. He carried out the procedure in Zurich and died on October 23, 2024, at the age of 79. Marcelo Pies, a costume designer, was Cicero's life partner for four decades and was present during his assisted death.

=== Poetry and lyrics ===
Antonio Cicero wrote poetry since his youth, but his poems only appeared to the general public when his sister, the singer and composer Marina Lima, started to set them to music. Before, however, there were already his songs like Fullgás, Para Começar and À Francesa − the first two in partnership with his sister, and the last with Cláudio Zoli. From then on, Cicero would become one of Marina's closest partners. Among other partnerships, those with Waly Salomão, João Bosco, Orlando Morais, Adriana Calcanhotto, Ritchie and Lulu Santos (co-author, together with Antonio Cicero and Sérgio Souza, of the 1984 hit O Último Romântico) stand out.

== Works ==
=== Philosophy essays ===
- O mundo desde o fim. Rio de Janeiro: Francisco Alves, 1995.
- Finalidades sem fim. São Paulo: Companhia das Letras, 2005.
- Poesia e filosofia. Rio de Janeiro: Civilização Brasileira, 2012.

=== Poetry ===
- Guardar. Rio de Janeiro: Record, 1996.
- A cidade e os livros. Rio de Janeiro: Record, 2002.
- Livro de sombras: pintura, cinema e poesia (with artist Luciano Figueiredo). Rio de Janeiro, + 2 Editora, 2010.
- Porventura. Rio de Janeiro: Record, 2012.

=== Interviews ===
- Antonio Cicero por Antonio Cicero. Org. por Arthur Nogueira.

=== Works as organizer ===
- Nova antologia poética de Vinícius de Moraes (with the poet Eucanaã Ferraz). São Paulo: Companhia das Letras, 2003.
- O relativismo enquanto visão do mundo (with the poet Waly Salomão). Rio de Janeiro: Francisco Alves, 1994.
- Forma e sentido contemporâneo. Rio de Janeiro: EDUERJ, 2012.
