= Death in Russian traditions =

There are many interpretations of death in Russian folk traditions. It can be reversible, and it sometimes resides outside of the body. It is also closely related to sleep. It is believed that when one sleeps one can traverse the “other world” and come back alive. There are two kinds of deaths. A person who dies in their old age surrounded by family died a “good” death, a death that was “their own.” They depart when God says they should. A person who dies a “bad” death, or a death “not their own,” died too soon before the time God assigned them. These people may have been murdered, committed suicide, died of illness, or in war. Because of the nature of these deaths the earth cannot accept them until their time comes, which means they do not receive a proper burial. Sometimes they are not buried at all, but covered with rocks or sticks. Russians associate “good” deaths with bringing good harvests, while attributing storms, droughts, and other forms of destruction to “bad” deaths.

== Funeral rites ==
Several steps must be taken once a person has died so their body can be buried and their soul can travel to the “other world.” The first step is washing the body. In a Dual-Faith (dvoeverie) setting (in which Orthodoxy and folk tradition are combined) this ritual prepares the deceased for their meeting with God. They then dress the body in all white, handmade clothing, left slightly unfinished because it belongs not in this world but the “other world.” In Christianity, the white clothing worn by the corpse represents the pure life the deceased promised to live when they were baptized.

The body must wear a belt during its burial because the deceased will need it when they are resurrected during the Last Judgment. Belts are significant in both Christian and folk rituals. Babies receive them, along with a cross, at their christening. It symbolizes a person's commitment to Christianity. In folk tradition, belts mark out an individual's private space and prove that they are a member of society, as well as protecting the wearer from dark forces.

After washing and dressing the body, the body is laid out in the house for three days before it is put it in the coffin. Orthodox households and Old Belief (pre-1650 Orthodoxy) households perform this ritual slightly differently. Orthodox families lay their dead loved one so their head points towards the icon corner. In the houses of Old Believers the feet are placed closer to the icon corner so the deceased faces the corner and can pray if they desire. Old Believers believe that the dead can still feel for a time after their death. For fear of waking the newly dead, mourning does not begin during the washing or dressing. Inappropriate funeral etiquette can also wake the dead.

The coffin, sometimes referred to as the “new living room,” is very comfortable, made like a bed with a pillow stuffed with birch bark or wood shavings. Mourners place objects in the coffin that the body might need after death such as money, food, favorite belongings, and reflections of status or occupation. Traditionally, men carry the coffin on their backs to the cemetery where the burial will take place.

At the funeral, a priest performs the “seeing off” ceremony, praying over the body and allowing mourners to throw dirt on the grave, symbolically incorporating the corpse into the earth. The priest then places a paper crown on the head of the deceased and the mourners throw soil and coins into the grave (the coins are either to pay for transit to the “other world” or for the space in the cemetery). After the funeral, mourners sing laments depicting the deceased leaving their family and the soul departing from the body.

It is also important to throw away any handkerchiefs used to wipe away tears at the funeral. You should under no circumstances bring it home, as it is believed that if you do this you are bringing tears into the house.

== The soul ==
Russian folk culture depicts the soul either as small and childlike, or having wings and flying. For forty days after a funeral, the soul of the deceased visits places it liked or places where it sinned to ask for forgiveness. After forty days the deceased's family sets a place for their loved one at dinner, inviting them to join them for their own commemoration. When the family sees that the skin goes untouched they know their loved one has gone.

== See also ==
- List of Russian-language euphemisms for dying
