= Organ donation after medical assistance in dying =

Organ donation after medical assistance in dying (MAiD) refers to the process of donating organs after death, facilitated through medically assisted procedures. Both MAiD and organ donation are grounded in the principle of human autonomy, allowing individuals to make end-of-life decisions that reflect their personal values and desires. In countries where MAiD is legally permitted, governments have implemented strict regulations to govern both medical assistance in dying and organ donation procedures. The process of combining these two procedures—organ donation and MAiD—requires integrating the separate legal and ethical guidelines that apply to each.

As the demand for this practice grows, the combined procedure has evolved and is commonly referred to as "organ and tissue donation and transplantation after medical assistance in dying (OTDT after MAiD)" in English-speaking countries. In Europe, this practice is often referred to as "organ donation after euthanasia (ODE)."

By 2020, MAiD through lethal intravenous injection had been legalized in eight countries, and over 17,000 procedures had been conducted. Among these, more than 220 ODE procedures were carried out, highlighting the increasing integration of organ donation with medically assisted dying. In 2024, the worldwide incidence of MAiD procedures has risen to approximately 30,000.

== Medical Assistance in Dying (MAiD) and Organ Donation: Legal, Ethical, and Medical Considerations ==
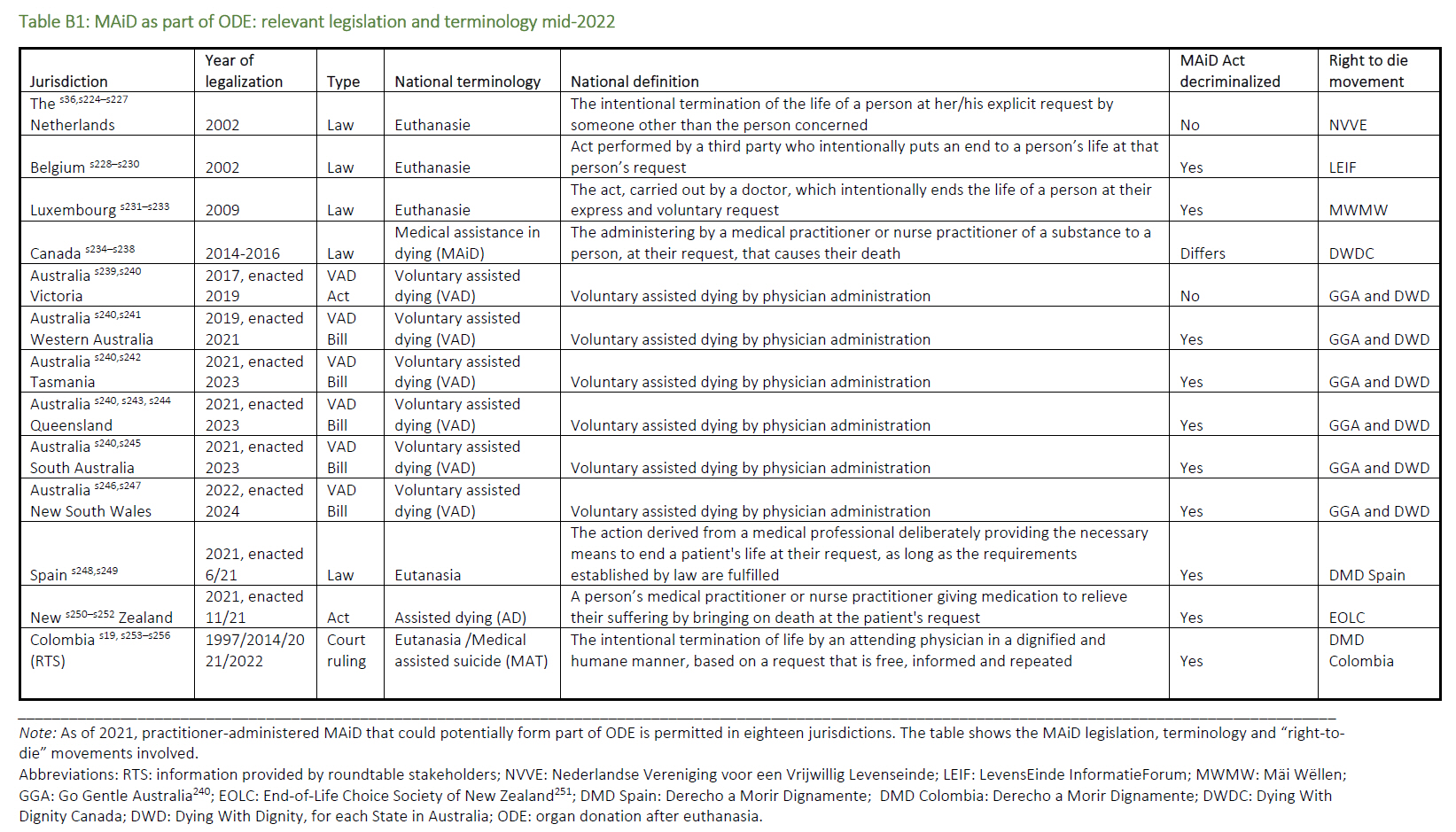
MAiD as part of ODE: relevant legislation and terminology mid-2022

MAiD is the act, legally undertaken by a third party, with the explicit intention of ending the patient’s life by medication, at the patient’s explicit, voluntary and competent. The act of MAiD has been decriminalized in an increasing number of countries but controversies still exist. These countries include the Netherlands, Belgium, Luxembourg, Canada, Spain, Australia, Colombia, and New Zealand. The name given to the act of MAiD varies by country: in the Netherlands, Belgium, Spain, and Luxembourg, the act is referred to as euthanasia; another European term is physician-assisted dying (PAD); and medical assistance in dying (MAiD) is the common term in Canada. The terms PAD and MAiD cover assisted suicide as well as euthanasia.

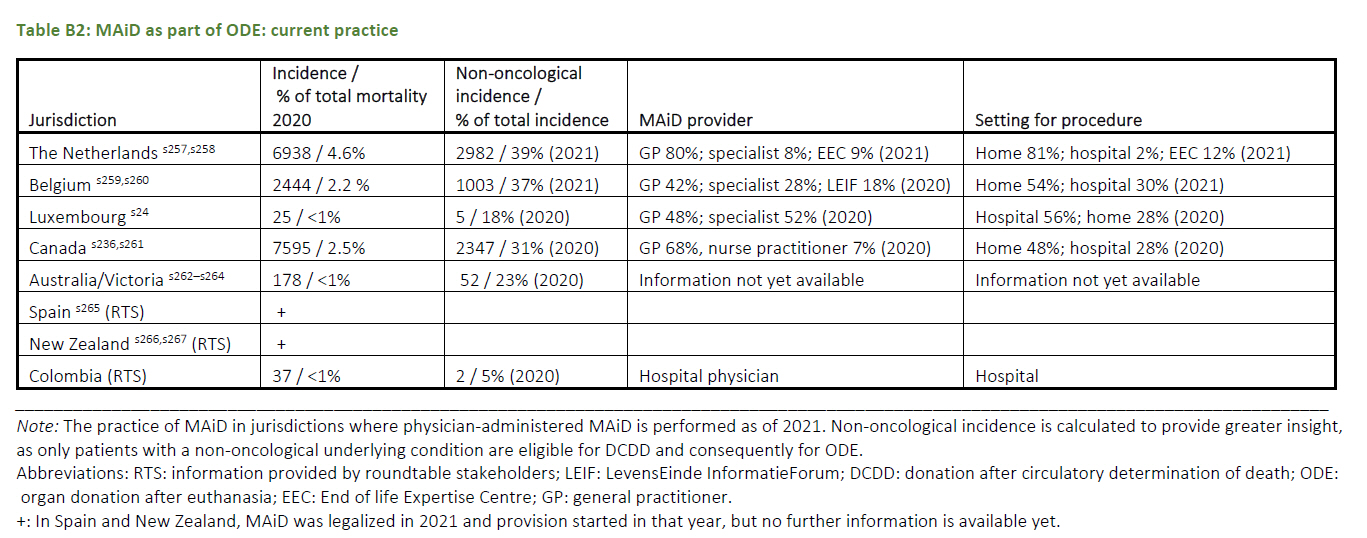
MAiD as part of ODE: current practice

Organ donation takes place all over the world and is encouraged by the WHO. Organs regularly transplanted include lungs, heart, cornea, pancreas, and kidneys. Modes of donation are an altruistic living donation of a non-vital organ (generally a kidney) and post-mortal organ donation (PMOD). PMOD can be subdivided into donation after brain death (DBD) and donation after circulatory determination of death (DCDD). Despite the development of organ donation programs, large numbers of patients still die on organ waiting lists. A special form of DCDD is OTDT after MAiD or ODE. In this case, circulatory death is induced by an act of the physician, whereas in other cases of DCDD it is most often caused by the withdrawal of life-sustaining treatment (WLST) after the establishment of an unfavourable prognosis in an intensive care unit.

== History ==
Cases widely publicized in the media have included those of Shelly Sarwal and Brian Wadsworth in Canada. Prominent cases in the Netherlands include those of Peter Veen, Dicky Ringeling and Arnold Mulder, in which the Dutch Minister of Health intervened to allow the procedure. The world's first ODE patient was Diane, in Belgium, whose GP, Patrick Wyffels, went to great lengths to arrange this procedure; a report of this case was published by the surgeon Olivier Detry in 2008. Patients requesting euthanasia tend to see organ donation after their death as a logical step that they wish to pursue. The first ODE case in the Netherlands took place in 2013, followed by Canada in 2016 and Spain in 2021. The number of times ODE has been performed now runs into the hundreds, with positive results on outcomes both in terms of family/patient experience and in terms of organ quality. A new development is ‘organ donation after euthanasia starting at home” (ODEH). ODEH was introduced by Johannes Mulder and Hans Sonneveld (2015) in the Netherlands, followed by introduction in Canada in 2019 and Spain in 2021. With ODEH, the sedation part of the MAiD procedure is initiated at the patient's home after final farewells with the family, so the patient does not experience anything further. The patient is then transported to a hospital for several hours, during which time death and organ donation take place, with their body then being returned home for the family to continue the bereavement process. Not only is the procedure reported to be more patient-centered and less burdensome, but it is said to improve the experience for the patient and their family. Hospital staff have also received this procedure favorably, due to its similarity to a standard DCD-III procedure. The world's first international conference on ODE (and ODEH) was held in 2021, during which it was confirmed that ODE had taken place 286 times while ODEH has now taken place on 5 occasions. March 2023 the first ODE was performed in Australia setting the number of performing countries at 5.

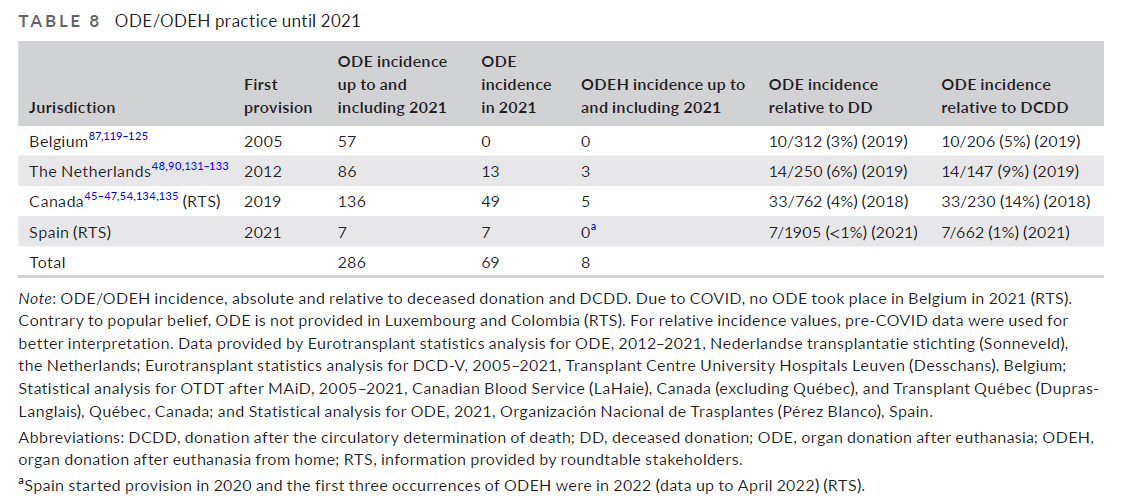
ODE/ODEH practice until 2021

== Professional guidelines ==
For complex medical procedures, guidelines need to be developed for professionals to adhere to and to ensure the trust of the public. In the case of ODE, separate procedures and guidelines have been established for MAiD and Organ Donation. For the combined ODE procedure, the most complex aspect is formulating ethically sound recommendations that are supported by all stakeholders involved. Careful examination of the procedure in terms of due care, patient autonomy, and protection of the vulnerable sick patient is essential. The practical implementation and protocols that were spontaneously developed by individual hospitals resulted in a number of issues being raised by professional associations on ethical, legal, and societal aspects, which needed to be addressed to gain and retain the confidence of the various stakeholders. In Canada policy guidance on OTDT after MAID is in place since 2019. In the Netherlands, the first nationally accepted, multidisciplinary ODE guideline, developed with the involvement of both MAiD and Organ Donation stakeholders, was published and presented to the Dutch Minister of Health and subsequently presented to the Dutch House of Representatives by Dutch Minister of Health Bruno Bruins in 2020. In Belgium, a general consensus was recently accepted. June 2022 a national guideline in Spain was published. A comprehensive review was published in 2022, including the results of the first international Roundtable of stakeholders on ODE/ODEH with the aim of providing insight into international ODE practice, so as to advise patients, professionals, and policymakers in the context of their jurisdiction, aiding the development of responsible national guidelines. The results are also published in Spanish, French and Dutch

== Public perception and media coverage ==
For the general public and the media, ODE is a confusing topic, with debates involving much use of framing and counterframing and little nuance. A Google search for organ donation after MAiD produces as its first hit a publication by Wilkinson containing a controversial plea for MAiD by removing the organs and not separating the MAiD procedure from the organ donation process. This approach is considered illegal around the world, but has attracted a lot of attention. In countries such as the US, Australia, and the UK the debate has tended to be fairly black and white, with those participating adopting extreme positions. However, the recent debate in New Zealand, as in the Netherlands, allows for greater nuance and a wider range of positions. Individual patients who have requested the procedure are generally positive and some of them have expressed this publicly in the media. Canadian Brian Wadsworth explained in an interview that, when he requested MAiD, he considered that asking for the chance to donate his organs too was the natural next choice. Shelly Sarwal, also from Canada, featured in a documentary on the process leading up to ODE. Peter Veen, an ALS patient, was the first to proceed with the ODEH procedure and his experience was also recorded in a documentary film in 2017 followed in 2022 by a similar documentary involving patient Jos. The comprehensive review from 2022 on ODE/ODEH was covered by lay media from the involved countries.

== Ethics ==
=== Desirability ===
For euthanasia and organ donation, the patient's autonomous choice is regarded as crucial to its justification. This active exercise of autonomy when it comes to choices in the final phase of life is common among patients with a wish for MAiD. The desirability of the ODE/ODEH procedure originates from autonomous requests being made by MAiD patients themselves. Donating after MAiD has been reported as giving them a sense of purpose and determination A secondary benefit is the increased availability of donor organs.

=== Nonmaleficence ===
ODE/ODEH involves two distinct stakeholder parties. the patient (donor) care community and the transplant (recipient) care community. The patient care community (GPs, MAiD providers, family) aims for an optimal end-of-life experience for the sick and suffering patient with the least possible discomfort. The transplant care community aims at helping the recipient with failing organs. These different perspectives require strict measures to safeguard sick patients’ interests and protect them from harm. Both Dutch and Canadian legislation stresses the importance of an autonomous, voluntary decision to undergo ODE/ODEH and the separation of the request for MAiD, which should precede the organ donation request according to Eurotransplant's policy rule on ODE/ODEH. Reflecting the added importance of avoiding any perceived pressure, the Dutch guideline contains a further recommendation for a "patient-initiated request” approach regarding ODE/ODEH.

Ensuring nonmaleficence to patients includes generally accepted ethical rules of organ donation programs like the “dead donor rule”. The patient must be deceased before organ procurement is started. In the case of ODE/ODEH, this means that the heart must have stopped beating for 5 minutes.

Furthermore, nonmaleficence due care for the treating physician includes protecting the patient from the additional burden, which is particularly important due to the vulnerable state of most patients who request MAiD. ODEH is a further step in this direction. A final issue is that healthcare workers may have conscientious objections. Most regulatory bodies in the countries where MAiD is performed have policies that cover this subject.

Potential vulnerabilities and opportunities related to the limits of reliably assessing consciousness in critically ill, behaviorally unresponsive patients undergoing controlled organ donation after circulatory determination of death have been identified, and neurologically informed safeguards have been advanced, recognizing potential for self-fulfilling prophecy and premature withdrawal of life-sustaining treatment.
