= Suicide tourism =

Practice of people travelling to a specific jurisdiction to die by suicide

Suicide tourism, or euthanasia tourism, is the practice of potential suicide candidates travelling to a jurisdiction to die by suicide or assisted suicide which is legal in some jurisdictions, or the practice of travelling to a jurisdiction in order to obtain drugs that can aid in the process of ending one's own life.

== Status in various countries ==
=== Cambodia ===
An American expatriate who set up websites offering to help people make arrangements to kill themselves in Cambodia shut the sites down in 2005, saying he hoped to avoid problems with the authorities.

=== Mexico ===
A drug known as liquid pentobarbital, which is used by owners to euthanize pets, can give a person a painless death in under one hour. Due to the drug's availability at pet shops, tourists seeking to end their lives were reported to be flying from around the world to Mexico.

=== Netherlands ===
Critics have claimed that the Dutch initiative for euthanasia will trigger a wave of "euthanasia tourism". However, a clause insisting on a well-established relationship between doctor and patient is designed to prevent this.

=== Switzerland ===
Regulations were proposed to limit possibilities of legal suicide assistance for foreigners in Switzerland. The law primarily targeted Dignitas, the sole organization offering assisted suicide to non-resident foreign nationals. The Swiss government rejected proposed stricter regulations in 2006, maintaining the status quo as regulated by Paragraph 115 of Swiss Criminal Code.

As of 2008, 60% of all suicides assisted by the organisation Dignitas had been Germans, and between 1998 and 2018 around 1,250 German citizens (almost three times the number of any other nationality) travelled to Dignitas in Zürich, for an assisted suicide. During the same period over 400 British citizens also opted to end their life at the same clinic. The names of a few of these people are known, though most remain anonymous. By November 2008, the number of British members of Dignitas had risen to 725, a number exceeded only by Swiss and German membership. Given the size and population density of Europe, it is certain that there are Dignitas members in other European countries. Conservative politicians in Switzerland have repeatedly criticized suicide assistance for foreigners, branding it suicide tourism (Sterbetourismus in German).

In January 2006, British doctor Anne Turner died by suicide in a Zürich clinic having developed an incurable degenerative disease. Her story was reported by the BBC at the time with a film crew travelling to Zürich. In 2009, her story was made into a TV film, A Short Stay in Switzerland, starring Julie Walters.

In 2007, Dignitas launched an effort to gain legal permission for healthy foreigners, including married couples with suicide pacts, to end their lives in Switzerland.

In July 2009, British conductor Sir Edward Downes and his wife Joan died together at a suicide clinic outside Zürich "under circumstances of their own choosing." Sir Edward was not terminally ill, but his wife was diagnosed with rapidly developing cancer.

On March 2, 2010, PBS Frontline TV program in the United States showed a documentary called The Suicide Tourist which told the story of Professor Craig Ewert, his family, and Dignitas, and his decision to die by assisted suicide in Switzerland after he was diagnosed and suffering with ALS (Lou Gehrig's Disease).

In a referendum on 15 May 2011, voters in the Canton of Zürich overwhelmingly rejected calls to ban assisted suicide or to outlaw the practice for non-residents. Out of more than 278,000 ballots cast, the initiative to ban assisted suicide was rejected by 85% of voters and the initiative to outlaw it for foreigners was turned down by 78%.

=== United States ===
Euthanasia is illegal in all 50 states but select jurisdictions have legalized physician-assisted suicide. In 1997, the Oregon Death with Dignity Act went into effect. In 2008, Washington state passed their law which was then implemented in 2009. Laws may only be implemented by licensed physicians based on the individual needs of qualified patients. Patients must meet state requirements to be eligible for physician-assisted suicide.

== See also ==
- List of suicide sites
- Medical tourism
- Euthanasia device
