= Pegasos Swiss Association =

Swiss assisted suicide organization

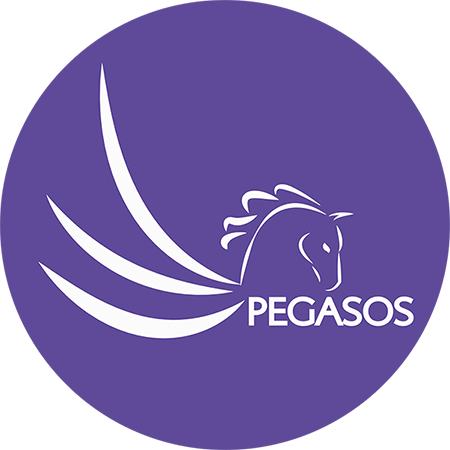
- Founded: 15 August 2019; 5 years ago in Basel, Switzerland
- Founder: Ruedi Habegger
- Area served: World
- Website: pegasos-association.com

Pegasos Swiss Association or Pegasos is a non-profit group based in Basel, Switzerland with a minimal-bureaucracy approach to assisted suicide. They also used to have an office in Melbourne, Australia, which is now closed. In Greek mythology, Pegasus is a winged horse that the Pegasos association sees as symbolizing how patients speedily escape gravity on their final journey.

== Origin ==
Pegasos Swiss Association was founded in August 2019 by Ruedi Habegger, brother of the Swiss suicide activist Erika Preisig. Habegger was instrumental in the assisted suicide of famous 104-year old Australian scientist David Goodall. In its first month, the association provided four patients with lethal doses of sodium pentobarbital at their Liestal facility.

== Process ==
While other assisted suicide organisations require reports from medical experts, Pegasos needs them only in medically complex cases, such as patients with mental and neurological diseases.

== Controversies ==
In June 2020, Krista Atkins, died at the Pegasos clinic, aged 40. She had been suffering from severe mental illnesses and had been in contact with Exit International, seeking guidance on ending her own life, since 2017. The day before she died, her brother warned the clinic not to assist her to die and her family threatened to sue the clinic after her death; however, she issued a final statement shortly before her death reaffirming her intent to die and rejecting her brother's claims.

In May 2024, Pegasos encountered significant controversy when it was discovered they'd helped UK citizen Alistair Hamilton, 47, who had stated he was suffering from an undiagnosed health condition, to die. Hamilton had told his family that he was going on a short break to Paris, but instead went to Pegasos for an assisted suicide. His family complained about the lack of communication and transparency from the clinic.

== See also ==
- Assisted suicide
- Dignitas (Swiss non-profit organisation)
- Exit International
