= Dignitas (non-profit organisation) =

Swiss organisation offering assisted suicide to members

- Formation: 1998
- Founder: Ludwig Minelli
- Location: Forch, Switzerland
- Website: www.dignitas.ch

Dignitas is a Swiss nonprofit organisation providing physician-assisted suicide, supported by independent Swiss doctors. By the end of 2020, they had assisted 3,248 people in dying by suicide in Switzerland. They provide advisory work on palliative care, health care advance directives, suicide attempt prevention, and legislation for right-to-die laws around the world.

Members who wish to end their life must be able to prove they are of sound mind, as determined by the organisation; be themselves able to bring about death; and submit a formal request including a letter explaining their wish to die and medical reports showing diagnosis and attempted treatment. For people with severe psychiatric illness, an in-depth medical report prepared by a psychiatrist is additionally required per a Swiss Supreme Court decision.

== History ==
Dignitas was founded in 1998, by Swiss lawyer Ludwig Minelli (1932–2025), who specialised in human rights law. Swiss laws provide that assistance to suicide is legal as long as it is not driven by selfish motives.

=== Referendums ===
In two referendums on 15 May 2011, voters in the Canton of Zurich overwhelmingly rejected calls to ban assisted suicide or to outlaw the practice for non-residents. Out of more than 278,000 ballots cast, the initiative to ban assisted suicide was rejected by 85 percent of voters and the initiative to outlaw it for non-residents was turned down by 78 percent.

=== Reaction of local Swiss people and authorities ===
Dignitas has faced difficulties over the years. In September 2007, Dignitas was evicted, blocked or locked out of three flats, and so Minelli offered assisted suicide in his private house. This, however, was then prohibited by the local council. In October 2007, Dignitas was again prevented from working in a private house by the local council and refused rooms on an industrial site. In December 2007, an interim judgment prevented Dignitas from working in a building next to a busy brothel. The media frenzy led to several people offering Dignitas flats or houses, of which one turned out to be suitable. Since 2009, Dignitas has a house at an undisclosed location where accompanied suicide for people from abroad has taken place.

== Operation ==
=== Patient criteria ===
In the Dignitas programme, criteria include that the person:

- state they are willing to die due to personal or mental/physical health issues
- be of sound judgement
- be able themselves to action the last stage – to swallow, administer the gastric tube or open the valve of the intravenous access tube.

In certain right-to-die organisations, an age restriction is in place for potential patients, so as to prevent young people from using their services.

=== Preparation ===
The person who wishes to die attends two private consultations (separated by time) with several Dignitas personnel in addition to an independent medical doctor who assesses the evidence provided by the patient in advance. Legally admissible proof that the person wishes to die is also created in the form of a signed affidavit countersigned by independent witnesses. If a patient is physically unable to sign a document, a short video of the patient is made in which they are asked to confirm their identity, that they wish to die, and that their decision is made of their own free will, without persuasion or coercion. This evidence of informed consent remains private and is preserved only for use in any possible legal dispute.

Finally, a few minutes before the lethal overdose is provided, the person is once again reminded that taking the overdose will end their life. Additionally, they are asked several times whether they want to proceed, or take some time to consider the matter further. This gives the person the opportunity to stop the process at any time. However, if at this point the person states that they are determined to proceed, a lethal overdose is provided and ingested.

=== Method ===
In general, Dignitas uses the following protocol to assist death: an oral dose of an antiemetic drug, followed approximately half an hour later by a lethal overdose of 15 grams of powdered pentobarbital dissolved in a glass of water. Alternatively this may be ingested by gastric tube or intravenously.

The pentobarbital overdose depresses the central nervous system, causing the patient to become drowsy and fall asleep within 3–5 minutes of drinking it; anaesthesia progresses to coma, followed by respiratory arrest and death, which occurs within 30–40 minutes of ingesting the pentobarbital.

Exceptionally, in four cases in 2008, Dignitas used helium gas as a suicide method instead of pentobarbital. The medical supervision was still observed, however, and the method avoided controlled drugs, which reduced the risk of medical authorities disciplining the medical doctor who authorised the assisted suicide.

=== Statistics ===
250 accompanied suicides took place under the Dignitas programme in 2023.

Ludwig Minelli said in an interview in March 2008 that Dignitas had assisted 840 people to die, 60% of them Germans. By 2010, that number had exceeded a thousand assisted suicides. As of August 2015, approximately 300 British citizens had travelled to Switzerland to die at one of Dignitas' rented apartments in Zurich. Travelling to undertake assisted suicide has been termed suicide tourism.

Most people contacting Dignitas do not plan to die but wish for assurance in case their illness becomes intolerable. Of those who receive the so-called "provisional green light", 70% never return to Dignitas.

As of 2008, 21% of people receiving assisted suicide in Dignitas did not have a terminal or progressive illness, but rather "weariness of life".

=== Costs and finances ===
According to the official Dignitas website, as of 2026, Dignitas charged its patients 7,500 Swiss Francs for the preparation and suicide assistance. There are additional costs if Dignitas is to take care of administration duties and if a funeral and/or a cremation is to take place in Switzerland. Dignitas has been known to waive certain costs where there is hardship. Under Swiss law, Dignitas operates as a non-profit organisation, but does not open its finances to the public.

=== Cremation urns found in Lake Zurich ===
In a 2010 interview with The Atlantic magazine, Minelli admitted to depositing cremation urns containing the ashes of Dignitas members at Lake Zurich. In Switzerland, it is not against the law to scatter cremation ashes into nature.

== Dignitas in media ==
A November 2000 article in the German newspaper Der Spiegel on one of the clinic's patients brought public attention to the clinic, which had been little known at that point.

In 2008, the documentary film Right to Die? was broadcast on Sky Real Lives (rebroadcast on PBS Frontline in March 2010 as The Suicide Tourist). It includes the story of Craig Ewert, a 59-year-old retired university professor who suffered from a motor neurone disease. Ewert traveled to Switzerland, where he was assisted by the Dignitas NGO. The documentary shows him dying with Mary, his wife of 37 years, at his side. It was shown on the Swiss television network SF 1.

The BBC produced a film titled A Short Stay in Switzerland, telling the story of Dr Anne Turner, who made the journey to the Dignitas assisted suicide facility. On 24 January 2006, the day before her 67th birthday, she ended her life. The film was shown on BBC1 on 25 January 2009.

Maestro Sir Edward Downes, conductor of the BBC Philharmonic and the Royal Opera, who struggled as his hearing and sight failed (but was not terminally ill), died with his wife, who had terminal cancer, at an assisted suicide facility in Switzerland in July 2009. He was 85 and she was 74.

Theorist and translator Michèle Causse chose to die on her birthday, 29 July 2010, in association with Dignitas.

On 13 June 2011, BBC Two aired a documentary titled Terry Pratchett: Choosing to Die, featuring author and Alzheimer's disease sufferer Sir Terry Pratchett guiding viewers through an assisted suicide which took place at Dignitas facilities in Switzerland. Peter Smedley, a British hotelier and millionaire, and his wife Christine allowed for Pratchett to film Smedley's deliberate consumption of prepared barbiturate in a glass in order to kill himself as Christine comforted Smedley in his demise. The documentary received a highly polarised reaction in the United Kingdom, with much praise for the programme as "brave", "sensitive" and "important" whilst it also gathered accusations of "pro-death" bias from anti-euthanasia pressure groups and of encouraging the view that disability was a good reason for killing from disability groups.

Dignitas continued to be presented in the media as a political stance on the right to die. BBC featured an article regarding the death of UK citizen Jeffrey Spector, a businessman who decided to travel to Switzerland to undergo assisted suicide through Dignitas for an inoperable tumour which most likely would have caused paralysis later on in its development. This situation reignited the debate around the morality of assisted suicides in certain dilemmas, and incited current stances concerning euthanasia. Former Lord Chancellor Lord Falconer said he would "attempt to reintroduce a bill that would allow assisted dying in the UK".

The book Me Before You and the film adaptation of the same name discuss the organisation as it serves a vital function in both the main plot and the characters' lives. Their motto "Menschenwürdig leben – Menschenwürdig sterben" is "To live with dignity – to die with dignity" in English.

In the 2026 series finale of the HBO Max original show Hacks, after learning that her tumors have spread, Deborah Vance considers traveling to Switzerland to end her life at Dignitas. She ultimately changes her mind and decides to pursue treatment, driven by her love of comedy and the craft.

== See also ==
- Assisted suicide
- Pegasos Swiss Association – An assisted death organisation
