= A Short Stay in Switzerland =

- Directed by: Simon Curtis
- Music by: John Harle
- Country of origin: United Kingdom
- Original language: English

Production
- Running time: 90 minutes

Original release
- Release: 25 January 2009

A Short Stay in Switzerland is a 2009 British television film directed by Simon Curtis and written by Frank McGuinness. It stars Julie Walters, who won the International Emmy Award for Best Actress for her performance as Dr Anne Turner. It was produced by the BBC and was later released on DVD in regions 1 and 2.

It was also nominated for other numerous awards including the BAFTA TV Award for Best Single Drama and Best Actress.

== Plot ==
Having recently witnessed the death of her husband from a neurological disease, Dr Anne Turner is diagnosed with near-identical illness progressive supranuclear palsy and determines to end her life once her condition has reached a critical point. As her health deteriorates, Anne's son, Edward, and two daughters, Sophie and Jessica, struggle to reach a consensus over their mother's intentions to end her life in an assisted dying facility (Dignitas) in Switzerland (where this is legal) and while they search for alternative options, silent recriminations and stubborn practicality threaten to tear the family apart. With her family at loggerheads, Anne must also face the fury of her best friend, whose opposing views bring them into direct conflict.

== Cast ==
- Julie Walters as Dr Anne Turner
- Stephen Campbell Moore as Edward
- Lyndsey Marshal as Jessica
- Liz White as Sophie
- Michelle Fairley as Mrs Savery
- Will Knightley as Dr Jack Turner
- Patrick Malahide as Richard
- Harriet Walter as Clare
- Bruce Alexander as Doctor

== Background ==
The film was inspired by the true story of Dr Anne Turner (25 January 1939 - 24 January 2006), who opted for an assisted suicide in Zurich, having developed the incurable neurodegenerative disease progressive supranuclear palsy (PSP). Before being diagnosed with PSP, Dr Turner had nursed her husband until he died from a similar disease, multiple system atrophy (MSA). Dr Turner had also had breast cancer. Her brother had also suffered from a progressive condition, motor neurone disease.
